= Fully powered cartridge =

Rifle cartridge

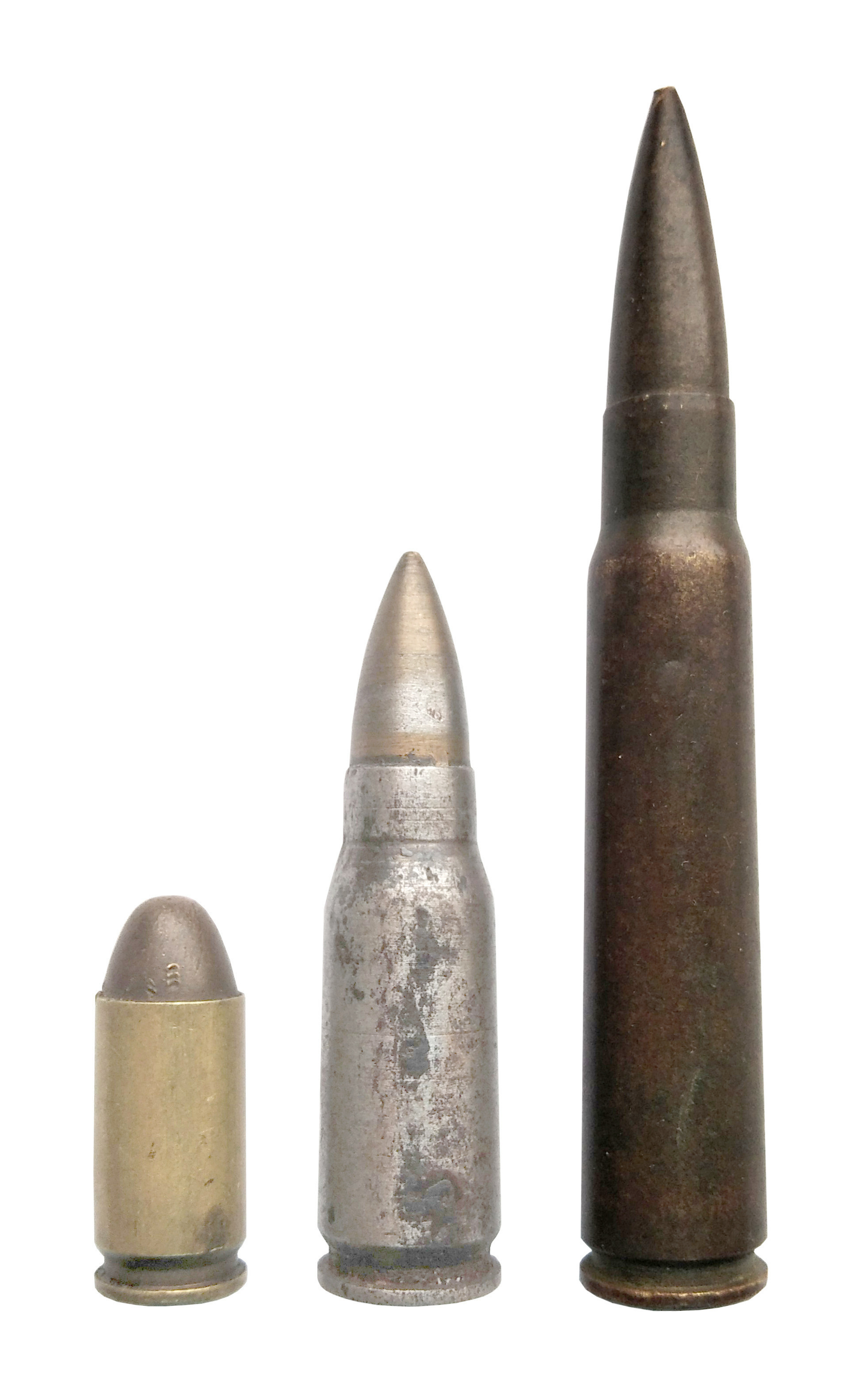
From left to right: 9×19mm Parabellum (pistol cartridge) 7.92×33mm Kurz (intermediate-power rifle cartridge) 7.92×57mm Mauser (full-power rifle cartridge)

A fully powered cartridge, also called full-power cartridge or full-size cartridge, is an umbrella term describing any rifle cartridge that emphasizes ballistics performance and single-shot accuracy, with little or no concern to its weight or recoil. The term generally refers to traditional cartridges used in machine guns, bolt action and semi-automatic service rifles and select fire battle rifles prior to, during and immediately after the World Wars and into the early Cold War era, and was a retronym originally made to differentiate from intermediate-power rifle cartridges that gained widespread adoption into military service after World War II.

Full-power cartridges often have a caliber comparable to or greater than 7.5 mm (0.30 in) and a maximum effective range of at least 800 m (870 yd), and are intended for engaging targets beyond 300 m (330 yd). However, cartridges with calibers as narrow as 6.5 mm (0.26 in) have been described as being a full-power rifle cartridge. According the cartridge's overall length (COL), full-power cartridges can be grouped into long-action or "standard-action" cartridges, which are traditional cartridges (exemplified by the .30-06 Springfield, 8mm Mauser and 7.62×54mmR) with a COL between 72 and 85 mm (2.8 and 3.3 in); and short-action cartridges (such as the .308 Winchester and 6.5mm Creedmoor), which have a COL between 57 and 72 mm (2.2 and 2.8 in) and largely replaced long-action cartridges as battle rifle service ammunitions since the Cold War. Cartridges with a COL above 85mm are often however considered magnum cartridges instead of "full-powered".

Most modern full-power rifle cartridges have their origin in the late 19th century and early 20th century with the advent of smokeless powder. Examples include the 6.5×55mm Swedish, 7×57mm Mauser, 7.5×55mm Swiss, 7.5×54mm French, 7.62×51mm NATO, 7.62×54mmR, .30-06 Springfield, .303 British, 7.65×53mm Mauser, 7.7×58mm Arisaka, 7.92×57mm Mauser, and 8×50mmR Lebel. The US military's Next Generation Squad Weapon Program selected the 6.8×51mm Common Cartridge in 2022 for testing in a new carbine, new light machine guns and possibly in converted general-purpose machine guns. This does not guarantee actual widespread future issue of the brass-steel hybrid cased 6.8×51mm Common Cartridge.

Despite the ubiquitous adoption of assault rifles and intermediate-power rifle cartridge cartridges as the standard weapon infantry weapon system, full-power rifle cartridges are still widely used today in battle rifles, designated marksman rifles (DMRs), sniper rifles, general purpose machine guns (GPMGs), and conventional hunting rifles.

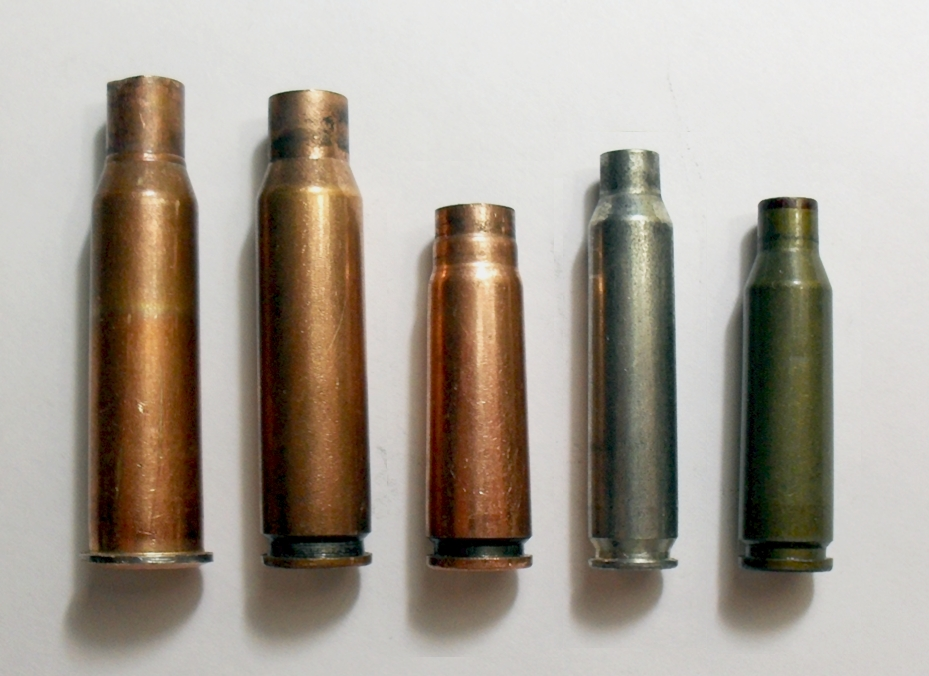
(Left to right) Full-power rifle cartridges: 7.62×54mmR 7.62×51mm NATO Intermediate-power rifle cartridges: 7.62×39mm 5.56×45mm NATO 5.45×39mm

== Long-action vs. short-action ==
In the first half of the 20th century, the practice of civilian sportsmen experimenting and modifying existing cartridges to suit different ballistic needs, known as "wildcatting", really took off, and the result was the number of newly available cartridges exploded from a couple of dozen to well over one hundred. Having dozens of different cartridges all with unique dimensions was a headache for rifle manufacturers, and still wanting to reach the widest consumer market possible, they had to find a way to economically produce rifles that could be adapted to accept every chambering on the market. While barrels could be custom-made affordably, actions required more time, complex machining, and were thus expensive to make, so it made sense to produce the rifle action's dimensions so that a few standardized lengths could reliably use most (if not all) of the cartridges on the market.

The so-called "standard length" cartridges are traditional rifle cartridges with a cartridge overall length (COL) between 2.81 to 3.34 in (71.4 to 84.8 mm), which is best exemplified by the .30-06 Springfield. Most of today's long-action cartridges had their cases designed around .30-06 Springfield's case dimensions, such as the .270 Winchester, .280 Remington, .35 Whelen, .264 Winchester Magnum, and 7mm Remington Magnum, as well as much newer cartridges like the .26 Nosler and .28 Nosler.

The .308 Winchester debuted in 1952 and its militarized version, the 7.62×51mm NATO, was adopted by the U.S. military in 1954 for the new M14 rifle. By the 1960s, it had displaced the .30-06 Springfield as the popular cartridge in both the hunting fields and in the battlefields. With a much shorter COL of 2.8 in (71 mm) and using the improved propellants available in the 1950s, it could do nearly everything traditional military rifle cartridges did, such as the .30-06 Springfield, but was cheaper to make, lighter in weight, more compact in size, and had lower recoil energy. More importantly, while the .30-06 has produced roughly a dozen wildcat cartridges, only the .270 Winchester and the .25-06 Remington enjoyed widespread commercial support; in contrast, the .308 Winchester served as the parent case for the wildcat .243 Winchester, .260 Remington, 7mm-08 Remington, .338 Federal, and .358 Winchester, all five of which are used by hunters to this day. The result was a new series of short-action cartridges, typically with a COL between 2.3 to 2.8 in (58.4 to 71.1 mm), that tend to use bullets of different calibers, rather than using a wide variety of the same caliber to achieve the same ballistic effect.

The success of short-action cartridges led to the original and longer "standard length" cartridges to be retronymously named long-action cartridges. The intermediate cartridges, which later gained ubiquity over the short-action cartridges as the mainstream service ammunition for both military assault rifles and civilian modern sporting rifles, have a COL averaging around 2.36 in (59.9 mm), much less than 2.8 in (71 mm), and are thus also sometimes referred to as the super short-action or "mini-action" cartridges.

== Characteristics ==
Typical full-power cartridges have:

- Bottlenecked, rimmed or semi-rimmed in older cartridges, rimless in newer cartridges
- According to the official C.I.P. (Commission Internationale Permanente pour l'Epreuve des Armes à Feu Portatives) and NATO EPVAT rulings the maximum service pressures range between 345.00–440.00 MPa (50,038–63,817 psi) P_{max} piezo pressure
- Muzzle energies ranging between 2,500–4,500 J (1,844–3,319 ft⋅lbf)
- Muzzle velocities ranging between 700–950 m/s (2,297–3,117 ft/s)
- High O_{ratios} ranging from 7.00 to 12.00

== List of full power cartridges ==
=== Service cartridges ===
Service cartridges are cartridges the service rifles and the standard machine guns of armies were or are chambered for.

- 7.62×51mm NATO (NATO)
- 7.92×57mm Mauser (Germany)
- 7.62×54mmR (Russia)
- .303 British (United Kingdom)
- 7.5×54mm French (France)
- 8×50mmR Lebel (France)
- 7x57mm Mauser (Spain)
- 7.65×53mm Mauser (Turkey) and (Belgium)
- .30-40 Krag (United States)
- 6mm Lee Navy (United States)
- .30-06 Springfield (United States)
- 7.5×55mm Swiss (Switzerland)
- 6.5×50mmSR Arisaka (Japan)
- 7.7×58mm Arisaka (Japan)
- 8×50mmR Mannlicher (Austria) and (Hungary)
- 8×56mmR (Austria) and (Hungary)
- 11×50mm R Comblain (Belgium)
- 11.35x52mmR Dutch Beaumont (Netherlands)
- 6.5×52mm Carcano (Italy)
- 7.35×51mm Carcano (Italy)
- 8x58mmRb Breda (Italy)
- 6.5×55mm Swedish (Sweden) and (Norway)
- 8x63 patron m/32 (Sweden)
- 8×58mmR Danish Krag (Denmark)
- 6.5×54mm Mannlicher–Schönauer (Greece)
- 6.5×53mmR (Netherlands)
- 6.5×58mm Vergueiro (Portugal)
- 6.8×51mm Common Cartridge (United States)

=== Commercial ===
Cartridges privately sold on the civilian market.

- .308 Winchester (civilian version of 7.62x51 NATO)
- 6.5 Creedmoor
- 6.5x47mm Lapua
- .22 Creedmoor (derived from 6.5 Creedmoor)
- 6mm Remington
- .243 Winchester
- .257 Roberts
- .260 Remington
- .270 Winchester
- .284 Winchester
- 7x64mm
- .300 Savage
- .338 Federal
- .348 Winchester
- .376 Steyr
- 9.3x57mm Mauser
- .45-70 (modern loads)
- .510 Whisper

== See also ==
- Cartridge (firearms)
  - List of handgun cartridges
  - List of rebated rim cartridges
  - List of rifle cartridges
- Intermediate cartridge
- Magnum cartridge
- Overpressure ammunition
