= List of rifle cartridges =

List of rifle cartridges, by primer type, calibre and name.

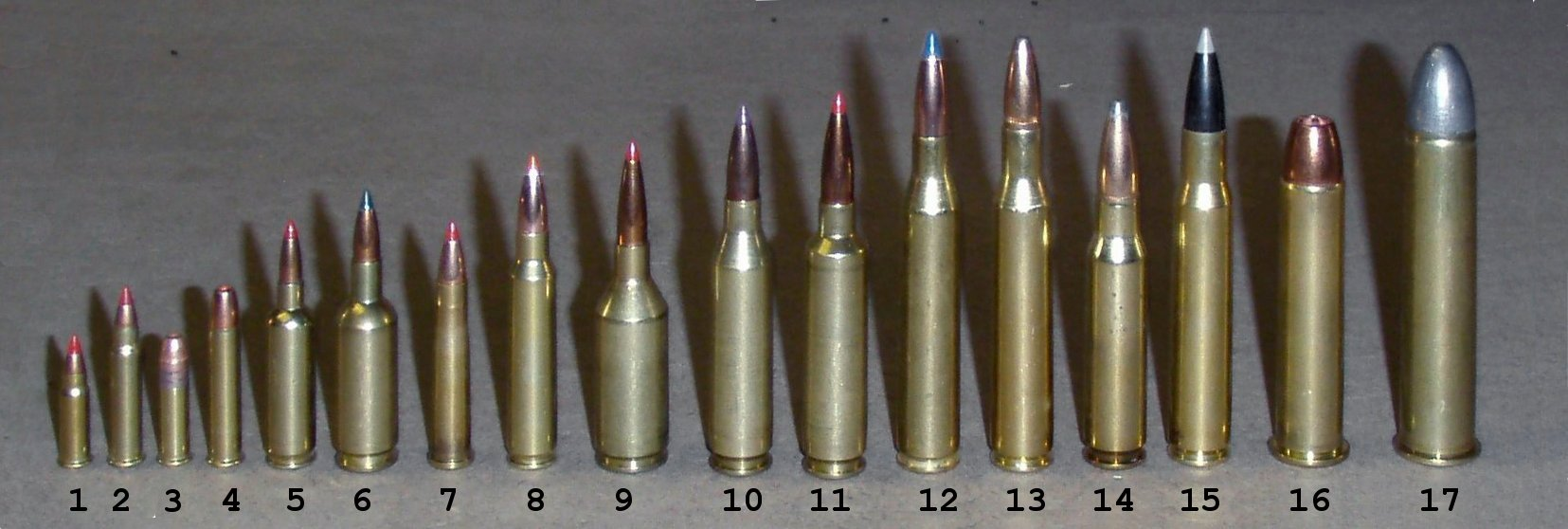
From left to right: 1 .17 Hornady Mach 2, 2 .17 Hornady Magnum Rimfire, 3 .22 Long Rifle, 4 .22 Winchester Magnum Rimfire, 5 .17/23 SMc, 6 5mm/35 SMc, 7 .22 Hornet, 8 .223 Remington, 9 .223 WSSM, 10 .243 Winchester, 11 .243 Winchester Improved (Ackley), 12 .25-06 Remington, 13 .270 Winchester, 14 .308 Winchester, 15 .30-06 Springfield, 16 .45-70 Government, 17 .50-90 Sharps

== Rimfire cartridges ==
=== Inches ===
- .17 Hornady Mach 2
- .17 Hornady Magnum Rimfire
- .17 Munisalva
- .17 PMC/Aguila
- .17 Winchester Super Magnum
- .22 BB Cap
- .22 CB Cap
- .22 Short
- .22 Long
- .22 Long Rifle
- .22 Extra Long
- .22 ILARCO
- .22 Winchester Rimfire
- .22 Winchester Magnum Rimfire
- .22 Remington Automatic
- .22 Winchester Automatic
- .25 Short
- .25 Stevens Short
- .25 Stevens
- .32 rimfire
- .38 rimfire
- .41 rimfire
- .41 Short Rimfire
- .41 Swiss
- .44 Henry
- .46 rimfire
- .50 Remington Navy
- .56-56 Spencer

=== Metric ===
- 4 mm Flobert Short
- 4 mm Flobert Long
- 4.5×26mm MKR
- 5 mm Remington Rimfire Magnum
- 9mm Flobert
- 10.4×38mmRF
- 12.17×42mmRF
- 14x33mmRF
- 17x28mmRF
- 17.5x29mmRF

== Centerfire cartridges ==
=== Inches ===
==== Smaller than .30 caliber ====
- .14-222
- .17-223
- .17 Ackley Bee
- .17 Hornet
- .17 Mach IV
- .17 Remington
- .17 Remington Fireball
- .19-223
- .19 Badger
- .19 Calhoon Hornet
- .20 BR
- .20 Tactical
- .20 VarTarg
- .204 Ruger
- .22 Accelerator
- .22 ARC
- .22 Creedmoor
- .22 Hornet
- .22 CHeetah
- .218 Bee
- .219 Donaldson Wasp
- .219 Zipper
- .303/22
- .22 Savage Hi-Power
- .22 BR Remington
- .22 Eargesplitten Loudenboomer
- .22 PPC
- .22 Remington Jet
- .22 Spitfire
- .22 WCF
- .220 Russian
- .220 Rook
- .220 Swift
- .221 Remington Fireball
- .22 Nosler
- .22-250 Remington
- .222 Remington
- .222 Remington Magnum
- .222 Rimmed
- .223 Remington
- .223 Winchester Super Short Magnum
- .224 Boz
- .224 Weatherby Magnum
- .224 Valkyrie
- .225 Winchester
- .297/230 Morris
- .240 Apex
- .240 Weatherby Magnum
- .242 Rimless Nitro Express
- .243 Winchester
- .243 Winchester Super Short Magnum
- .244 H&H Magnum
- .244 Remington
- .246 Purdey
- .303/25
- .25 Remington
- .25-45 Sharps
- .25-21 Stevens
- .25-25 Stevens
- .25 Winchester Super Short Magnum
- .250 Savage
- .25-06 Remington
- .25-20 Winchester
- .25-35 Winchester
- .25-45 Sharps
- .297/250 Rook
- .250-3000 Savage
- .255 Jeffery Rook
- .256 Gibbs Magnum
- .256 Newton
- .256 Winchester Magnum
- .257 Roberts
- .257 Weatherby Magnum
- .26 Nosler
- .260 Remington
- .264 LBC-AR
- .264 Winchester Magnum
- .270 Weatherby Magnum
- .270 Winchester
- .270 Winchester Short Magnum
- .275 H&H Magnum
- .275 No 2 Magnum
- .275 Rigby
- .276 Enfield
- .276 Pedersen
- .277 FURY
- .277 Wolverine
- .28 Nosler
- .280 Ackley Improved
- .280 British
- .280 Flanged
- .280 Jeffery
- .280 Remington
- .280 Ross
- .284 Winchester

==== .30 caliber – .39 caliber ====
- .30 Carbine
- .30 Newton
- .30 Nosler
- .30 R Blaser
- .30 Remington
- .30 Remington AR
- .30 TC
- .30-01
- .30-03 Springfield
- .30-06 JDJ
- .30-06 Springfield
- .30-30 Winchester
- .30-378 Weatherby Magnum
- .30-40 Krag
- .300 PRC
- .300-221
- .300 AAC Blackout
- .300 H&H Magnum
- .300 ICL Grizzly
- .300 Lapua Magnum
- .300 Norma Magnum
- .300 Remington Short Action Ultra Magnum
- .300 Remington Ultra Magnum
- .300 Rook
- .300 Ruger Compact Magnum
- .300 Savage
- .300 Sherwood
- .300 Weatherby Magnum
- .300 Whisper
- .300 Winchester Magnum
- .300 Winchester Short Magnum
- .303 British
- .303 Magnum
- .303 Savage
- .375/303 Westley Richards Accelerated Express
- .307 Winchester
- .308 Marlin Express
- .308 Norma Magnum
- .308 Winchester
- .308×1.5" Barnes
- .310 Cadet
- .318 Westley Richards
- .32 Winchester Self-Loading
- .32 Winchester Special
- .32-20 Winchester
- .32-40 Ballard
- .32-40 Winchester
- .325 Winchester Short Magnum
- .327 Federal Magnum
- .33 Nosler
- .33 Winchester
- .333 Jeffery
- .338 Edge
- .338 Federal
- .338 Lapua Magnum
- .338 Marlin express
- .338 Norma Magnum
- .338 Remington Ultra Magnum
- .338 Ruger Compact Magnum
- .338 Winchester Magnum
- .338-06
- .338-378 Weatherby Magnum
- .338 Whisper
- .340 Weatherby Magnum
- .348 Winchester
- .35 Remington
- .35 Whelen
- .35 Winchester
- .35 Winchester Self-Loading
- .350 Legend
- .350 Remington Magnum
- .350 Rigby
- .351 Winchester Self-Loading
- .356 Winchester
- .358 Norma Magnum
- .358 Winchester
- .360 Buckhammer
- .360 No 2 Nitro Express
- .360 No 5 Rook
- .369 Nitro Express
- .375 CheyTac
- .375 Dakota
- .375 Flanged Nitro Express
- .375 H&H Magnum
- .375 Remington Ultra Magnum
- .375 Ruger
- .375 SOCOM
- .375 SWISS P
- .375 Viersco Magnum
- .375 Weatherby Magnum
- .375 Winchester
- .376 Steyr
- .378 Weatherby Magnum
- .38 TPC
- .38-40 Winchester
- .38-55 Winchester
- .38-56 WCF
- .38-72 Winchester
- .380 Long

==== .40 caliber – .49 caliber ====
• 40-60 Maynard

- .40-60 Winchester
- .40-65 Winchester
- .40-72 Winchester
- .400 Corbon
- .400 Legend
- .400/350 Nitro Express
- .400/360 Nitro Express
- .400 H&H Magnum
- .400 Jeffery Nitro Express
- .400 Purdey
- .400 Whelen
- .401 Winchester Self-Loading
- .404 Jeffery
- .405 Winchester
- .408 CheyTac
- .416 Barrett
- .416 Remington Magnum
- .416 Rigby
- .416 Ruger
- .416 Taylor
- .416 Weatherby Magnum
- .425 Westley Richards
- .43 Mauser
- .43 Spanish
- .43 Egyptian
- .44-40 Winchester
- .444 Marlin
- .45-60 Winchester
- .45-70
- .45-75 Winchester
- .45-90 Sharps
- .45 Raptor
- .450 Bushmaster
- .45 Black Powder Magnum
- .450 Black Powder Express
- .450/400 Black Powder Express
- .450/400 Nitro Express
- .450 Marlin
- .450 Nitro Express
- .450 No 2 Nitro Express
- .450 Rigby
- .450 Dakota
- .450 Watts Magnum
- .455 Webley
- .458×2-inch American
- .458 Express
- .458 HAM'R
- .458 Lott
- .458 SOCOM
- .458 Winchester Magnum
- .460 Rowland
- .460 S&W Magnum
- .460 Steyr
- .460 Weatherby Magnum
- .461 Gibbs
- .465 H&H Magnum
- .470 Nitro Express
- .475 Nitro Express
- .475 No 2 Nitro Express
- .476 Enfield
- .476 Nitro Express
- .500/450 No 1 Black Powder Express
- .500/450 Nitro Express
- .500/450 Magnum Black Powder Express
- .500/465 Nitro Express

==== .50 caliber and larger ====
- .50 Beowulf
- .500 Wyoming Express
- .50-70 Government
- .50-90 Sharps
- .50-110 Winchester
- .50-140 Sharps
- .500 A-Square
- .500 Jeffery
- .500 Bushwhacker
- .50 Alaskan
- .500 Nitro Express
- .500/450 Magnum Black Powder Express
- .50 BMG
- .577/450 Martini–Henry
- .577/500 Nitro Express
- .577/500 No 2 Black Powder Express
- .505 Gibbs
- .510 DTC Europ
- .510 Whisper
- .55 Boys
- .56-56 Spencer
- 20/577 Alexander Henry
- .577 Black Powder Express
- .577 Nitro Express
- .600/577 Rewa
- .577 Snider
- .577 Tyrannosaur
- .585 Nyati
- .60 caliber (U.S. experimental cartridge, late WWII-era)
- .600 Overkill
- .600 Nitro Express
- .700 Nitro Express
- .950 JDJ

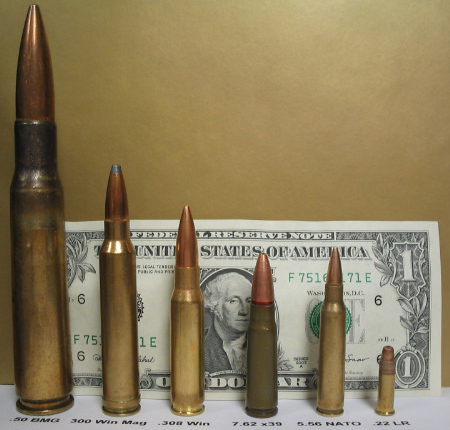
From left to right: .50 BMG, .300 Win Mag, .308 Winchester, 7.62 Soviet, 5.56 NATO, .22LR

=== Metric ===
==== Smaller than 6mm ====
- 4.32x45mm SBR
- 4.38×30mm Libra
- 4.6×36mm
- 4.85×49mm
- 5mm Craig
- 5mm/35 SMc
- 5.45x18mm
- 5.45×39mm
- 5.56×21mm PINDAD
- 5.56×30mm MINSAS
- 5.56×45mm NATO
- 5.6×50mm Magnum
- 5.6×57mm
- 5.6×57mmR
- 5.6×61mm VHSE
- 5.7x28mm
- 5.8x21mm
- 5.8×42mm

==== 6mm–7mm ====
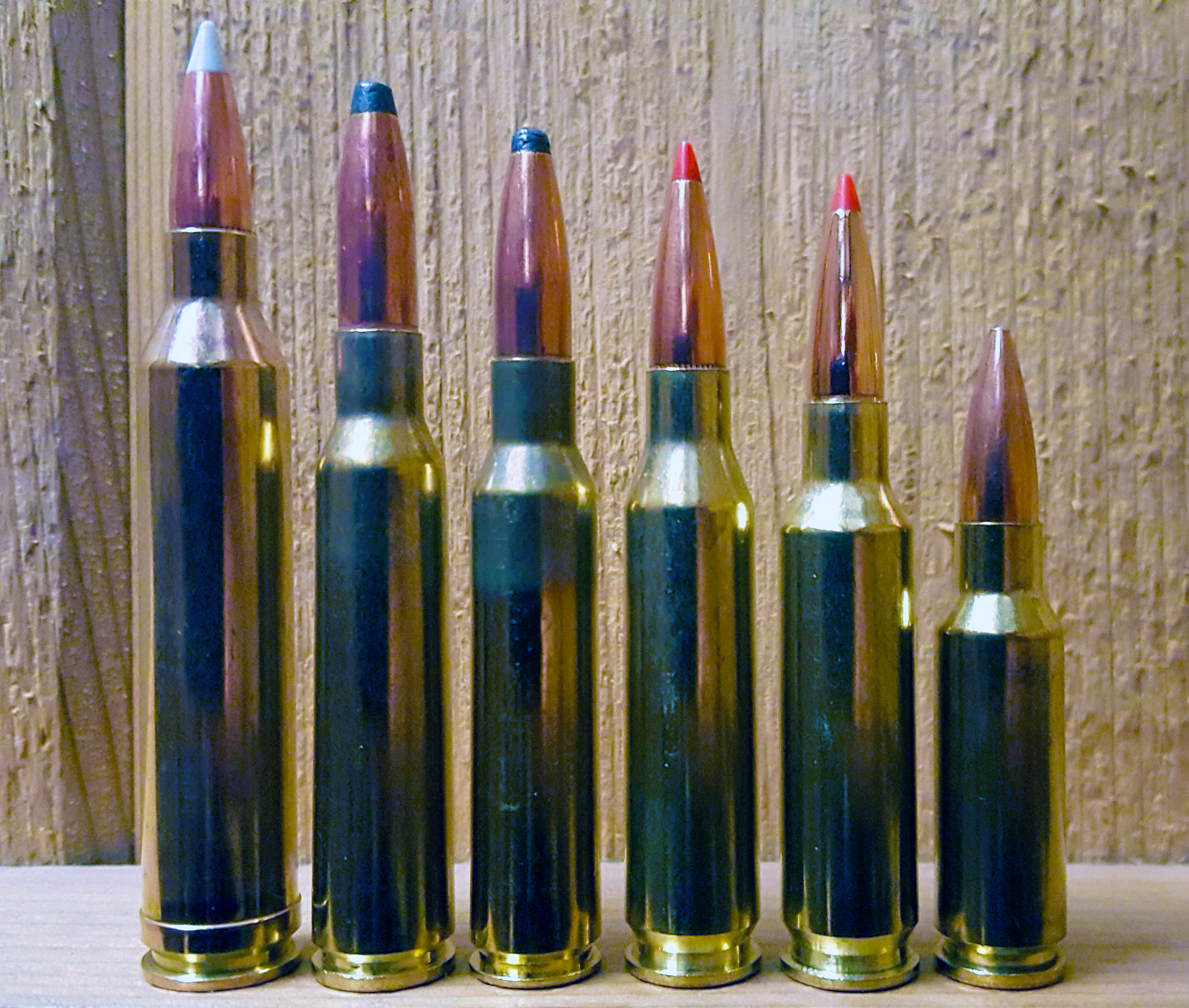
From left to right: .264 Winchester Magnum, 6.5×55mm Swedish, 6.5×52mm Carcano, .260 Remington, 6.5mm Creedmoor, 6.5mm Grendel.

- 6×45mm
- 6mm AR
- 6mm ARC
- 6mm BR Remington
- 6mm Creedmoor
- 6mm Lee Navy
- 6mm Musgrave
- 6mm PPC
- 6mm Remington
- 6mm TCU
- 6mm XC
- 6.5×25mm CBJ
- 6.5×47mm Lapua
- 6.5-06
- 6.5-06 A-Square
- 6.5 PRC
- 6.5mm Creedmoor
- 6.5mm Grendel
- 6.5-284 Norma
- 6.5mm Remington Magnum
- 6.5mm TCU
- 6.5×50mm Arisaka
- 6.5×52mm Carcano
- 6.5×53mmR
- 6.5×54mm Mannlicher–Schönauer
- 6.5×55mm Swedish
- 6.5×57mm Mauser
- 6.5×58mm Vergueiro
- 6.5×68mm
- 6.5-300 Weatherby Magnum
- 6.8x51mm
- 6.8mm Remington SPC
- 6.8 Western

==== 7mm–8mm ====
- 7mm BR Remington
- 7×54mm Finnish
- 7×54mm Fournier
- 7×57mm Mauser
- 7×64mm Brenneke
- 7mm-08 Remington
- 7mm Backcountry
- 7mm PRC
- 7mm Remington Magnum
- 7mm Remington Short Action Ultra Magnum
- 7mm Remington Ultra Magnum
- 7×61mm Sharpe & Hart
- 7mm Shooting Times Westerner
- 7mm Weatherby Magnum
- 7mm Winchester Short Magnum
- 7-30 Waters
- 7×33mm Sako
- 7.35×51mm Carcano
- 7.5x23mmR
- 7.5x27mm
- 7.5×54mm French
- 7.5×55mm Swiss
- 7.5×57mm MAS
- 7.62×25mm Tokarev
- 7.62×35mm
- 7.62×37mm Musang
- 7.62×38mmR
- 7.62×39mm
- 7.62×40 Wilson Tactical
- 7.62×45mm vz. 52
- 7.62×51mm NATO
- 7.62×53mmR
- 7.62×54mmR
- 7.62 Thumper
- 7.63×25mm Mauser
- 7.65×20mm Long
- 7.65×21mm Parabellum
- 7.65×25mm Borchardt
- 7.65×53mm Mauser
- 7.7×58mm Arisaka
- 7.92×33mm Kurz
- 7.92×36mm EPK
- 7.92×57mm Mauser
- 7.92×94mm Patronen
- 7.92×107mm DS

==== 8mm–9mm ====
- 8mm Roth–Steyr
- 8×22mm Nambu
- 8mm-06
- 8mm Lebel
- 8mm Remington Magnum
- 8×50mmR Mannlicher
- 8x52mmR Mannlicher
- 8×56mmR
- 8×57mm IS
- 8×58mmR Danish Krag
- 8×59mm Rb Breda
- 8×60mm S
- 8×63mm patron m/32
- 8×64mm S
- 8×68mm S
- 8.6mm Blackout

==== 9mm and larger ====
- 9×21mm Gyurza
- 9×23mm Largo
- 9×25mm Super Auto G
- 9×30mm Grom
- 9×39mm
- 9×53mmR
- 9×57mm Mauser
- 9.3×57mm
- 9.3×62mm
- 9.3×64mm Brenneke
- 9.3×74mmR
- 9.5×57mm Mannlicher–Schoenauer
- 10.15×61mmR
- 10.6×25mmR
- 10.75×68mm
- 11×58mmR
- 11×59mmR Gras
- 11×60mm Mauser
- 11.3×36mmR
- 11.35x51mmR
- 12.17×42mm RF
- 12.7×55mm
- 12.7x81mmSR
- 12.7×99mm NATO
- 12.7×108mm
- 13.2×92mmSR
- 13.2×99mm Hotchkiss Long
- 14.5×114mm
- 14.5mm JDJ
- 15.2mm Steyr
- 20×82mm
- 20×110mm
- 20x138mmB
- 23x115mm
- 23x152mm
- 24x139mm Swiss
- 25×137mm
- 30×165mm
- 30x173mm
- 37×145mmR
