= ICL cartridges =

Gun cartridges

.300 ICL Grizzly
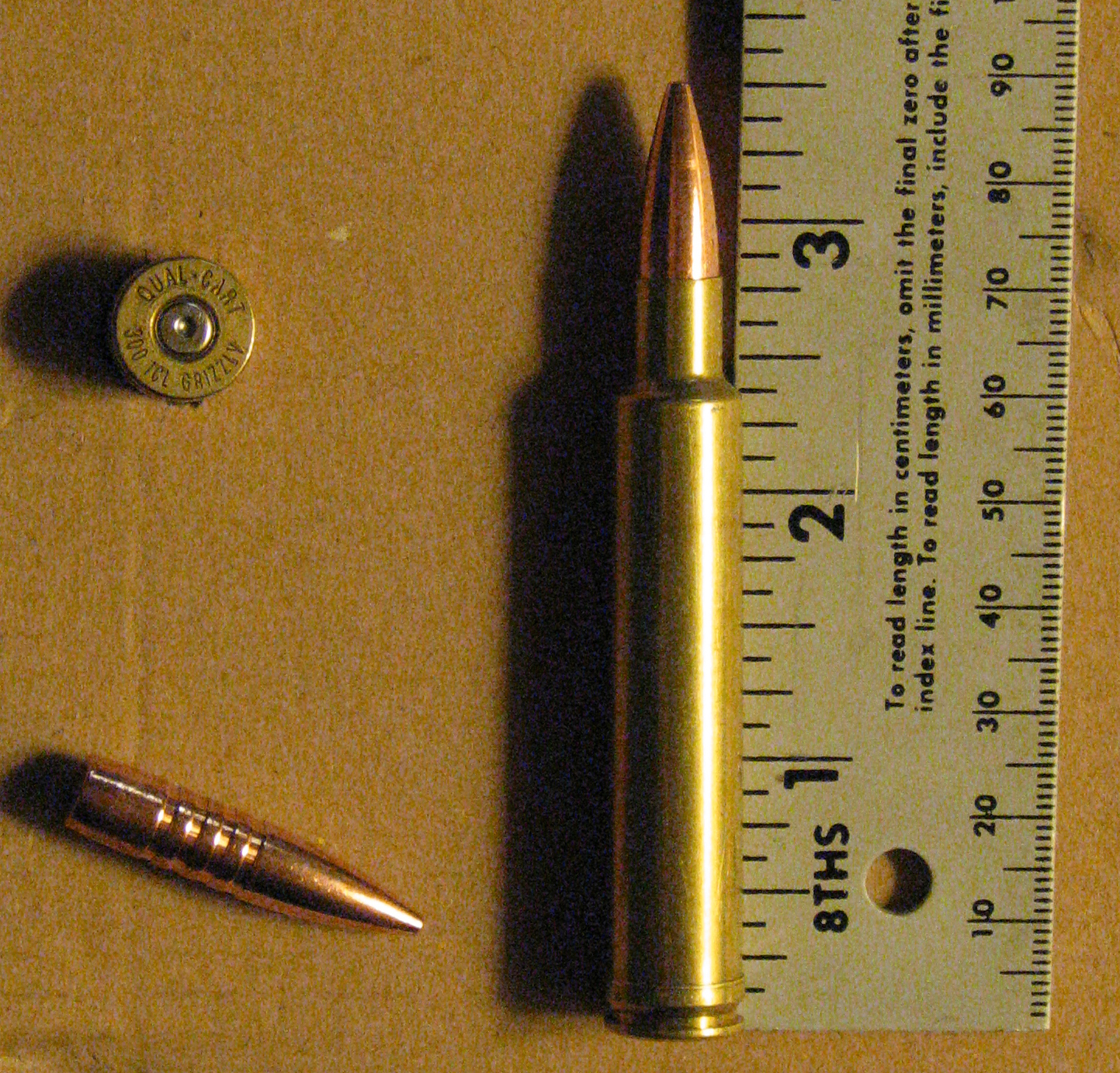
- .300 ICL Grizzly with Barnes 180 gr triple-shock bullet
- Type: Rifle
- Place of origin: United States

Production history
- Designer: Vern S. Juenke
- Designed: 1960s
- Manufacturer: Saturn Rifle
- Produced: 1960s

Specifications
- Parent case: .300 H&H Magnum
- Case type: Belted Bottleneck
- Bullet diameter: .308 in (7.8 mm)
- Neck diameter: .340 in (8.6 mm)
- Shoulder diameter: .460 in (11.7 mm)
- Base diameter: .532 in (13.5 mm)
- Rim diameter: .532 in (13.5 mm)
- Rim thickness: .05 in (1.3 mm)
- Case length: 2.610 in (66.3 mm)
- Overall length: 3.540 in (89.9 mm)
- Case capacity: 82.8 gr H_{2}O (5.37 cm^{3})
- Rifling twist: 1-10
- Primer type: Large rifle magnum
- Maximum CUP: 65000 CUP

Ballistic performance
Bullet mass/type	Velocity	Energy
150 gr (10 g) SP	3,590 ft/s (1,090 m/s)	4,292 ft⋅lbf (5,819 J)
180 gr (12 g) SP	3,460 ft/s (1,050 m/s)	4,784 ft⋅lbf (6,486 J)
220 gr (14 g) SP	3,200 ft/s (980 m/s)	5,002 ft⋅lbf (6,782 J)

ICL cartridges (ICL stands for Increased Case Load) are rare hunting wildcat cartridges developed by Arnold & Vern Juenke, gunsmiths who owned Saturn Gun Works in Reno, Nevada. ICL cartridges are wildcats based on conventional cases in use at the time. They feature a 45 degree shoulder and the sides are straightened out compared to the parent cartridge. Most of the cartridges are considered improved cartridges since they simply create more powder space while maintaining the same caliber as the parent cartridge. Most of the line of cartridges carries an animal name in addition to a numeric designation. It is one of the most complete lines of wildcats, having a large number of cartridges with a variety of calibers.

Quality Cartridge is the only manufacturer making new brass cases correctly headstamped for many ICL cartridges.

== .22 caliber cartridges ==
=== .22 ICL Gopher ===
Based on an improved .22 Hornet, it is similar to the K-hornet. Performance using a 40-grain (2.6 g) bullet is 2,515 to 2,705 ft/s (767 to 824 m/s).

=== .218 ICL Bobcat ===
Based on the .218 Bee. It's similar to the Mashburn Bee and the R-2 Lovell and can move a 40-grain (2.6 g) bullet at 2,675 to 3,125 ft/s (815 to 952 m/s)

=== .224 ICL Benchrester ===
Based on the .250-3000 Savage case, with performance similar to a .219 Wasp. Performance for a 45-grain (2.9 g) bullet is 3,341 to 3,921 ft/s (1,018 to 1,195 m/s), for a 55-grain (3.6 g) bullet is 3,211 to 3,721 ft/s (979 to 1,134 m/s), and for a 63-grain (4.1 g) bullet is approximately 3,000 ft/s (910 m/s),

=== .219 ICL Wolverine ===
Based on a .219 Zipper Improved, the Wolverine is useful for varmint hunting, such as woodchucks. Performance with a 45-grain (2.9 g) bullet is approximately 3,750 ft/s (1,140 m/s) and with a 55-grain (3.6 g) bullet is approximately 3,450 ft/s (1,050 m/s)

=== .224 ICL Marmot ===
The Marmot is based on the .220 Swift with improved characteristics such as steeper sides and shoulder angle, but is not improved in the sense that you cannot fire form factory ammunition in its chamber. Performance with a 50-grain (3.2 g) bullet is approximately 3,875 ft/s (1,181 m/s) and with a 55-grain (3.6 g) bullet is approximately 3,755 ft/s (1,145 m/s). P.O. Ackley noted that it is more efficient than standard .220 Swift improved cartridges, and not over-bore.

== .24-.26 caliber cartridges ==
=== .25 ICL Magnum ===
The .25 ICL is a necked-down improved version of the .264 Winchester Magnum. It is similar to the .257 Weatherby. Performance with a 87-grain (5.6 g) bullet is approximately 3,900 ft/s (1,200 m/s) and with a 100-grain (6.5 g) bullet is approximately 3,700 ft/s (1,100 m/s).

=== .25-35 ICL Coyote ===
Based on the .25-35 Winchester and similar to the .25/35 Ackley Improved. Can also be made by necking-down .30-30. P.O. Ackley calls it "efficient and surprising". Performance with a 87-grain (5.6 g) bullet is approximately 3,100 ft/s (940 m/s) and with a 100-grain (6.5 g) bullet is approximately 2,650 ft/s (810 m/s).

=== .257 ICL Whitetail ===
The Whitetail is based on the .257 Roberts and is a standard improved cartridge. Performance with a 100-grain (6.5 g) bullet is approximately 3,200 ft/s (980 m/s) and with a 117-grain (7.6 g) bullet is approximately 3,040 ft/s (930 m/s).

=== .25-270 ICL Ram ===
The Ram is based on a .270 Winchester that is necked-down and blown-out. At the time it was considered an over-bore cartridge, before the advent of more appropriate slower-burning powder. Performance with a 100-grain (6.5 g) bullet is approximately 3,700 ft/s (1,100 m/s) and with a 117-grain (7.6 g) bullet is approximately 3,450 ft/s (1,050 m/s).

=== 6.5 ICL Boar ===
The Boar is based on a .270 Winchester that is necked-down and blown-out. Performance with a 150-grain (9.7 g) bullet is approximately 2,855 ft/s (870 m/s).

=== 6.5mm ICL Magnum ===
The 6.5 ICL is an improved .264 Winchester Magnum but with a longer neck for easier handloading. Performance with a 120-grain (7.8 g) bullet is approximately 3,545 ft/s (1,081 m/s) and with a 140-grain (9.1 g) bullet is approximately 3,315 ft/s (1,010 m/s).

== .27-.28 caliber cartridges ==
=== .277 ICL Flying Saucer ===
The Flying Saucer is a necked-up blown-out .257 Roberts. Performance with a 140-grain (9.1 g) bullet is approximately 3,150 ft/s (960 m/s) and with a 175-grain (11.3 g) bullet is approximately 2,565 ft/s (782 m/s).

=== .270 ICL Magnum ===
The .270 ICL is an improved .264 Winchester Magnum necked up to .270. It's a relatively efficient cartridge for its class. Performance with a 130-grain (8.4 g) bullet is approximately 3,405 ft/s (1,038 m/s) and with a 150-grain (9.7 g) bullet is approximately 3,250 ft/s (990 m/s).

=== 7mm ICL Magnum ===
The 7mm ICL is an improved .264 Winchester Magnum necked up to .7mm. Performance with a 140-grain (9.1 g) bullet is approximately 3,405 ft/s (1,038 m/s) and with a 160-grain (10 g) bullet is approximately 3,230 ft/s (980 m/s).

=== 7mm ICL Tortilla ===
The Tortilla is an improved 7x57. Performance with a 100-grain (6.5 g) bullet is approximately 3,200 ft/s (980 m/s) and with a 117-grain (7.6 g) bullet is approximately 3,040 ft/s (930 m/s).

=== 7mm ICL Wapiti ===
The Wapiti is a more complicated wildcat based on the .300 H&H Magnum being necked-down, trimmed, and then fire-formed. The large case is well-suited to heavy bullets. Performance with a 160-grain (10 g) bullet is approximately 3,225 ft/s (983 m/s).

== .30 caliber cartridges ==
=== .300 ICL Tornado ===
The Tornado is based on a .257 Roberts case that is improved and necked to .30 caliber, essentially the same as the .277 ICL Flying Saucer, but necked-up. Performance with a 150-grain (9.7 g) bullet is up to 3,360 ft/s (1,020 m/s), with a 180-grain (12 g) bullet is up to 3,030 ft/s (920 m/s) and with a 220-grain (14 g) bullet is up to 2,800 ft/s (850 m/s).

=== .30/06 ICL Caribou ===
The Caribou is an improved .30-06. With heavy bullets it can reach the same level as factory loads for the .300 H&H Magnum. Performance with a 150-grain (9.7 g) bullet is up to 3,041 ft/s (927 m/s), with a 180-grain (12 g) bullet is up to 2,791 ft/s (851 m/s) and with a 220-grain (14 g) bullet is up to 2,336 ft/s (712 m/s).

=== .30 ICL Grizzly Cub ===
The Grizzly Cub is a shortened magnum for standard length actions. It's created by re-forming either a .338 Winchester Magnum or .308 Norma Magnum. P.O. Ackley favored short .30 caliber magnums and called it "highly recommended." Performance with a 150-grain (9.7 g) bullet is up to 3,590 ft/s (1,090 m/s), with a 180-grain (12 g) bullet is up to 3,200 ft/s (980 m/s) and with a 220-grain (14 g) bullet is up to 2,705 ft/s (824 m/s).

=== .300 ICL Grizzly ===
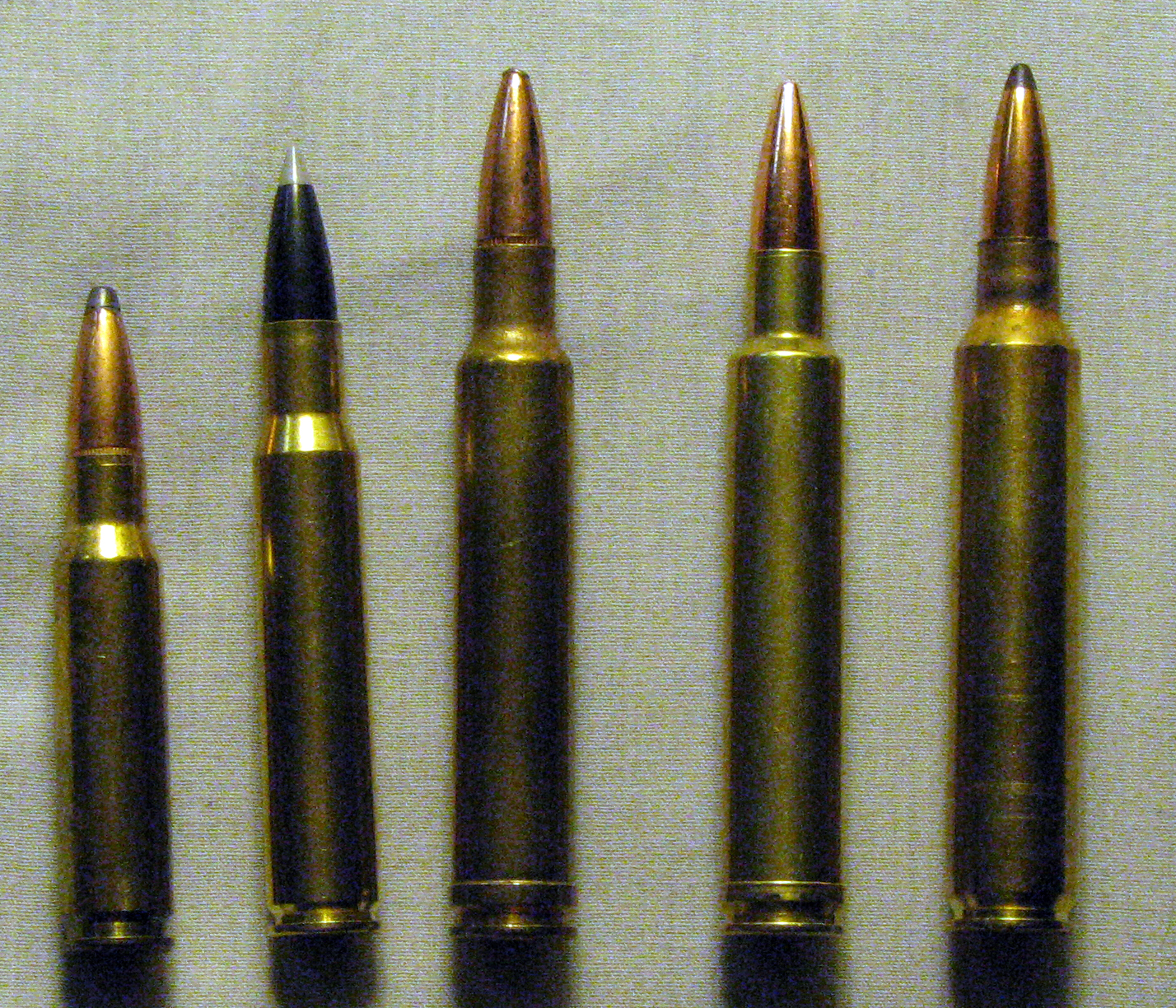
Left to right: .308 Win, .30-06, .300 Weatherby, .300 ICL Grizzly, .300 RUM

.300 ICL Grizzly' is based on the .300 H&H Magnum, and indeed the two are so similar that .300 H&H ammunition can safely be fired through a rifle chambered in .300 ICL Grizzly, as can the ammunition of another .300 H&H-based cartridge, the .300 Weatherby Magnum. The casings will fireform upon discharge.

=== .30 ICL Magnum ===
The .30 ICL is an improved .264 Winchester Magnum necked up to .308 and a pushed-back shoulder to create the steep angle common to all ICL cartridges and a long neck for improved handloading. Performance with a 150-grain (9.7 g) bullet is approximately 3,545 ft/s (1,081 m/s) and with a 180-grain (12 g) bullet is approximately 3,185 ft/s (971 m/s).

=== .300 ICL Magnum ===
The .300 ICL is an improved .300 H&H Magnum. Performance with a 180-grain (12 g) bullet is approximately 3,415 ft/s (1,041 m/s) and with a 200-grain (13 g) bullet is approximately 3,145 ft/s (959 m/s).

=== .303 ICL Improved ===
The .303 is an improved cartridge based on the .303 British and works well in Enfield and single-shot actions. Performance with a 150-grain (9.7 g) bullet is up to 3,235 ft/s (986 m/s) and with a 180-grain (12 g) bullet is up to 2,870 ft/s (870 m/s).

== .37 caliber cartridges ==
=== .375 ICL Kodiak ===
The Kodiak is an improved cartridge based on the .375 H&H Magnum that is similar to the .375 Weatherby Magnum. Performance with a 270-grain (17 g) bullet is 2,885 ft/s (879 m/s) and with a 300-grain (19 g) bullet is up to 2,720 ft/s (830 m/s).

=== .375 ICL Magnum ===
The .375 ICL is an improved .375 H&H Magnum. Performance with a 270-grain (17 g) bullet is approximately 2,995 ft/s (913 m/s) and with a 300-grain (19 g) bullet is approximately 2,843 ft/s (867 m/s).

== See also ==
- List of rifle cartridges
