= Townsend Whelen =

American hunter and author (1877–1961)

- Born: March 6, 1877; Philadelphia, Pennsylvania, U.S.
- Died: December 23, 1961 (aged 84); St, Louis, Missouri, U.S.
- Burial place: Arlington National Cemetery, Virginia, U.S.
- Spouse: Mary (Pratt) Whelen
- Military career
- Allegiance: United States of America
- Branch: United States National Guard; United States Army
- Service years: 1895–1899 (National Guard); 1902–1936 (Army)
- Rank: Colonel

Townsend Whelen (March 6, 1877 – December 23, 1961), called "Townie" by his friends, was an American hunter, soldier, writer, outdoorsman and rifleman.

Whelen was a colonel in the United States Army, and a prolific writer on guns and hunting, writing over two thousand magazine articles in his career. He was a contributing editor to Sports Afield, American Rifleman, Field and Stream, Outdoor Life, Guns & Ammo, and other magazines, and author of Suggestions to Military Riflemen, The American Rifle, Telescopic Rifle Sights, The Hunting Rifle, Small Arms and Ballistics, Hunting Big Game (of which he was the editor), Amateur Gunsmithing, and Why Not Load Your Own. An autobiography, Mr. Rifleman, was begun by Whelen, but finished by his family and published after his death. Whelen edited and wrote the introduction to WDM Bell's autobiography "Bell of Africa" and arranged an American publisher. An expert rifleman with few peers, Whelen could reportedly hit man-sized target at 200 yards using the bolt action, open-sighted M1903 Springfield .30-06 service rifle, scoring six hits in ten seconds flat, and could do it on command.

Colonel Whelen experimented with the service .30-06 Springfield cartridge while he was commanding officer of Frankford Arsenal in the early 1920s. Frankford Arsenal machine shop foreman James Howe, who later formed the rifle-making firm of Griffin & Howe, assisted Whelen modifying the .30-06 case to fire bullets of different calibers. Whelen was particularly interested in creating a cartridge to fire heavier bullets from M1903 rifle actions available from the Civilian Marksmanship Program.

Townsend Whelen's passion was the outdoors and hunting, and he undertook many expeditions into the wilderness of both North and South America, hunting and exploring. Apart from his professional interest in the rifle as a military weapon and competitive target shooting, he also experimented with rifles and cartridges in survival and wilderness applications, using the different loads in his hunting rifles to take both small and large game while on long hunting excursions in the wilds.

The comprehensive knowledge and experience reflected in Whelen's writing covered the black powder era at the end of the 1800s and spanned the transitional period into smokeless arms, resulting in the modern high velocity rifles of the 20th century.

== Quotes ==
- "Only accurate rifles are interesting".
- "The .30-06 is never a mistake".

== Cartridges ==
- .25 Whelen
- .35 Whelen
- .375 Whelen
- .400 Whelen

== See also ==
- List of famous big game hunters
