= .400 Whelen =

Rifle cartridge

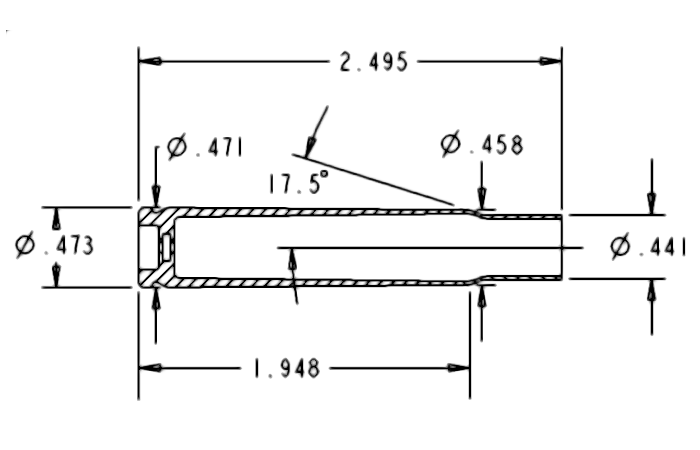
- Type: Rifle
- Place of origin: United States

Production history
- Designer: Townsend Whelen
- Designed: early 1920s

Specifications
- Parent case: .30-06 Springfield

Ballistic performance
| Bullet mass/type | Velocity | Energy |
|---|---|---|
| 300 gr (19 g) SP | 2,300 ft/s (700 m/s) | 3,522 ft⋅lbf (4,775 J) |
| 350 gr (23 g) | 2,100 ft/s (640 m/s) | 3,430 ft⋅lbf (4,650 J) |
- Source(s): 350gr - Barnes

The .400 Whelen cartridge was developed by Colonel Townsend Whelen while he was commanding officer of Frankford Arsenal in the early 1920s. The cartridge resembles a .30-06 Springfield case necked up to .40 caliber to accept bullets manufactured for the .405 Winchester.

== Design ==
Colonel Whelen asserted the very small remaining portion of the .30-06's 17° 30′ angled shoulder was likely to cause potentially dangerous headspace difficulties. The headspace issue has been widely discussed. Frankford Arsenal machine shop foreman James Howe necked down cylindrical brass available in the arsenal manufacturing process to form cartridges with a .458-inch-diameter (11.6 mm) shoulder to fit the chamber of his rifles. Experimenters had less success forming cartridges by enlarging the necks of .30-06 cartridges with .441-inch-diameter (11.2 mm) (or smaller) shoulders, but could form brass from .35 Whelen cases.

Quality Cartridge has manufactured unformed, cylindrical empty brass cases headstamped for this cartridge.

== Performance ==
Griffin & Howe chambered custom-built rifles for this cartridge; and using neck resizing with cases carefully fire formed to the chamber in which the loaded cartridges were to be used, these rifles were reportedly very effective for killing elk, moose, and bear at ranges up to 400 yards (370 m).

== See also ==
- List of rifle cartridges
- .30-06 descendants
