= .338-06 =

Rifle cartridge

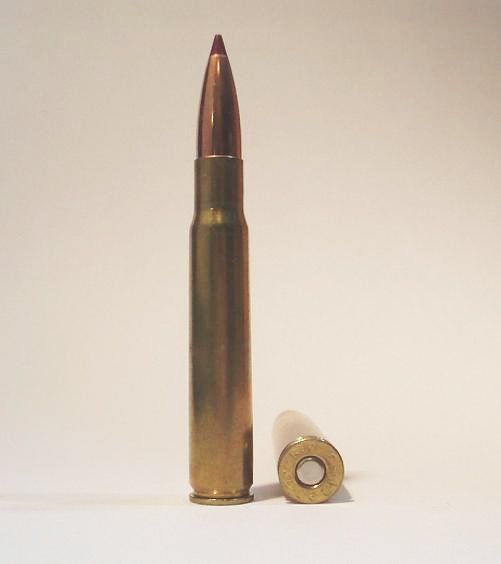
- Type: Rifle
- Place of origin: USA

Specifications
- Parent case: .30-06 Springfield
- Case type: Rimless, bottleneck
- Bullet diameter: .338 in (8.6 mm)
- Neck diameter: .369 in (9.4 mm)
- Shoulder diameter: .441 in (11.2 mm)
- Base diameter: .472 in (12.0 mm)
- Rim diameter: .473 in (12.0 mm)
- Case length: 2.494 in (63.3 mm)
- Overall length: 3.37 in (86 mm)
- Rifling twist: 10
- Primer type: Large rifle

Ballistic performance
Bullet mass/type	Velocity	Energy
200 gr (13 g) SP	2,773 ft/s (845 m/s)	3,414 ft⋅lbf (4,629 J)
225 gr (15 g) SP	2,678 ft/s (816 m/s)	3,582 ft⋅lbf (4,857 J)
250 gr (16 g) SP	2,531 ft/s (771 m/s)	3,555 ft⋅lbf (4,820 J)
- Test barrel length: 23; Source: Speer Reloading Manual #14

The .338-06, also known as the .338 A-Square, is a cartridge based on the .30-06. As such, it allows heavier .338 caliber bullets to be used from the .30-06 non-belted case. This can be a suitable choice for heavy bodied game such as moose, elk, and brown bear. The number and variety of .338 caliber bullets increased after the introduction in the late 1950s of the .338 Winchester Magnum cartridge, frequently chambered in the Winchester Model 70 rifle. More recently the introduction of the .338 Lapua Magnum has caused an increase in interest in the .338 caliber and their projectiles. The .338-06 maintains many of the benefits of the .338 Winchester Magnum cartridge but has substantially less recoil, makes more efficient use of powder, and allows use of widely available .30-06 commercial and military cases. It is similar in concept to the older wildcat .333 OKH cartridge, as well as the .35 Whelen, which also use the .30-06 brass case as a basis for the cartridge. Thanks to the large number of rifles based on the .30-06 family of cartridges, having a .338-06 made usually only requires a simple barrel change by a competent gun smith. Since the 1960s a relatively obscure cartridge only known to handloaders and "Wildcatters", eventually A-Square adopted the caliber as the .338-06 A-Square in approximately 1998. They then submitted it for approval by SAAMI as a standardized caliber. Weatherby offered factory rifles and ammunition, but has now dropped the rifles from its inventory. The .338-06 A-Square tends to have a velocity advantage over the .35 Whelen, and uses bullets that retain velocity and resist wind drift better than similar weight bullets fired from the .35 Whelen due to an improved Sectional density.

== Practical Use ==
The .338-06 is a versatile cartridge for hunting bigger game. Loaded with light weight bullets, such as the 180gr. Nosler Accubond, it is adequate for species like deer or pronghorn at medium to long range, and when loaded with heavier premium bullets like the 225gr. Nosler Partition or even the 250gr partition the .338-06 can handle the largest North America game including moose and brown bear.

Rifles chambered in .338-06 need not be as heavy as a .338 Winchester Magnum or other .338 magnums; therefore, .338-06 chambered rifles are desirable for mountain hunting or where excessive weight is an issue. While the .338-06 performs well from a 22" barrel most magnum rifle cartridges in the same caliber, such as the .340 Weatherby Magnum, require a longer 24-26" barrel to reach their full potential.

== See also ==
- List of rifle cartridges
- 8 mm caliber Other cartridges in the same diameter range.
- .30-06 Springfield wildcat cartridges

== Bibliography ==
- Reloading Manual #14. ATK/Speer. 2008. ISBN 978-0-9791860-0-4.
