= .14-222 =

Rifle cartridge

- Type: Rifle
- Place of origin: United States

Production history
- Designer: Helmut W. Sakschek
- Designed: 1985

Specifications
- Parent case: .222 Remington
- Case type: Rimless, bottleneck
- Bullet diameter: .14 in (3.6 mm)

Ballistic performance
Bullet mass/type	Velocity	Energy
11.4 gr (1 g) HP	4,200 ft/s (1,300 m/s)	461 ft⋅lbf (625 J)

The .14-222 is a wildcat cartridge that was created in 1985 by Helmut W. Sakschek. It uses a .222 Remington case necked down to accept a .14 caliber bullet.

== See also ==
- List of rifle cartridges
