= .17-223 =

Rifle cartridge

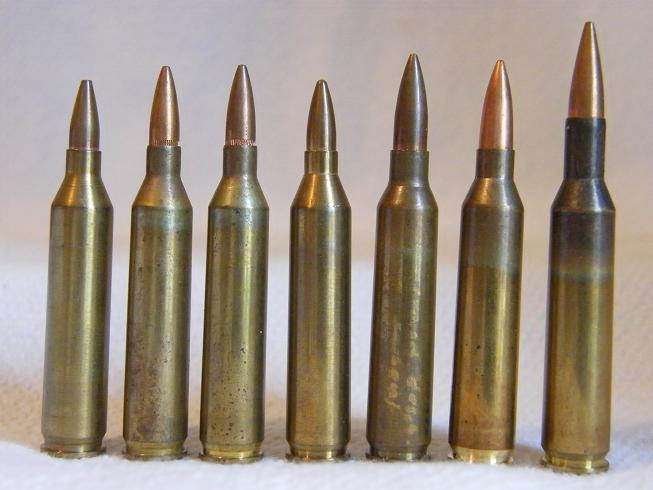
- Left to right: .17/223 Norma Experimental, .17-223 Frankford Arsenal Experimental F A 7 2, .17-223 Frankford Arsenal Experimental F A 7 3, 4.3x45 D.A.G. Experimental DAG 4.3X45, 4.9x45 D.A.G. Experimental DAG .223, 4.7x45 Experimental DAG 4.7 MM, 4.85x49 Experimental XL1E1 RG 77 4.85
- Type: Rifle
- Place of origin: United States

Specifications
- Parent case: .223 Remington
- Case type: Rimless, bottleneck
- Bullet diameter: .172 in (4.4 mm)
- Neck diameter: .203 in (5.2 mm)
- Shoulder diameter: .358 in (9.1 mm)
- Base diameter: .376 in (9.6 mm)
- Rim diameter: .378 in (9.6 mm)
- Case length: 1.76 in (45 mm)
- Overall length: 2.15 in (55 mm)
- Primer type: Small rifle

Ballistic performance
Bullet mass/type	Velocity	Energy
25 gr (2 g) Hornady	3,929 ft/s (1,198 m/s)	875 ft⋅lbf (1,186 J)
25 gr (2 g) Hornady	3,940 ft/s (1,200 m/s)	862 ft⋅lbf (1,169 J)
25 gr (2 g) Hornady	3,989 ft/s (1,216 m/s)	883 ft⋅lbf (1,197 J)
- Test barrel length: 22 in (560 mm); Source: Ammo Guide

The .17-223 / 4.4x45mm is a centerfire wildcat rifle cartridge. It is based on the .223 Remington, but the neck is re-sized to accept a .17 caliber bullet. The .17 Remington is nearly identical, but on the latter the shoulder is moved .087 in (2.2 mm) back to allow a longer case neck.

== See also ==
- .17 Remington
- List of rifle cartridges
- 4 mm caliber
