= 6.5-06 A-Square =

US centerfire rifle cartridge

- Type: Centerfire rifle
- Place of origin: United States

Production history
- Designer: A-Square
- Designed: 1997

Specifications
- Parent case: .30-06 Springfield
- Case type: Rimless, bottleneck
- Bullet diameter: .264 in (6.7 mm)
- Neck diameter: .296 in (7.5 mm)
- Shoulder diameter: .4425 in (11.24 mm)
- Base diameter: .4698 in (11.93 mm)
- Rim diameter: .473 in (12.0 mm)
- Rim thickness: .034 in (0.86 mm)
- Case length: 2.494 in (63.3 mm)
- Overall length: 3.44 in (87 mm)
- Case capacity: 65.7 gr H2O
- Rifling twist: 1-9"
- Primer type: Large rifle
- Maximum pressure: 60,200 psi (415 MPa)

Ballistic performance
| Bullet mass/type | Velocity | Energy |
|---|---|---|
| 100 gr (6 g) Nosler Ballistic Tip | 3,400 ft/s (1,000 m/s) | 2,566 ft⋅lbf (3,479 J) |
| 140 gr (9 g) Nosler Partition | 3,000 ft/s (910 m/s) | 2,797 ft⋅lbf (3,792 J) |

The 6.5-06 A-Square is a centerfire rifle cartridge that originated as a wildcat, based on the popular .30-06 Springfield. A-Square standardized the dimensions of the cartridge and submitted them to SAAMI in 1997.

== Design ==
The 6.5-06 A-Square uses a .264" diameter bullet loaded into a modified .30-06 Springfield cartridge. The neck is reduced to accept the smaller bullet, the shoulder is longer than that of the parent cartridge, and it has a 17.5 degree shoulder angle leading to the neck of the case, where the bullet is seated. The Ackley Improved version of the cartridge uses a sharper shoulder angle and has a case capacity of 72 gr of water.

== Uses ==
The 6.5-06 A-Square has power similar to that of the .270 Winchester and .308 Winchester, making it suitable for hunting medium-sized game such as deer and black bear. It is also used in competitions such as F-Class and Benchrest formats.

== Availability of ammunition ==
Currently (2011) none of the major commercial ammunition manufacturers offer factory loaded 6.5-06 A-Square ammunition. There are smaller companies that custom load the cartridge however, and hand-loading can be accomplished using the proper set of dies and using .25-06 Remington, .270 Winchester, or .30-06 Springfield brass and making the proper modifications to fit the 6.5-06 A-Square chamber. After firing, the brass from the original cartridge will be fire-formed to the exact dimensions of the 6.5-06 A-Square chamber.

== Firearms chambered for 6.5-06 A-Square ==
As of 2011, A-Square listed two different rifles factory chambered in 6.5-06 A-Square; the Hamilcar and the Genghis Khan. Several of the major custom barrel manufacturers offer the 6.5-06 A-Square (sometimes listed simply as 6.5-06) chamber as an option for builders of custom rifles. However, on 15 February 2012, the A-Square Company ceased to exist.

== See also ==
- List of rifle cartridges
- Glossary of firearms terminology
- .30-06 Springfield wildcat cartridges
