= .375 Viersco Magnum =

Rifle cartridge

- Type: Rifle
- Place of origin: United States

Production history
- Designer: Viersco, MFG
- Manufacturer: Viersco

Specifications
- Parent case: Unique
- Case type: Rimless, bottleneck
- Bullet diameter: .375 in. (9.5mm)
- Neck diameter: .398 in (10.11 mm)
- Shoulder diameter: .664 in (16.86 mm)
- Base diameter: .680 in (17.272 mm)
- Rim diameter: .675 in (17.145 mm)
- Rim thickness: .065 in (1.7 mm)
- Case length: 3.445 in (87.5 mm)
- Overall length: 4.150 in (105.41 mm)
- Case capacity: 190 gr H_{2}O (12 cm^{3})
- Rifling twist: 1 in 10 in (254 mm) or 1 in 7 in (180 mm)
- Primer type: Large rifle
- Maximum pressure: 64,800 psi (447 MPa)

Ballistic performance
Bullet mass/type	Velocity	Energy
300 gr (19 g) SP	2,840 ft/s (870 m/s)	5,374 ft⋅lbf (7,286 J)
350 gr (23 g) DGS	2,660 ft/s (810 m/s)	5,500 ft⋅lbf (7,500 J)
375 gr (24 g)	2,326 ft/s (709 m/s)	4,506 ft⋅lbf (6,109 J)
- Test barrel length: 26; Source: Viersco Mfg

The .375 Viersco Magnum (9.5 x 87.5mm) is a rimless, magnum-length rifle cartridge designed for the hunting of large game and long-range competition shooting. The case is engineered with a wider than typical .532" or .640" magnum base, increasing case volume to improve long-range performance.
