= .22 Creedmoor =

Rifle cartridge

- Type: Rifle
- Place of origin: United States

Production history
- Designer: Hornady
- Designed: 2023
- Manufacturer: Hornady
- Produced: 2024–present

Specifications
- Parent case: 6.5mm Creedmoor
- Case type: Rimless, bottleneck
- Bullet diameter: .224 in (5.7 mm)
- Neck diameter: .256 in (6.5 mm)
- Base diameter: .4703 in (11.95 mm)
- Rim diameter: .472 in (12.0 mm)
- Rim thickness: .054 in (1.4 mm)
- Case length: 1.92 in (49 mm)
- Overall length: 2.45 in (62.23 mm)
- Rifling twist: 1 in 8 in (200 mm)
- Maximum pressure (SAAMI): 62,000 psi (430 MPa)

Ballistic performance
Bullet mass/type	Velocity	Energy
65 gr (4 g) 22 Creedmoor 65 gr CX Superformance	3,660 ft/s (1,120 m/s)	1,925 ft⋅lbf (2,610 J)
80 gr (5 g) 22 Creedmoor 80 gr. ELD Match	3,285 ft/s (1,001 m/s)	1,917 ft⋅lbf (2,599 J)
80 gr (5 g) 22 Creedmoor 80 gr. ELD‑X® Precision Hunter	3,285 ft/s (1,001 m/s)	1,917 ft⋅lbf (2,599 J)
69 gr (4 g) 22 Creedmoor 69 gr. ELD-VT V-MATCH Match	3,560 ft/s (1,090 m/s)	1,958 ft⋅lbf (2,655 J)
- Test barrel length: 24 in Source: SAAMI

The .22 Creedmoor, is a SAAMI-standardized rimless tapered bottleneck rifle cartridge released by Hornady in 2024. It is a necked-down 6.5mm Creedmoor that holds 0.224-inch-diameter bullets.

The cartridge was designed for varmint hunting, deer‑sized game and long‑range target shooting.

The .22 Creedmoor is known for its high muzzle velocity and relatively flat trajectory, characteristics that make it well suited for long-range shooting with reduced wind drift.

== See also ==
- List of rifle cartridges
- .22-250 Remington
