= .260 Remington =

American rifle cartridge

- .260 Remington cartridge with a 120 grain Remington Core-Lokt bullet
- Type: Rifle
- Place of origin: United States

Production history
- Manufacturer: Remington Arms Company
- Produced: 1997

Specifications
- Parent case: .308 Winchester
- Case type: Rimless, bottleneck
- Bullet diameter: .264 in (6.7 mm)
- Neck diameter: .2969 in (7.54 mm)
- Shoulder diameter: .4539 in (11.53 mm)
- Base diameter: .4705 in (11.95 mm)
- Rim diameter: .4728 in (12.01 mm)
- Rim thickness: .0539 in (1.37 mm)
- Case length: 2.035 in (51.7 mm)
- Overall length: 2.800 in (71.1 mm)
- Case capacity: 53.5 gr H_{2}O (3.47 cm^{3})
- Rifling twist: 1 in 9 in (229 mm)
- Primer type: Large rifle
- Maximum pressure (C.I.P.): 60,191 psi (415.00 MPa)
- Maximum pressure (SAAMI): 60,000 psi (410 MPa)

Ballistic performance
| Bullet mass/type | Velocity | Energy |
|---|---|---|
| 120 gr (7.8 g) AccuTip BT | 2,890 ft/s (880 m/s) | 2,226 ft⋅lbf (3,018 J) |
| 140 gr (9.1 g) Soft Point | 2,750 ft/s (840 m/s) | 2,351 ft⋅lbf (3,188 J) |

The .260 Remington (also known as 6.5-08 A-Square) cartridge was introduced by Remington in 1997. Many wildcat cartridges based on the .308 Winchester case had existed for years before Remington standardized this round.

Because 6.5 mm (.264") bullets have relatively high ballistic coefficients, the .260 Remington has seen success in rifle competition including bench rest, metallic silhouette, and long range. It is capable of duplicating the trajectory of the .300 Winchester Magnum, while generating significantly lower recoil. Also, converting a rifle chambered for the .308 Winchester (or any of its offspring, such as the .243 Winchester, 7mm-08 Remington, .358 Winchester or .338 Federal) to .260 Remington generally requires little more than a simple barrel change.

== Origin and history ==
Remington has had a track record of adopting successful wildcat cartridges into the Remington fold by offering rifles and ammunition and at times attaching their name to the cartridge. Like many cartridges such as the .22–250 Remington, .25-06 Remington, and 7 mm-08 Remington, the .260 Remington started its life as a wildcat cartridge called the 6.5-08, and was eventually released as a commercial cartridge by Remington. However, Remington was not the first to attempt to standardize the cartridge. LTC Arthur Alphin and his company A-Square LLC submitted the first proposal and drawings to SAAMI for the standardization of the cartridge. Remington filed similar papers with SAAMI to do the same a few months later. When the dust settled, the 6.5-08 would be called the .260 Remington instead of 6.5–08 A-Square.

The 6.5-08 cartridge was created simply by necking down the .308 Winchester. Handloaders and wildcatters can easily form .260 cases by necking down the 7mm-08 Remington or necking up the .243 Winchester (both based on the same .308 case). Since the parent cartridges were readily available for low cost, the 6.5-08 was often an economical alternative to cartridges such as the 6.5×55mm. What the 6.5-08 provided over the .243 Winchester, .308 Winchester, and to a lesser degree the 7mm-08 Remington was bullets with excellent ballistic coefficients and sectional densities.

Since the 6.5-08 was a wildcat cartridge, variations existed between cartridge chambers depending on the reamer used to cut the chamber. Furthermore, depending on whether one chose to form the case from .243 Winchester or .308 Winchester influenced the neck thickness and therefore the dimensions of the cartridge. A cartridge formed for a specific rifle may or may not successfully chamber or worse may reach dangerous pressures in another. Standardizing the cartridge addressed the issues owners experienced when it was a wildcat.

.264 (6.5 mm) caliber has historically been commercially unsuccessful in North America but has been one of the mainstays in Europe especially in the Scandinavian countries. The 6.5×54mm Mannlicher–Schönauer, 6.5×55mm, 6.5×57 Mauser, and 6.5-284 Norma have loyal followings in Europe. Starting with the .264 Winchester Magnum and later the 6.5mm Remington Magnum, North American cartridges in this caliber have been largely failures. The .260 Remington appeared to be following this North American trend, with Remington only producing the Model Seven Synthetic in the .260 Remington for 2011 as it has discontinued such rifles as the Model 700 CDL and the Model Seven (including the youth model) in .260. However, Remington continues to manufacture several types of .260 Remington loads. The use of the .260 Remington by Sgt Sherri Gallagher to win the 2010 NRA High Power National Championship has sparked a resurgence in the round, and Lapua announced at the 2011 SHOT show that it would be manufacturing .260 Remington brass.

== Design and specifications ==
The .260 Remington uses the .308 Winchester case as its parent cartridge which is simply necked down to accept a .264 caliber bullet with no further changes made to the case. As the cartridge follows a modern design, it has little taper which allowed its parent cartridge to feed reliably through auto-loading rifles such as the M14, FN FAL and the H&K G3. The .260 Remington has a case capacity of about 3.47 mL (53.5 gr H_{2}O).

Both SAAMI and C.I.P. have provided design specifications for the .260 Remington cartridge. While there are minor dimensional differences between dimensions provided by both organizations, these dimensional differences mostly fall within the tolerances allowed by the other organization, though C.I.P. lists the .260 as a Delta L problem cartridge. SAAMI dimensions for the cartridge were issued on January 29, 1999, when the Remington's submission was accepted.

=== SAAMI specifications ===
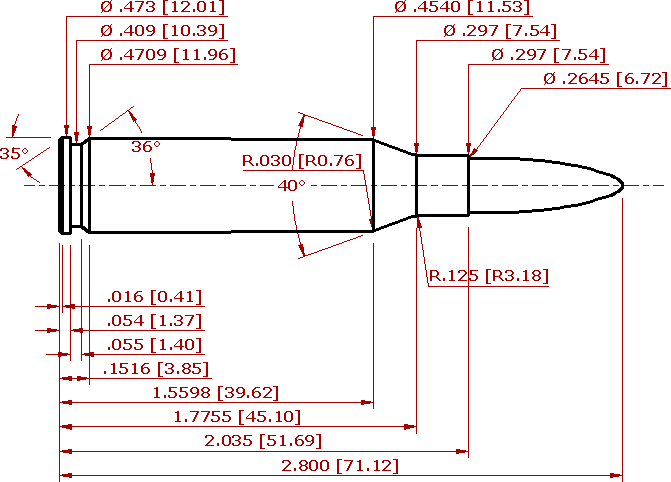
.260 Remington schematic complying with SAAMI specifications. All dimensions are in inches [millimeters].

SAAMI recommends a barrel with a 6 groove contour and a twist rate of one revolution every 9 in (229 mm) with each groove having a width of .095 in (2.41 mm). The recommended bore diameter is .256 in (6.50 mm) and the groove diameter is .264 in (6.71 mm). SAAMI recommends that rifling commence at .221 in (5.61 mm) from the chamber mouth. SAAMI also recommends a pressure of 60,000 psi (413.69 MPa)

=== C.I.P. specifications ===
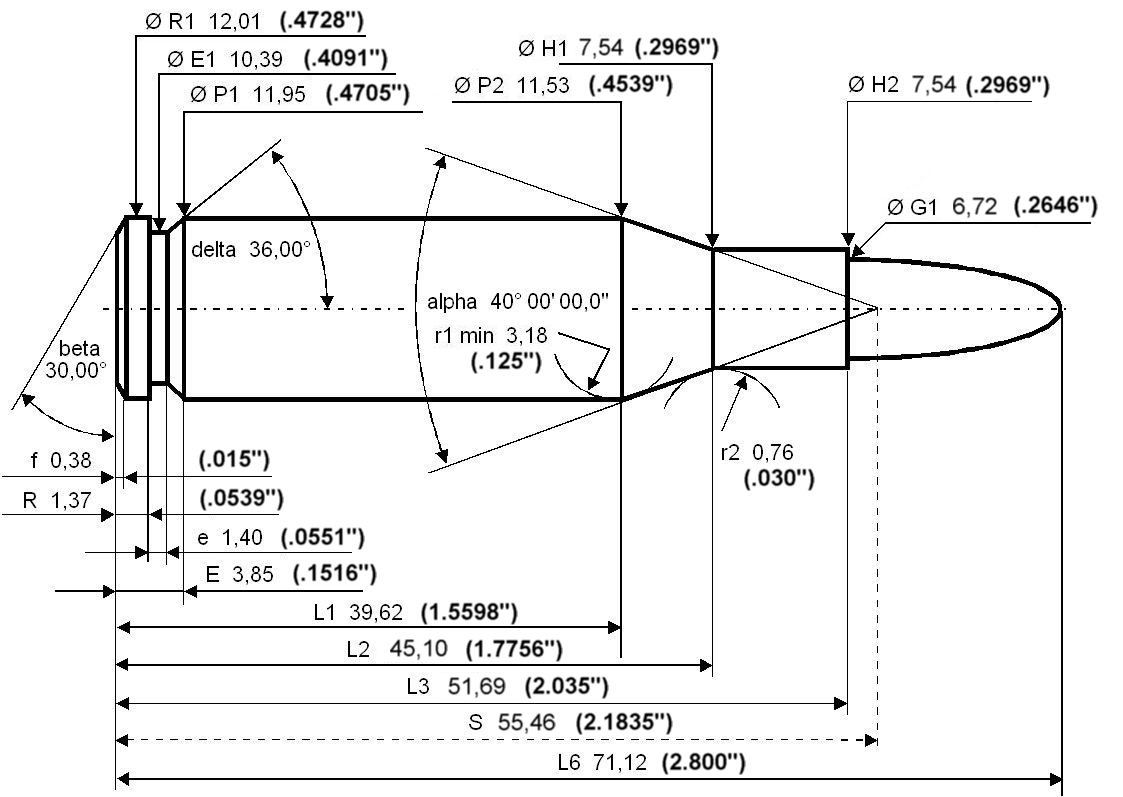

.260 Remington maximum C.I.P. cartridge dimensions. All sizes in millimeters (mm) plus Imperial (inches).

Americans would define the shoulder angle at alpha/2 = 20 degrees. The common rifling twist rate for this cartridge is 229 mm (1 in 9 in), 6 grooves, Ø lands = 6.50 mm (0.256 in), Ø grooves = 6.71 mm (0.264 in), land width = 2.42 mm (0.095 in) and the primer type is large rifle.

According to the official C.I.P. (Commission Internationale Permanente pour l'Epreuve des Armes à Feu Portatives) rulings, the .260 Remington case can handle up to 415 MPa (60,191 psi) piezo pressure. In C.I.P. regulated countries every rifle cartridge combo has to be proofed at 125% of this maximum C.I.P. pressure to certify for sale to consumers.

== Performance ==
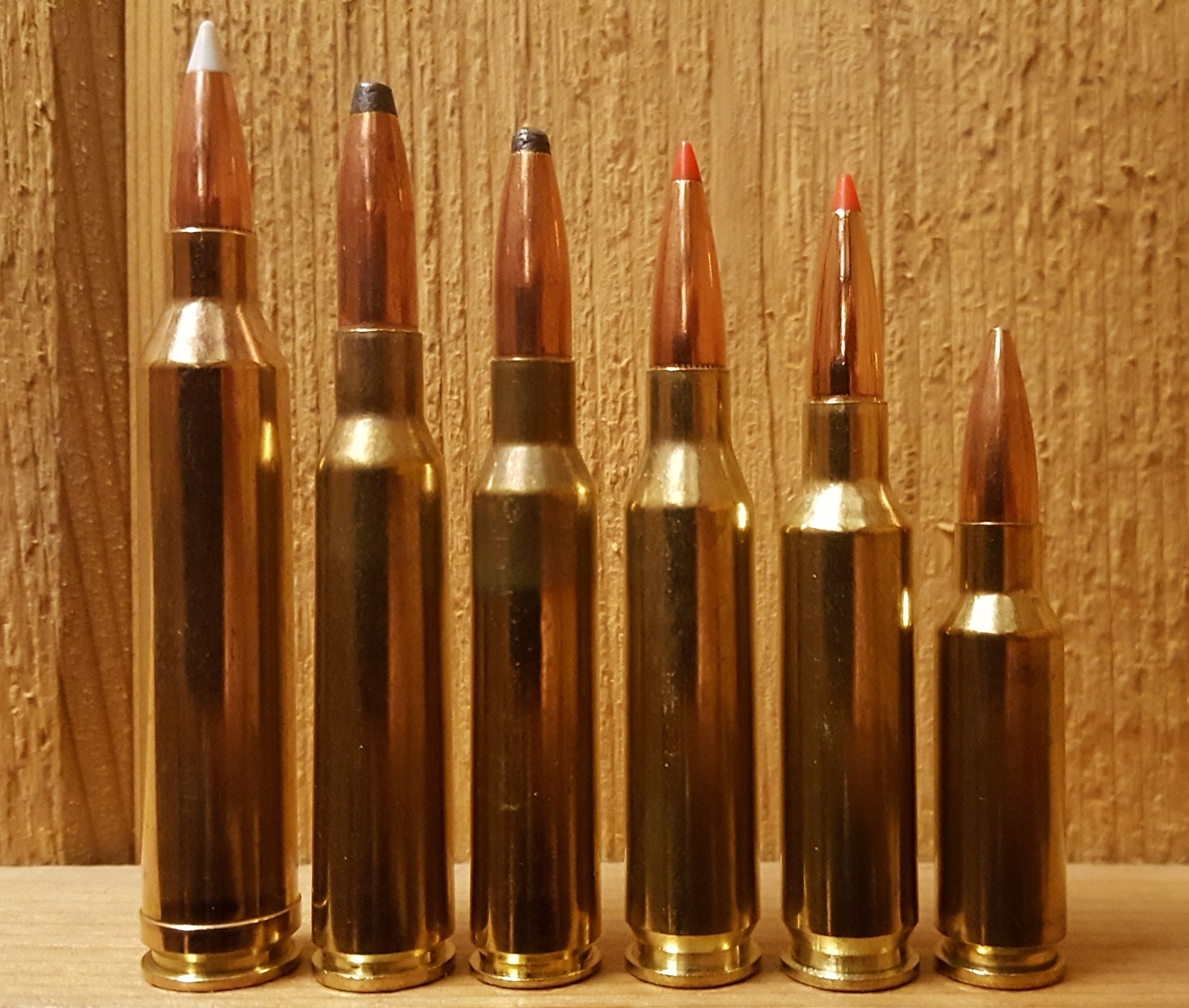
Size comparison of some 6.5 mm cartridges, left to right: .264 Winchester Magnum, 6.5×55mm Swedish, 6.5×52mm Carcano, .260 Remington, 6.5mm Creedmoor, 6.5mm Grendel

The .260 Remington being a .264 caliber (6.5 mm) has certain advantages: the bullets have good sectional density (penetrating ability) and a good selection of bullet weights. Factory ammunition usually are loaded with bullets weighing anywhere from 120 gr (7.8 g) to 140 gr (9.1 g). Bullets available to the reloader range from 85 gr (5.5 g) to 160 gr (10 g). The 120 gr (7.8 g) bullet has a sectional density of 0.246 which is similar to a 165 gr (10.7 g) .308 caliber (7.62 mm) bullet. The 140 gr (9.1 g) bullet has a sectional density of 0.287 which is similar to that of a 190 gr (12 g) .308 caliber (7.62 mm) bullet. The 160 gr (10 g) bullet which has a sectional density of 0.328 is similar in sectional density to a 220 gr (14 g) .308 caliber (7.62 mm) bullet. As sectional density plays a large factor in penetration, the .264 caliber (6.5 mm), though a diminutive caliber from a North American point of view, has had excellent results in the field. Walter D.M. Bell, who was known to have shot over a thousand elephants in his lifetime, used, among others, .264 caliber (6.5 mm) and .284 caliber (7 mm) rifles to do so.

The .260 Remington, while having a slightly lesser case capacity than the 6.5×55mm, is loaded to higher pressure levels. The opposite is true when comparing the .260 Remington to the 6.5mm Creedmoor: They are nearly-identical but the Creedmoor can take a higher chamber pressure than the .260 Remington, leading the Creedmoor to have more room for a longer bullet (more aerodynamically efficient, higher sectional density than most shorter bullets) in a given magazine length or cartridge overall length than the .260 Remington's maximum projectile length or ogive length, and yet the .260 Remington only has a similar muzzle velocities as the 6.5 Creedmoor for a given projectile weight, despite the .260 Remington's larger case capacity and longer brass casing. However, for the same reasons (higher chamber pressure than the 6.5x55 Swede and shorter brass casing), the .260 Remington outperforms the 6.5x55 Swede. Typically, the .260 Remington is loaded with a 120 gr (7.8 g) bullet at 2,890 ft/s (880 m/s) and the 140 gr (9.1 g) bullet at 2,750 ft/s (840 m/s). In contrast, Norma of Sweden loads the 6.5×55mm with a 120 gr (7.8 g) bullet at 2,822 ft/s (860 m/s) and the 140 gr (9.1 g) bullet at 2,690 ft/s (820 m/s).

While it is possible to load the 160 gr (10 g) bullet which is popular in Northern Europe, for the .260 Remington, due to the comparatively short overall length of the cartridge, the bullet will need to be seated deep into the body of the cartridge, displacing space which could be taken up by the propellant. For this reason, bullets weighing over 140 gr (9.1 g) are not generally recommended for loading with this cartridge.

== Sporting usage ==
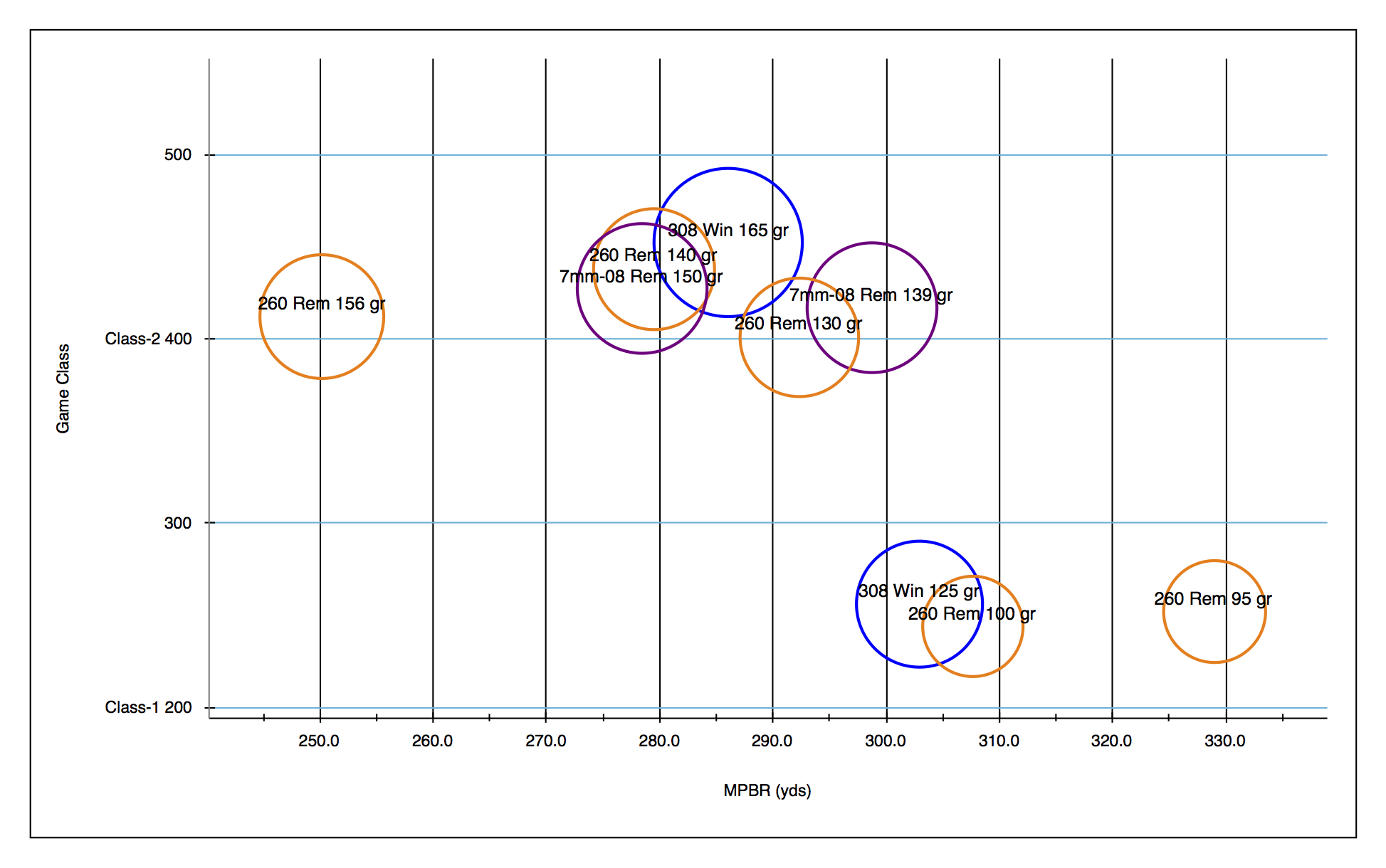
Game Class vs 6 inch Maximum Point Blank Range (circle size proportional to recoil).

Due in large part to its parentage, the .260 Remington has been adopted into tactical and target shooting rifles. Any rifle which is chambered for 7.62×51mm NATO or .308 Winchester can be converted with only the addition of an appropriate barrel to the .260 Remington. Companies such as Lewis Machine & Tool (LMT), ArmaLite, LaRue, and DPMS Panther Arms are among several companies which currently manufacture tactical rifles for use with this cartridge. The 6.5 mm (.264 caliber) bullets have favorable ballistic coefficients and have been adopted for target shooting, especially in the Scandinavian nations. Tubbs manufactures rifles for competition one of which went on to win the NRA HP Championship in 2010.

The .260 Remington has become popular with metallic silhouette shooters. The 2014 NRA National Championship equipment survey lists the .260 Remington as most popular caliber for both the high power rifle and high power hunting rifle competition.

The .260 Remington is effective on antelope, sheep, goat, or caribou, while its performance is similar to the 6.5×55mm, which is widely used on moose in Sweden and Finland. While capable of taking Class 3 game such as elk and moose, some hunters, particularly Canadian professional hunters who hunt large moose and elk, consider it slightly underpowered for these species and best used for smaller deer species such as white-tail and mule deer. The 6.5×55mm, which is usually loaded to a lower power level than the .260 Remington, is commonly used in Norway and Sweden with bullets weighing at least 9 g (140 gr) to kill Eurasian elk (a term which is applied to moose in these countries). The .260 Remington would make an excellent cartridge for hunting Class 2 species such as the smaller African antelope weighing 440 lb (200 kg) or less.

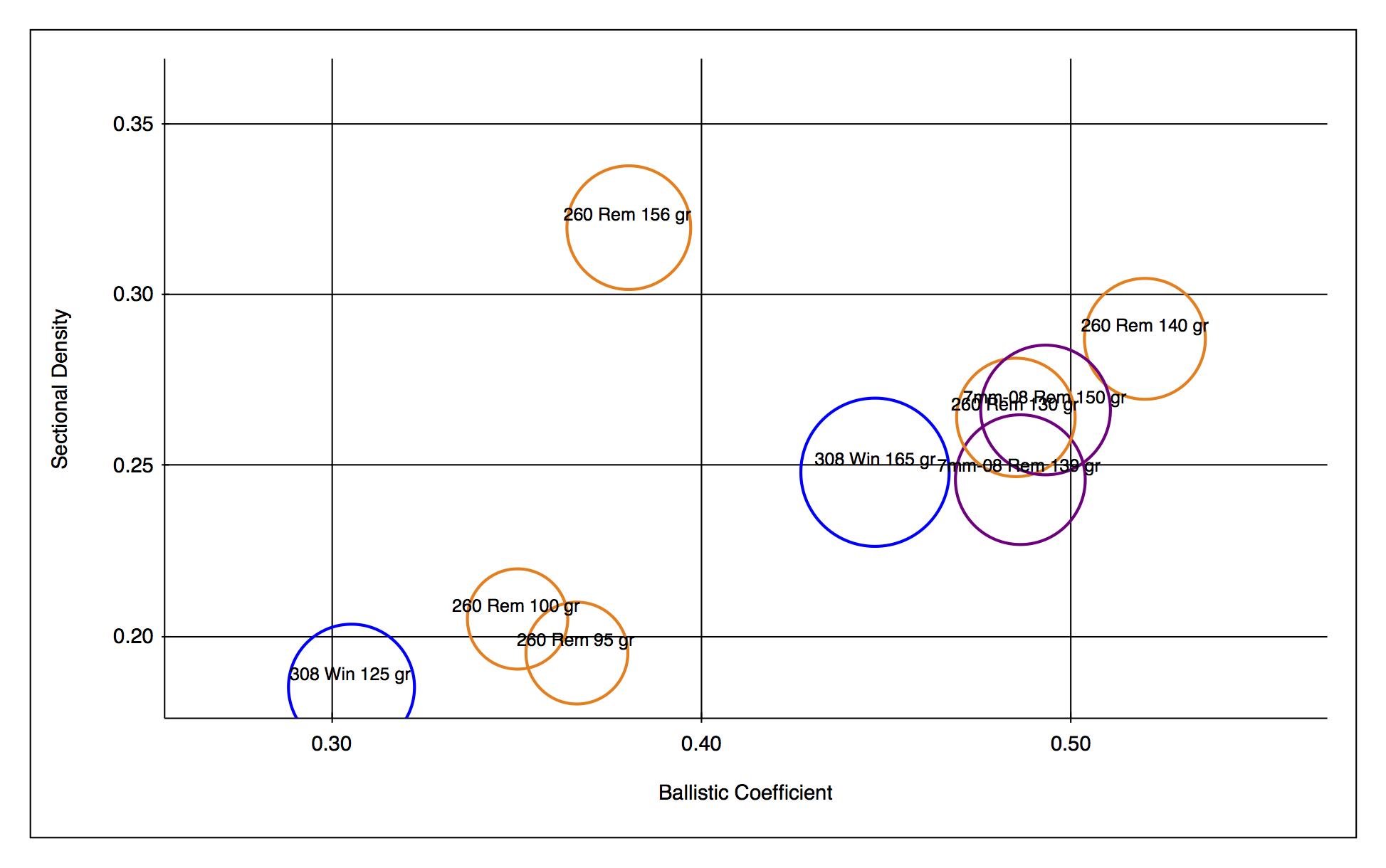
Sectional Density vs Ballistic Coefficient.

Loaded with lighter bullets, the .260 Remington can be used as an effective varmint or a small predator hunting cartridge for use against such species as marmots, woodchucks, bobcats and coyotes. Bullets chosen for these species should be designed to open rapidly unless harvesting of the pelt is the objective. FMJ or other non-expanding bullets can be used if the latter is the case.

The .260 Remington, loaded with very low drag bullets such as the 138 gr (8.9 g) Lapua, 140 gr (9.1 g) Berger, or 142 gr (9.2 g) Sierra, can match the 1,000 yd (910 m) performance of the 190 gr (12 g) Sierra-loaded .300 Winchester Magnum, with better resistance to wind deflection and half the recoil. With a 120 gr (7.8 g) boattail, energy remaining at 400 yd (370 m) is comparable to a 180 gr (12 g) in .308 Winchester, while generating only about three-quarters the recoil.

== Rifles and ammunition ==
When the .260 Remington was introduced, Remington chambered the cartridge in both the Model 700 (BDL and CDL) and the Model Seven (CDL and Youth) rifles. Remington also offered the cartridge in a Law Enforcement (LE) only model of the Model 700 rifle. While Remington has discontinued the chambering of the .260 Remington in these models, the Remington Custom Shop continues to produce rifles chambered for the cartridge.

Browning at one time chambered the cartridge in their copy of the Winchester 1885 Low Wall rifle and also their A-Bolt Micro Hunter rifle. Browning has since discontinued the .260 Remington chambering in these models.

Savage Arms continues to manufacture several rifles chambered for the .260 Remington. Currently they offer the Hunter Series 11 FCNS, Weather Warrior Series 16 FCSS, and the Target Series Model 12 Long Range Precision rifle. Savage also chambers the cartridge in more specialized rifles such as the Model 10 Predator Hunter Max 1, Model 11 Lightweight Hunter and the Model 11 Long Range Hunter.

Lewis Machine & Tool offers 260 Remington Barrels for the MWS series of rifles which allow the operator to quickly change barrel from several different calibers.

Tikka offers multiple variants of its T3 series of rifles chambered in .260 Remington.

The SAKO TRG 22 competition and sniper rifle is available in .260 Remington.

LaRue has released their PredatOBR (AR-10 style rifle) chambered in .260 as well.

260 Remington barrels are available from Wilson Combat for use in AR-10 builds.

.260 Remington Factory Ammunition
| Ammunition | Bullet | Muzzle Velocity | Muzzle Energy | MPBR/Zero | Status |
| COR-BON DPX260120-20 | 120 gr (7.8 g) DPX Hunter | 2,900 ft/s (880 m/s) | 2,241 ft⋅lbf (3,038 J) | 281 yd (257 m)/239 yd (219 m) | Discontinued 2010 |
| COR-BON DPX260120T-20 | 120 gr (7.8 g) DPX Hunter Tip | 2,900 ft/s (880 m/s) | 2,241 ft⋅lbf (3,038 J) | 285 yd (261 m)/242 yd (221 m) | Current production |
| Federal P260A | 140 gr (9.1 g) GameKing | 2,700 ft/s (820 m/s) | 2,266 ft⋅lbf (3,072 J) | 270 yd (250 m)/229 yd (209 m) | Current production |
| Federal P260B | 120 gr (7.8 g) Nosler BT | 2,950 ft/s (900 m/s) | 2,319 ft⋅lbf (3,144 J) | 291 yd (266 m)/247 yd (226 m) | Current production |
| Federal P260C | 120 gr (7.8 g) Barnes TSX | 2,930 ft/s (890 m/s) | 2,287 ft⋅lbf (3,101 J) | 283 yd (259 m)/247 yd (226 m) | Current production |
| Remington PRA260RA | 120 gr (7.8 g) Accu-Tip | 2,890 ft/s (880 m/s) | 2,225 ft⋅lbf (3,017 J) | 287 yd (262 m)/243 yd (222 m) | Current production |
| Remington R260R1 | 140 gr (9.1 g) Express | 2,750 ft/s (840 m/s) | 2,351 ft⋅lbf (3,188 J) | 271 yd (248 m)/230 yd (210 m) | Current production |
| Remington PRC260RB | 140 gr (9.1 g) Core-Lokt | 2,750 ft/s (840 m/s) | 2,351 ft⋅lbf (3,188 J) | 273 yd (250 m)/231 yd (211 m) | Current production |
| Remington RL2601 | 140 gr (9.1 g) Managed Recoil | 2,360 ft/s (720 m/s) | 1,731 ft⋅lbf (2,347 J) | 236 yd (216 m)/200 yd (180 m) | Current production |
Values courtesy of the respective manufacturer. Corrected for altitude of 1000 feet at 59 F. MPBR/Zero values courtesy of Big Game Info.

== Controversy ==
The cartridge that is now popularly known as the .260 Remington was submitted for standardization under SAAMI by the A-Square Company in 1996, several months prior to Remington announcing their plans to introduce the cartridge under their own name. A-Square's submission was called the 6.5-08 A-Square. Some users continue to refer to the cartridge under this name.

Since the acceptance of the submission by Remington Arms for the standardization of the 6.5-08 cartridge by SAAMI, A-Square has dropped the cartridge from their line of cartridges chambered for their rifles and no longer offers ammunition in this cartridge. Instead A-Square LLC has gone on to produce rifles and ammunition for the 6.5-06 A-Square cartridge which is based on the .30-06 Springfield necked down to .264 caliber (6.5 mm). This cartridge provides over a 200 ft/s (61 m/s) velocity advantage over the .260 Remington.

== See also ==
- List of firearms
- 6mm caliber
- 6.5mm Creedmoor
- Table of handgun and rifle cartridges
- Delta L problem
- Sectional density
