= .25-06 Remington =

US hunting rifle cartridge

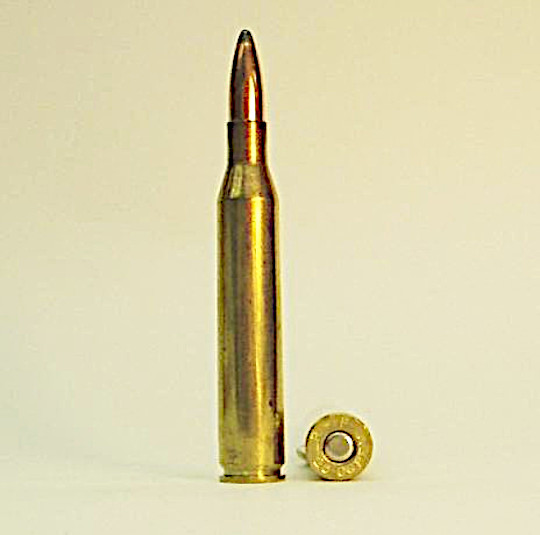
- .25-06 Remington cartridge
- Type: Rifle, Hunting
- Place of origin: United States

Production history
- Designer: Remington Arms Company
- Designed: 1969
- Manufacturer: Remington
- Produced: 1969–present

Specifications
- Parent case: .30-06
- Case type: Rimless, bottleneck
- Bullet diameter: .257 in (6.5 mm)
- Neck diameter: .290 in (7.4 mm)
- Shoulder diameter: .441 in (11.2 mm)
- Base diameter: .470 in (11.9 mm)
- Rim diameter: .473 in (12.0 mm)
- Rim thickness: .05 in (1.3 mm)
- Case length: 2.494 in (63.3 mm)
- Overall length: 3.250 in (82.6 mm)
- Case capacity: 65.8 gr H_{2}O (4.26 cm^{3})
- Rifling twist: 1 in 10 in (250 mm)
- Primer type: Large rifle
- Maximum pressure: 63,000 psi (430 MPa)

Ballistic performance
Bullet mass/type	Velocity	Energy
100 gr (6 g) PSP-CL	3,230 ft/s (980 m/s)	2,316 ft⋅lbf (3,140 J)
115 gr (7 g) PSP-CL Ultra	3,000 ft/s (910 m/s)	2,298 ft⋅lbf (3,116 J)
120 gr (8 g) PSP-CL	2,990 ft/s (910 m/s)	2,382 ft⋅lbf (3,230 J)
- Test barrel length: 24"; Source(s): Remington Arms

The .25-06 Remington was a wildcat cartridge for nearly half a century before finally being standardized by Remington in 1969.

Its design was based on the .30-06 Springfield cartridge necked-down (case opening made narrower) to .257 caliber keeping a similar cartridge length of its parent case, thus being chambered in standard-length actions. Nominal bullet diameter is 0.257 in, and bullet weights range from 75 to 120 grains (4.9 to 7.8 g).

== History ==
Charles Newton necked down the .30-06 Springfield cartridge in 1912 to accept a 117-grain .25-35 Winchester bullet, but the resulting .256 Newton cartridge did not catch on. Newton's early modification encouraged commercial release of a shortened case (from 63 to 49 mm) as the .250-3000 Savage in 1915. Frankford Arsenal developed an experimental .25-06 during World War I; and distribution of surplus United States military equipment through the Civilian Marksmanship Program following the war encouraged independent gunsmiths to experiment with the cartridge. A. O. Niedner of Dowagiac, Michigan, introduced rifles for the .25 Niedner in 1920. Niedner Arms Corporation retained the 17° 30′ .30-06 shoulder chambering .25 caliber barrels rifled with one twist in 12 inches (300 mm). Similar cartridges were identified as the .25 Hi-Power, .25 Whelen (analogous to .35 Whelen), or .25-100-3000 (to indicate the ability to achieve 3,000 feet-per-second with a 100-grain bullet rather than the 87-grain bullet used in the .250-3000 Savage). Greater case capacity offered minimal velocity improvement over the .250-3000 Savage case with contemporary smokeless powders. Availability of DuPont's Improved Military Rifle (IMR) powders encouraged commercial release of the .257 Roberts using the 57 mm Mauser case in 1934. Release of IMR 4350 in 1940 and availability of surplus 4831 powder salvaged from Oerlikon 20 mm cannon cartridges after World War II greatly improved performance of the full-length .25-06 case.

== Performance ==
Most .25-caliber bullets have high ballistic coefficients without being heavy, which, combined with the large case capacity of its parent .30-06 case, allows relatively high muzzle velocities without heavy recoil. The combination of high ballistic coefficients with high muzzle velocities gives the .25-06 a very flat trajectory as well as retaining kinetic energy down-range.

The cartridge is capable of propelling a 117 grain (7.6 g) bullet at up to 3,200 feet per second (980 m/s) and energy levels up to 2,500 ft⋅lbf (3,400 J). Bullets lighter than 75 grains are available in .257 caliber but were designed for the smaller .25-20 Winchester and .25-35 Winchester cartridges and are too lightly constructed for the high velocities of the .25-06.

The cartridge has less felt recoil than a .30-06 in a similar-weight rifle, due to the lighter-weight bullets used. Shooters who are recoil sensitive will find the recoil from the .25-06 easier on the shoulder, contributing to good shot placement. This cartridge is not quite as powerful as the .257 Weatherby Magnum, usually running 200–300 ft/s (61–91 m/s) slower with a given bullet weight, but almost 200 ft/s faster than the .257 Roberts at its hottest loads (i.e. .257 Roberts +P).

SAAMI pressure limit for the .25-06 is 63,000 PSI.

== Sporting uses ==
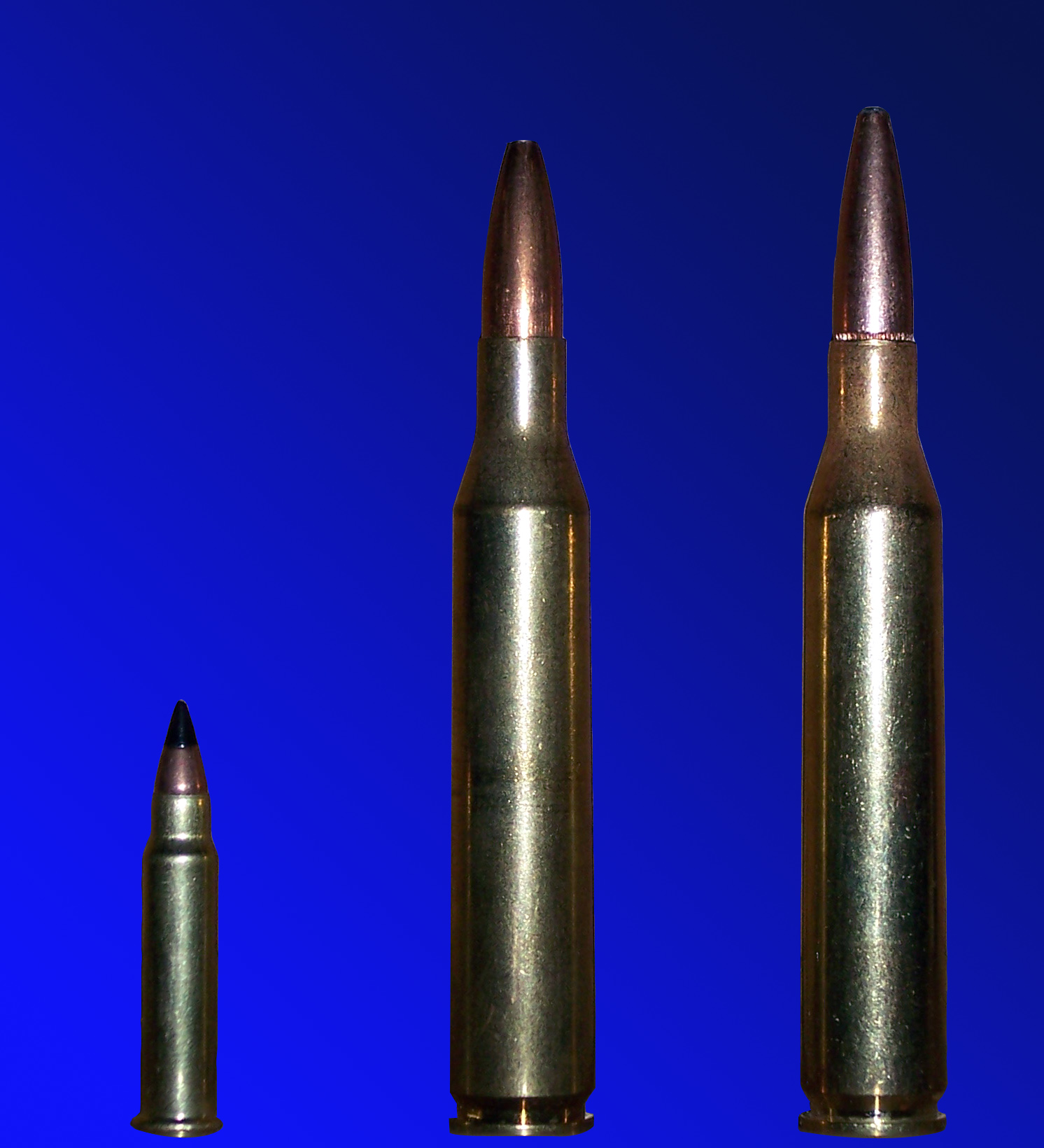
Left: .17 HMR, center and right: .25-06 Remington

The .25-06 is generally considered to be a good round for medium-sized game such as deer and antelope because of its combination of substantial kinetic energy and moderate recoil. The addition of a flat trajectory makes it particularly popular in open terrains such as plains and mountains, where longer-range shots on game are not seldom, since its flat trajectory forgives range-estimation errors up to 300 yards if sighted to its maximum point blank range.

Bullets of different weights and construction make the .25-06 Remington a fine alternative for hunting species ranging from prairie dogs and coyotes to mid-sized deer and sheep. Although capable of taking heavier game such as elk, many hunters prefer a larger caliber and a heavier bullet for larger species.

Bullets range from lightly constructed 75-grain bullets with muzzle velocities in the 3,700 ft/s (1,130 m/s) range to more robust 120-grain bullets with muzzle velocities in the 3,000 ft/s (915 m/s) range. Most manufacturers of bolt-action or single-shot rifles offer the .25-06 as a standard chambering and factory loaded ammunition is available from Remington, Winchester, Federal Cartridge and most other major manufacturers.

== See also ==
- List of rifle cartridges
- Table of handgun and rifle cartridges
- .250-3000 Savage
- .25 WSSM
- .257 Roberts
- .257 Weatherby Magnum
- .30-06 Springfield wildcat cartridges
- 6 mm caliber
- Delta L problem
- Sectional density
