= 7.62mm Thumper =

Gun barrel specification

7.62mm Thumper is a barrel specification optimized to run larger bullets out of standard 7.62×39mm cases. Barrels are cut to a standard 7.62×39mm "Russian" chamber but the bore ideally uses a faster 1:8" rifling twist rate in order to stabilize bullets heavier than 200gr at subsonic speeds. (Standard 1/10" twist barrels seem to be adequate for bullets up to 220gr.) Bores are also cut to .308" instead of the wider .311" diameter standard for 7.62×39mm, which allows reloaders to accurately employ the much more common and diverse .308 bullets, which are widely available in weights up to 240gr.

The problem with .311 bores is that they do not shoot .308 bullets accurately. .311 bullets are typically only found in weights up to 180gr, which is more difficult to run at subsonic speeds in the 7.62×39mm case.

The largest advantage of the 7.62mm Thumper is that the underlying case is common and, unlike most subsonic rifle cartridges, does not require modifications for subsonic loadings. Also, when loaded with heavier bullets it employs enough propellant to reliably cycle gas-operated semiautomatic firearms designed for the 7.62×39mm.
