= 6.5×58mm Vergueiro =

Portuguese rifle cartridge

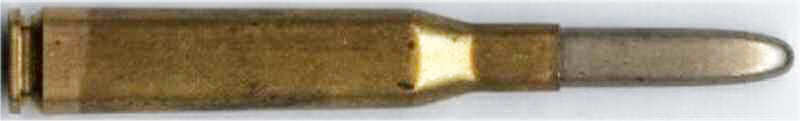
- Type: Rifle
- Place of origin: Portugal

Service history
- In service: 1904–1939
- Used by: Portugal; Union of South Africa
- Wars: World War I

Production history
- Designer: José Alberto Vergueiro
- Designed: 1904

Specifications
- Case type: Rimless, bottleneck
- Bullet diameter: 6.65 mm (0.262 in)
- Neck diameter: 7.56 mm (0.298 in)
- Shoulder diameter: 10.94 mm (0.431 in)
- Base diameter: 11.88 mm (0.468 in)
- Rim diameter: 11.78 mm (0.464 in)
- Rim thickness: 1.32 mm (0.052 in)
- Case length: 57.85 mm (2.278 in)
- Overall length: 81.50 mm (3.209 in)

Ballistic performance
Bullet mass/type	Velocity	Energy
155 gr (10 g) FMJ	2,347 ft/s (715 m/s)	2,000 ft⋅lbf (2,700 J)
- Source(s): Rifles and Machine Guns MUNICIOC.org

The 6.5×58mm Vergueiro is a centerfire rimless cartridge designed in 1904 specifically for the Mauser-Vergueiro, chosen as service rifle of the Portuguese Army. It was adopted to replace the rimmed 8×60mmR Guedes and 8×56mmR Kropatschek Corto cartridges originally filled with blackpowder, which had been used with Kropatschek rifles procured in the mid-1880s. Smokeless powder allowed for a higher velocity round and further calibre reduction to 6.5 mm, a step already taken by other European countries, e.g. Sweden (6.5×55mm Swedish) and Italy (6.5×52mm Carcano).

It remained the service rifle cartridge until the Karabiner 98k replaced the Mauser-Vergueiro pattern in 1939. The round was also used for sporting purposes, manufacturers like DWM and Kynoch offered it until the 1960s.

In military use the common projectile weighs 155 grains and travels at up to 2,400 feet (730 meters) per second. A lot of the Mauser-Vergueiro rifles were later rechambered to accept the standard 7.92×57mm cartridge of the newer Mauser 98k pattern.

== See also ==
- 6 mm caliber
- 6.5×55mm Swedish
- 6.5×52mm Carcano
- List of rifle cartridges
- Table of handgun and rifle cartridges
