= 5.6×61mm VHSE =

Rifle cartridge

5.6×61mm SE
- Type: Rifle
- Place of origin: Nazi Germany

Production history
- Manufacturer: Only commercially available through Walter Gehmann, Karlsruhe as of 2007
- Produced: 1937

Specifications
- Parent case: 6.5×55mm Swedish
- Bullet diameter: 5.8 mm (0.23 in)
- Case length: 60.8 mm (2.39 in)
- Overall length: 80 mm (3.1 in)

The 5.6×61mm SE, an abbreviated form of its full designation, the 5.6×61mm [Vom Hofe] Super Express, is a rifle cartridge introduced in Germany in 1937. It is based on the 6.5×55mm Swedish cartridge.

The '5.6×61mm SE' uses a .228-in diameter bullet (as also does the .22 Savage Hi-Power, unlike the more common .224-in bullets used for most .22 centrefire cartridges.

5.6×61mm VHSE ammunition is still available (2007) from Walter Gehmann, Karlsruhe, Germany. No mass-produced rifles are currently offered in this chambering, but custom rifle makers will chamber for it; and the calibre has a loyal if specialised following, especially among handloading long-range hunters of roe deer and chamois, although the cartridge has accounted for very much larger deer and antelope.
