= .256 Newton =

Rifle cartridge

- Type: Hunting
- Place of origin: United States

Production history
- Designer: Charles Newton
- Designed: 1913
- Manufacturer: Western Cartridge Company

Specifications
- Parent case: .30-06 Springfield
- Case type: Rimless
- Bullet diameter: .264 in (6.7 mm)
- Neck diameter: .291 in (7.4 mm)
- Shoulder diameter: .418 in (10.6 mm); Shoulder angle: 18°
- Base diameter: .471 in (12.0 mm)
- Rim diameter: .473 in (12.0 mm)
- Rim thickness: .049 in (1.2 mm)
- Case length: 2.440 in (62.0 mm)
- Overall length: 3.40 in (86 mm)
- Rifling twist: 1 in 10 in (250 mm)
- Primer type: large rifle

Ballistic performance
Bullet mass/type	Velocity	Energy
123 gr (8 g)	3,103 ft/s (946 m/s)	2,632 ft⋅lbf (3,569 J)
140 gr (9 g)	3,000 ft/s (910 m/s)	2,800 ft⋅lbf (3,800 J)
- Sources: Newton Arms Company Catalog. 14th edition, 1920. IN Barnes, Frank C. "Cartridges of the World" Digest Books Inc., 1972.

The .256 Newton was a high-velocity, rimless centerfire cartridge based on the .30-06 Springfield military cartridge and developed in 1913 by Charles Newton in conjunction with the Western Cartridge Company. To make the .256 Newton cartridge, the .30-06 case was necked down to a caliber of .264 inches, the overall case length was shortened, body taper was increased, the neck was moved back, and the shoulder was given a sharper, 23-degree angle, as opposed to the 17-degree shoulder of the parent cartridge.

The .256 Newton suffered from a lack of available slow-burning powders capable of fully exploiting the large capacity of the parent case. Newton's company went bankrupt after the end of World War I and production of commercially loaded ammunition ceased by 1938.

After World War II, with a supply of 6.5mm rifles (.264 caliber), the availability of slower burning powders, and inexpensive, surplus .30-06 brass cases, shooters developed the 6.5mm-06 wildcat cartridge by necking down the .30-06 case to 6.5mm (.264 inches). In 1997, the A-Square company standardized the chambering as the 6.5-06 A-Square with the Sporting Arms and Ammunition Manufacturers' Institute (SAAMI). Although substantially similar, the .256 Newton is not interchangeable with the .30-06 parent cartridge, the 6.5-06 wildcat chambering, or the SAAMI standardized 6.5-06 A-Square cartridge.
