= Fire forming =

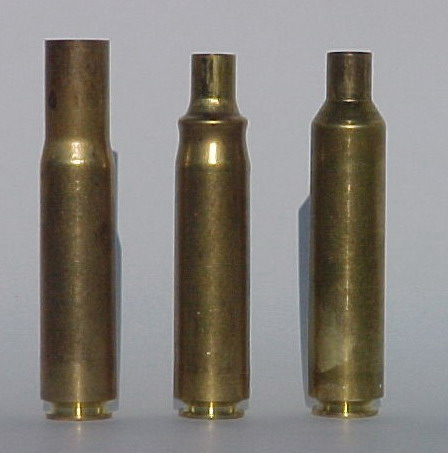
Fire formed .284 Achilles case (right), cold formed .425 Westley Richards case (center) and .425 Westley Richards parent case (left)

The term fire forming in firearms refers to the process of thermomechanically reshaping a metallic cartridge case to optimally fit a new chamber by firing it within that chamber. This might expand a cartridge to a new size, such as a wildcat cartridge, or just to the chamber of a specific gun.

Fire forming a wildcat differs from the normal manufacturing process; in that it relies on firing a loaded cartridge of differing dimensions than the chamber which it is being fired in. After fire forming, the spent case will take on the new dimensions of the firearm's chamber. Fire forming is the final process in creating a wildcat or an improved cartridge.

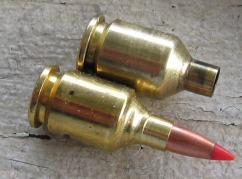

There are two methods of fire forming. One method is to cold form a parent case using forming dies, creating some form of headspace, load the case and fire the cold formed cartridge in the chamber of the firearm. This first method is the most common and will create a wildcat cartridge. The second method is to fire form a factory cartridge by using its factory headspace to headspace on. The factory cartridge is then fired in the chamber of the firearm. This second method will create an improved cartridge.

== See also ==
- Glossary of firearms terms
- Ackley Improved
- Obturation
