= .35 Whelen =

US medium-bore rifle cartridge

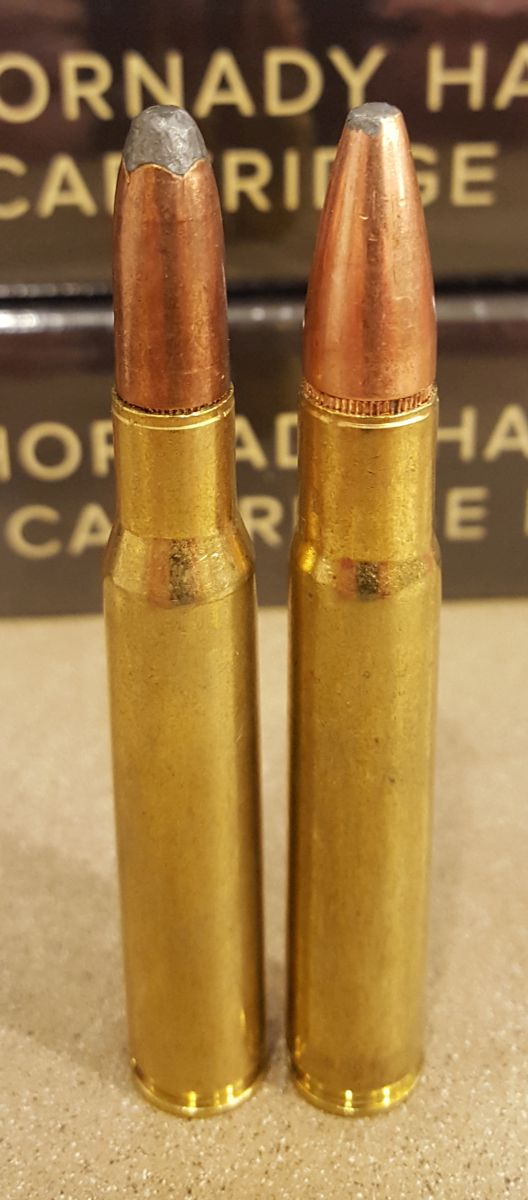
- .30-06 Springfield (left), .35 Whelen (right)
- Type: Rifle
- Place of origin: United States

Production history
- Designer: Col. Townsend Whelen; James Howe
- Designed: 1922
- Produced: 1988–present

Specifications
- Parent case: .30-06 Springfield
- Case type: Rimless, bottleneck
- Bullet diameter: .358 in (9.1 mm)
- Neck diameter: .385 in (9.8 mm)
- Shoulder diameter: .441 in (11.2 mm)
- Base diameter: .472 in (12.0 mm)
- Rim diameter: .473 in (12.0 mm)
- Case length: 2.494 in (63.3 mm)
- Overall length: 3.340 in (84.8 mm)
- Rifling twist: 1-16"
- Primer type: Large rifle
- Maximum CUP: 52,000 CUP

Ballistic performance
Bullet mass/type	Velocity	Energy
180 gr (12 g) FN	2,963 ft/s (903 m/s)	3,510 ft⋅lbf (4,760 J)
200 gr (13 g) SP	2,798 ft/s (853 m/s)	3,478 ft⋅lbf (4,716 J)
225 gr (15 g) SBT	2,613 ft/s (796 m/s)	3,412 ft⋅lbf (4,626 J)
250 gr (16 g) RN	2,523 ft/s (769 m/s)	3,535 ft⋅lbf (4,793 J)
- Test barrel length: 24 inches Source: Accurate Powder

The .35 Whelen is a powerful medium-bore rifle cartridge that does not require a magnum action or a magnum bolt-face. The parent of this cartridge is the .30-06 Springfield, which is necked-up to accept a bullet diameter of .358 in (9.1 mm). This cartridge is more powerful than its parent, especially in killing power on large game. However, with much wider availability and the higher BC (ballistic coefficient) of .30 caliber bullets of today, the power gap between the two cartridges has been decreased.

== History ==
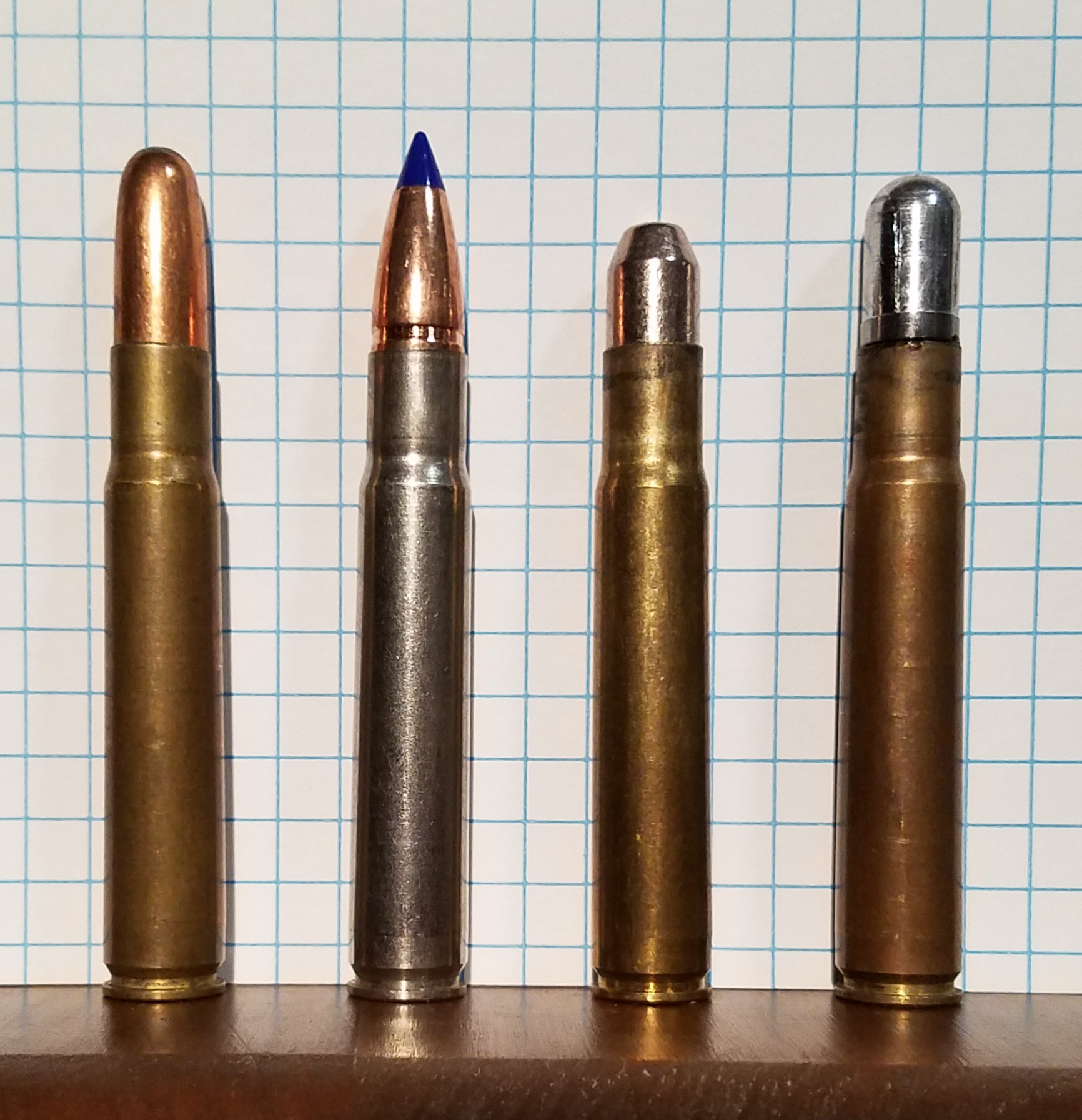
Handloading is popular among .35 Whelen owners because of the wide variety of available bullets in comparison to commercially loaded ammunition. Pictured from left to right are a 275-grain full metal jacket, a 200-grain plastic-tipped copper bullet, a 110-grain frangible revolver bullet for varmint hunting, and a 270-grain cast bullet for metallic silhouette shooting.

The .35 Whelen was developed in 1922 as a wildcat cartridge. Remington Arms Company standardized the cartridge as a regular commercial round and first made it available in the Remington model 700 Classic in 1988. It has since been chambered by other arms makers in bolt-action, semi-automatic, pump action, and single-shot rifles. It has a modest but steady following among big game hunters in North America.

One version of its origin is that it was designed by Colonel Townsend Whelen when he was commanding officer of the Frankford Arsenal. In a 1923 issue of American Rifleman Col. Whelen refers to it as "the first cartridge that I designed" and states that, "Mr. James V. Howe undertook this work of making dies, reamers, chambering tools, and of chambering the rifles, all in accordance with my design." James V. Howe was a toolmaker at the Arsenal and later a founder of Griffin & Howe.

In his 1940 book The Hunting Rifle: Design, Selection, Ballistics, Marksmanship, Col. Whelen gives a different version of its origin after describing the .400 Whelen.

About the time we completed development of this cartridge, I went on a long hunting trip in the Northwest, and when I returned, Mr. Howe showed me another cartridge he had developed. The .30-06 case was necked to .35 caliber to use existing .35-caliber bullets. Mr. Howe asked my permission to call this cartridge the .35 Whelen, but he alone deserves credit for its development.

=== .35 Whelen ===
The .35 Whelen was designed by James Howe, of Griffin and Howe, partially in response to letters from Leslie Simpson and Stewart Edward White, suggesting that a good all-round rifle for African use would be one of 333 to 350 caliber, with a bullet of 250- to 300 grains (ideally 275 at 2500 fps). Both men (along with Roy Chapman Andrews and the Rev. Dr. Harry Caldwell, who were active in Asia,) were aware of the performance of the 318 Westley-Richards with a 250-grain bullet, the 333 Jeffrey with a 300-grain bullet and the 350 Rigby with a 310-grain bullet on thin-skinned dangerous and non-dangerous game in Africa. It is of passing interest that the bullet for the old British 333 Jeffery is much like the 300-grain copper tube bullet which Winchester introduced for the 338 Magnum. The .35 Whelen was the first of three efforts by Griffin and Howe to produce a cartridge that would meet this ideal. All were in .35 caliber. The .35 Whelen is simply the 30-06 necked up to .35 caliber and it's about as easy to form from '06 brass as is the 270. Later, an "improved" version of the .35 Whelen, with venturi shoulders like Weatherby cartridges, was made up, but it never caught on. The .35 Whelen, now available in several factory rounds, and factory chambered in several different rifles has racked up a tremendous record all over the world, rivaling the 375 Holland and Holland in its effectiveness. It was originally designed, partially, as a substitute for the 375 H & H, since rifles for it could be made up using inexpensive 30-06 actions rather than costly magnum-length Mauser Actions. It has killed all of the trophy animals in the world, with the possible exception of the "Big Three" (elephant, rhinoceros, and cape buffalo.) It can be loaded down to .35 Remington speeds for light recoil and pot-shooting, or loaded up to provide stopping power--more than should ever be needed by a competent rifleman facing American big game. Although not legal in certain parts of Africa for dangerous game (some countries require that rifles of at least 375 or 400 caliber be used,) solid nose bullets are available so that, in a pinch, it would serve. It is easy to rebarrel an action to this cartridge-- it does not even require opening up the bolt face or free-boring; the rimless brass for it, as with the 358, is cheaper and easier to manufacture than the belted brass necessary for the 350 Remington, .35 Griffin and Howe (or Holland and Holland, as it is sometimes known) and 358 Norma Magnum.

== Performance ==
Suitable .358 in (9.1 mm) bullets range in weight from 150 to 300 grains (9.7 to 19.4 g). Using a 250-grain (16 g) bullet, the .35 Whelen will generate 3,500 ft⋅lbf (4,700 J) at the muzzle from a 24 in (61 cm) barrel.

The .35 Whelen is not the ballistic twin of the .350 Remington Magnum and falls about 500 foot-pounds short. With the correct bullet choice, this cartridge is suitable for virtually all thin-skinned large and dangerous game. The European designation for this cartridge would be 9x63mm; with its wide bullet selection and high muzzle energy it is in the same echelon as the 9.3×62mm.

== See also ==
- .30-06 Springfield wildcat cartridges
- .338 Winchester Magnum
- .350 Remington Magnum
- .358 Norma Magnum
- .358 Winchester
- .375 H&H Magnum
- 9.3×62mm
- 9.3×74mmR
- 9.3×64mm Brenneke
- 9 mm caliber
- List of rifle cartridges
- Table of handgun and rifle cartridges
