= .20 BR =

Rifle cartridge

- Type: Rifle
- Place of origin: US

Specifications
- Parent case: .22 BR Remington
- Case type: Rimless, bottleneck
- Bullet diameter: .204 in (5.2 mm)
- Neck diameter: .232 in (5.9 mm)
- Shoulder diameter: .459 in (11.7 mm)
- Base diameter: .470 in (11.9 mm)
- Rim diameter: .473 in (12.0 mm)
- Rim thickness: .054 in (1.4 mm)
- Case length: 1.535 in (39.0 mm)
- Primer type: small rifle

Ballistic performance
Bullet mass/type	Velocity	Energy
40 gr (3 g) V-Max	4,000 ft/s (1,200 m/s)	1,420 ft⋅lbf (1,930 J)
50 gr (3 g) VLD	3,600 ft/s (1,100 m/s)	1,440 ft⋅lbf (1,950 J)

The .20 BR is a centerfire wildcat rifle cartridge. It is based on the .22 BR Remington case necked down to accept a 5.2 millimetres (0.204 in) diameter bullet and maintaining the shoulder angle of 30° and case length of 39 millimetres (1.535 in). The cartridge features a short fat case which is reputed to be both efficient and accurate.

The large powder capacity of the case allows it to propel a 2.6 grams (40 gr) bullet at over 1,200 metres per second (4,000 ft/s), however the cartridge is considered overbore and can be expected to have a relatively short barrel life.

The inherent accuracy of the BR case design and the high performance of the .20 BR has led to it being adopted by varmint hunters and target shooters.

Advantages of this cartridge include; its ability to be chambered in any rifle action which has the .308 Winchester sized bolt face; its short length enables action makers to utilise shorter ports to increase rigidity; and cases are easily formed and loaded.

== See also ==
- .20 Tactical
- .204 Ruger
- 5 mm/35 SMc
- 5 mm caliber
- List of rifle cartridges
