= .17 Remington Fireball =

Rifle cartridge

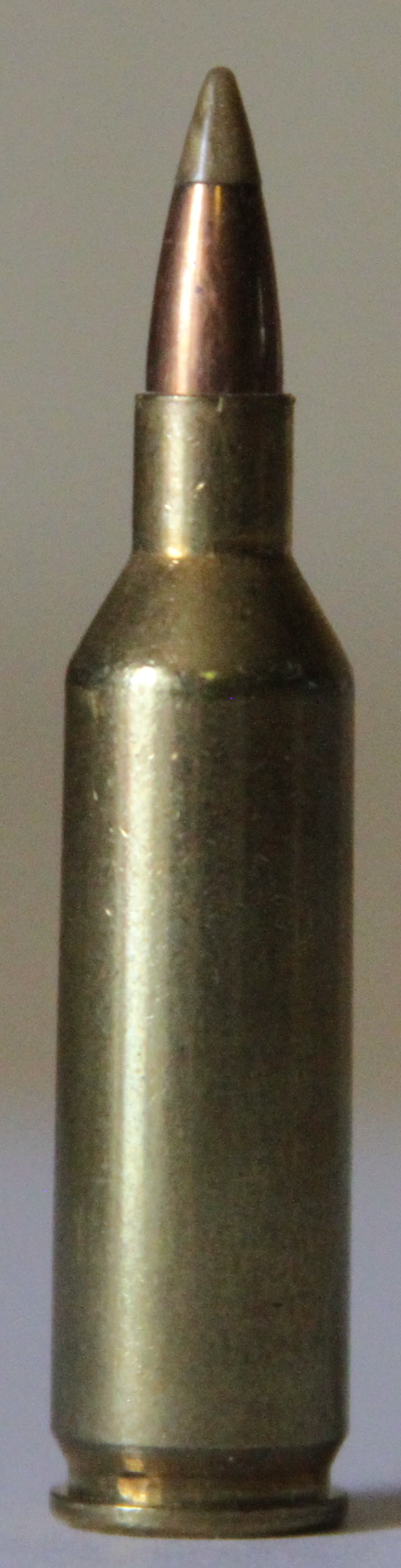
- Type: Rifle
- Place of origin: United States

Production history
- Designer: Remington
- Designed: 2006
- Manufacturer: Remington
- Produced: 2007
- Variants: see .17 Mach IV

Specifications
- Parent case: .221 Remington Fireball
- Case type: rimless bottlenecked
- Bullet diameter: .172 in (4.4 mm)
- Neck diameter: .206 in (5.2 mm)
- Shoulder diameter: .3673 in (9.33 mm)
- Base diameter: .3769 in (9.57 mm)
- Case length: 1.420 in (36.1 mm)
- Primer type: Small Rifle

Ballistic performance
Bullet mass/type	Velocity	Energy
20 gr (1 g) VMAX	4,037 ft/s (1,230 m/s)	724 ft⋅lbf (982 J)
25 gr (2 g) HP	3,789 ft/s (1,155 m/s)	797 ft⋅lbf (1,081 J)
30 gr (2 g) HP	3,569 ft/s (1,088 m/s)	849 ft⋅lbf (1,151 J)

The .17 Remington Fireball / 4.4x36mm was created in 2007 by Remington Arms Company as a response to the popular wildcat round, the .17 Mach IV. Factory loads drive a 20 grain (1.3 g) bullet around 4,000 ft/s (1,219 m/s). Velocity is close to the .17 Remington but with significantly less powder, and therefore less heat and fouling. Both are important issues to high-volume shooters such as varmint hunters.

== Overview ==
It is based on the .221 Remington Fireball necked down to accept a .17 caliber bullet and is very similar to the .17 Mach IV. Reports on this cartridge show mild recoil, high velocity, with minimal report (noise).

== Dimensions ==
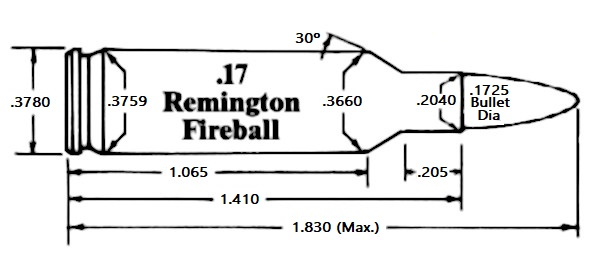

== Gallery ==
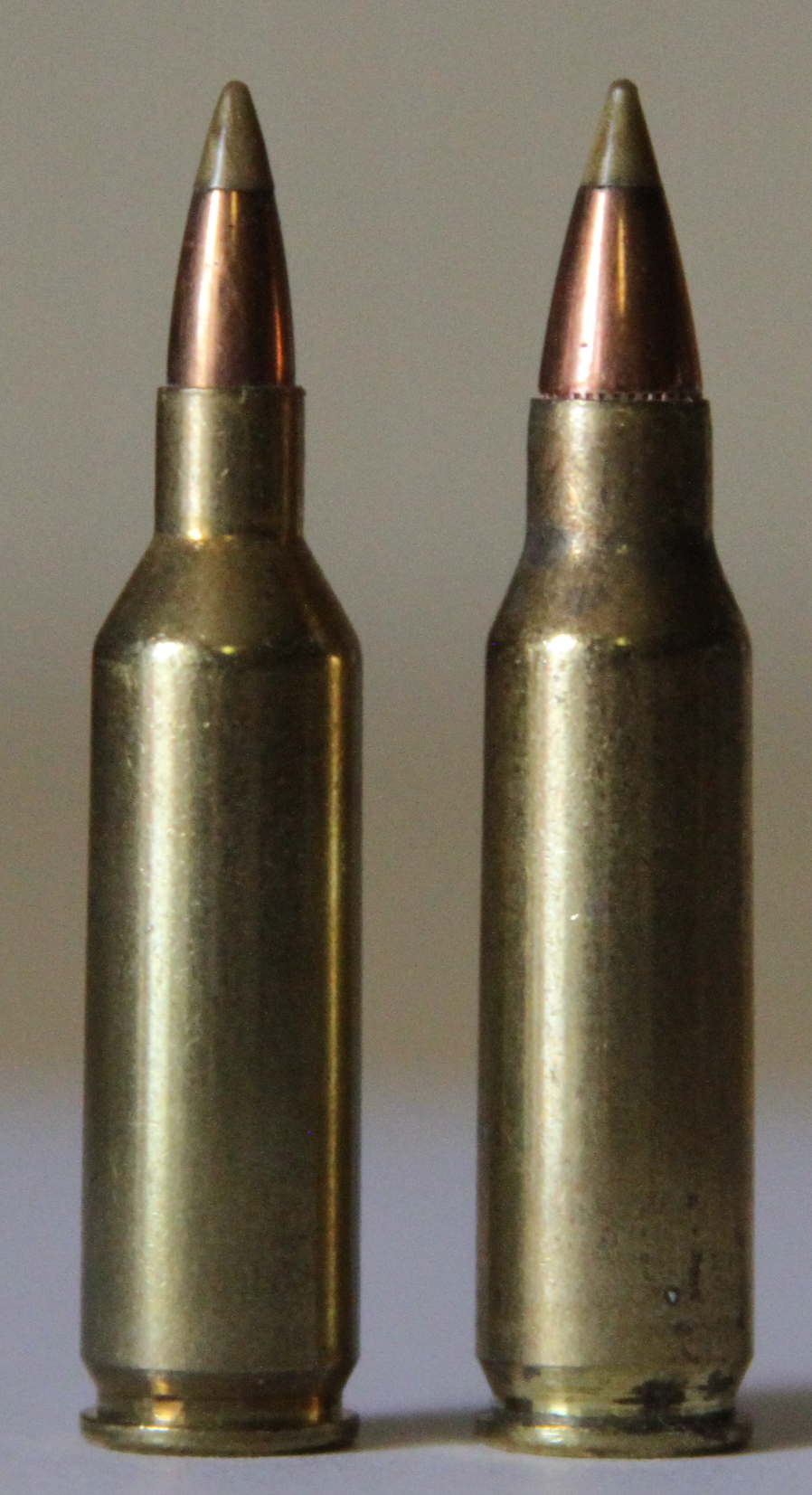
.17 Remington Fireball cartridge next to a .221 Remington Fireball cartridge, its parent case

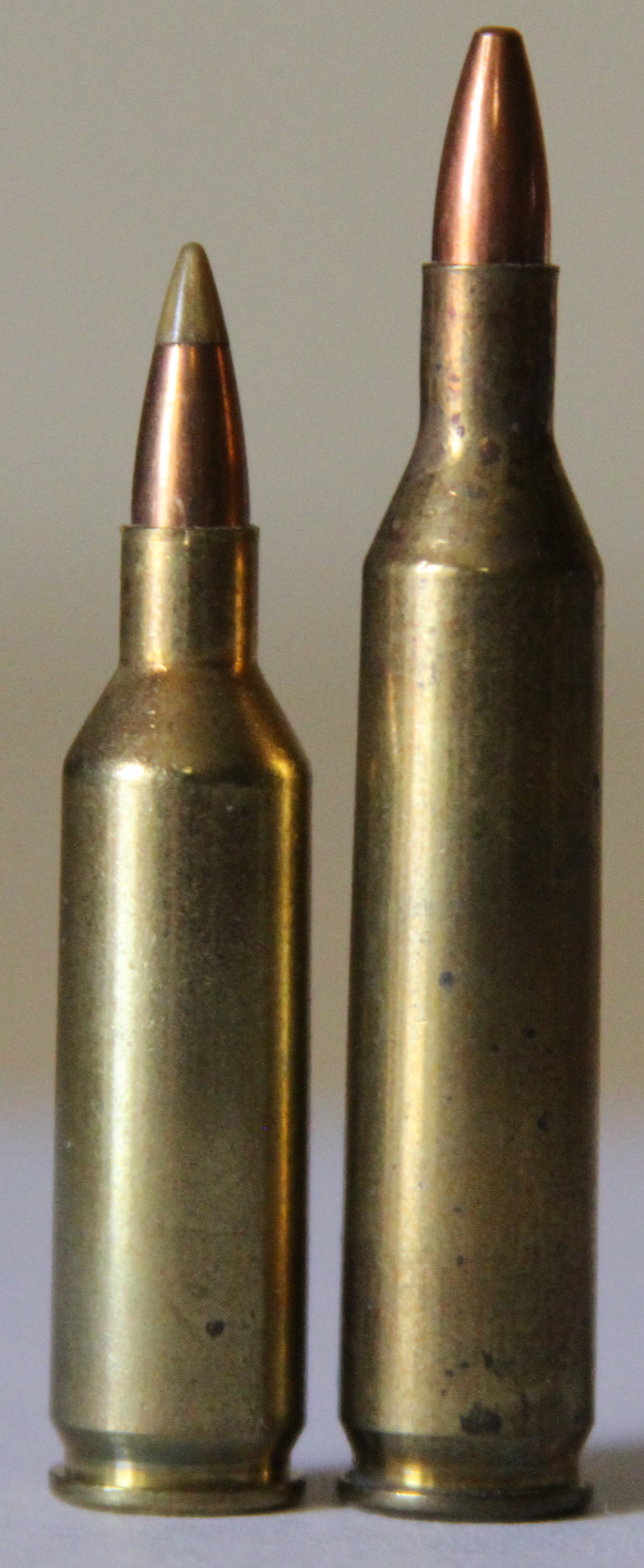
.17 Remington Fireball cartridge next to a .17 Remington cartridge

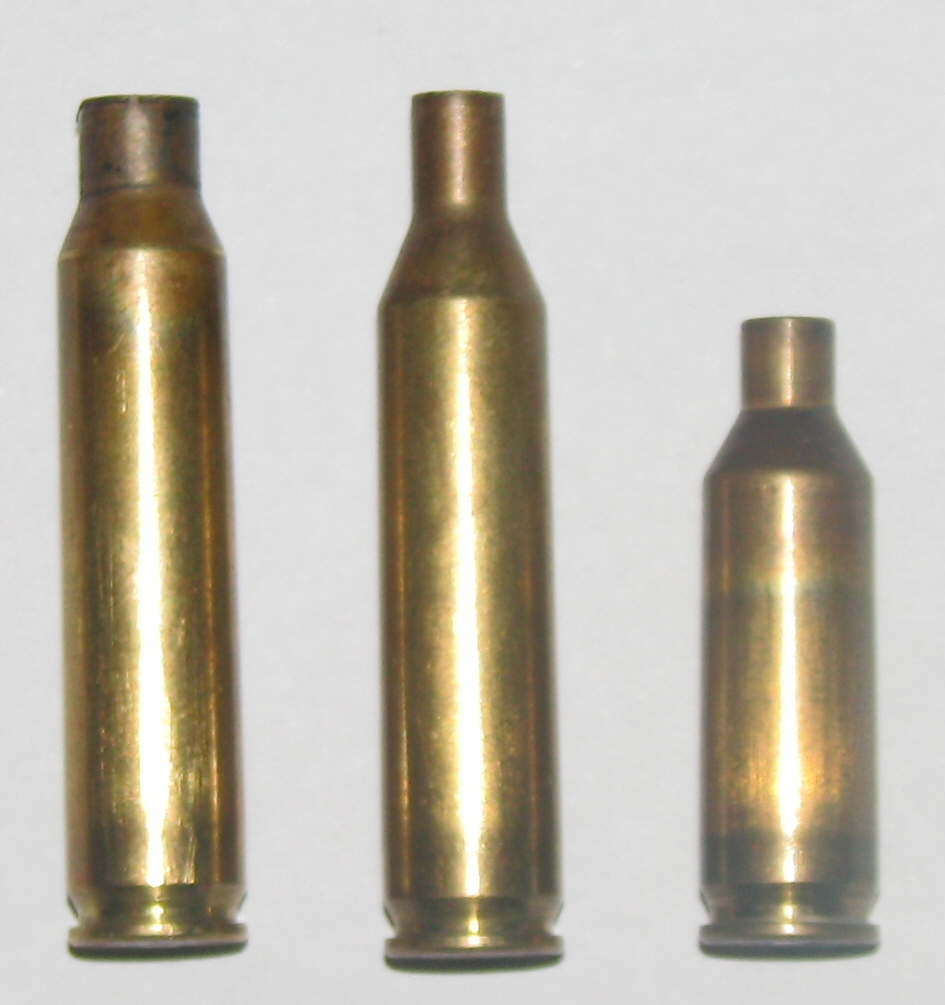
Left to right - .223 Rem, .17 Rem, .17 Fireball cases

== See also ==
- 4 mm caliber
- .17 Hornet
- .17 Ackley Bee
- List of rifle cartridges
- Table of handgun and rifle cartridges
