= .17 Mach IV =

Rifle cartridge

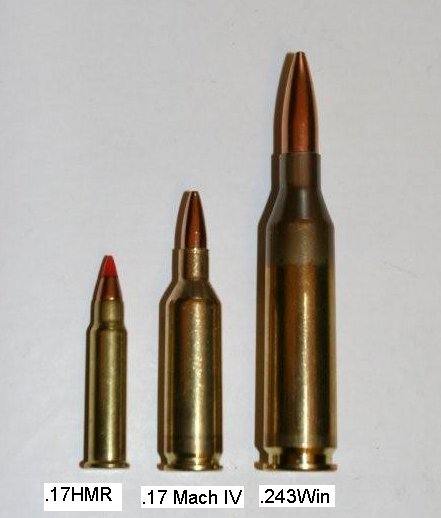
- Left to right: .17 HMR, .17 Mach IV, .243 Win
- Type: Rifle
- Place of origin: United States

Production history
- Designer: Vern O Brien
- Designed: 1962

Specifications
- Parent case: .221 Remington Fireball
- Case type: rimless bottlenecked
- Bullet diameter: .172 in (4.4 mm)
- Neck diameter: .206 in (5.2 mm)
- Shoulder diameter: .361 in (9.2 mm)
- Base diameter: .378 in (9.6 mm)
- Rim diameter: .378 in (9.6 mm)
- Rim thickness: .045 in (1.1 mm)
- Case length: 1.400 in (35.6 mm)
- Overall length: 1.830 in (46.5 mm)
- Rifling twist: 1 in 10 in (250 mm)
- Primer type: Small Rifle

Ballistic performance
Bullet mass/type	Velocity	Energy
25 gr (2 g) HP	3,680 ft/s (1,120 m/s)	797 ft⋅lbf (1,081 J)
25 gr (2 g) HP	3,890 ft/s (1,190 m/s)	849 ft⋅lbf (1,151 J)
- Source(s): 6mmBR Hodgdon

The .17 Mach IV / 4.4x35mm is a wildcat centerfire rifle cartridge, based on the .221 Remington Fireball case, necked down to fire a 0.172 inches (4.4 mm) bullet. The cartridge was introduced in 1962 by Vern O'Brien. The cartridge offered an easy case conversion and good ballistics, but could not compete against the .17 Remington.

The name, Mach IV, comes from the claim that the bullets can reach 4,000 ft/s (1,200 m/s; Mach 3.6). Due to the relatively small case capacity, even small variations in powder of 0.5 gr (0.032 g) can lead to the difference between a safe and dangerously over pressure load. Aftermarket barrels for the XP-100 pistol were sometimes marked ".17 Mach III" due to the lower velocity produced by the shorter barrel.

The .17 Mach IV became very popular with varmint hunters, so much so that in 2007, Remington introduced its own very similar version, the .17 Remington Fireball.

== See also ==
- .17 Remington Fireball
- .221 Remington Fireball
- 4 mm caliber
- List of rifle cartridges
