= Calhoon cartridges =

Type of gun cartridge

.19 Calhoon Hornet
- Type: Hunting
- Place of origin: USA

Production history
- Designer: James Calhoon
- Designed: 1997
- Manufacturer: James Calhoon
- Produced: 1998

Specifications
- Parent case: .22 Hornet
- Case type: Bottlenecked
- Bullet diameter: .198 in (5.0 mm)
- Neck diameter: .215 in (5.5 mm)
- Shoulder diameter: .286 in (7.3 mm)
- Base diameter: .294 in (7.5 mm)
- Rim diameter: .350 in (8.9 mm)
- Rim thickness: .063 in (1.6 mm)
- Case length: 1.390 in (35.3 mm)
- Primer type: small rifle

Ballistic performance
Bullet mass/type	Velocity	Energy
27 gr (2 g) hp	3,600 ft/s (1,100 m/s)	777 ft⋅lbf (1,053 J)

.19-223
- Type: Rifle
- Place of origin: USA

Production history
- Designer: James Calhoon
- Manufacturer: James Calhoon
- Produced: 1997

Specifications
- Parent case: .223 Remington
- Case type: Rimless, bottleneck
- Bullet diameter: .198 in (5.0 mm)
- Neck diameter: .224 in (5.7 mm)
- Shoulder diameter: .364 in (9.2 mm)
- Base diameter: .373 in (9.5 mm)
- Rim diameter: .375 in (9.5 mm)
- Case length: 1.760 in (44.7 mm)
- Primer type: Small rifle

Ballistic performance
Bullet mass/type	Velocity	Energy
32 gr (2 g) hp	4,100 ft/s (1,200 m/s)	1,194 ft⋅lbf (1,619 J)
36 gr (2 g) HP	3,800 ft/s (1,200 m/s)	1,154 ft⋅lbf (1,565 J)
40 gr (3 g) HP	3,700 ft/s (1,100 m/s)	1,216 ft⋅lbf (1,649 J)
44 gr (3 g) HP	3,600 ft/s (1,100 m/s)	1,266 ft⋅lbf (1,716 J)
- Source: Calhoon Website

.19 Badger
- Type: Rifle
- Place of origin: USA

Production history
- Designer: James Calhoon
- Designed: 2001
- Manufacturer: James Calhoon
- Produced: 2003

Specifications
- Parent case: .30 Carbine
- Case type: Rimless, bottleneck
- Bullet diameter: .198 in (5.0 mm)
- Neck diameter: .224 in (5.7 mm)
- Shoulder diameter: .340 in (8.6 mm)
- Base diameter: .351 in (8.9 mm)
- Case length: 1.305 in (33.1 mm)

Ballistic performance
Bullet mass/type	Velocity	Energy
28 gr (2 g) hp	3,725 ft/s (1,135 m/s)	863 ft⋅lbf (1,170 J)
32 gr (2 g) HP	3,550 ft/s (1,080 m/s)	896 ft⋅lbf (1,215 J)

Calhoon cartridges are a class of .19 (4.85 mm) caliber cartridges created by James Calhoon, a firearms designer with an interest in that bore size. Calhoon began working with .19 caliber after his interest was piqued from learning about British sub-caliber rifle trials in the early 1970s. The .19 caliber rifles have thicker rifling than .17 and .20 caliber rifles, which helps the barrels stay clean longer and improves barrel life.

== Variants ==
=== .19 Calhoon Hornet ===
The .19 Calhoon Hornet is a .19 caliber rifle wildcat cartridge. The cartridge is based on a necked-down blown-out .22 Hornet cartridge. This provides less stretching, and greater case capacity with a lighter bullet. The result is a flatter trajectory when compared to the .22 Hornet. Having a larger bore than the .17 caliber centerfires helps mitigate some of the fouling problems that rifles in that caliber tend to have.

=== .19-223 ===
The .19-223 is the second in a set of .19 caliber rounds created by James Calhoon. The cartridge is based on a necked-down .223 Remington cartridge. This gives higher velocity and a flatter trajectory than would be found with typical .223 loads.

=== .19 Badger ===
The .19 Badger is the third (currently in 2003 the latest) of the .19 caliber rounds created by Calhoon. This was an attempt to take the features of his earlier cartridges the .19 Calhoon Hornet and the .19-223 and create a powerful and efficient cartridge. This cartridge is based on the rimless .30 M1 Carbine case, which has almost the same rim diameter as a .22 Hornet but has fewer potential feeding problems in some rifles because of the lack of a rim. The 19 Badger is a 19 caliber cartridge designed by Calhoon. It is described as having a balance between performance and low recoil.

== See also ==
- List of firearms
- List of rifle cartridges
- 5 mm caliber
