= .20 Tactical =

Cartridge

- Type: Rifle
- Place of origin: United States

Production history
- Designer: Todd Kindler

Specifications
- Parent case: .223 Remington
- Case type: Rimless, bottleneck
- Bullet diameter: .204 in (5.2 mm)
- Neck diameter: .233 in (5.9 mm)
- Shoulder diameter: .361 in (9.2 mm)
- Base diameter: .376 in (9.6 mm)
- Rim diameter: .378 in (9.6 mm)
- Case length: 1.76 in (45 mm)
- Overall length: 2.130 in (54.1 mm)
- Primer type: Small rifle

Ballistic performance
Bullet mass/type	Velocity	Energy
32 gr (2 g) V-MAX	4,000 ft/s (1,200 m/s)	1,137 ft⋅lbf (1,542 J)
40 gr (3 g) V-MAX	3,750 ft/s (1,140 m/s)	1,249 ft⋅lbf (1,693 J)

The .20 Tactical / 5.2x45mm is a wildcat centerfire rifle cartridge, based on the .223 Remington case, necked down to fire a 5.2 millimetres (0.204 in) caliber bullet. The .20 Tactical was designed by Todd Kindler and predates the .204 Ruger factory round. The case has approximately 0.2 grams (3 gr) less powder capacity than the popular .204 Ruger. Handloaders can get velocities with 2.1 and 2.6 grams (32 and 40 gr) projectiles that almost match the .204 Ruger. Furthermore, the .20 Tactical is also able to achieve these velocities with less powder than the .204 Ruger by more efficiently using high energy propellants such as Alliant Reloader 7 and Winchester 748. Based on the .223 Remington, a wide selection of brass is available, and can also be formed from .223 casings by use of a forming die.

== See also ==
- .204 Ruger
- .20 VarTarg
- .221 Fireball
- .20 BR
- 5 mm caliber
- List of rifle cartridges
