= .20 VarTarg =

Rifle cartridge

- Type: Rifle
- Place of origin: United States

Production history
- Designer: Todd Kindler

Specifications
- Parent case: .221 Remington Fireball
- Case type: Rimless, bottleneck
- Bullet diameter: .204 in (5.2 mm)
- Neck diameter: .233 in (5.9 mm)
- Shoulder diameter: .361 in (9.2 mm)
- Base diameter: .376 in (9.6 mm)
- Rim diameter: .378 in (9.6 mm)
- Rim thickness: .045 in (1.1 mm)
- Case length: 1.395 in (35.4 mm)
- Overall length: 1.855 in (47.1 mm)
- Primer type: Small rifle

Ballistic performance
Bullet mass/type	Velocity	Energy
32 gr (2 g) Sierra	3,973 ft/s (1,211 m/s)	1,122 ft⋅lbf (1,521 J)
40 gr (3 g) V-Max	3,392 ft/s (1,034 m/s)	1,022 ft⋅lbf (1,386 J)
- Source(s): Accurate Powders

The .20 VarTarg is a wildcat centerfire rifle cartridge, based on the .221 Remington Fireball case, necked down to fire a 5.2 millimetres (0.204 in) bullet.

The cartridge was created in 1996 by Todd Kindler, president of The Woodchuck Den, located in Baltic, Ohio. The name VarTarg is a portmanteau of varmint and target.

== See also ==
- .204 Ruger
- .20 Tactical
- .221 Fireball
- 5 mm caliber
- List of rifle cartridges
