= Murder of Gunnar Tryggvason =

1968 murder in Reykjavík, Iceland

Gunnar Sigurður Tryggvason (17 June 1925 – 18 January 1968) was an Icelandic cab driver who was murdered in the early morning of 18 January 1968, in Reykjavík, Iceland. The murder has never been solved.

== Murder ==
Gunnar's body was discovered by passersby in the early morning of 18 January 1968, in the driver's seat of his Mercedes-Benz taxi, with a bullet wound to the back of his head. The engine was still running and the taximeter was on. It was determined that he had been murdered between 5:15 and 6:00 am.

== Suspects ==
The murder weapon was a Smith & Wesson Model 1913, which had been stolen in 1965 from Jóhannes Jósefsson, better known as Jóhannes á Borg. In 1969, it was found in a car owned by another taxi driver who admitted to having stolen it, but denied having killed Gunnar. He was charged for the murder but found not guilty due to lack of evidence.

Several decades later, a witness came forward and claimed that when he was a child, a friend of his mother, Þráinn Hleinar Kristjánsson, came to their house in 1969 while his mother was away, and showed him a gun, claiming he had used it to shoot Gunnar. This led him and his sister, who was also present in 1969, to take part in a police line-up where they were separately told to point at one of five pictures. One of the pictures was Þráinn from around 1970, and the others were random men. Both siblings were drawn to and pointed at the picture of Þráinn.

In 1979, Þráinn was convicted of an unrelated murder and sentenced to 16 years in prison.

== In popular culture ==
The murder case was featured in the 2007 book Morðið á Laugarlæk by Þorsteinn Bergmann Einarsson. In 2020, it was featured in the radio show Sönn íslensk sakamál. In 2024, the murder was featured on the TV show Íslensk sakamál on Síminn TV.
