= 4 mm caliber =

Firearm cartridge classification

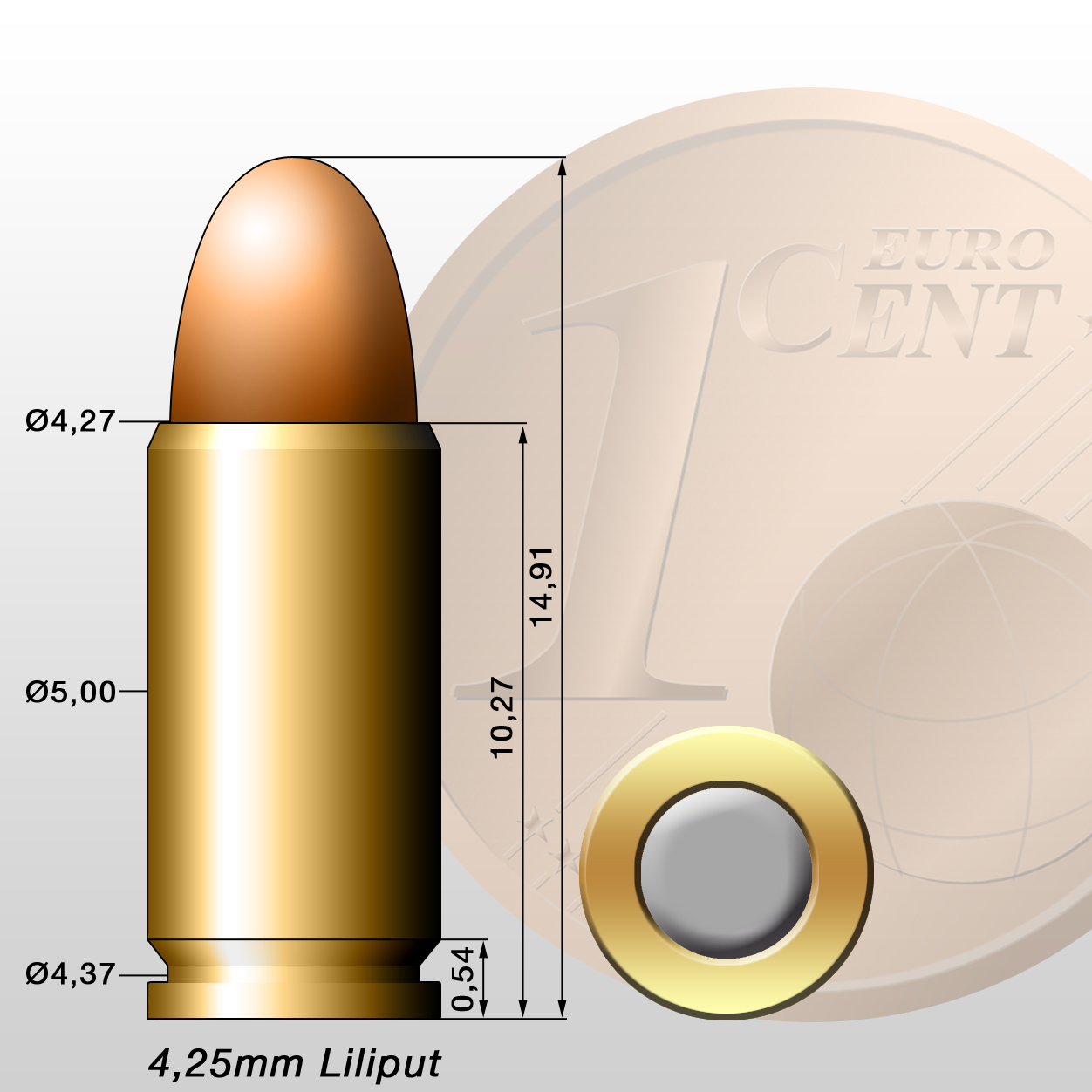
- An example of a 4 mm cartridge, a 4.25mm Liliput including an example of 1 Euro cent by scale
- Firearm cartridges
- « 2 mm, 3 mm 4 mm 5 mm, 6 mm »

This is a list of firearm cartridges which have bullets in the 4 millimetres (0.16 in) to 4.99 millimetres (0.196 in) caliber range.

All measurements are in mm (in).

== Rimfire cartridges ==
Name	Bullet	Case length	Rim	Base	Shoulder	Neck	Overall length
4 mm Randz Court	4.5 (.18)	6.1 (.21)	5.9 (.23)	4.6 (.18)	-	-	9.13 (0.36)
4 mm Randz Lang	4.5 (.18)	8.2 (.32)	5.9 (.23)	4.6 (.18)	-	-	10.8 (0.43)
.17 Mach 2	4.368 (.172)	18.14 (.714)	6.99 (.275)	5.74 (.226)	5.74 (.226)	4.57 (.180)	25.4 (1.0)
.17 HMR	4.368 (.172)	26.87 (1.058)	6.99 (.275)	5.74 (.226)	5.74 (.226)	4.57 (.180)	34.26 (1.349)
.17 PMC/Aguila	4.4 (.172)	15.0 (.591)	6.9 (.271)	-	-	-	25 (.984)
.17 Munisalva	4.5 (.177)	6.3 (.248)	6.8 (.268)	-	-	-	10.8 (.425)
.17 Winchester Super Magnum	4.382 (.1725)	30.48 (1.200)	8.46 (.333)	6.83 (.269)	6.833 (.2690)	5.004 (.1970)	40.39 (1.590)
4.5×26mm MKR	4.5 (.177)	-	-	-	-	-	-

== Centerfire cartridges ==
=== Pistol and PDW cartridges ===
Name	Bullet	Case type	Case length	Rim	Base	Shoulder	Neck	Overall length
4.25mm Liliput	4.242 (.167)		10.41 (.410)	5.029 (.198)	5.029 (.198)	-	5.029 (.198)	14.22 (.560)
4.38×30mm Libra	4.28 (.169)		30.10 (1.185)	7.65 (.301)	7.56 (.298)	6.88 (.271)	4.90 (.193 )	41.00 (1.614)
4.5x40mmR for SPP-1	4.5 (0.18)		8.29 (.326)	7.53 (.296)	6.75 (.266)	5.11 (.201)		144.25 (5.678)
4.6×30mm HK	4.65 (.183)	Rebated straight walled bottlenecked	30.50 (1.201)	8.00 (.315)	8.02 (.316)	7.75 (.305)	5.31 (0.209)	38.50 (1.516)

=== Revolver cartridges ===
Name	Bullet	Case length	Rim	Base	Shoulder	Neck	Overall length
.17 Bumble Bee	4.368 (.172)	23.37 (.920)	10.36 (.408)	8.890 (.350)	8.636 (.340)	4.547 (.197)	-
4mm M20 (4×10 mm)	4.89 (.1925)	7.13 (.28)	5.69 (.224)	5.03 (0.198)	-	-	9.1 (0.358)

=== Rifle cartridges ===
Name	Bullet	Case type	Case length	Rim	Base	Shoulder	Neck	Overall length
.17 Hornet	4.368 (.172)		35.6 (1.400)	8.9 (.350)	7.6 (.299)	7.3 (.288)	4.9 (.193)	43.69 (1.720)
.17 Mach IV	4.368 (.172)		35.6 (1.40)	9.6 (.378)	9.6 (.378)	9.2 (.361)	5.2 (.206)	-
.17 Remington	4.368 (.172)		45.62 (1.796)	9.601 (.378)	9.550 (.376)	9.042 (.356)	5.055 (.199)	55.118 (2.170)
.17 Remington Fireball	4.368 (.172)		36.07 (1.420)	9.60 (.378)	9.57 (.3769)	9.33 (.3673)	5.23 (.206)	46.48 (1.830)
.17 Ackley Bee	4.4 (.172)		34 (1.35)	10.4 (.408)	8.9 (.349)	8.5 (.334)	5.0 (.195)	-
4.6×36mm	4.65 (.183)		35.61 (1.402)	8.94 (.352)	8.94 (.352)	8.48 (.334)	5.27 (.207)	49.16 (1.935 )
4.32×45mm SBR	-		-	-	-	-	-	-
4.85×49mm	5.0 (.197)	Rimless bottlenecked	48.9 (1.925)	9.6 (.376)	9.5 (.375)	9.0 (.353)	5.6 (.220)	62.4 (2.455)

== See also ==
- .177 caliber
