= .222 Remington Magnum =

Rifle cartridge

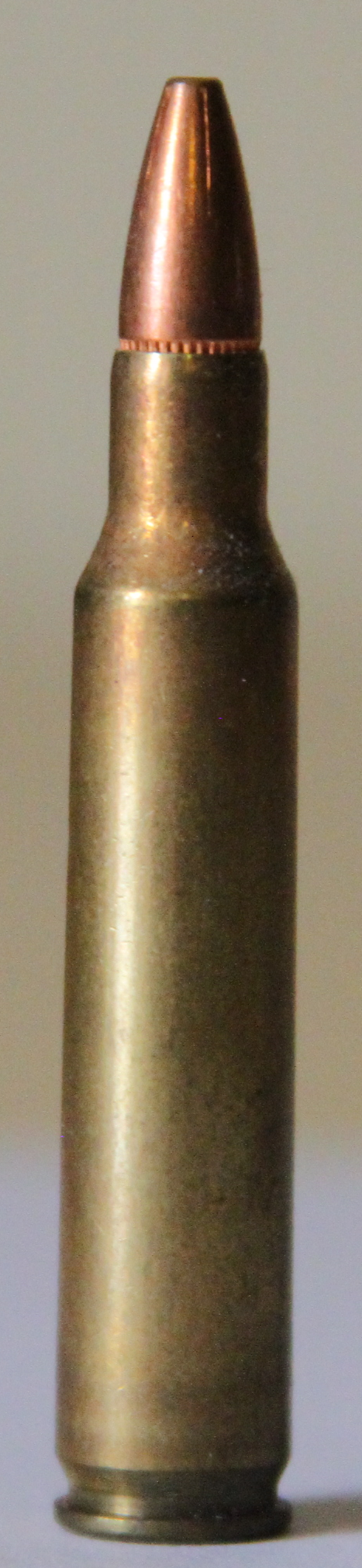
- Type: Rifle
- Place of origin: United States

Production history
- Designer: Remington
- Designed: 1957
- Produced: 1958–present

Specifications
- Parent case: .222 Remington
- Case type: Rimless, bottleneck
- Bullet diameter: .224 in (5.7 mm)
- Neck diameter: .253 in (6.4 mm)
- Shoulder diameter: .357 in (9.1 mm)
- Base diameter: .376 in (9.6 mm)
- Rim diameter: .378 in (9.6 mm)
- Case length: 1.850 in (47.0 mm)
- Overall length: 2.280 in (57.9 mm)
- Rifling twist: 1-12 in (300 mm)
- Primer type: Small rifle
- Maximum CUP: 50,000 CUP

Ballistic performance
Bullet mass/type	Velocity	Energy
40 gr (3 g) SP	3,818 ft/s (1,164 m/s)	1,295 ft⋅lbf (1,756 J)
50 gr (3 g) SP	3,476 ft/s (1,059 m/s)	1,342 ft⋅lbf (1,820 J)
55 gr (4 g) SP	3,294 ft/s (1,004 m/s)	1,325 ft⋅lbf (1,796 J)
- Test barrel length: 24"; Source(s): Hodgdon

The .222 Remington Magnum was a short-lived commercially produced cartridge derived from the .222 Remington. Originally developed for a US military prototype ArmaLite AR-15 rifle in 1958, the cartridge was not adopted by the military, but was introduced commercially in sporting rifles.

== Development ==
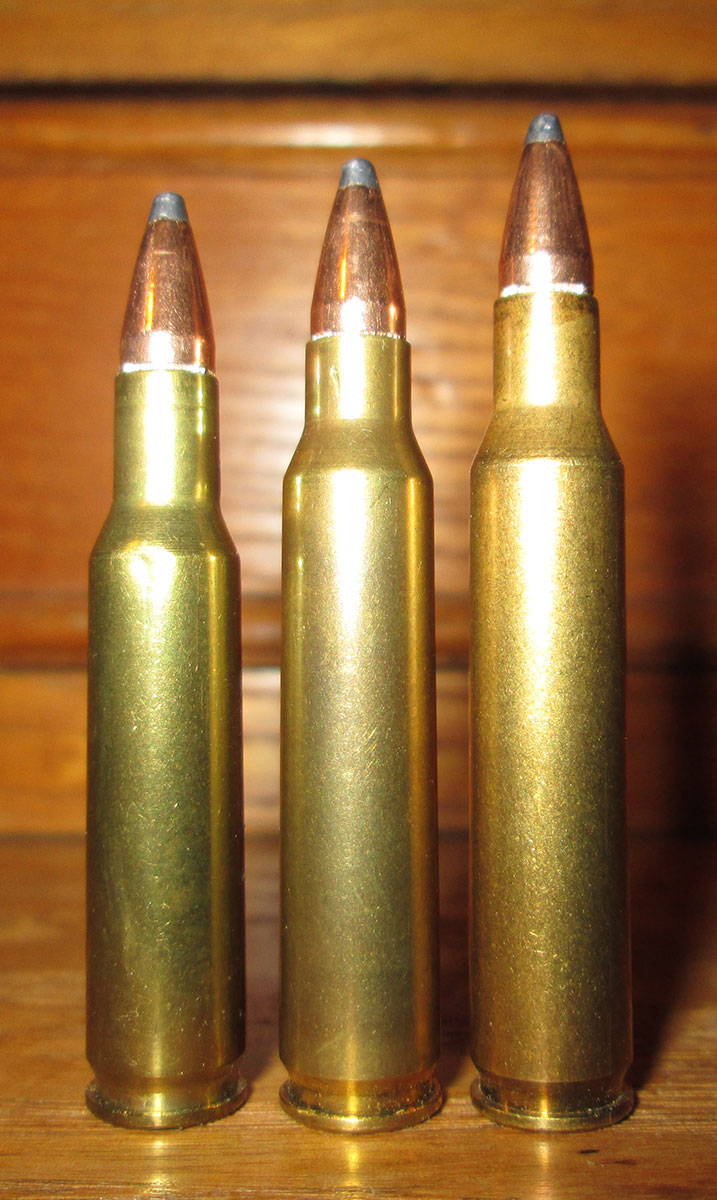
From left: .222 Remington, .223 Remington and .222 Remington Magnum

The .222 Remington Magnum was created by lengthening the case and shortening the neck of the highly accurate and very popular .222 Remington cartridge, which dominated varmint and benchrest shooting during the 1950s. Case capacity is about 20% greater than that of the .222 Remington, producing moderately higher muzzle velocities. The .222 Remington Magnum served as the basis for the German-developed 5.6×50mm Magnum sporting cartridge.

== History ==
During the late 1950s, ArmaLite and other U.S. firearm designers started their individual Small Caliber/High Velocity (SCHV) rifle experiments using the commercial .222 Remington cartridge. When it became clear that there was not enough case capacity to meet U.S. Continental Army Command's (CONARC) velocity and penetration requirements, ArmaLite contacted Remington to create a similar cartridge with a longer case body and shorter neck. This became the .222 Special. At the same time, Springfield Armory's Earle Harvey had Remington create an even longer cartridge case then known as the .224 Springfield. Springfield was forced to drop out of the CONARC competition, and thus the .224 Springfield was released in 1958 as a commercial sporting cartridge known as the .222 Remington Magnum. To prevent confusion among all of the competing .222 cartridge designations, the .222 Special was renamed the .223 Remington in 1959. In the spring of 1962 Remington submitted the specifications of the .223 Remington to the Sporting Arms and Ammunition Manufacturers' Institute (SAAMI). With the U.S. military adoption of the M16 assault rifle in 1963, the .223 Remington in a slightly derived form was standardized as the 5.56×45mm NATO. As a commercial sporting cartridge the .223 Remington was introduced in 1964.

== Obsolescence ==
The .223 Remington cartridge has a shorter neck and the shoulder is moved back slightly compared to the .222 Remington Magnum. Case capacity is about 5% smaller than that of the .222 Remington Magnum, but it was loaded to a slightly higher pressure, so the two have essentially identical ballistics. As any widely used military cartridge is guaranteed to be a success on the commercial market, the .223 Remington sold exceptionally well and the .222 Remington Magnum faded rather quickly. In Europe SAKO produces the cartridge and some gun manufacturers offer the chambering. In the United States Remington continued to offer the .222 Remington Magnum in a couple of target and varmint rifle models for many years, but currently there are no commercial manufacturers in the U.S. either of rifles or ammunition in .222 Remington Magnum other than Cooper Firearms of Montana. For many .222 Magnum shooters handloading of this cartridge provides ammunition, using components otherwise available for the other more popular .22 centrefire rounds. The .222 Remington Magnum cartridge case became the parent case for a new development introduced in 2004, the .204 Ruger. The .204 Ruger is based on the .222 Remington Magnum case necked down to hold a .20 caliber (5 mm) bullet.

== See also ==
- List of rifle cartridges
- 5 mm caliber
