= 5 mm caliber =

Firearm cartridge classification

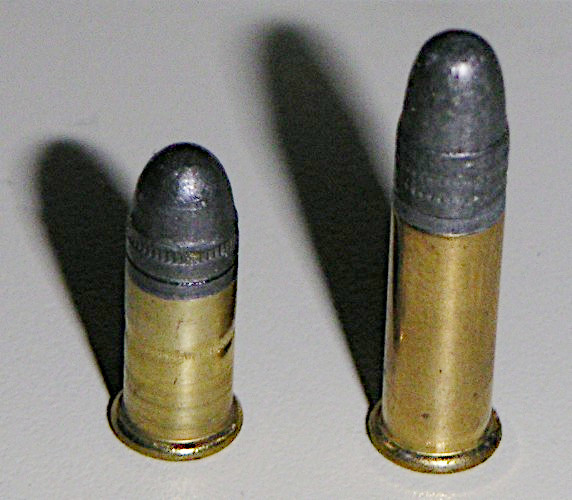
- Examples of 5 mm cartridges, .22 Short (left) and .22 Long Rifle (5.6×10mmR and 5.6×15mmR)
- Firearm cartridges
- « 3 mm, 4 mm 5 mm 6 mm, 7 mm »

This is a list of firearm cartridges which have bullets in the 5.00 to 5.99 mm (0.197 to 0.236 in) caliber range.

- Length refers to the cartridge case length.
- OAL refers to the overall length of the cartridge.

All measurements are in mm (in).

== Rimfire cartridges ==
Name	Case type	Bullet	Case length	Rim	Base	Shoulder	Neck	OAL
5mm Remington Rimfire Magnum	bottlenecked	5.21 (.205)	25.91 (1.020)	8.25 (.325)	6.58 (.259)	6.58 (.259)	5.72 (.225)	33.0 (1.30)
.21 Sharp	straight	5.347 (.2105)	15.57 (.613)	7.06 (.278)	5.74 (.226)	N/A	5.74 (.226)	24.51 (.965) – 25.40 (1.000)
.22 BB Cap (Bulleted Breech Cap)	straight	5.639 (.222)	7.214 (.284)	6.86 (.270)	5.69 (.224)	N/A	5.69 (.224)	8.71 (.343)
.22 CB Cap (Conical Bullet Cap)	straight	5.639 (.222)	7.214 (.284)	6.88 (.271)	5.72 (.225)	N/A	5.72 (.225)	13.21 (.520)
.22 Short	straight	5.66 (.223)	10.74 (.423)	6.93 (.273)	5.72 (.225)	N/A	5.69 (.224)	17.42 (.686)
.22 Long	straight	5.66 (.223)	10.54 (.415)	6.91 (.272)	5.72 (.225)	N/A	5.69 (.224)	20.27 (.798)
.22 Long Rifle	straight	5.68 (.224)	15.11 (.595)	6.88 (.271)	5.74 (.226)	N/A	5.72 (.225)	25.0 (.984)
.22 Extra Long	straight	5.7 (.223)	19.1 (.750)	7.0 (.275)	5.74 (.226)	N/A	5.72 (.225)	29.0 (1.16)
.22 ILARCO (.22 American)	straight	5.7 (.224)	17.0 (.669)	7.5 (.294)	6.1 (.242)	N/A	6.1 (.242)	24.1 (.950)
.22 Winchester Rimfire (.22 Remington Special)	straight	5.689 (.224)	24.38 (.96)	7.39 (.291)	6.12 (.241)	N/A	6.10 (.240)	29.72 (1.17)
.22 Winchester Magnum Rimfire (.22 Magnum)	straight	5.689 (.224)	26.72 (1.052)	7.39 (.291)	6.12 (.241)	N/A	6.10 (.240)	34.29 (1.35)

== Pistol cartridges ==
Name	Case type	Bullet	Length	Rim	Base	Shoulder	Neck	Overall length
5mm Clement		5.131 (.202)	14.7 (.580)	6.9 (.273)	6.75(.265)	-	5.85 (.232)	21.43 (.844)
5mm Bergmann		5.156 (.203)	-	-	-	-	-	-
5mm Bergmann Rimless		5.156 (.203)	-	-	-	-	-	-
5.45×18mm Soviet		5.334 (.210)	17.78 (.701)	7.62 (.300)	7.62 (.300)	6.26 (.246)	5.588 (.220)	24.89 (.980)
.22 TCM		5.56 (.224)	26 (1.022)	9.6 (.378)	9.6 (.376)	9.2 (.362)	6.5 (.255)	32.1 (1.265)
FN 5.7×28mm	Rebated straight walled bottlenecked	5.689 (.224)	28.70 (1.13)	7.874 (.310)	7.874 (.310)	7.849 (.309)	6.325 (.249)	40.50 (1.594)
5.8×21mm		5.994 (.236)	21.00 (.827)	8.0 (.315)	7.95 (.313)	7.77 (.306)	6.57 (.259)	32.5 (1.280)

== Revolver cartridges ==
Name	Case type	Bullet	Length	Rim	Base	Shoulder	Neck	OAL
5mm Pickert		5.258 (.207)	-	-	-	-	-	-
.22 Remington Jet	Rimmed tapered bottlenecked	5.651 (.223)	32.51 (1.28)	11.2 (.440)	9.55 (.376)	8.89 (.350)	6.27 (.247)	40.13 (1.58)
5.5mm Velo Dog		5.715 (.225)	28.45 (1.12)	7.82 (.308)	6.43 (.253)	-	6.3 (.248)	34.29 (1.35)
5.43mm Louis Mattis		5.766 (.227)	-	-	-	-	-	-

== Rifle cartridges ==
Name	Caliber (mm)	Caliber (inch)	Case type	Case length (mm)	Case length (inch)	Rim (mm)	Rim (inch)	Base (mm)	Base (inch)	Shoulder (mm)	Shoulder (inch)	Neck (mm)	Neck (inch)	OAL (mm)	OAL (inch)	Primer
.19 Calhoon Hornet	5.030	0.198	rimmed bottlenecked	35.310	1.390	8.890	0.350	7.470	0.294	7.260	0.286	5.460	0.215	-	-	
.19 Badger	5.030	0.198	rimless bottlenecked	-	-	9.140	0.360	8.990	0.354	-	-	5.690	0.224	-	-	
.19-223	5.030	0.198	rimless bottlenecked	44.700	1.760	9.520	0.375	9.470	0.373	9.200	0.364	5.690	0.224	-	-	
5mm Craig	5.182	0.204	EVRC	25.930	1.021	8.130	0.320	6.530	0.257	6.500	0.256	5.870	0.231	31.500	1.240	CCI 450
.20 VarTarg	5.182	0.204	-	35.400	1.395	9.600	0.378	9.600	0.376	9.200	0.361	5.900	0.233	47.100	1.855	-
5mm/35 SMc	5.182	0.204	-	39.520	1.556	12.010	0.473	11.960	0.471	11.680	0.460	5.870	0.231	51.560	2.030	-
.20 Tactical	5.182	0.204	-	45.000	1.760	9.600	0.378	9.600	0.376	9.200	0.361	5.900	0.233	54.100	2.130	-
.204 Ruger	5.182	0.204	rimless bottlenecked	46.990	1.850	9.600	0.378	9.560	0.376	6.400	0.252	5.870	0.231	57.400	2.260	-
20 Nosler	5.194	.2045	rebated rim	46.99	1.850	9.60	.378	10.686	.4207	10.12	.398	5.94	.234	57.40	2.260	
5.45×39mm	5.600	0.220	-	39.620	1.560	10.010	0.394	10.030	0.395	7.290	0.287	6.248	0.246	56.390	2.220	-
5.6×35mmR Vierling	5.63	0.223	-	35.50	-	-	-	8.85	-	-	-	-	-	43.50	-	-
5.66×39mm	-	-	-	-	-	-	-	-	-	-	-	-	-	-		
.218 Bee	5.689	0.224	-	34.160	1.345	10.360	0.408	8.865	0.349	8.357	0.329	6.147	0.242	42.670	1.680	-
.220 Russian	5.689	0.224	-	38.7	1.52	11.200	0.441	11.180	0.440	10.950	0.431	6.223	0.245	46.230	1.820	-
.22 Hornet	5.689	0.224	rimmed	35.640	1.403	8.890	0.350	7.569	0.298	7.010	0.276	6.172	0.243	43.760	1.723	-
5.56×45mm NATO, .223 Remington	5.689	0.224	rimless bottlenecked	44.700	1.760	9.601	0.378	9.550	0.376	8.992	0.354	6.426	0.253	57.400	2.260	-
.222 Remington Magnum	5.689	0.224	rimless bottlenecked	46.990	1.850	9.600	0.378	9.550	0.376	9.070	0.357	6.480	0.253	57.910	2.280	-
.22-250	5.689	0.224	-	48.560	1.912	12.010	0.473	11.910	0.469	10.520	0.414	6.450	0.254	59.690	2.350	-
.224 Weatherby Magnum	5.689	0.224	-	48.840	1.923	10.920	0.430	10.540	0.415	10.010	0.394	6.400	0.252	59.180	2.330	-
.220 Swift	5.689	0.224	-	56.010	2.205	12.010	0.473	11.300	0.445	10.210	0.402	6.600	0.260	68.070	2.680	-
.22 Spitfire	5.690	0.224	rimless bottlenecked	32.770	1.290	9.040	0.356	8.970	0.353	8.430	0.332	6.430	0.253	41.910	1.650	Boxer small rifle
.22 Creedmoor	5.690	0.224	rimless bottlenecked	48.768	1.920	12.010	0.473	11.900	0.470	11.735	0.462	6.477	0.255	68.580	2.700	-
.223 WSSM	5.690	0.224	rebated rim bottlenecked	42.420	1.670	13.590	0.535	14.100	0.555	13.820	0.544	6.910	0.272	59.940	2.360	-
5.6×50mm Magnum (5.6×50mmR)	5.690	0.224	-	50.040	1.970	9.550	0.376	9.520	0.375	9.020	0.355	6.450	0.254	56.130	2.210	-
5.6×57mm	5.70	0.224	Rimless, bottle necked	56.70	2.232	11.95	0.470	11.90	0.469	10.94	0.431	7.10	0.280	69.00	2.717	Large rifle
.22 ARC	5.70	0.224	rimless bottlenecked	38.70	1.525	11.2	0.441	11.2	0.441			10.91	0.4297	57.4	2.26	
FN 5.7×28mm	5.700	0.224	-	28.830	1.135	7.800	0.307	7.900	0.311	7.900	0.311	6.350	0.250	40.500	1.594	Boxer small rifle
22 PPC-USA	5.700	0.224	rimless bottlenecked	38.480		11.300		11.260		10.950		6.350		55.700		small rifle
.219 Zipper	5.700	0.224	Rimmed	49.200	1.938	12.900	0.506	10.700	0.422	9.300	0.365	6.400	0.253	57.400	2.260	-
224 Valkyrie	5.702	.224	rimless, bottlenecked	40.640	1.600	10.720	.422	10.686	.421	10.239	.403	6.502	.256	57.400	2.260	-
22 Nosler	5.702	.224	rebated rim, bottlenecked	44.700	1.760	9.600	.378	10.686	.421	10.169	.400	6.480	.255	57.400	2.260	-
.22 Savage Hi-Power	5.800	.227	rimmed, bottlenecked	52.000	2.050	12.700	.500	10.600	.416	9.100	.360	6.400	.252	64.000	2.510	-
.221 Remington Fireball	5.702	.224	rimless, bottlenecked	35.6	1.400	9.601	.378	9.550	.376	9.195	.362	6.426	.253	46.480	1.830	-
.222 Remington	5.702	.224	rimless, bottlenecked	43.2	1.700	9.600	.378	9.550	.376	9.070	.357	6.420	.253	54.100	2.130	-
.225 Winchester	5.702	.224	semi-rimmed, bottlenecked	49.0	1.930	12.010	.473	10.700	.422	10.300	.406	6.600	.260	64.000	2.500	-
.22 Winchester Centerfire	5.800	.228	rimmed, bottlenecked	35.000	1.390	8.700	.342	7.500	.278	7.100	.278	6.100	.241	41.000	1.610	-
5.8×42mm DBP87	5.994	.236	rimless, bottlenecked	42.545	1.675	10.389	.409	10.389	.409	9.350	.368	6.706	.264	57.500	2.266	-

== See also ==
- .22 caliber
