= 5 mm/35 SMc =

US wildcat rifle cartridge

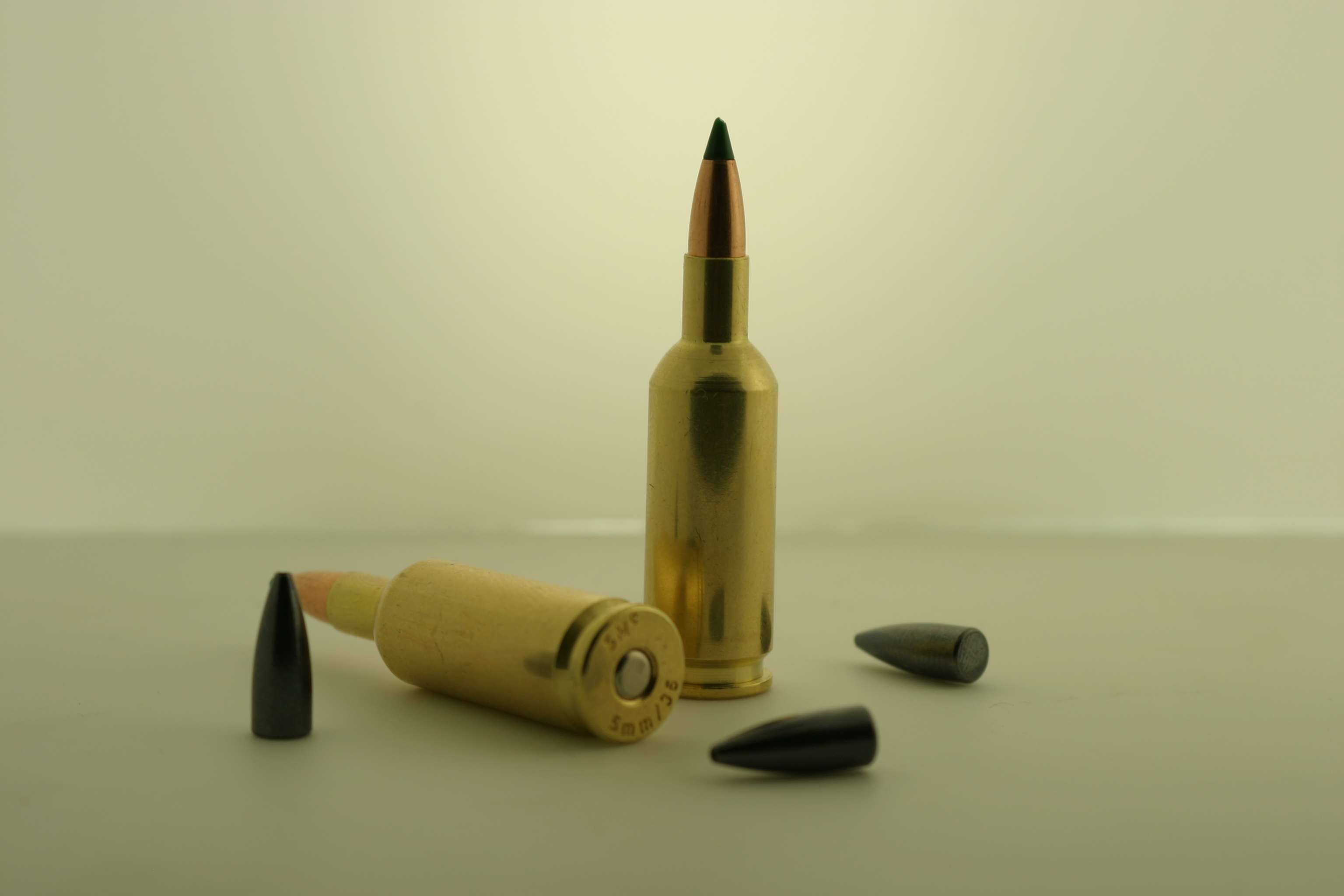
- 5 mm/35 SMc cartridges
- Type: Rifle
- Place of origin: USA

Production history
- Designer: Michael McPherson and Byrom Smalley
- Designed: 2004

Specifications
- Parent case: 6mm BR
- Case type: Rimless, bottleneck
- Bullet diameter: .2039 in (5.18 mm)
- Land diameter: .1988 in (5.05 mm)
- Neck diameter: .2343 in (5.95 mm)
- Shoulder diameter: .4598 in (11.68 mm)
- Base diameter: .4709 in (11.96 mm)
- Rim diameter: .4728 in (12.01 mm)
- Rim thickness: .0157 in (0.40 mm)
- Case length: 1.556 in (39.5 mm)
- Overall length: 2.03 in (52 mm)
- Rifling twist: 1-12
- Primer type: small rifle

Ballistic performance
Bullet mass/type	Velocity	Energy
32 gr (2 g) BT	4,650 ft/s (1,420 m/s)	1,535 ft⋅lbf (2,081 J)
39 gr (3 g) BT	4,250 ft/s (1,300 m/s)	1,564 ft⋅lbf (2,120 J)

5 mm/35 SMc (5mm-35) / 5×39mm SMc is a high performance 5 mm (.20 inch) intermediate cartridge. Designed by Michael McPherson and Byrom Smalley and like all of their other designs carries the "SMc" designation as well as being patented.

== Description ==
SMc cartridges were developed in an attempt to produce an efficient cartridge combining low recoil, low heat, and high velocity. The 5 mm/35 SMc has produced velocities in excess of 4,800 ft/s (1,500 m/s) shooting a 30-grain (1.9 g) molybdenum disulfide-coated Berger bullet from a 28-inch (71 cm) Pac-Nor barrel, far higher than its commercial counterpart the .204 Ruger.

Although it is a wildcat cartridge, rifles chambered for 5mm/35 are available from the custom shop at Savage Arms.

The patents for the cartridge are US 7210260, US 7086336 and US 2003079639.

== See also ==
- 5.56×45mm
- .204 Ruger
- .20 Tactical
- 5 mm caliber
