= .22 CHeetah =

Rifle cartridge

- Type: Rifle
- Place of origin: United States

Production history
- Designer: Jim Carmichel and Fred Huntington

Specifications
- Parent case: 308 BR
- Case type: Rimless, bottleneck
- Bullet diameter: .22 in (5.6 mm)
- Primer type: Small Rifle

Ballistic performance
Bullet mass/type	Velocity	Energy
50 gr (3 g)	4,300 ft/s (1,300 m/s)	2,018 ft⋅lbf (2,736 J)

The .22 CHeetah (both C and H are upper-case, referring to Carmichel / Huntington) is a .22 wildcat cartridge developed in the 1970s or 1980s by Jim Carmichel and Fred Huntington.

The .22 CHeetah is essentially a Remington .308 BR (empty .308 Winchester cases), modified to fit the .22 caliber. Two custom gunmakers, Shilen Rifle Company and Wichita Engineering, made rifles specifically for the cartridge. The cartridge's 50-grain .22-caliber bullets have a muzzle speed upward of 4,300 ft/s (4,250 according to some), and the cartridge is known for its long-range accuracy and velocity. Its high intensity is notoriously hard on barrels, which require constant cleaning.
