= 3 mm caliber =

Firearm cartridge classification

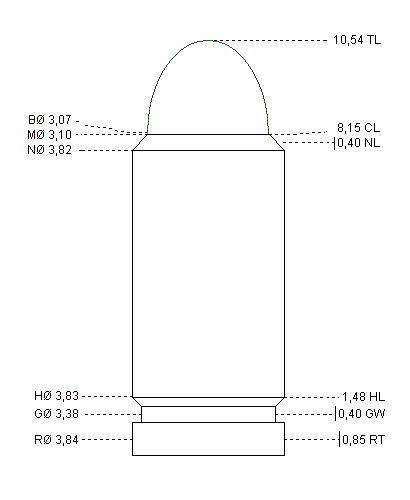
- 3mm Kolibri cartridge dimensions
- Firearm cartridges
- « ~~1 mm~~, 2 mm 3 mm 4 mm, 5 mm »

This is a list of firearm cartridges which have bullets in the 3 millimetres (0.12 in) to 3.99 millimetres (0.157 in) caliber range.

All measurements are in mm (in).

== 3 mm cartridges ==
Name	Bullet diameter	Neck	Shoulder	Base	Rim	Case length	Overall length
3mm Kolibri	3.048 (.120)	3.810 (.150)	N/A	3.810 (.150)	3.810 (.150)	8.128 (.320)	10.92 (.430)
3mm US	3.048 (.120)	4 (.157)	9.3 (0.366)	10 (.393)	10 (.393)	47 (1.85)	55 (2.16)
.12 Eichelberger Long Rifle	3.1 (.123)	3.6 (.140)	5.7 (.224)	5.7 (.225)	7.0 (.275)	14.4 (.568)	?
.12 Eichelberger Win Mag RF	3.1 (.123)	3.6 (.140)	6.0 (.238)	6.1 (.241)	7.4 (.293)	27.0 (1.064)	?
.12 Cooper	3.1 (.123)	3.7 (.145)	6.3 (.247)	6.3 (.249)	7.8 (.308)	28.1 (1.106)	?
.12 Eichelberger Carbine	3.1 (.123)	3.7 (.147)	9.0 (.356)	9.0 (.356)	9.1 (.360)	31 (1.24)	?
.14 Eichelberger Dart	3.7 (.144)	4.2 (.164)	7.0 (.274)	7.1 (.278)	7.6 (.301)	16.3 (.640)	?
.14 Cooper	3.7 (.144)	4.2 (.166)	6.3 (.247)	6.3 (.249)	7.84 (.3085)	28.0 (1.104)	?
.14 Walker Hornet	3.7 (.144)	4.3 (.170)	7.2 (.285)	7.5 (.294)	8.9 (.350)	34 (1.35)	?
.14 Jet Junior	3.7 (.144)	4.5 (.177)	9.3 (.366)	9.6 (.378)	11.2 (.440)	32 (1.26)	?
.14 Eichelberger Bee	3.7 (.144)	4.1 (.162)	8.4 (.329)	8.9 (.349)	10.4 (.408)	33 (1.31)	?
.14-222	3.7 (.144)	4.2 (.165)	9.0 (.356)	9.5 (.375)	9.5 (.375)	43 (1.70)	49 (1.92)
.14/222 Eichelberger Mag	3.7 (.144)	4.3 (.170)	9.0 (.356)	9.6 (.376)	9.6 (.378)	47 (1.85)	?
