= Chamber reamer =

Reamer used by gunsmiths and firearms manufacturers

A chamber reamer is a specific type of fluted reamer used by gunsmiths and firearms manufacturers to cut the chamber of a handgun, rifle, or shotgun. The chamber reamer is inserted into the bore of a barrel and held stationary while the barrel is turned around it (typically by means of a lathe). The reamer slowly cuts away material, leaving a chamber capable of accepting a specific cartridge.

== Types ==
Chamber reamers come in two general types - solid pilot reamers and floating pilot reamers. A solid pilot reamer has, as the name suggests, a solid steel pilot on the end to guide the reamer through the bore of the barrel. These reamers are generally more durable and less expensive than floating pilot reamers. Floating pilot reamers use interchangeable pilots that are positioned at the front of the reamer. The primary advantage of a floating pilot reamer is that it is self-centering and can be fitted with a pilot that is an exact match with the barrel it is passing through. Barrels tend to vary in diameter by minute amounts, and this variation can create a situation whereby the solid pilot reamer fits too loosely or too snugly in the bore. Another advantage of floating pilot reamers is that the pilot itself does not spin with the reamer, and therefore is less likely to damage the bore. The primary disadvantage of the floating point reamer is that the nose of the reamer must be cut down in diameter to accommodate the reamer pilot, resulting in a more delicate reamer.

Chamber reamers are typically made of high speed steel and require lubrication during the cutting operation. A chamber reamer, regardless of pilot design, will operate most efficiently at speed of 200 to 300 RPM, and feed rate just fast enough to avoid chatter. Chamber reamers are designed with flutes to collect and extract the cut material, however these flutes must be periodically cleaned (typically after every .2" of cutting). Finally, reamers must be sharpened from time to time. Given proper care, a reamer can cut 10-15 chambers between sharpening.

Manufacturers produce most chamber reamers to SAAMI specifications so that any factory ammunition can be safely used in any firearm chambered with their reamer, for a given cartridge. Most reamer manufacturers will, however, produce reamers to customer specifications. These are useful to benchrest shooters who are willing to trade off compatibility for accuracy, and by 'wildcatters' - individuals who are interested in designing completely new cartridges.
