= .35 S&W Auto =

Pistol cartridge

.35 Smith & Wesson
- Type: Pistol
- Place of origin: United States

Production history
- Designed: 1912
- Manufacturer: Smith & Wesson
- Produced: 1913-1921

Specifications
- Case type: Rimless, straight
- Bullet diameter: .32
- Neck diameter: 8.82 mm (0.347 in)
- Base diameter: 8.83 mm (0.348 in)
- Rim diameter: 8.85 mm (0.348 in)
- Case length: 17.21 mm (0.678 in)
- Overall length: 24.16 mm (0.951 in)

Ballistic performance
Bullet mass/type	Velocity	Energy
76 gr (5 g) FMJ	830 ft/s (250 m/s)	116 ft⋅lbf (157 J)
- Source: "Textbook of Automatic Pistols"

The .35 Smith & Wesson (S&W) is an obsolete centerfire pistol cartridge developed in 1912 for the newly designed Model 1913 self-loading pocket pistol.

== Description ==
The .35 S&W Automatic intended to compete with the Colt Model 1903 Pocket Hammerless .32 ACP and Model 1908 .380 ACP pistols. The .35 caliber name implied a cartridge of diameter directly between those two popular calibers. In reality, actual bullet diameters were .312 for the .32 ACP and the .35 S&W, and .355 for the .380 ACP. As such, the .35 S&W Auto is actually an 8mm round instead of a 9mm round as the name implies. Smith & Wesson named it as such so as to not be confused with the similarly sized .32 ACP. Despite possible reliability problems, .35 S&W pistols can fire .32 ACP ammunition.

The bullets are rather unusual with a full diameter un-jacketed lead-alloy surface enclosed within the case, and a sub-caliber jacket encasing the exposed nose with a rounded form for reliable loading. The .35 S&W failed to catch on for a couple of reasons. One reason is that the advanced features of the Model 1913 failed to compensate for the earlier availability of the Colt pistols. Gun purchasers were also skeptical about a non-standard cartridge when .32 ACP ammunition was widely available, as at the time it was one of the most popular pistol cartridges in the world. The .35 S&W Auto also did not perform as well ballistically as the .32 ACP that it was trying to compete with. When introduced in 1913, the S&W .35 pistol was priced 10% higher than the established Colt and Savage models in .32acp. The S&W sold for $16.50, the Colt and Savage sold for $15.00. This may have held sales back as well as the .32acp was already a well respected handgun round.

Approximately 8,350 Model 1913 had been made when production stopped about 1921. Smith & Wesson shifted production to their Model 32 self-loading pistol chambered for the .32 ACP from 1924 to 1937. No other firearms were chambered for the .35 S&W, and the cartridge is considered obsolete, and ammunition is rare and highly collectible.
