= Smith & Wesson Model 1913 =

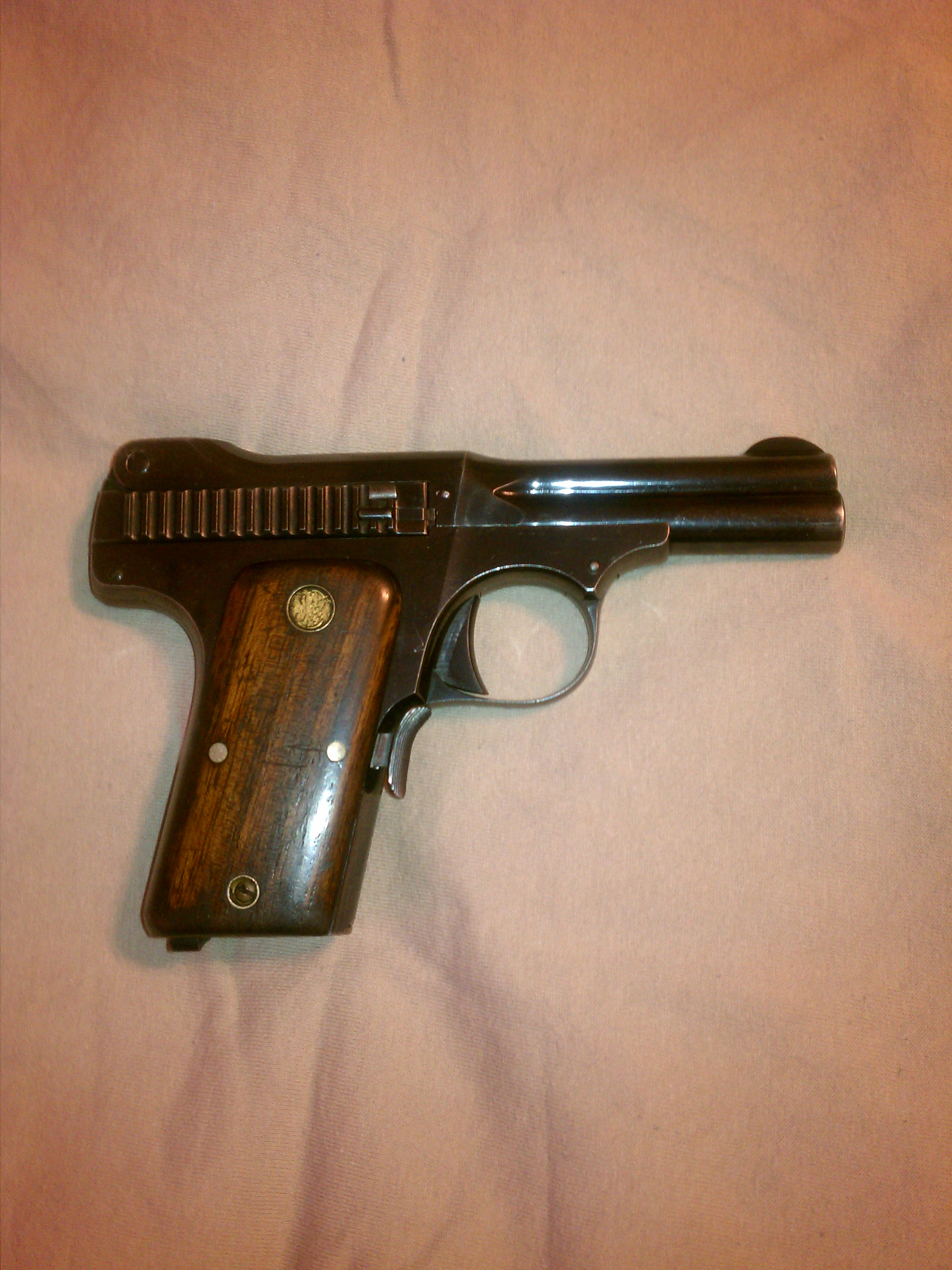
- Smith & Wesson Model 1913
- Type: Semi-automatic pistol
- Place of origin: Belgium

Production history
- Designer: Charles Philibert Clement
- Manufacturer: Smith & Wesson
- Unit cost: $16.50
- Produced: 1913–1921
- No. built: 8,350

Specifications
- Mass: 22 oz (620 g)
- Length: 6.5 in (170 mm)
- Barrel length: 3.5 in (89 mm)
- Caliber: .35 S&W Auto
- Action: Blowback-operated autoloader
- Feed system: 7-round magazine
- Sights: Round blade front; groove in barrel assembly rear

The Smith & Wesson Model 1913 is a center fire semi-automatic pistol introduced by Smith & Wesson in 1913. This pistol was also known as the "Model 35".

== Design ==
The Model 1913 was produced from 1913 to 1921, and approximately 8,350 were built. The Model 1913 was chambered in the now obsolete .35 S&W Auto cartridge. It featured smooth wooden grip panels, a fully grooved slide with crossbolt lock stud, and an ambidextrous safety that was operated with the middle finger of the shooting hand.

== History and engineering changes ==
The Model 1913 was the first semi-automatic produced by Smith & Wesson. It generally followed a design introduced by Charles Philibert Clement in 1903 initially chambered for the 5mm Clement and after 1906 for the .25 ACP.

- First Type—The grip safety was operated by pressing it to the rear.
- Second Type—The grip safety was redesigned so that it had to be pushed to the left and rearward.
- Third Type—The grip safety was changed back to the original style of operation.
- Fourth Type—The magazine catch was redesigned.
- Fifth Type—Used a heavier recoil spring and wider slide cross bolt lock.
- Sixth Type—The shape of the recoil spring channel was changed, and the sides of the slide were extended so they overlapped the sides of the frame.
- Seventh Type—The S&W stamp on the frame flat behind the grip was discontinued.
- Eighth Type—The caliber markings were moved from the left side of the barrel to the right, and the left was marked "Smith & Wesson."

Model 1913s were used by agents of the Bureau of Investigation, the forerunner to the FBI. According to retired agent Roy McHenry, he was unofficially issued a “.35 Smith and Wesson automatic” by Bureau of Investigation Assistant Chief Albert Pike in 1917.
