= List of cartridges by caliber =

Calibers in the size range of (mm, inches):

- 2 mm (.079+ caliber)
- 3 mm (.118+ caliber)
- 4 mm (.157+ caliber)
- 5 mm (.197+ caliber)
- 6 mm (.236+ caliber)
- 7 mm (.276+ caliber)
- 8 mm (.315+ caliber)
- 9 mm (.354+ caliber)
- 10 mm (.394+ caliber)
- 11 mm (.433+ caliber)
- 12 mm (.472+ caliber)
- 13 mm (.511+ caliber)

== See also ==
- Table of handgun and rifle cartridges

By name

- List of Winchester Center Fire cartridges
- Winchester Short Magnum
- Winchester Super Short Magnum
- Remington Ultra Magnum
- ICL cartridges
