= .17 Remington =

Rifle cartridge

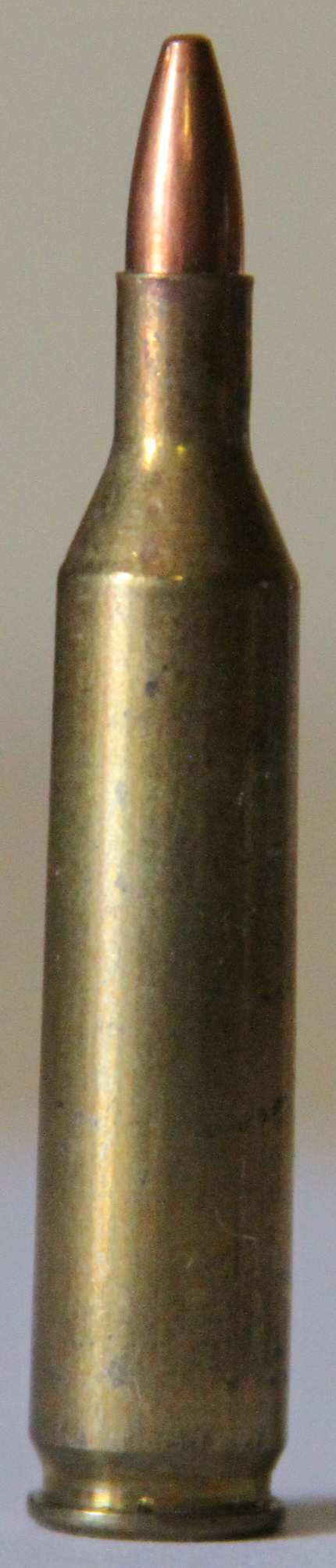
- Type: Hunting (varmint)
- Place of origin: USA

Production history
- Designer: Remington
- Designed: 1971
- Manufacturer: Remington
- Produced: 1971
- Variants: 17-222/17-223

Specifications
- Parent case: .223 Remington/.222 Remington
- Case type: Rimless, bottleneck
- Bullet diameter: .172 in (4.4 mm)
- Land diameter: .168 in (4.3 mm)
- Neck diameter: .199 in (5.1 mm)
- Shoulder diameter: .356 in (9.0 mm)
- Base diameter: .376 in (9.6 mm)
- Rim diameter: .378 in (9.6 mm)
- Rim thickness: .045 in (1.1 mm)
- Case length: 1.796 in (45.6 mm)
- Overall length: 2.150 in (54.6 mm)
- Rifling twist: 1971-1972 (1:10) 1973–present (1:9)
- Primer type: Small rifle
- Maximum CUP: 52,000 CUP

Ballistic performance
Bullet mass/type	Velocity	Energy
15.5 gr (1 g) BT	4,917 ft/s (1,499 m/s)	874 ft⋅lbf (1,185 J)
20 gr (1 g) BT	4,436 ft/s (1,352 m/s)	874 ft⋅lbf (1,185 J)
25 gr (2 g) HP	4,123 ft/s (1,257 m/s)	944 ft⋅lbf (1,280 J)
30 gr (2 g) HP	3,839 ft/s (1,170 m/s)	982 ft⋅lbf (1,331 J)
20 gr (1 g) Hornady V-Max	4,200 ft/s (1,300 m/s)	784 ft⋅lbf (1,063 J)
- Sources: Hodgdon Norma, C.I.P. Hodgdon

The .17 Remington / 4.4x45mm is a rifle cartridge introduced in 1971 by Remington Arms Company for their model 700 rifles.

== Overview ==
The .17 Remington is based on the .223 Remington case necked down to .172 in (4.37 mm), with the shoulder moved back .087 in (2.2 mm).

Extremely high initial velocity (over 4,000 ft/s 1,200 m/s), flat trajectory and very low recoil are the .17 Remington's primary attributes. It has a maximum effective range of about 440 yards (400 m) on prairie dog-sized animals, but the small bullet's poor ballistic coefficients and sectional densities mean it is highly susceptible to crosswinds at such distances.

The smaller .172 bullet typically has a much lower ballistic coefficient than other typical varmint calibers, such as that of the .223 Remington. Because of this, the .172 bullet loses velocity slightly sooner and is more sensitive to wind; but by no means does this render the cartridge useless. The tiny entrance wound and usual lack of exit wound on coyote-sized animals make it an ideal round for fur bearing animals from which the hunter intends to collect a pelt. A significant disadvantage is the rapid rate at which such a small-caliber rifle barrel can accumulate gilding metal fouling, which is very detrimental to accuracy and may also eventually result in increasing pressures caused by the fouling's constriction of the bore. Many .17 Remington shooters have reported optimum accuracy when the bore is cleaned after every 10 - 20 shots, though more modern metallurgy used in both barrels and bullets has largely mitigated the fouling issue.

The .17 Remington is also one of the few cartridges in which powder charge weight is often greater than bullet weight. Though this condition has been known to degrade accuracy, the .17 Remington is noted for exceptional accuracy.

== Dimensions ==
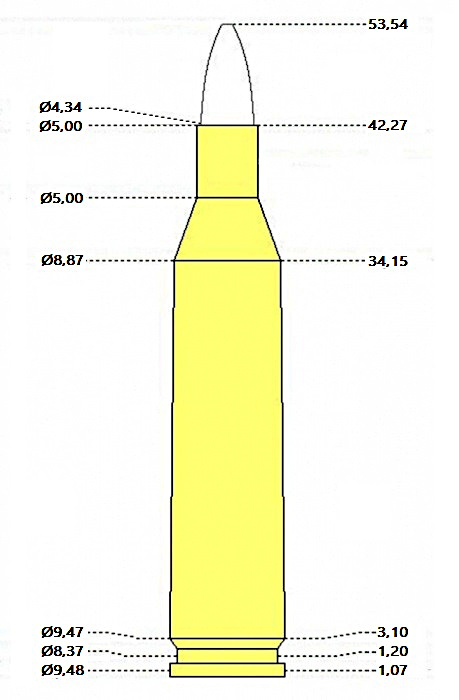

== Gallery ==
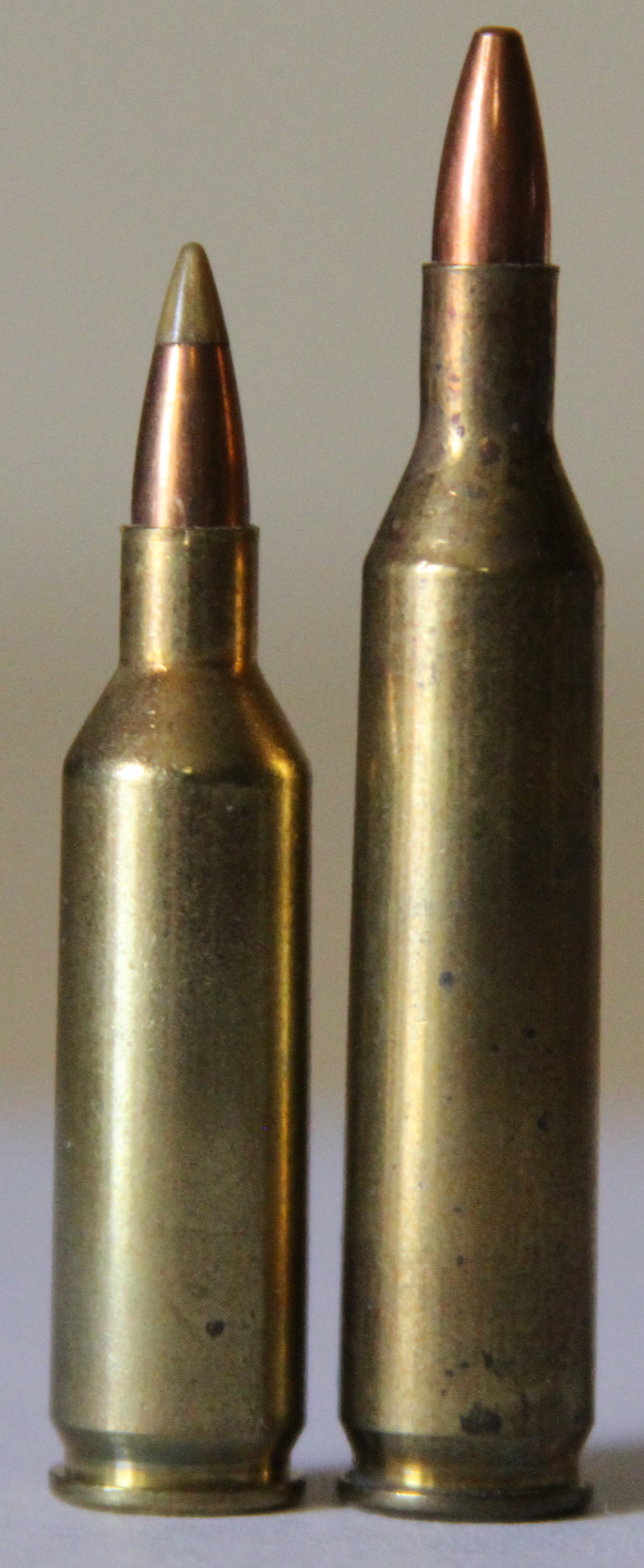
A .17 Remington Fireball cartridge next to a .17 Remington cartridge

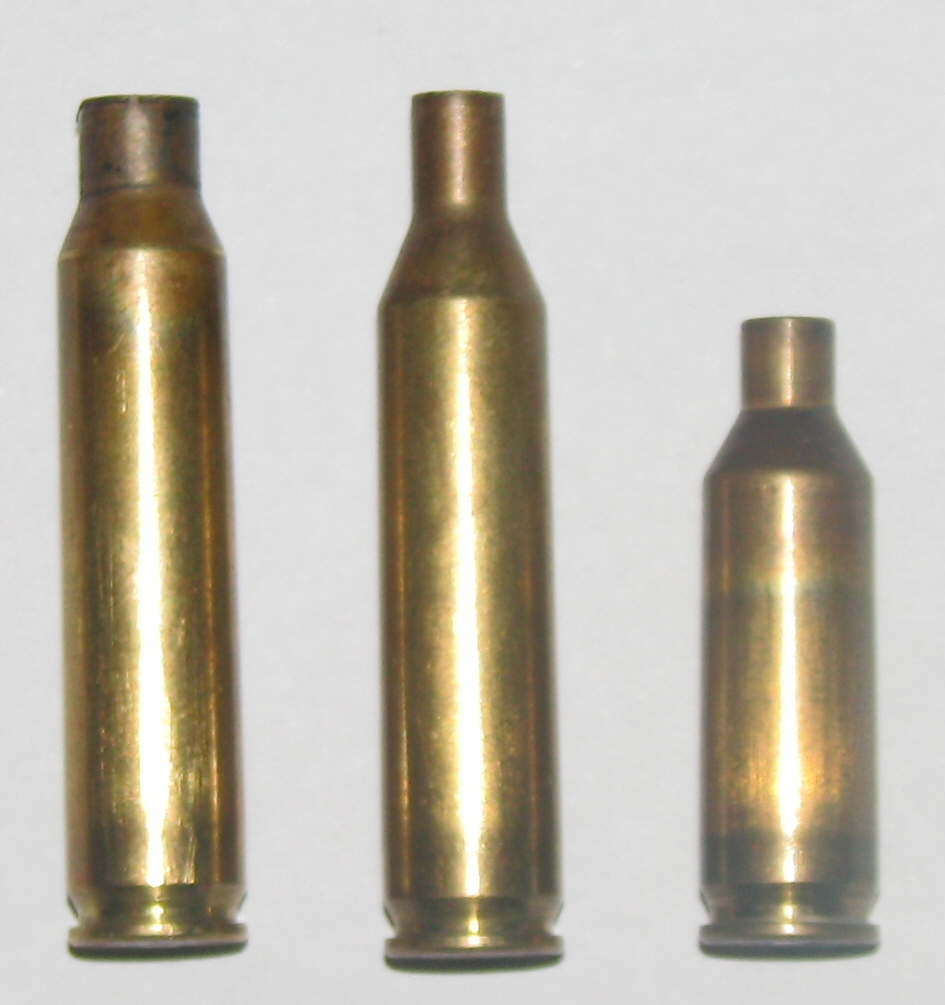
Left to right - .223 Rem, .17 Rem, .17 Fireball

== See also ==
- 4 mm caliber
- .17 Ackley Bee
- .17 Hornet
- .17 Remington Fireball
- Delta L problem
- List of rifle cartridges
- Sectional density
- Table of handgun and rifle cartridges
