= .204 Ruger =

American centerfire rifle cartridge

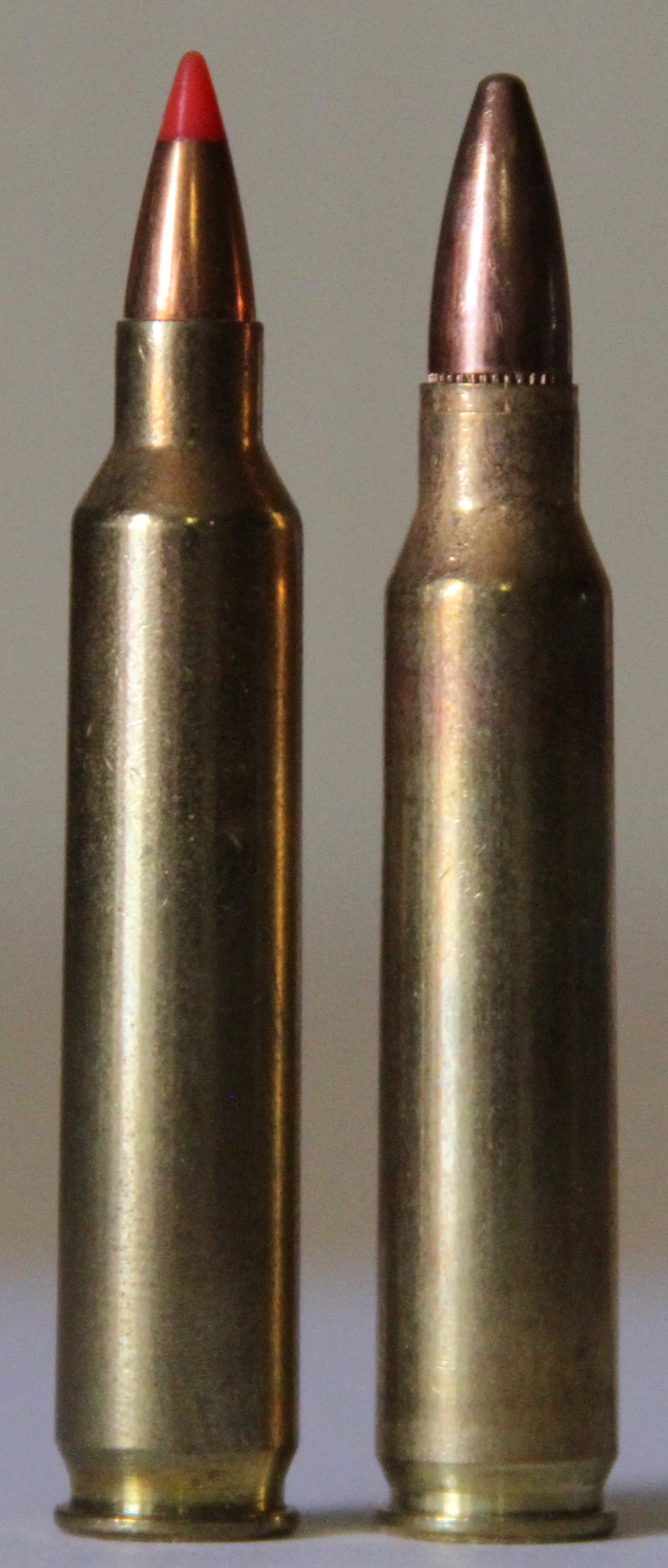
- A .204 Ruger cartridge (left) compared to .223 Remington (right)
- Type: Rifle
- Place of origin: United States

Production history
- Designer: Ruger/Hornady
- Designed: 2004
- Produced: 2004–present

Specifications
- Parent case: .222 Remington Magnum
- Case type: Rimless, bottleneck
- Bullet diameter: .204 in (5.2 mm)
- Neck diameter: .2311 in (5.87 mm)
- Shoulder diameter: .3598 in (9.14 mm)
- Base diameter: .3764 in (9.56 mm)
- Rim diameter: .378 in (9.6 mm)
- Rim thickness: .0449 in (1.14 mm)
- Case length: 1.850 in (47.0 mm)
- Overall length: 2.2598 in (57.40 mm)
- Rifling twist: 1-12
- Primer type: Small rifle
- Maximum pressure: 62,000 psi (430 MPa)

Ballistic performance
| Bullet mass/type | Velocity | Energy |
|---|---|---|
| 32 gr. (2.1 g) BT | 4,225 ft/s (1,288 m/s) | 1,268 ft⋅lbf (1,719 J) |
| 40 gr. (2.6 g) BT | 3,900 ft/s (1,200 m/s) | 1,351 ft⋅lbf (1,832 J) |
| 45 gr. (2.9 g) SP | 3,625 ft/s (1,105 m/s) | 1,313 ft⋅lbf (1,780 J) |
| 40 gr. (2.6 g) Hornady V-Max, Norma | 3,806 ft/s (1,160 m/s) | 1,195 ft⋅lbf (1,620 J) |
| 24 gr. (1.55 g) Hornady Super Performance varmint ammunition | 4,400 ft/s (1,341 m/s) | 1,032 ft⋅lbf (1,399 J) |
- Source: Hornady Norma

The .204 Ruger / 5.2x47mm is a centerfire rifle cartridge developed by Hornady and Ruger. At the time of its introduction in 2004, the .204 Ruger was the second-highest velocity commercially produced ammunition and the only centerfire cartridge produced commercially for bullets of .204 inch/5 mm caliber.

== Characteristics ==
The .204 Ruger was developed from the .222 Remington Magnum, which has the second-largest case capacity in the family that began with the .222 Remington. Only the European 5.6×50mm Magnum is larger, which itself is a lengthened version of the .222 Remington Magnum. The .222 Remington Magnum provides about 5% more usable (below the neck) case capacity than the most popular member of the family, the NATO 5.56×45mm (.223 Remington). To make the .204 Ruger, the .222 Remington Magnum case was necked down to .204 inches (5 mm) and its shoulder moved forward and angle increased to 30 degrees. Bullets available in .204 caliber range from 24-to-57-grain (1.6 to 3.7 g) with the most common bullet weights being between 30-to-50-grain (1.9 to 3.2 g). The Hornady factory load is listed at 4,225 ft/s (1288 m/s) with a 32-grain (2.1 g) bullet. To achieve these velocities, the factory uses a proprietary powder composition known internally as SMP746, specially formulated by Primex, and, as of 2013, not available to handloaders. The propellant features a de-coppering agent (bismuth pellets) that helps prevent fouling. Reloading data from Hornady, using commercially available powders, indicate velocity peaking at just under 4,200 ft/s (1,300 m/s) with the 32-grain (2.1 g) bullet in longer barrels.

== Development ==
The .204 Ruger was the second Ruger-named cartridge produced by a partnership between Ruger and Hornady, the first being the big bore .480 Ruger revolver cartridge introduced in 2003 for the Super Redhawk. With the backing of a major gunmaker and a major ammunition company, the round was an instant success, with other ammunition makers and firearms makers quickly adding the new chambering. Ruger's initial offerings included the bolt action Model 77 MKII, and the single shot Ruger No. 1, and Hornady offered loadings with 30-and-40-grain (1.9 and 2.6 g) bullets.

The .204 Ruger has proven to be a very accurate and efficient cartridge: an early tester reported 1/2 MOA groups at 100 yards (91 m) with the Hornady loads and a Ruger No. 1 varmint rifle. The first cartridge in the family, the .222 Remington, was a top benchrest shooting cartridge for many years after its introduction.

The .204 Ruger was intended primarily for varmint rifles, which require bullets with flat trajectories but not much mass or kinetic energy. The .204 was "splitting the difference" between the popular .224 caliber rounds such as the .220 Swift and .22-250 Remington, and the .172 caliber rounds such as the .17 Remington and the .17 HMR. The resulting cartridge provides somewhat higher velocities than any of these, giving a maximum point blank range of more than 270 yards (250 m).

== Velocity ==
Ruger's claim to being the velocity king with the .204 was based on two points.

First, no other high-performance .20 caliber cartridge was commercially produced. Second, the ammunition used to achieve the 4,225 ft/s (1,288 m/s) was available only from Hornady using a special powder not available to the general public.

Handloaders typically achieve velocities more in the area of 4,100 ft/s (1,200 m/s) using a 32-grain (2.1 g) bullet. Handloads using 40-grain (2.6 g) bullets in other commercial cartridges such as the .22-250 Remington also achieve velocities similar to those of the .204 Ruger. The advantage of the .204 Ruger is that it achieves these velocities with less powder, less recoil, and less heat than the larger cartridges. The .204 Ruger has a maximum range of approximately 500 yards (460 m). Hornady now offers a 24-grain (1.6 g) lead free cartridge that claims 4,400 ft/s (1,300 m/s) from a 26-inch (660 mm) barrel. However, Hornady's 35-grain (2.3 g) NTX .22-250 claims 4,450 ft/s (1,360 m/s) from a 24-inch (610 mm) barrel.

| .204 Ruger 32 GR V-MAX 83204 | Muzzle | 100 yds | 200 yds | 300 yds | 400 yds | 500 yds |
|---|---|---|---|---|---|---|
| Velocity/energy (ft/s) / (ft-lbs) | 4,225/1,268 | 3,645/944 | 3,137/699 | 2,683/512 | 2,272/367 | 1,899/256 |
| Trajectory (inches) | -1.5 | 0.6 | 0.00 | -4.1 | -13.1 | -29.0 |

| .204 Ruger 40 GR V-MAX 83206 | Muzzle | 100 yds | 200 yds | 300 yds | 400 yds | 500 yds |
|---|---|---|---|---|---|---|
| Velocity/energy (ft/s) / (ft-lbs) | 3,900/1,351 | 3,482/1,077 | 3,103/855 | 2,755/674 | 2,433/526 | 2,133/404 |
| Trajectory (inches) | -1.5 | 0.7 | 0.00 | -4.3 | -13.2 | -28.1 |

| .204 Ruger 45 GR SP 83208 | Muzzle | 100 yds | 200 yds | 300 yds | 400 yds | 500 yds |
|---|---|---|---|---|---|---|
| Velocity/energy (ft/s) / (ft-lbs) | 3,625/1,313 | 3,188/1,015 | 2,792/778 | 2,428/589 | 2,093/438 | 1,787/319 |
| Trajectory (inches) | -1.5 | 1.0 | 0.0 | -5.5 | -16.9 | -36.3 |

== See also ==
- 5mm/35 SMc
- List of rifle cartridges
- Table of handgun and rifle cartridges
