= .17 Ackley Bee =

Rifle cartridge

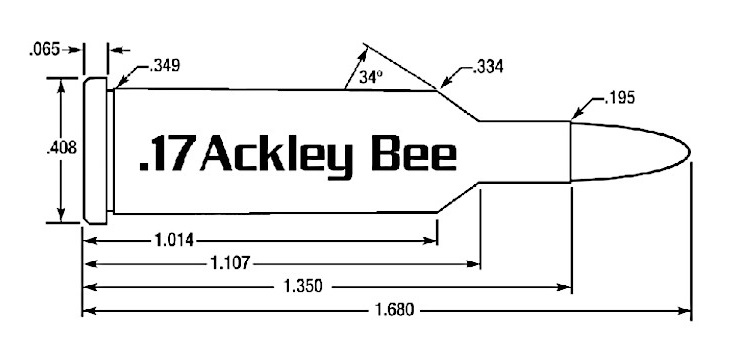
- Type: Rifle
- Place of origin: United States

Production history
- Designer: P.O. Ackley
- Designed: 1940s

Specifications
- Parent case: .218 Bee
- Case type: Rimmed, bottleneck
- Bullet diameter: 0.172 in (4.4 mm)
- Neck diameter: 0.195 in (5.0 mm)
- Shoulder diameter: 0.334 in (8.5 mm)
- Base diameter: 0.349 in (8.9 mm)
- Rim diameter: 0.408 in (10.4 mm)
- Rim thickness: .065 in (1.7 mm)
- Case length: 1.35 in (34 mm)
- Case capacity: 16.89 gr H_{2}O (1.094 cm^{3})
- Rifling twist: 1-12 inches
- Primer type: Small rifle

Ballistic performance
| Bullet mass/type | Velocity | Energy |
|---|---|---|
| 20 gr (1 g) HP | 3,845 ft/s (1,172 m/s) | 657 ft⋅lbf (891 J) |
| 25 gr (2 g) SP | 3,285 ft/s (1,001 m/s) | 599 ft⋅lbf (812 J) |
- Source: Reload Bench

The .17 Ackley Bee is a wildcat centerfire rifle cartridge named after its designer, P.O. Ackley, and is a .218 Bee case necked down to .17 caliber with a sharper shoulder and less body taper. Being a rimmed case, it was popular in single shot rifles such as the Martini Cadet and Low Wall Winchester. The caliber is well suited to varmint hunting particularly where minimal pelt damage is required.

== See also ==
- 4 mm caliber
- .25-20 Winchester
- List of rifle cartridges
