= 2 mm caliber =

Firearm cartridge classification

- Firearm cartridges
- « ~~1 mm~~ 2 mm 3 mm »

This article lists firearm cartridges which have a caliber in the 2.00 to 2.99 millimetres (0.079 to 0.118 in) range.

All measurements are in mm (in).

== 2 mm cartridges ==
All dimensions are given in mm (in).

Name	Bullet diameter	Neck	Shoulder	Rim	Base	Case length	Overall length
2 mm pinfire	?	?	?	?	?	?	?
2.34mm rimfire	2.34 (.092)	?	?	2.8 (.110)	?	6.1 (.240)	9.13 (.359)
.10 Eichelberger Long Rifle	2.6 (.103)	3.1 (.122)	5.7 (.223)	7.0 (.275)	5.7 (.225)	14.4 (.568)	?
.10 Eichelberger Pup	2.6 (.103)	3.1 (.122)	6.3 (.247)	7.8 (.308)	6.3 (.249)	19.5 (.767)	?
.10 Eichelberger Squirrel	2.6 (.103)	3.1 (.122)	7.4 (.291)	8.9 (.350)	7.4 (.291)	15.6 (.613)	?
2mm Kolibri	2.7 (.107)	3.5 (.139)	N/A	3.6 (.140)	3.6 (.140)	9.4 (.370)	10.9 (.430)
