= .221 Remington Fireball =

Pistol and rifle cartridge

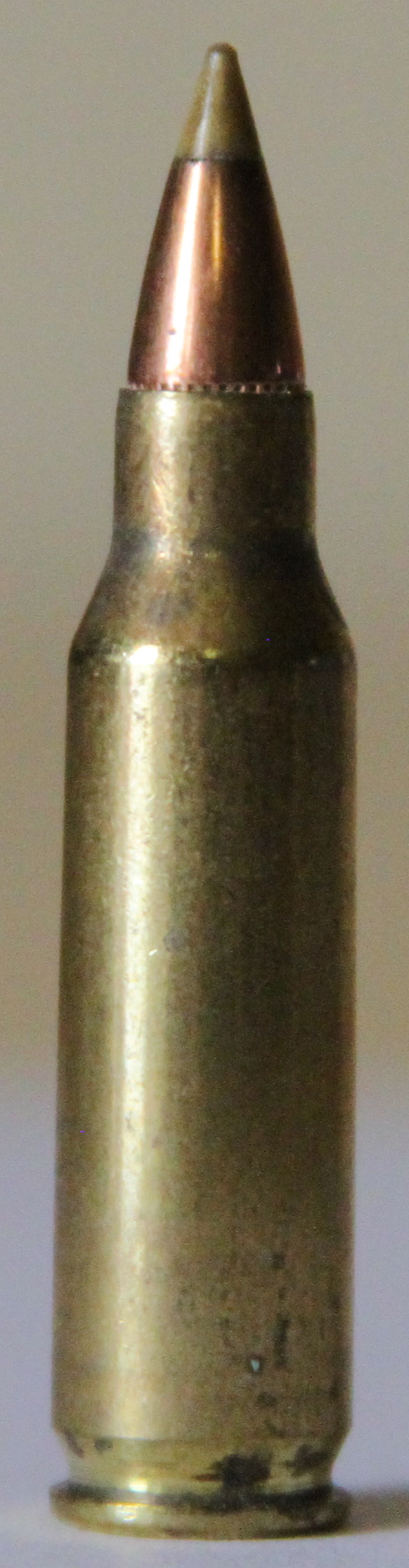
- Type: Pistol / Rifle
- Place of origin: United States

Production history
- Designer: Remington / Wayne Leek
- Manufacturer: Remington
- Produced: 1963

Specifications
- Parent case: .222 Remington
- Case type: Rimless, bottleneck
- Bullet diameter: .224 in (5.7 mm)
- Neck diameter: .253 in (6.4 mm)
- Shoulder diameter: .361 in (9.2 mm)
- Base diameter: .376 in (9.6 mm)
- Rim diameter: .378 in (9.6 mm)
- Rim thickness: .045 in (1.1 mm)
- Case length: 1.400 in (35.6 mm)
- Overall length: 1.830 in (46.5 mm)
- Rifling twist: 1-12 in (300 mm)
- Primer type: Small rifle
- Maximum CUP: 52,000 CUP

Ballistic performance
Bullet mass/type	Velocity	Energy
45 gr (3 g) SP – Pistol	2,947 ft/s (898 m/s)	868 ft⋅lbf (1,177 J)
50 gr (3 g) SX – Pistol	2,813 ft/s (857 m/s)	879 ft⋅lbf (1,192 J)
55 gr (4 g) SBT – Pistol	2,700 ft/s (820 m/s)	891 ft⋅lbf (1,208 J)
45 gr (3 g) SP – Rifle	3,203 ft/s (976 m/s)	1,025 ft⋅lbf (1,390 J)
55 gr (4 g) SBT – Rifle	2,950 ft/s (900 m/s)	1,063 ft⋅lbf (1,441 J)
- Test barrel length: 14 in (360 mm), 24 in (610 mm); Source: Accurate Powder

The .221 Remington Fireball (5.7×35mm), often simply referred to as .221 Fireball, is a centerfire cartridge developed by Remington Arms Company in 1963 as a special round for use in their experimental single-shot bolt-action pistol, the XP-100. It is a shortened version of the .222 Remington and is popular for varmint and small predator hunting, as well as among target shooters. The .221 Fireball is used in both pistols & rifles.

== History ==
In the early 1960s Remington was working on an experimental bolt-action pistol based on their Model 600 action. The goal was a highly accurate pistol that would be well suited for competition. After working with the .222 Remington they determined that it contained more powder capacity than was necessary to work efficiently in the shorter barrels of pistols. While rifle barrels commonly range in length from 14.5 to 26 in (37 to 66 cm), pistol barrels are typically much shorter, ranging from 2 to 12 in (5.1 to 30.5 cm) although occasionally up to 16 in (41 cm) for some competition barrels. As a result, Remington decided to develop a shorter version of the .222 Remington cartridge, optimized for use in the XP-100.

While production of XP-100 pistols chambered in .221 Fireball was eventually canceled after 1985, Thompson Center Arms produced various single-shot pistols chambered for the .221 Fireball as part of their Contender and Encore models. Rifles chambered for the .221 Fireball include the Remington 700 and the Ceska zbrojovka CZ 527.

== Performance ==
Despite its smaller size, the .221 Fireball is capable of velocities nearly equal to that of the .222 Remington largely due to its higher SAAMI pressure. The maximum SAAMI pressure level for the .221 Fireball is 52,000 C.U.P. as compared to 46,000 C.U.P. for the .222 Remington. The purpose of the increased pressure was to allow it to perform more effectively in the shorter barrel of the XP-100.

The .221 Fireball produces the highest velocity of any commercial pistol cartridge.

== Offshoots ==
The .221 Fireball has been used by wildcatters to create a small efficient .17 caliber cartridge. The most common is the .17 Mach IV which is essentially the .221 necked down to the smaller caliber. This cartridge is reported to have a very flat trajectory and to be relatively quiet with low recoil. It has been so popular as a wildcat that in 2007 Remington legitimized it by introducing their version only slightly different from the Mach IV and calling it the .17 Remington Fireball. A .20 caliber version is also gaining popularity called the .20 VarTarg (VT), "vartarg" being the combination of the words "varmint" and "target". The .221 Fireball has also been used as the base for the .300 Whisper, sometimes referred to as the .300/.221 or .300 Fireball. It is also the basis for other cartridges in J.D. Jones' Whisper family including the 6 mm Whisper, which has been adopted by Knight's Armament Corporation for their Knight's Armament Company PDW as the 6×35mm PDW.

== Gallery ==
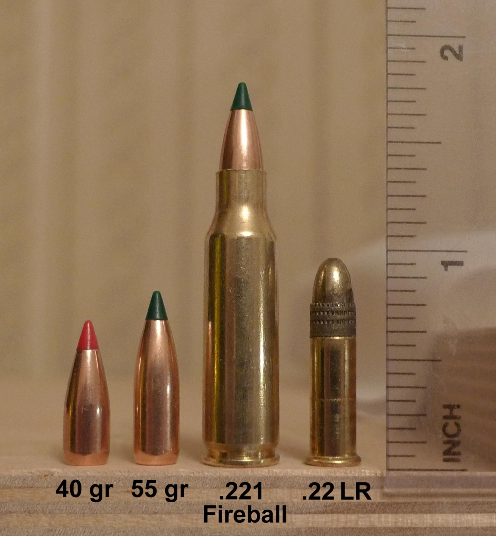
L-R: 40 gr Hornady V-Max, 55 gr Sierra BlitzKing, .221 Remington Fireball, .22 LR Remington Golden Bullet

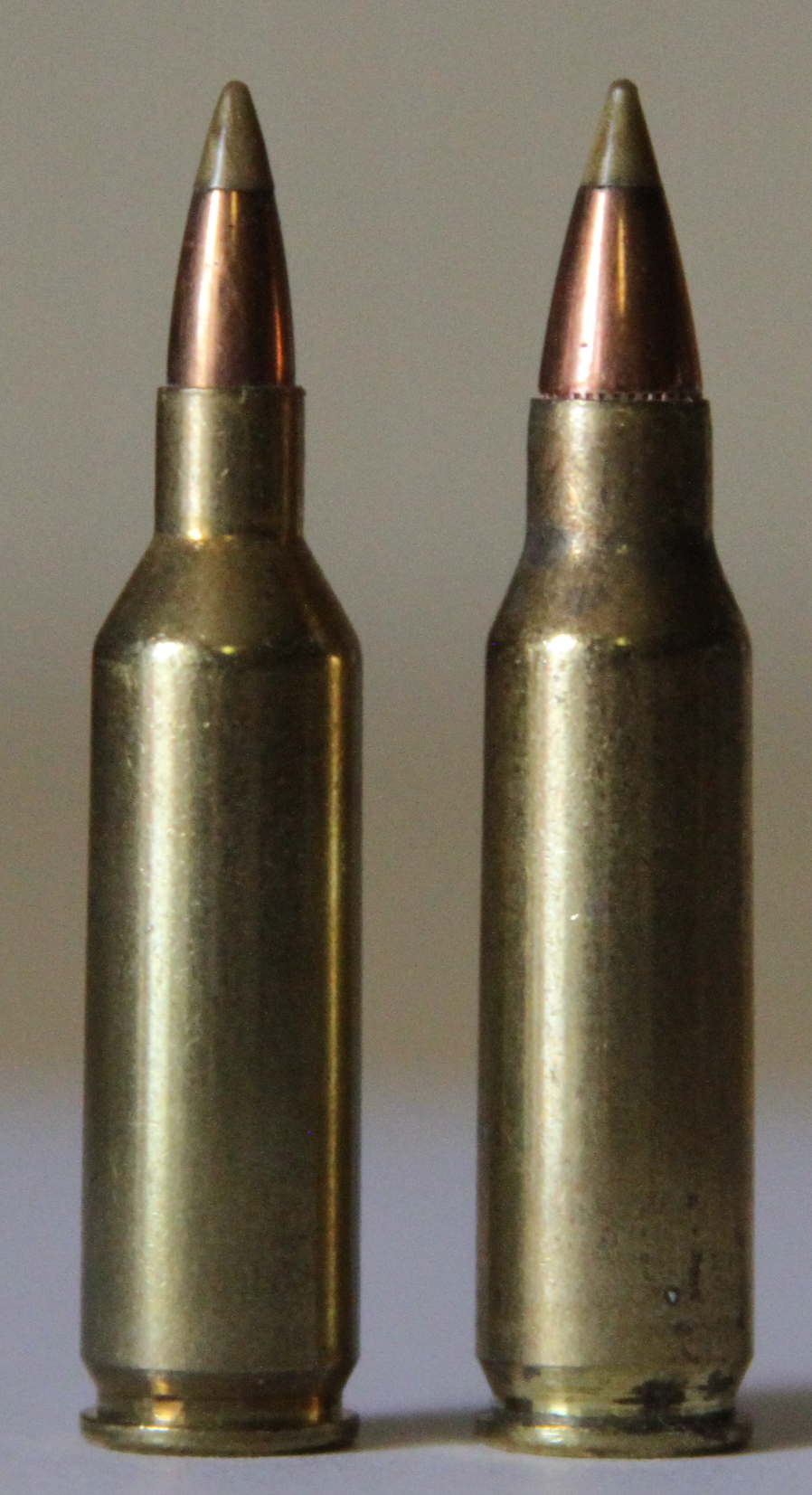
.17 Remington Fireball next to its parent case, the .221 Remington Fireball.

== See also ==
- .22 Remington Jet
- .22 Spitfire, a similar .22 caliber centerfire cartridge
- 5 mm caliber
- List of rifle cartridges
- Table of handgun and rifle cartridges
