= .21 Sharp =

Rifle cartridge

- Type: Rifle
- Place of origin: United States

Production history
- Designer: Winchester Ammunition
- Designed: 2024
- Manufacturer: Winchester Ammunition
- Produced: 2024–present

Specifications
- Parent case: .22 Long Rifle
- Case type: Rimmed, straight wall
- Bullet diameter: .2105 in (5.35 mm)
- Neck diameter: .226 in (5.7 mm)
- Base diameter: .226 in (5.7 mm)
- Rim diameter: .278 in (7.1 mm)
- Rim thickness: .043 in (1.1 mm)
- Case length: 0.613 in (15.6 mm)
- Overall length: 0.965 in (24.51 mm)
- Rifling twist: 1 in 12 in (300 mm)
- Primer type: Rimfire
- Maximum pressure (SAAMI): 24,000 psi (170 MPa)

Ballistic performance
Bullet mass/type	Velocity	Energy
25 gr (2 g) Game & Target 25 grain, Copper Matrix	1,750 ft/s (530 m/s)	170 ft⋅lbf (230 J)
37 gr (2 g) Game & Target 37 grain, Black Copper Plated	1,335 ft/s (407 m/s)	146 ft⋅lbf (198 J)
42 gr (3 g) Game & Target 42 grain, FMJ	1,330 ft/s (410 m/s)	165 ft⋅lbf (224 J)
34 gr (2 g) Super X® 34 grain, JHP	1,500 ft/s (460 m/s)	170 ft⋅lbf (230 J)
- Test barrel length: 24 in Source: SAAMI

The .21 Sharp, is a SAAMI-standardized rimmed straight wall rifle cartridge standardised by Winchester Ammunition.

== History ==
.21 Sharp was announced in September 2024 by Winchester Ammunition and was released in 2024. Initial factory loads for the .21 Sharp include a variety of bullet types such as jacketed hollow point, copper‑plated, full metal jacket and lead‑free copper matrix options, demonstrating a broader selection than traditional .22 LR ammunition at launch.

== Design ==
The cartridge was designed to shoot a copper jacketed bullet using a .22 LR case as some jurisdictions ban lead bullets. Winchester marketed the .21 Sharp as offering improved accuracy and reduced felt recoil compared to standard .22 LR ammunition, highlighting its appeal for small‑game hunting and precision shooting.

== See also ==
- List of rifle cartridges
- .22 Long Rifle
