= 5mm Clement =

Spanish centerfire pistol cartridge

- Type: Pistol
- Place of origin: Spain

Production history
- Designer: Clement
- Designed: 1897
- Produced: 1898–1938

Specifications
- Case type: Semi-rimmed, bottleneck
- Bullet diameter: .2 in (5.1 mm)

Ballistic performance
Bullet mass/type	Velocity	Energy
28 gr (2 g) FMJ	1,030 ft/s (310 m/s)	65 ft⋅lbf (88 J)
- Source(s): "Textbook of Automatic Pistols"

The 5mm Clement is a centerfire cartridge was designed in 1897 and produced for early self-loading pocket pistols such as the 1897 Spanish Charola-Anitua pistol and the 1903 Belgian Clement pistol. The steeply conical, bottle-necked case is semi-rimmed, but headspaces on the shoulder of the case. The long bullet was inadequately stabilized and tended to tumble in flight. The Charola-Anitua pistol was produced in very limited numbers, and Clement pistol production shifted to the .25 ACP cartridge after 1906.
