= 5.6×50mm Magnum =

German centerfire rifle cartridge

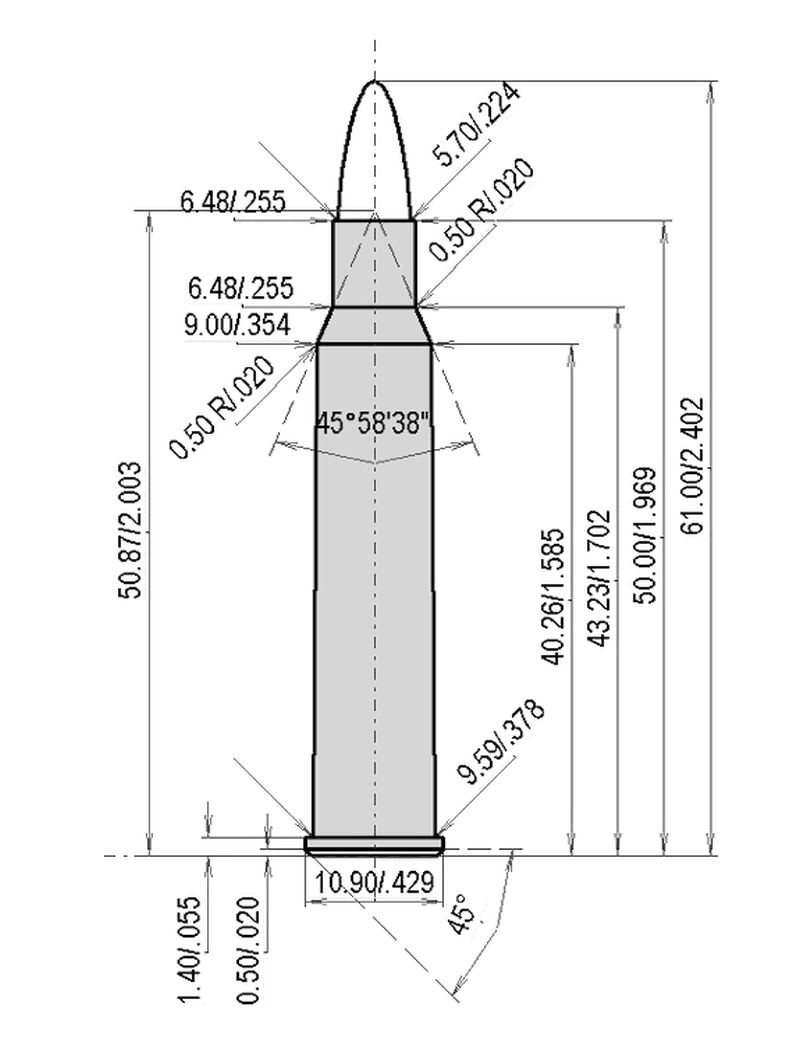
- 5.6×50mm Magnum dimensions
- Type: Rifle
- Place of origin: West Germany

Production history
- Designer: Günter Frères
- Designed: 1970

Specifications
- Parent case: 5.6×50mmR (Rimmed, 1968)
- Case type: Rimless, bottleneck
- Bullet diameter: 5.70 mm (0.224 in)
- Land diameter: 5.56 mm (0.219 in)
- Neck diameter: 6.48 mm (0.255 in)
- Shoulder diameter: 9.00 mm (0.354 in)
- Base diameter: 9.56 mm (0.376 in)
- Rim diameter: 9.60 mm (0.378 in)
- Rim thickness: 1.14 mm (0.045 in)
- Case length: 50.00 mm (1.969 in)
- Overall length: 61.30 mm (2.413 in)
- Rifling twist: 350 mm (1 in 13.77 in)
- Primer type: Small rifle
- Maximum pressure: 380.00 MPa (55,114 psi)

Ballistic performance
Bullet mass/type	Velocity	Energy
3.2 g (49 gr) SP	1,100 m/s (3,600 ft/s)	1,840 J (1,360 ft⋅lbf)
3.6 g (56 gr) SP	1,000 m/s (3,300 ft/s)	1,800 J (1,300 ft⋅lbf)
3.9 g (60 gr) SP	980 m/s (3,200 ft/s)	1,840 J (1,360 ft⋅lbf)
4.1 g (63 gr) RWS TMS	920 m/s (3,000 ft/s)	1,735 J (1,280 ft⋅lbf)
- Source(s): Cartridges of the World

The 5.6×50mm Magnum (designated as the 5,6 × 50 Mag. by the C.I.P.) is a centerfire, rimless, bottlenecked rifle cartridge that was developed in 1970 by Günter Frères of the Deutsche Waffen und Munitionsfabriken (DWM).

== Parent case ==
In 1968, Günter Frères developed the parent case, the rimmed 5.6×50mmR Magnum (designated 5,6 x 50 R Mag. by the C.I.P. According to the official C.I.P ruling, the rimless 5.6×50mm Magnum can handle up to 380.00 MPa (55,114 psi) P_{max} piezo pressure, which is 40.00 MPa (5,802 psi) more than the rimmed parent case developed four years prior.

== Uses ==
The 5.6×50mm Magnum and 5.6×50mmR Magnum cartridges were developed in Germany as legal hunting cartridges for small game, fox, chamois and roe deer at ranges up to and over 200 m (219 yd). In North America it is considered a varmint hunting cartridge.

== See also ==
- List of rifle cartridges
- 5 mm caliber
