= Wildcat cartridge =

Custom cartridge for firearms

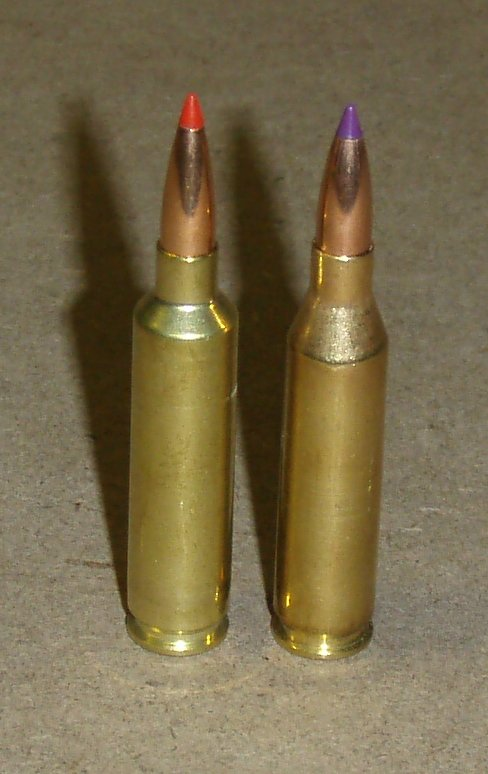
.243 Winchester Ackley Improved (left) and .243 Winchester (right)

A wildcat cartridge, often shortened to wildcat, is a custom-made cartridge for which ammunition and/or firearms are not mass-produced. These cartridges are often created as experimental variants to optimize a certain ballistic performance characteristic (such as the power, size, or efficiency) of an existing commercial cartridge, or may merely be intended as novelty items.

Developing and using wildcat cartridges does not generally serve a purpose in military or law enforcement; it is more a hobby for serious sport shooting, hunting, gunsmithing and handloading enthusiasts, particularly in the United States. There are potentially endless varieties of wildcat cartridge: one source of gunsmithing equipment has a library of over 6,000 different wildcat cartridges for which they produce equipment such as chamber reamers.

== Development of a wildcat ==
Often, wildcats are commercially sold rounds that have been modified in some way to alter the cartridge's performance. Barrels for the caliber are originally manufactured by gunsmiths specializing in barrel making. Generally, the same makers also offer reloading dies, tools to custom-load bullets into cases. Because changing the barrel of a gun to accommodate custom cartridges requires precision equipment, most wildcats are developed by or in association with custom barrel makers. Ammunition is handloaded, using modified parent cases and the gunsmith-provided wildcat dies. Generally, the supplier of the barrel or dies will also provide the buyer with basic reloading data, giving a variety of powders, charge weights, and bullet weights that can be used for developing loads. Handloaders use the data to develop a load by starting with minimum loads and carefully working up.

Wildcat cases and cartridges can be found for sale, but only from small makers. Larger manufacturers usually do not produce wildcats because there is such a limited market for them and because there are no established CIP or SAAMI standards, which causes liability concerns.

== Wildcat goals and methods ==
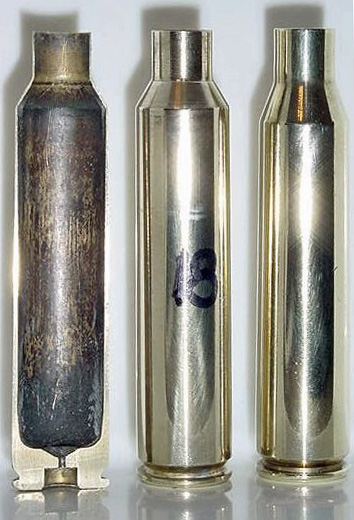
From left to right: cross-sectioned and normal .338 Yogi wildcat cartridge cases compared to a factory .338 Lapua Magnum case.

Wildcat cartridges are developed for many reasons. Generally, the goal is to optimize some characteristics of a commercial cartridge in a given context. Higher velocities, greater energy, better efficiency, greater consistency (which yields greater precision), and complying with a minimal permitted caliber or bullet weight for the legal hunting of certain species of game in a particular jurisdiction are the top reasons. The sport of metallic silhouette shooting, has given rise to a great number of wildcats, as several rifle rounds are adapted to fire from a handgun. In using autopistols for hunting or competitive shooting, improved feeding of softnose or hollowpoint bullets is also an issue; the bottlenecked .45/38, for instance, was created because the straight-cased .45 ACP had trouble feeding hollow points.

Wildcat cartridges are generally developed because:

- Higher velocities can be obtained by increasing the case capacity or reducing the projectile weight, usually with smaller calibers.
- Greater energy can be attained by increasing the caliber or the case capacity.
- Better efficiency can be achieved by increasing the shoulder angle, shortening the case, and reducing the case taper (see internal ballistics).
- Greater consistency can be achieved by tuning the case capacity to a certain bullet diameter, weight, and velocity that give consistent results.
- Feeding problems can be fixed.

Some methods used to develop a wildcat are:

- Cold forming. The parent case is well lubricated and forced carefully into the reloading die for the wildcat caliber. This will swage the case into a new shape. This type of operation is used for reducing case dimensions, such as changing the neck diameter or pushing the shoulder back.
- Fire forming. This consists of taking the parent case, or a partially cold formed case, loading it with a light bullet and light load of powder, and firing it in the firearm it will be used in. Another technique uses a charge of fast-burning powder topped with a case full of Cream of Wheat and a wad, to form a special blank cartridge that will expand the case. This technique is used for increasing case dimensions, such as pushing the neck forward, increasing the neck angle, or straightening the case walls.
- Trimming to length. Generally, after either a cold forming or a fire forming operation, the mouth of the case will be longer than ideal, and the case will be trimmed back to the "trim to" length. Trimming is a normal reloading operation, as high-pressure cartridges will flow each time they are fired, and periodically need trimming to remove the brass that flows to the mouth.
- Changing the diameter of the case (to suit a new caliber). Called "necking up" or "necking down", this is the most common way of making a wildcat. The new caliber allows a different range of bullet weights, and can greatly increase the velocity or the power or the resistance to wind drift as compared to the parent cartridge.
- Necking back. This is a cold forming operation in which the neck is pushed back to reduce case capacity. This is often done when developing rounds for shorter barrels, such as turning a rifle cartridge into a handgun cartridge.
- Blowing out. This is a fire-forming operation that moves the shoulder forward to increase case capacity.
- Changing the shoulder angle. By making the shoulder closer to square, the resulting space is closer to the ideal spherical shape, resulting in a more efficient burn. If the shoulder is also to be moved back, this is a cold forming operation; if the shoulder is to stay or be moved forward, it is a hot forming operation.
- Reducing the case taper. This hot forming operation makes the cartridge more cylindrical, giving similar results to a shoulder angle change.
- Changing the rim. While this is a wildcatting operation, it is generally only done by commercial operations, due to the precision turning needed. Generally, this is a conversion from rimmed to a rimless cartridge, or from rimless to rebated, and is done to allow a larger parent case than the firearm action was designed for. The opposite operation, adding a rim to a case, is also generally only done by major manufacturers; examples are the .45 Auto Rim, a rimmed .45 ACP allowing ejection in .45 revolvers without the use of moon clips, and the .307 Winchester, a rimmed .308 Winchester, developed for use in lever-action rifles. A handloader can add a rim, by swaging a ring of metal onto a rimless case, then turning it down, but this is a very labor-intensive process and requires a special swaging die and precision metalworking lathe. It is far easier for most handloaders to simply start with a rimmed case, either of the desired diameter or reamed out as desired.
- Increasing the case length. This process (which allows the cartridge to contain more propellant and thus increases the potential energy of the bullet) was used to make the powerful .357 Magnum cartridge from the much weaker .38 Special: A .357 magnum bullet has more than 3 times more energy than a .38 special bullet of the same weight. Increasing the length of a bullet's case usually involves getting rid of the old case and making a completely new one from scratch, which all but limits the feasibility of this kind of modification for commercial manufacturers. It is possible to draw an existing case into a slightly longer form, thinning and stretching the existing case, but this is an operation requiring special equipment and expertise. It is far easier and more common to reduce, not extend the length of a case.

== Example wildcat cartridges ==
In terms of sheer numbers of varieties, there are more wildcat cartridges than there are production cartridges. Most wildcats are custom made, therefore are not generally well-known. Some wildcat cartridges, however, are produced commercially in small quantities by small manufacturers. This is a list of some representative wildcats.

- .30 Herrett. Based on the .30-30 Winchester, necked back and with a sharper shoulder angle. Developed for use in pistols with barrels as short as 10 inches (25 cm), it develops the same power as a .30-30 with greater efficiency and less muzzle blast.
- .357 Herrett. Like the earlier .30 Herrett, this cartridge is based on the .30-30 Winchester, shortened and necked up to .357 (9 mm). Designed for use in short barrels, the resulting cartridge is more efficient and more powerful than the .30-30. Often considered one of the best medium game hunting calibers available in the 10" (25 cm) barrelled Thompson Center Arms Contender pistol.
- .10 Eichelberger Long Rifle. This is one of a smaller number of wildcats based on rimfire cartridges. It is made by disassembling a .22 Long Rifle cartridge, and re-using the case. The .10 caliber (2.5 mm) is the smallest rifled barrel made. The tiny .10 caliber bullets produce almost no recoil and travel at very high velocities. While it can be used on small game at short ranges, this cartridge is more of a curiosity than practical hunting or target round.
- 5.7 MMJ, or 5.7mm Spitfire. A .30 Carbine case necked down to .223 caliber (5.56 mm), this cartridge was developed to convert military surplus M1 Carbines into short range varmint guns.
- 6mm PPC. Based on the .220 Russian, which is in turn based on the 7.62×39mm intermediate-power cartridge. The 6mm PPC was developed in 1975 specifically for benchrest shooting. While it is anything but common anywhere else, the 6mm PPC unseated the .222 Remington from its 20-year spot as the best benchrest cartridge available. Chambered only in single-shot rifles due to its short, fat case and sharp shoulder angle, the 6mm PPC is still going strong in benchrest after 30 years.
- .22 Eargesplitten Loudenboomer. This humorously named cartridge was developed by P. O. Ackley specifically to exceed 5,000 ft/s (1,500 m/s) muzzle velocity. Based on a .378 Weatherby Magnum case, the case is impractically overpowered for the bore diameter, and so the cartridge remains a curiosity.
- 7 mm TCU (also known as 7TCU). Based on the .223 Remington case, the 7 mm TCU is popular in single-shot handguns such as the Thompson Center Arms' Contender and G2 Contender. It is but one of a family of wildcat TCU cartridges.

=== Wildcat cartridges in Australia ===
In Australia, wildcat cartridges were relatively common. Most are made primarily for hunting species such as deer, kangaroo, and are generally based on the .303 British because of the post-war popularity of that round and of the cheap surplus Australian Lee–Enfield MkIII military rifles available. Many of these surplus rifles were re-barreled to .257 caliber, known as the 303-25. One of the unique features is that these cartridges relied less on handloading - and instead, factory ammunition was produced by the Super Cartridge Company, Riverbrand, IMI, and Sportco.

Since having an existing barrel rebored and rechambered was (at that time) less expensive than fitting a new barrel, a 303-25 rifle with a worn-out barrel could be economically converted to .277 caliber, known as the 303-270.

The .222 Remington - a .222 Rimmed in a Martini was also commonly found. As too were the "Tini-Mite" and "Mini-Mite" cartridges, .17 caliber rimfire cartridges based on the .22 Long Rifle case.

=== Commercially accepted wildcats ===
Some cartridges started out as custom-made (non-commercially developed) wildcats and gained wide enough acceptance or popularity to become commercial cartridges. Generally, cartridges become popular commercially after a commercial firearms maker begins offering a weapon chambered in the cartridge. Once popular enough, funding is generated for SAAMI standards development. After SAAMI standards are in place, any firearms or ammunition maker can be sure that any products manufactured to the SAAMI standards can be safely used.

Some examples of custom cartridges that became commercially accepted are:

- .22-250. Based on a .250 Savage case, the .22-250 is still one of the fastest shooting .22 caliber (5.56 mm) cartridges available. First offered in a factory firearm by Browning in 1963 (the first factory gun chambered for a wildcat), the .22-250 was later adopted by Remington as the .22-250 Remington.
- .22 CHeetah. A .308 BR (Bench Rest) case necked down to .22 caliber, the .22 CHeetah provides a flat trajectory with a .22 caliber bullet that has a relatively high speed of 4,000 ft/s. Hard on barrels, it provides a very effective 300-yard varmint round.
- .303/25. A .303 British cartridge necked down to fire a .25 caliber projectile, developed in Australia during the 1940s as a Kangaroo culling and pest control round. Popularised in the late 1940s and 1950s in New South Wales, owing to restrictions in that state on ownership of .303 British caliber firearm and the difficulties of obtaining commercial hunting arms and ammunition from overseas. Now largely obsolete, but there are still large numbers of converted Lee–Enfield rifles chambered for this round in Australia.
- 6.8 mm SPC. This cartridge was developed by American military special operations soldiers in search of a more lethal round than the 5.56×45mm NATO. It is based on the .30 Remington cartridge necked down to .270 caliber, and sized to fit in the M16 rifle.
- 7 mm-08. A .308 Winchester necked down to 7 mm (.284 caliber), the 7 mm-08 provides a flatter trajectory with lighter, more aerodynamic 7 mm bullets.
- 7-30 Waters. Designed to improve the performance of lever-action rifle designs dating back to the 1890s, the 7-30 Waters is a .30-30 Winchester necked down to 7 mm (.284 caliber). Even with the lower chamber pressures allowed by the lever-action rifle and the flat-tipped bullets necessitated by the tubular magazines, the 7-30 Waters offers a significant gain in velocity and sectional density with little loss in bullet weight. This cartridge has also developed a following among handgun hunters using single-shots such as the T/C Contender or G2, which can take advantage of spitzer (pointed) bullets that are unsafe in tubular magazines. It is very efficient on small to medium-sized game including whitetails and mule deer.
- .454 Casull. This magnum revolver cartridge, a lengthened .45 Colt, was developed by Dick Casull and Jack Fulmer in 1957 as a high-powered big game hunting round. For many years, the small Wyoming manufacturer Freedom Arms was the only substantial maker of guns for the cartridge. In the mid-1990s, two major manufacturers, Ruger and Taurus, started selling guns chambered in .454 Casull because it was popular due to its extreme power. It was finally commercialized in 1997 when SAAMI published its first standards for the cartridge.

=== Commercially developed wildcats ===
Though a cartridge technically has to not be developed commercially to be considered a wildcat, some commercial cartridges were developed by ammunition and firearm manufacturers by modifying existing cartridges – using essentially the same process used to make wildcats. Cartridges that are modified by being made longer (usually to make them more powerful) are for the most part only created commercially because of the difficulty of the process. One example of such a cartridge is the .357 Magnum, which was developed from the .38 Special in 1934 by firearms manufacturer Smith & Wesson.

- .38-40. One of the oldest wildcats, the .38-40, introduced by Winchester Repeating Arms Company in 1874, was made by necking down a .44-40. Actually a .401 in (10.2 mm) cartridge, the .38-40 had faded into obsolescence before being revived with the growing popularity of Cowboy action shooting. The ballistics of the .38-40 are close to those of the .40 S&W.
- .221 Fireball. This cartridge was developed by Remington Arms for the XP-100 pistol, which was a single shot bolt action pistol. The .221 Fireball was a necked back .222 Remington, designed for greater efficiency in the 10 in (25 cm) barrel of the XP-100. Even loaded with a smaller load of faster powder for the short barrel, the .221 Fireball lived up to its name, with a massive muzzle flash; the performance, however, was unheard of for its day: over 2700 feet per second (885 m/s) out of the short XP-100 barrel. It remains the fastest SAAMI-approved handgun cartridge, and the cartridge is so efficient and accurate that it has been chambered in rifles as well.
- .22 Remington Jet. This cartridge was developed by Remington for a Smith & Wesson Model 53 revolver and a Marlin Model 62 lever-action rifle, but the rifle was never produced in this caliber. The .22 Remington Jet was a necked-down .357 Magnum case with an unusually long case shoulder. The .22 Jet is no longer manufactured by Remington or other commercial manufacturers.
- .357 SIG. This now-popular pistol cartridge was developed by Swiss weapons company SIG Sauer in an attempt to produce ballistics matching the powerful .357 Magnum revolver load, but in a semi-automatic pistol cartridge. The cartridge was made by necking down and slightly stretching the .40 S&W case, which itself derived from the 10mm Auto.
- .400 Corbon. This cartridge was designed to produce 10mm Auto ballistics in a cartridge that could be chambered in a .45 ACP pistol with a simple barrel swap. It was made by necking a .45 ACP down to .40 (10 mm). Initially, no firearms were available in .400 Cor-Bon, but barrels in the new caliber were produced for the M1911 pistol.
- .41 Action Express. Developed in 1986 by Action Arms for the Jericho 941 pistol. It, like the .357 SIG, attempted to make a magnum-power cartridge for a semi-automatic pistol. It started with a .41 Magnum case and cut it down to fit in a semi-automatic pistol chambered for 9×19mm. The rim was then turned down to the same dimensions as the 9×19mm, making it a rebated rim cartridge. This allowed a unique switch up to a larger caliber. The .41 AE never saw huge commercial success because of the creation of the similarly powerful .40 S&W in 1990.
- .204 Ruger. Introduced in 2004 by Ruger, in its time it held the title of fastest production cartridge with a velocity of 4225 ft/s (1290 m/s) with a 32-grain (2.1 g), .204 bullet from a 24-inch (610 mm) barrel. Intended as a varmint rifle cartridge, the .204 was based on the .222 Remington Magnum, which is slightly longer than the .223 Remington and offers about 5% more case capacity. Designed to have a very long point blank range, the factory loading offers impressive ballistics, placing a 32gr Hornady V-Max bullet 1.96 inches high at 150 yards (140 m), and 2 inches (51 mm) low at 300 yards (270 m).

=== Second (and later) generation wildcats ===
Some wildcats are based not on commercial rounds, but on other successful wildcats. The .308 × 1.5" Barnes, a wildcat from noted cartridge author Frank Barnes made by simply necking a .308 Winchester back to 1.5 inches (38 mm) in length (38.1 mm) is probably the best example of a wildcat that has spawned many other successful wildcats. The .308 x 1.5" case is available from a number of case manufacturers and differs from a homemade .308 x 1.5" in that it has a small primer pocket, whereas the original .308 Winchester case has a larger primer pocket (the smaller primer is more suited to the smaller case capacity of the short round). There are at least 8 wildcats that are made from the small primer .308 x 1.5" brass, including some very successful benchrest rounds, including the Benchrest Remington family of cartridges, .22 BR, 6mm BR, 6.5mm BR, 7mm BR, .30 BR.

Another example is the .220 Russian, based on the 7.62×39mm. Since nearly all 7.62×39mm ammunition made in the 1970s used the complex-to-reload Berdan priming, and often steel cases, it made a poor choice for wildcatting. The .220 Russian, however, was and still is readily available in Boxer-primed, brass cases of high quality. The .220 Russian is still the parent cartridge of choice for the PPC line of cartridges, such as the .22 PPC and 6mm PPC, even though there are far more PPC-chambered firearms available than .220 Russian chamberings. Likewise, the PPC line of cartridges were the parent case of the 6.5 Grendel, a long-range, high-energy cartridge for the AR-15.

== See also ==
- Small arms ammunition pressure testing
- Overpressure ammunition
- List of rebated rim cartridges
- C.I.P., an international (mainly European) standardization organization for firearm cartridges
- SAAMI, an American standardization organization for firearm cartridges
- NATO EPVAT testing
- DEVA, a German firearms test institute

=== Notable wildcat cartridges ===
- Whisper (cartridge family), proprietary cartridges by J. D. Jones
- .30-06 Springfield wildcat cartridges
- List of wildcat cartridges
