= Pao An Tui =

Self-defense force of the Chinese-Indonesian community during the Indonesian Revolution

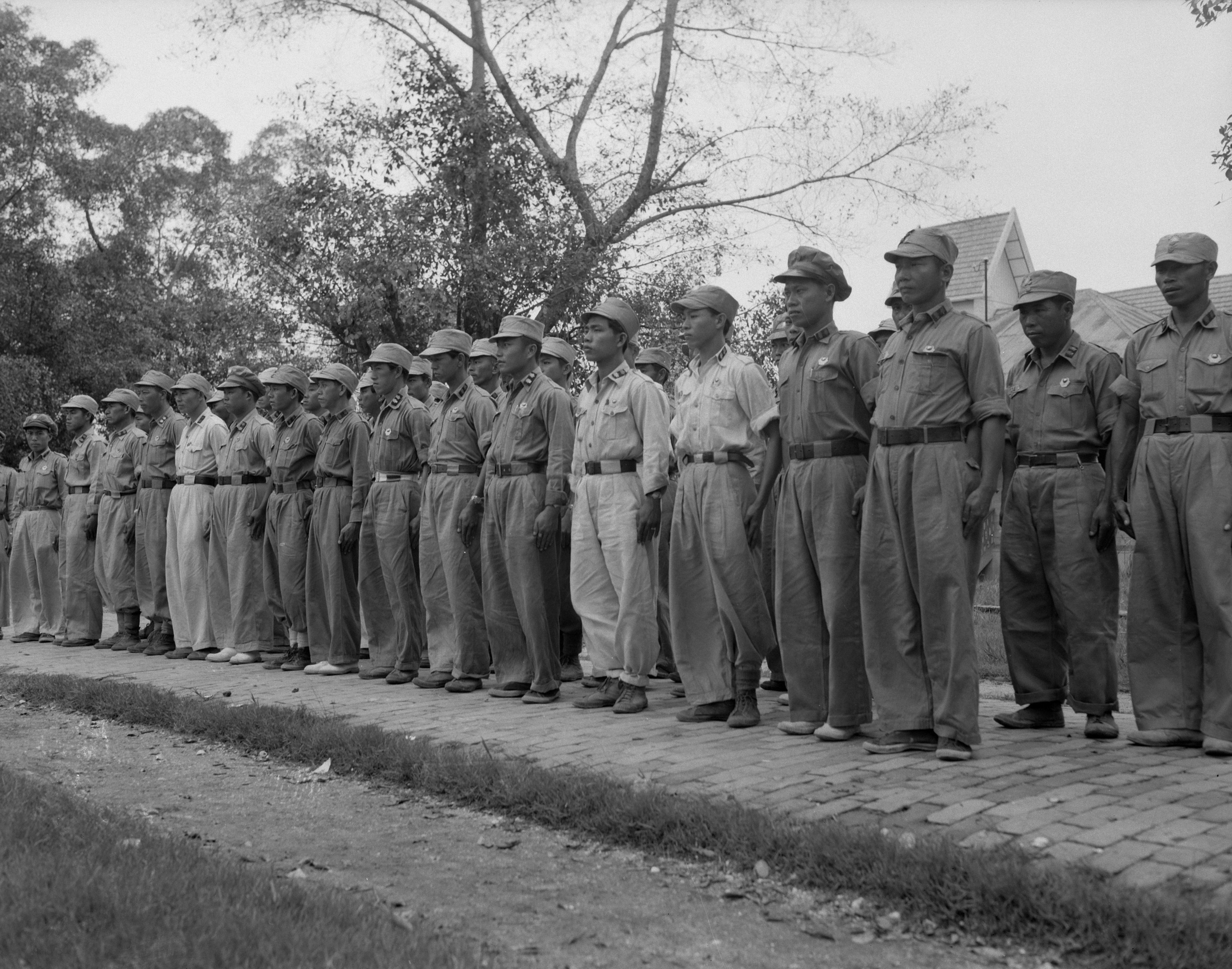
- Pao An Tui emblem Pao An Tui in Bagansiapiapi
- Other name: Poh An Tui, Po An Tui, Poh An Tuy, Po An Tuy
- Leaders: Loa Sek Hie (Chairman); Oey Kim Sen (Deputy Chairman); Khouw Joe Tjan (Secretary); Cong Fai-kim (Treasurer)
- Dates active: 1946-1949
- Headquarters: Batavia, Dutch East Indies
- Active regions: Parts of Java, Sumatra, Borneo
- Wars: Indonesian National Revolution

Pao An Tui
- Traditional Chinese: 保安隊
- Simplified Chinese: 保安队
Transcriptions
Standard Mandarin
- Hanyu Pinyin: Bǎo'ān duì
- Wade–Giles: Pao^{3}-an^{1} tui^{4}
- IPA: [pàʊ ân.twêɪ]
Southern Min
- Hokkien POJ: Pó-an-tūi

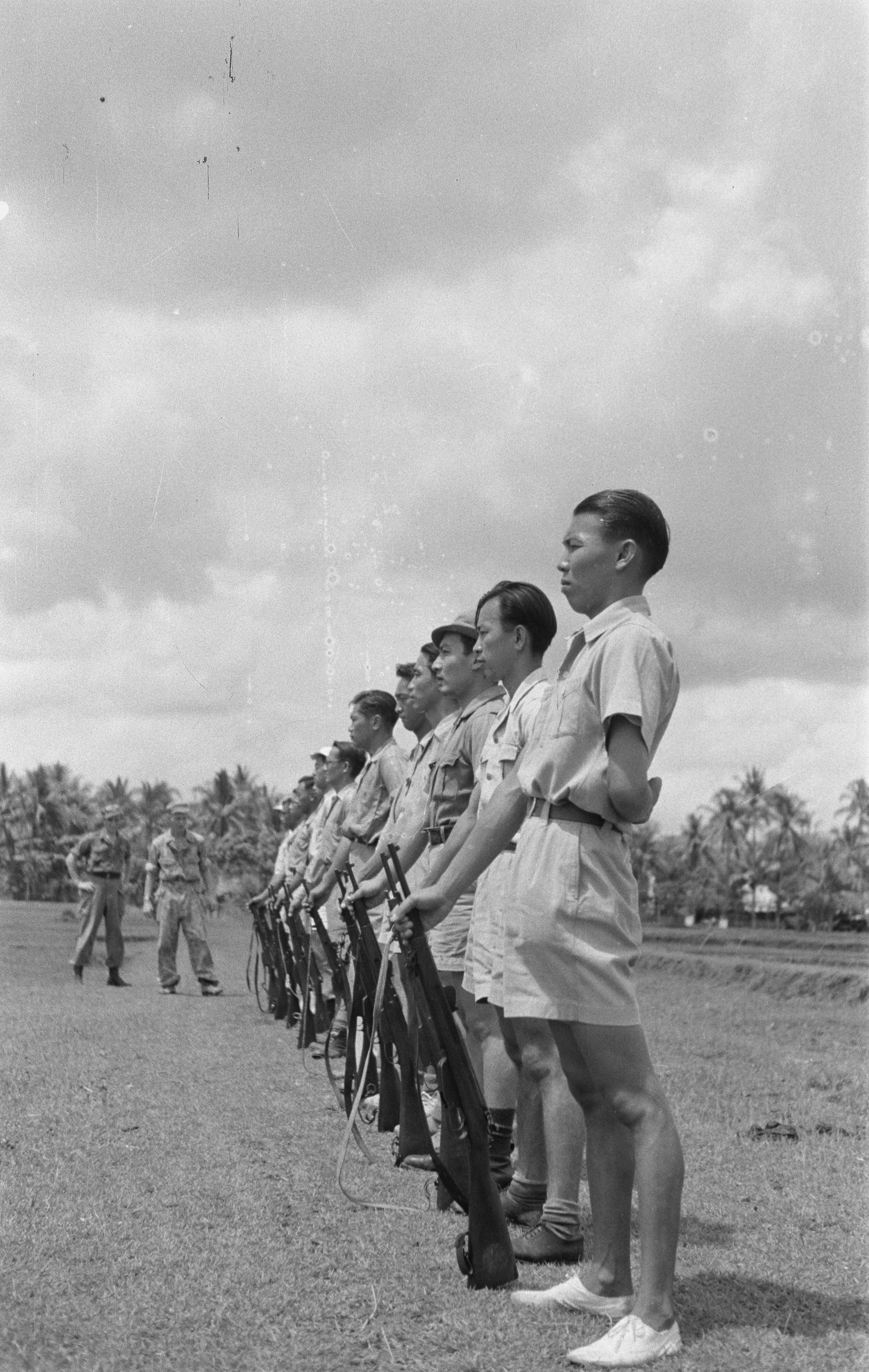
Pao An Tui recruits in Bandung

Pao An Tui (Chinese: 保安隊; pinyin: Bǎo'ān duì; Wade–Giles: Pao^{3}-an^{1}-tui^{4}; Pe̍h-ōe-jī: Pó-an-tūi; lit. ''public security corps'') sometimes spelt Po An Tui or Poh An Tui from the Hokkien pronunciation, were self-defense forces of the Chinese-Indonesian community during the Indonesian National Revolution from 1945 to 1949. The group has been accused by Indonesian nationalists of harboring pro-Dutch sympathies during the Revolution, especially during the Police Actions, though it received arms and support from both sides of the conflict. Pao An Tui was disbanded in 1949 with the cessation of violence and the conclusion of the revolution in Indonesian Independence.

== History ==
In order to address the disorder and violence against and by Chinese-Indonesians during the Indonesian National Revolution, the Foreign Affairs Ministry of the Republic of China to the Netherlands declared a memorandum on 25 July 1946 concerning efforts to curb disproportionate violence against the Chinese minority in Indonesia. On 31 July 1947 the then Vice Minister of Foreign Affairs George Yeh declared a statement of grave concern over repeated murder and arson against Chinese by Indonesian pro-Independence troops despite declarations of neutrality by the diaspora.

An overseas Chinese association Chung Hua Tsung Hui hosted a conference August 24 until August 26, 1947, in Batavia, the capital of colonial Dutch East Indies, modern Indonesia. The conference resulted, in the official formation of Pao An Tui on August 29, 1947, headquartered in Batavia. The Central Committee consisted of Loa Sek Hie (chairman), Oey Kim Sen (deputy chairman), Khouw Joe Tjan (Secretary) and Cong Fai-kim (Treasurer), and claimed jurisdiction over all Pao An Tui units. Units were then created in Medan, North Sumatra in 1946, then in Java in 1947.

In response, the leader of Dutch Forces, Lt.Gen Spoor declared decision No. 516, stating the bounds allowed for the Pao An Tui to operate as following:

1. The responsibilities of the Pao An Tui is only to protect Chinese lives and property in Java and Sumatra.
2. The primary headquarters of the Pao An Tui must be in Batavia, however regional sub-headquarters are permitted, and its members will be restricted to Chinese-Indonesians only.
3. (Reiterating) The responsibilities of the Pao An Tui in various places is only to protect Chinese factories, companies, buildings, storage houses, and housing.
4. The Pao An Tui will not take part in policing, unless told to by Dutch authorities.

The force claimed neutrality during the revolution, receiving support for its establishment from Sutan Sjahrir, first Prime Minister of revolutionary Indonesia, and initial arms and training from the pro-Dutch Allied forces. The Pao An Tui were disbanded in 1949 with the conclusion of the revolution in Indonesian Independence.

In practice, the Pao An Tui worked to secure Chinese-Indonesian communities, communicating with both pro-Independence and Dutch forces to enable a continuation of economic activity by indigenous, Chinese, Arab, and Dutch traders, along with maintaining security in different times and places alongside NICA, BKR, or KNIL, among other military, paramilitary, or police forces from both sides of the conflict. In those instances too, Indonesian or Dutch flags were flown alongside the nationalist Republic of China flags by the Pao An Tui in their regional headquarters.

== Reception ==
While opinions varied within the republican movement, with figures such as Sutan Sjahrir supporting the idea, the Indonesian revolutionary government, suspecting the force of pro-Dutch sympathies, refused to extend its formal recognition until 1948. In a press conference in Singapore on 20 October 1947, the then foreign minister Agus Salim declared.

"From all the incidents, it seems like the Ethnic Chinese suffer the most from the scorched earth policies by the republic forced upon by the military actions of the Netherlands. However, if we understand Indonesia we realize that in places such as Malang and Surabaya, the Chinese are the ones who own buildings, and later if there were destruction, surely only Chinese will face the damages. We absolve ourselves, because we see that the damage on the Chinese properties and a small number of Indonesian (indigenous) properties suffer from the same type of damage, their Indonesian and Chinese owners suffering much the same."

Within the Chinese community, the Pao An Tui largely were accepted as a necessary measure to protect the Chinese diaspora, especially garnering diplomatic support from the nationalist Kuomintang government of Chiang Kai Shek. However, this closeness with the nationalist government and the Kuomintang operating within Indonesia caused a minority of left-wing and pro-Independence Chinese-Indonesians to resist the force.

The Dutch government saw the existence of the Pao An Tui among other Chinese and private militias valuable, as it supported their narrative demonizing the republicans as savages, especially the era dubbed Masa Bersiap. It also viewed the Pao An Tui as a force pulling above its weight as an adjunct to its counterinsurgency efforts.

== Equipment ==
Model	Image	Caliber	Type	Origin	Details
Geweer M. 95	Geweer M. 95 Long Rifle Geweer M. 95 Carbine	6.5×53mmR	Bolt Action	Netherlands	Standard Issue, taken from pre-war stocks.
Madsen	Madsen LMG	8×58mmR Danish Krag	Light machine gun	Denmark	Standard Issue, taken from pre-war stocks.
Lee Enfield	Lee Enfield	.303 British	Bolt Action	United Kingdom	Standard Issue, purchased from commonwealth forces.
Sten	Sten SMG	9×19mm Parabellum	Submachine gun	United Kingdom	Standard Issue, purchased from commonwealth forces.

== Modern Controversy ==
The neutrality of Pao An Tui in the struggle for Indonesia's independence has been challenged on a number of occasions. In early 2016, a media furor was caused by the supposed unveiling of a monument to Pao An Tui at Taman Mini Indonesia Indah by the interior minister Tjahjo Kumolo. Rizieq Shihab, the Islamist leader of the Islamic Defenders Front, was one of the loudest voices against the monument for its supposed glorification of the Pao An Tui. In fact, the monument in question was dedicated to an earlier Chinese militia, formed in the aftermath of the Chinese Massacre of 1740 in Batavia, that fought with the Javanese against the Dutch East India Company.

Various conspiracy theories continue to be associated with the putative specter of the Pao An Tui. For instance, in an opinion piece of May 2017, the writer and political commentator Batara Hutagalung accuses descendants of the Pao An Tui of conspiring with the Dutch government, supporters of Indonesian federalism and the defunct Indonesian Communist Party of destabilizing Indonesia by attempting to establish control over its resources, consumer market, as well as its geo-political and geo-strategic position as a form of 'historic revenge'.
