= Pirotehnia Armatei =

Former Romanian munitions factory

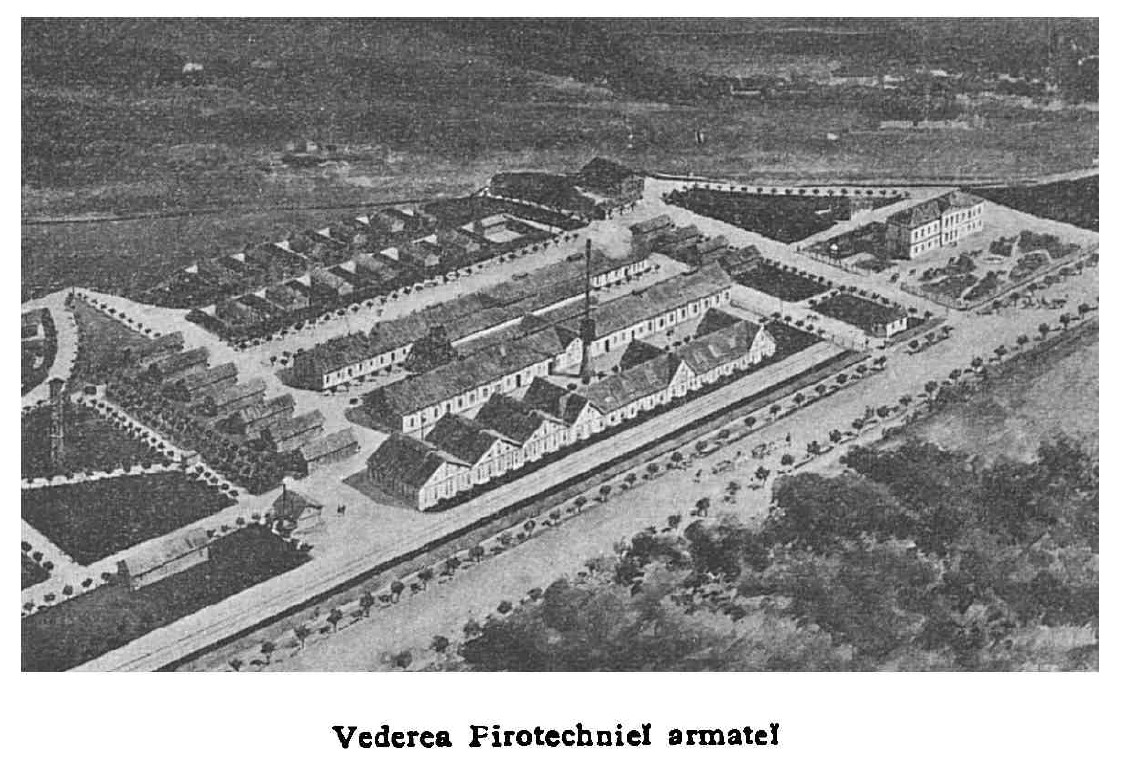
- Pirotehnia Armatei in 1902
- Company type: State-owned factory
- Industry: Metal fabrication
- Founded: 1861; 165 years ago in Bucharest, Romania
- Defunct: 1939
- Fate: Moved to Bumbești-Jiu, Gorj County
- Successor: Sadu Mechanical Plant
- Key people: Henrich Herkt
- Products: Cartridges; Shells

Pirotehnia Armatei (or the Army Pyrotechnics in English) was the munitions factory of the Romanian Army. It was founded in Bucharest on 23 November 1861. In 1939, it was moved to Sadu (Bumbești-Jiu) where it continued to work as Pirotehnia Armatei Sadu until 1948. Today the factory is known as the Sadu Mechanical Plant. The former factory from Bucharest was eventually transformed into the "9 May" Plant in 1950, and was demolished in 2009.

The headstamp of the factory was "PA", though many variations such as "PAB", "PAF", "PAH", "PAM", and "PAR" also existed.

== History ==
=== Origins ===
After the unification of Moldavia and Wallachia, the need arose for creating modern centers of production and maintenance of weapons and ammunition. To accomplish this task, then-Minister of War General Ion Emanoil Florescu, sent artillery officer Henrich Herkt to Belgium on a mission to study the process of manufacturing ammunition. Captain Herkt returned in October 1861 with machines necessary to establish a pyrotechnics factory.

The same year, the new Minister of War, Prince Ion Ghica, presented a report on the need of establishing an ammunition factory to Domnitor Alexandru Ioan Cuza. Following this report, the ruler issued an order for the centralization of workshops, powder mills, and foundry plants within the Artillery Material Establishments Directorate (Direcția Stabilimentelor de Material de Artilerie). This was followed by another order on 23 November 1861, where the Directorate was to be organized in three sections: Section 1 the Pyrotechnics (Pirotehnia), Section 2 the Army Construction Arsenal (Arsenalul de construcții al armatei) in Bucharest, and Section 3 the Powder factory (Fabrica de pulbere) located in Târgșor near Ploiești. Major Herkt was named director of the establishments. Initially, the Army Arsenal and the Pyrotechnics were intended to be located at Malmaison. However, since a barracks was established there, the Arsenal and the Pyrotechnics were installed in buildings on Dealul Spirii.

The Pyrotechnics section consisted of a workshop for the manufacture of ammunition and fireworks needed by the army, a workshop for the manufacture and loading of cartridges, a chemistry laboratory, and a powder warehouse. The first manufactured projectile was presented to Alexandru Ioan Cuza in 1862.

Major Herkt was sent to Belgium again to study the process of manufacturing infantry armaments. He returned 14 months later with the necessary means to mass-produce small arms. In 1865, Colonel Herkt offered Cuza an "artillery musketoon", and a "spahis rifle".

=== War of Independence to World War I ===
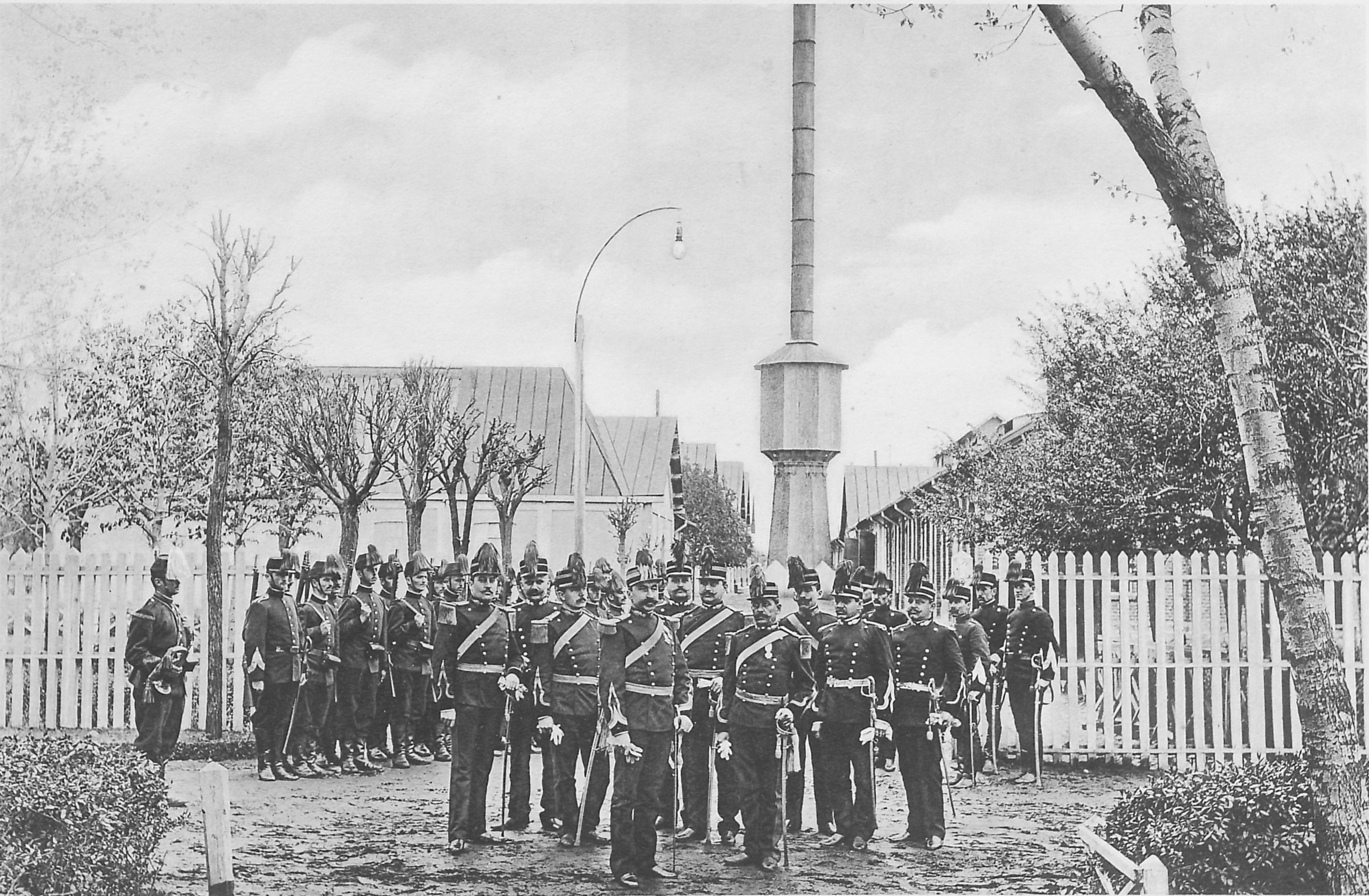
Pirotehnia Armatei in 1902. The chimney was built in 1889.

Until the War of Independence, the armament factories were modernized to keep up with the technologies of the time. These included Decauville internal transport facilities, hot water installations, boilers, and steam engines. The modernization process continued after the war, however, due to the shortage of skilled workers, Pirotehnia reached full operating capacity only in 1892. Through a decree issued in 1873, the Arsenal and the Pyrotechnics were separated. The Pyrotechnics were moved to Cotroceni. At the same time, an "Artificer School" was established.

Under the supervision of architect Dobre Nicolau, various buildings were constructed at Cotroceni. In 1889, a chimney and a water tower were built. By 1902, the Pyrotechnics covered an area of over 13 hectares (32 acres), and around 2,000 military and civilian personnel was employed. In 1913, the manufacturing of 75 and 150 mm shells started at the factory. By 1914, Pirotehnia could produce 200,000 6.5×53mmR cartridges for the Mannlicher M1893 rifles, 500 artillery shell cases, and 500 warheads for the Model 1904 gun, and could also load 1 million infantry cartridges each day. With the plans of entering the war, a new Pyrotechnics factory was established next to the old one on 31 August 1915. It was to produce 500,000 cartridges, 7,000 projectiles, and 70 tons of brass daily. By the time Romania entered the war, it was partially operational.

=== World War I and the Interwar period ===
When Romania entered the war, the Pyrotechnics factories could produce 550,000 cartridges for the Model 1893 rifles, and load 1.8 million rounds. Additionally, 50,000 cartridges for the Model 1879 rifles, 100,000 cartridges for the Steyr pistols, 30,000 cartridges for the Model 1896 revolvers, 2,500 artillery cases and 2,500 warheads, as well as many other components of some ammunition types could be produced daily. During the war, the Pyrotechnics, along with the Arsenal and the Powder Factory, were evacuated to Moldavia. Production continued but was significantly affected due to a lack of raw materials, qualified personnel, and some abandoned machinery in Bucharest. After the war, the munitions factories replenished the country's ammunition stocks. The Army Pyrotechnics refurbished over 5.6 million projectiles and manufactured approximately one billion rounds. Following the start of an Army program in 1935, the establishments were modernized and reorganized, and new factories were established. The Pyrotechnics continued the production of cartridges for both infantry rifles, artillery, anti-tank, and anti-aircraft guns.

=== From 1939 ===
In 1939, the Bucharest establishments were reorganized and moved through the no. 3010/1939 Royal Decree. The Pyrotechnics were moved to Bumbești-Jiu in the Gorj County. The change was made in order to better protect factories from eventual bombing raids. It continued to work with the name "Pirotehnia Armatei Sadu". During the Second World War, the factory could produce: 720,000 9×19mm Parabellum cartridges, 6.2 million 7.92×57mm Mauser cartridges, and 125,000 13.2×99mm Hotchkiss Long cartridges each month. After the war, in 1948, the factory was renamed to the "Sadu State Metallurgical Enterprise", eventually becoming "Uzina Mecanică Sadu".

The former Pyrotechnics from Bucharest continued to operate as a military enterprise until 1950, when it was transformed into the "9 May" Plant. The factory complex was eventually demolished in 2009.

== Bibliography ==
- Stroea, Adrian; Ghinoiu, Marin (2015). File din istoria artileriei. Fapte, întâmplări și oameni (in Romanian). Bucharest: Editura Centrului Tehnic-Editorial al Armatei. ISBN 9786065241510.
- Stroea, Adrian (2008). 165 ani de existență a artileriei române moderne (PDF) (in Romanian). Bucharest. Archived from the original (PDF) on 26 August 2011.
- Popescu, Ion (1977). Istoria artileriei române (in Romanian). Bucharest: Editura Militară. OCLC 895260112.
- Nestorescu, Valerian (1975). File din trecutul artileriei române moderne (in Romanian). Bucharest: Editura Militară. OCLC 20469821.
- Ionescu, Gheorghe M. (1902). Istoria Cotrocenilor, Lupescilor (Sf. Elefterie) și Grozavescilor (in Romanian). Tipografia și fonderia de litere Thomas Basilescu.
