= Mannlicher M1893 =

Romanian bolt-action rifle

Romanian repeating rifle model 1893
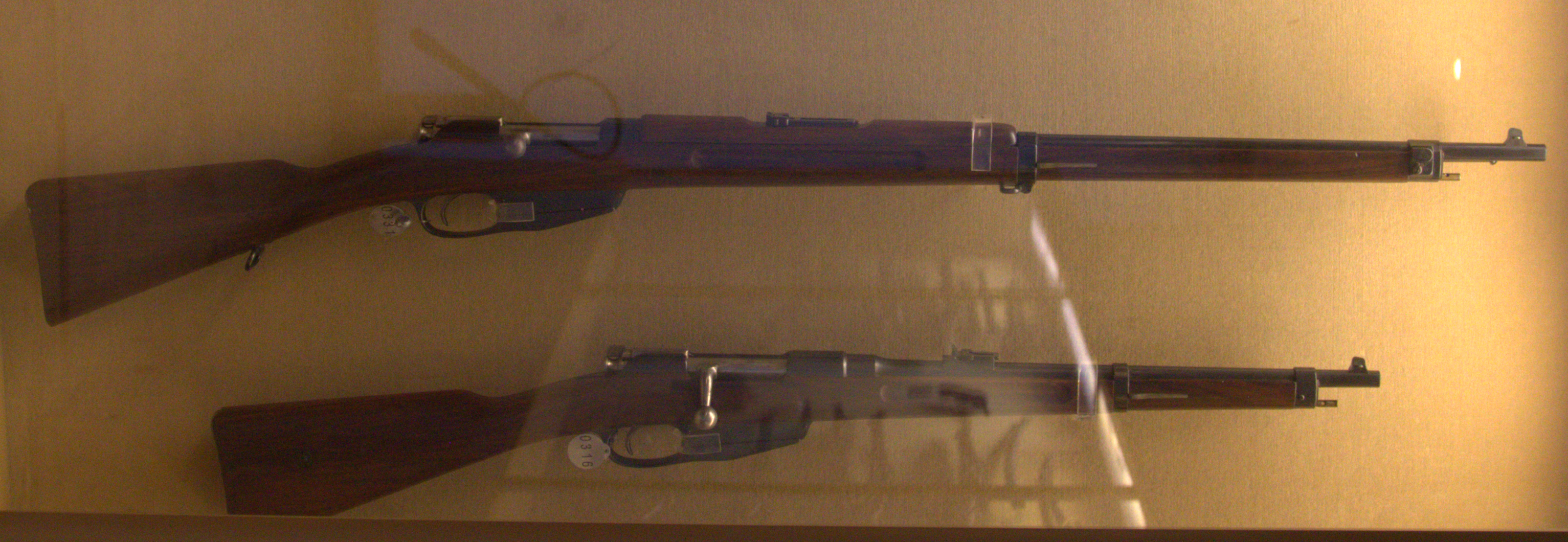
- Rifle and carbine variants.
- Type: Bolt-action rifle
- Place of origin: Austria-Hungary; Romania

Service history
- In service: 1893–1946
- Used by: See Users
- Wars: 1907 Romanian peasants' revolt Macedonian Struggle; Second Balkan War; World War I Hungarian–Romanian War; Spanish Civil War; World War II

Production history
- Designer: Otto Schönauer, Ferdinand Mannlicher
- Designed: 1892
- Manufacturer: ŒWG
- Produced: 1893–1914
- No. built: over 500,000
- Variants: M1893 Carbine, M1904 rifle

Specifications
- Mass: 4.06 kg (9.0 lb); 3.29 kg (7.3 lb) Carbine
- Length: 1,227 mm (48.3 in); 978 mm (38.5 in) Carbine
- Barrel length: 725 mm (28.5 in); 450 mm (18 in) Carbine
- Cartridge: 6.5×53mmR; 8×50mmR Mannlicher; 7.92×57mm Mauser (M1904 variant).22 Long Rifle (1946 trainers)
- Action: Turning bolt-action
- Muzzle velocity: 731 m/s (2,400 ft/s)
- Maximum firing range: 2,100 metres (2,300 yd)
- Feed system: 5-round en bloc clip, integral box magazine

The Mannlicher M1893 (or M93) is a bolt-action rifle that was the standard service rifle of the Kingdom of Romania from 1893 to 1938. The rifle and its 1892 predecessor were the first repeating rifles to be widely issued in the Romanian military. It was later replaced by the Czechoslovak-designed Vz. 24 as the standard service rifle.

== Development ==
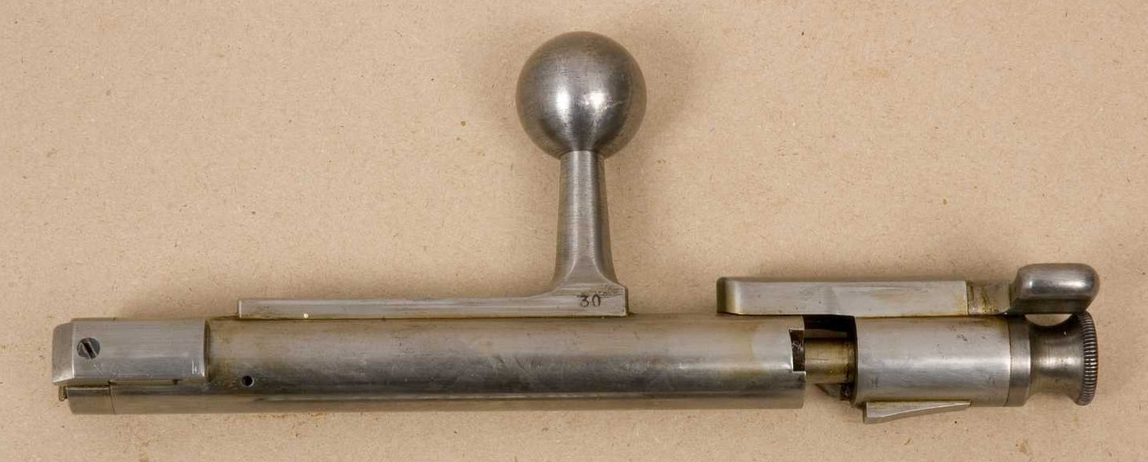
Mannlicher M1893 bolt

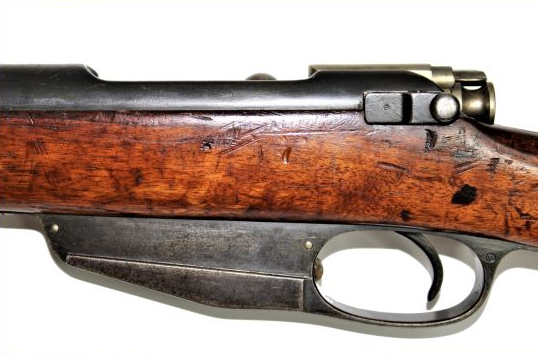
Mannlicher M1893 magazine

Around the year 1890 the Romanian military started its search for a small-bore firearm powered by smokeless powder to replace the breech-loading single-shot Martini–Henry M1879. They turned to the nearby Österreichische Waffenfabriksgesellschaft (ŒWG) in Steyr, Austria-Hungary where then-factory manager Otto Schönauer was modifying the German Gewehr 1888 rifle, the license on which ŒWG got as a compensation for patent infringement by the Komissiongewehr's designers on Ferdinand Mannlicher's en-bloc clip feeding system. After Mannlicher and Schönauer removed all the obvious defects of the G88 caused by its hasty design (mainly fixed the double feeding problem by modifying bolt head geometry) and adapted the German modernization of the clip allowing the latter to be fed into the rifle regardless of whether the clip was turned up or down for a rimmed round, the Model 1892 rifle was ready for testing by the Romanian Army. A number of 8,000 rifles were ordered between 1891 and 1892. After some minor improvements, the final variant, the M1893, chambered for the 6.5x53R round also called the "6.5x53.5mmR Romanian", was put into production. Compared to the M1892 model, the M1893 had an additional stacking rod, reinforcing ribs on the lower part of the magazine housing, and a safety feature was added to the bolt so it could not be re-inserted if assembled improperly. Unlike the Austrian-issue Mannlicher M1895 straight-pull bolt-action rifle, the Romanian rifle had a conventional turn-bolt.

The rifle's adoption caused some controversy, as despite the weapon's approval by King Carol I, General Constantin Budișteanu derided the Austrian rifle as un baton ("a stick") that required improvements. The rifle's bore, smaller than the usual Mannlicher product, also caused difficulties in finding compatible gunpowder.

A carbine variant was also introduced, it was 98 centimetres (39 in) long and featured a bent bolt handle. It was used by cavalry and artillery units. Unlike the rifles, the carbines could not mount bayonets. This forced the cavalry units fighting on foot to use their lances in melee combat during the 1916 campaign. A bayonet was eventually added to 20,000 carbines after an invention by cavalry Captain Botez.

== History ==
Deliveries started in 1893, and by 1907 more than 100,000 rifles were in service. After the end of the Second Balkan War, Romania ordered 200,000 more rifles, however, only about 100,000 of these were delivered due to the start of the First World War. Rifles which were not delivered entered service with the Austro-Hungarian Army. The assembled rifles in the original caliber were designated as "6.5mm M.93 Rumänisches Repetier Gewehr". Unassembled rifles were modified to accommodate the 8×50mmR Mannlicher cartridge and issued to Austrian Landwehr units. When Romania entered the war in 1916, around 373,000 rifles and 60,000 carbines were in service with the Romanian Army. These were distributed to the infantry and Vânători regiments, while carbines were issued to cavalry, cyclists and Vânători units as well as the Gendarmerie and the military aviation. Many rifles were destroyed or captured during the Romanian campaign. At the end of the war, only 82,000 rifles were still in service with Romania. With the adoption of the ZB rifle (vz. 24), the Mannlicher rifles and carbines were transferred to second-line troops and the Gendarmerie, where they remained in use until the end of World War II.

Following the war, 8mm M93 rifles were given as war reparations to Czechoslovakia and Yugoslavia. The Yugoslav rifles, designated as "Puška 8mm M93", were captured by the Germans in World War II. The Germans referred to these rifles as "8mm Puschka M93/30 Rumänisches". The Romanian Mannlicher also saw some service in the Spanish Civil War by Spanish Republicans and captured by the Nationalists. It is unknown how these rifles were obtained.

== Portuguese Mannlicher M1896 ==
The Kingdom of Portugal bought about 12,500 6.5mm Mannlicher rifles and carbines from Steyr, some in 1896, for the Navy and Cavalry, and the remainder in 1898 for the Artillery. These rifles carry the "CI" monogram of Carlos I of Portugal. The 6.5x53R cartridges were first imported from Georg Roth and later made in Portugal.

In 1946 a few hundred of the Portuguese Mannlichers were adapted to fire the 5.6mm calibre (.22 Rimfire), for training.

== Other variants ==
=== Mannlicher M1893 miniature rifle ===
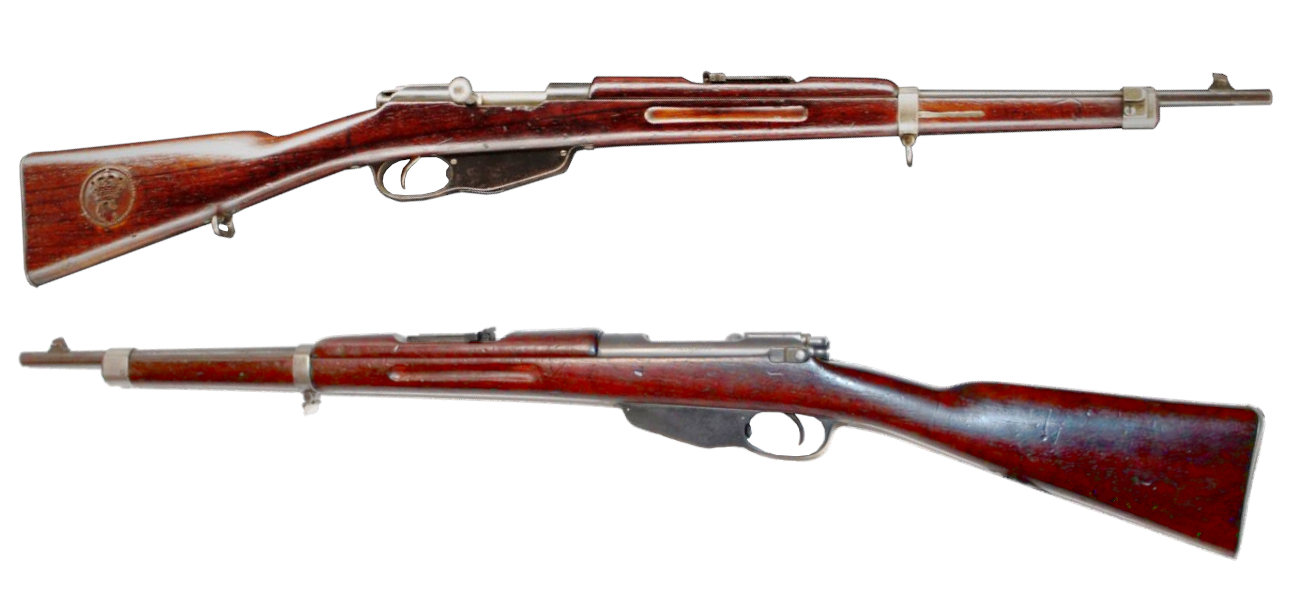
The miniature M1893

Around 1899, a miniature version of the M1893 rifle was produced as a special order for the young Prince Carol. The rifle had a barrel length of 36 cm (14 in) with an overall length of 71 cm (28 in) and a weight of 1.9 kg (4.2 lb) and was chambered in 5.7×33mmR Sommerda. The miniature also featured the monogram of Prince Carol on the butt of the rifle. Unlike the regular M1893, the miniature rifle lacked the reinforcing rib at the base of the magazine and the ejector was mounted on the bolt head, making the miniature similar to the M1892 rifle. The miniature M1893 is kept in the collections of the Romanian National Military Museum.

=== Mannlicher M1904 ===
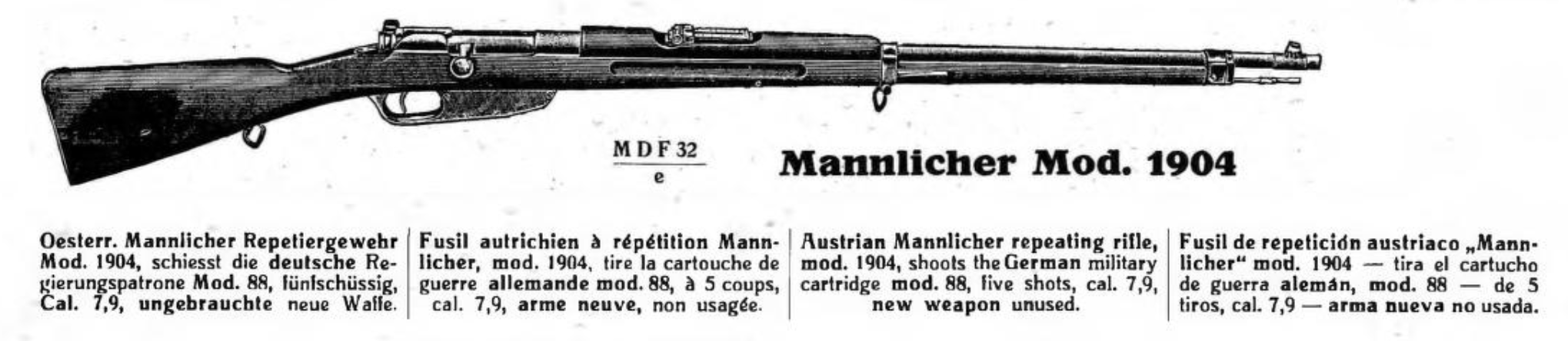
An early advertisement for the 1904 rifle in several languages

In 1904, ŒWG would slightly modify the original M1893 design, primarily by rechambering it to the 7.9×57J rimless cartridge (using the same clip as the original Gewehr 1888 rifle) and offering it for sale. Two buyers would be interested: the Ulster Volunteer Force, and the Chinese Army, who used the M1904 in their Hanyang 88 design. The Irish would purchase and smuggle in around 11,000, these Irish rifles looked very similar to the Romanian M1893, but were manufactured using leftover parts from the M1892. Some of these rifles would end up in British stocks when some of the Ulster members, wanting to join the British Army, would turn in their rifles. A few would also be obtained by the Austro-Hungarian army in the beginning of World War I, as most firearms not yet delivered would be seized at the start of the war.

== Ammunition ==
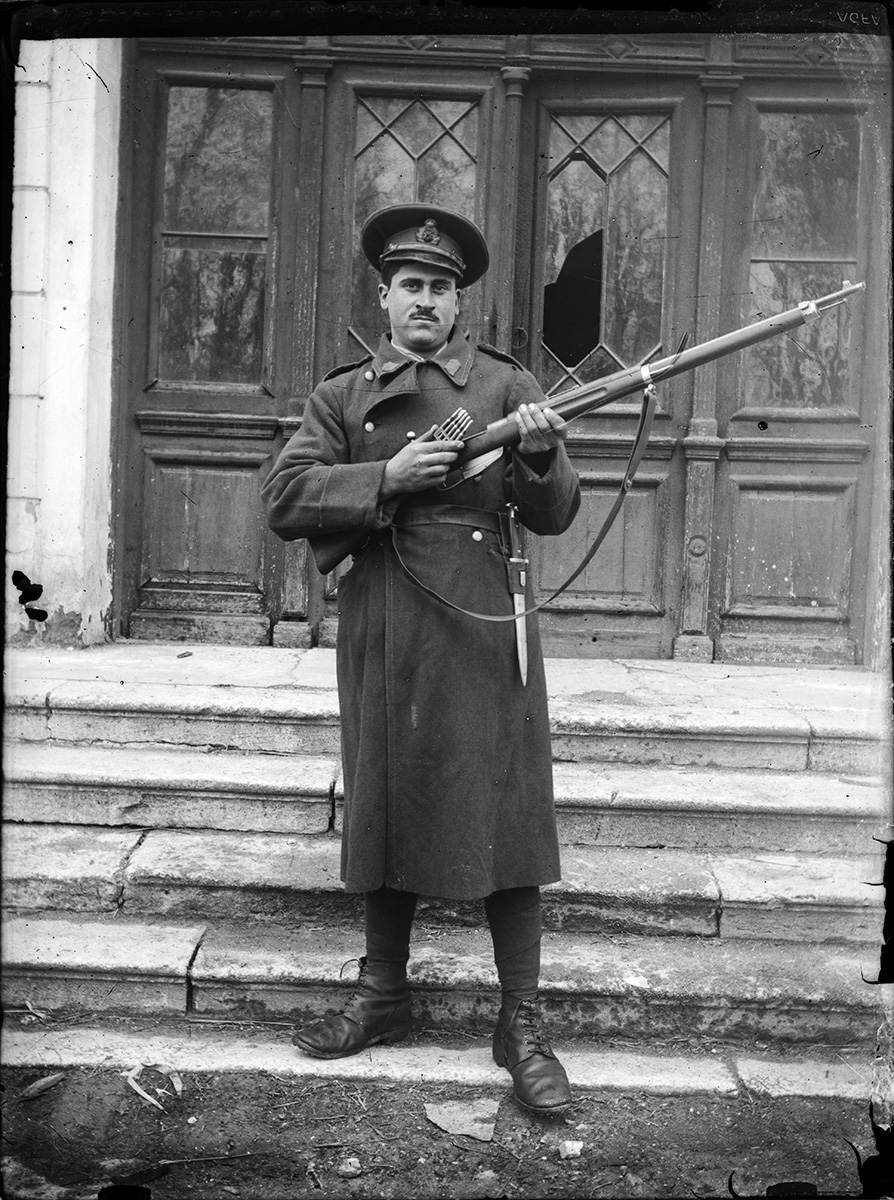
Romanian gendarme or prison guard with the M93 and its bayonet

6.5×53mmR: The 6.5×53mmR ammunition for the Romanian rifles was provided at first by Georg Roth, and Keller & Co. Local production was also carried out at Pirotehnia Armatei, with a production rate of 200,000 cartridges per day registered in 1914. Later, ammunition was also purchased from DWM, Manfréd Weiss and Hirtenberger Patronen. During the First World War, factories from France (Société Française des Munitions of Paris), Italy (Società Metallurgica Italiana of Livorno), the United Kingdom (Kings Norton), and the United States (US Cartridge Company of Lowell) also provided ammunition.

World War 2-era 6.5×53mmR caliber surplus and earlier ammunition is still available, but these are primarily corrosive in nature and rifles will require a thorough cleaning to reduce the development of rust. Due to very close dimensional relationships, boxer-primed cartridge cases can be made by resizing and trimming .303 British or .30-40 Krag (.30-40 US) brass, and fire forming the resulting altered brass cases in the 6.5x53R chamber. Alteration of the original chamber by re-chambering with a 6.5x57R chamber reamer has also been done, but the overall length of the original 6.5x53mmR Romanian cartridge has to be maintained by seating the projectile more deeply in order to fit the original magazine. It would also be a best practice to retain the upper C.I.P. 6.5x57mmR pressure limit of 3300 Bar to reduce additional stress on these 80 to 125 year old rifles.

8×50mmR Mannlicher: 8×50mmR Mannlicher reloadable cartridge cases can be produced by reforming and trimming 8×56mmR Mannlicher or 7.62×54mmR Mosin–Nagant Russian brass. Standard .323" 8mm S-bullets are correct for this caliber though best results are obtained from open-base bullets that can expand to fit the .329" bore. RCBS offers both reforming and reloading dies. Rifles such as the Mannlicher M.95 using a stronger rotating-bolt design can be loaded to higher pressures.

== Users ==
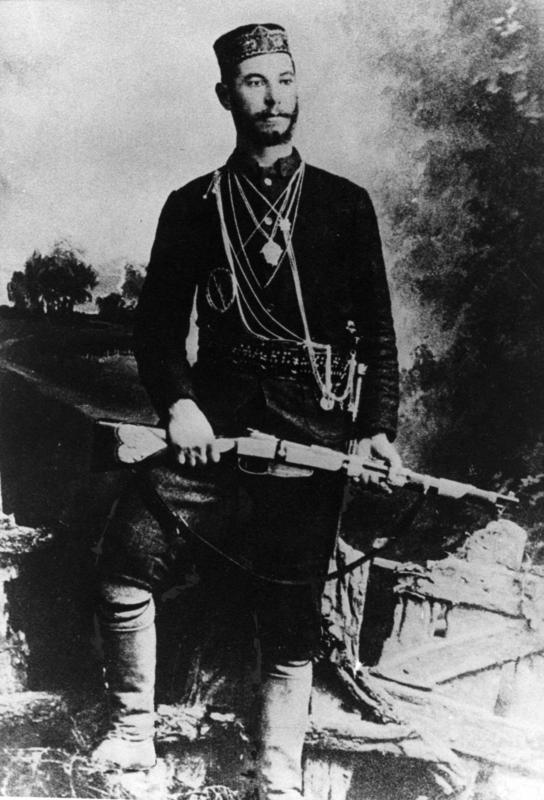
A Greek revolutionary with an M1893 carbine

- Austria-Hungary
- Qing Dynasty: M1904 variant
- Czechoslovakia
- Nazi Germany
- Kingdom of Portugal
- Kingdom of Romania
- Spanish Republic: used by the Spanish Republican faction
- Kingdom of Yugoslavia

=== Non-state users ===
- Macedonian revolutionaries: M1893 carbines used by various groups during the Macedonian Struggle between 1904 and 1908
- Ulster Volunteer Force: M1904 variant

== Gallery ==
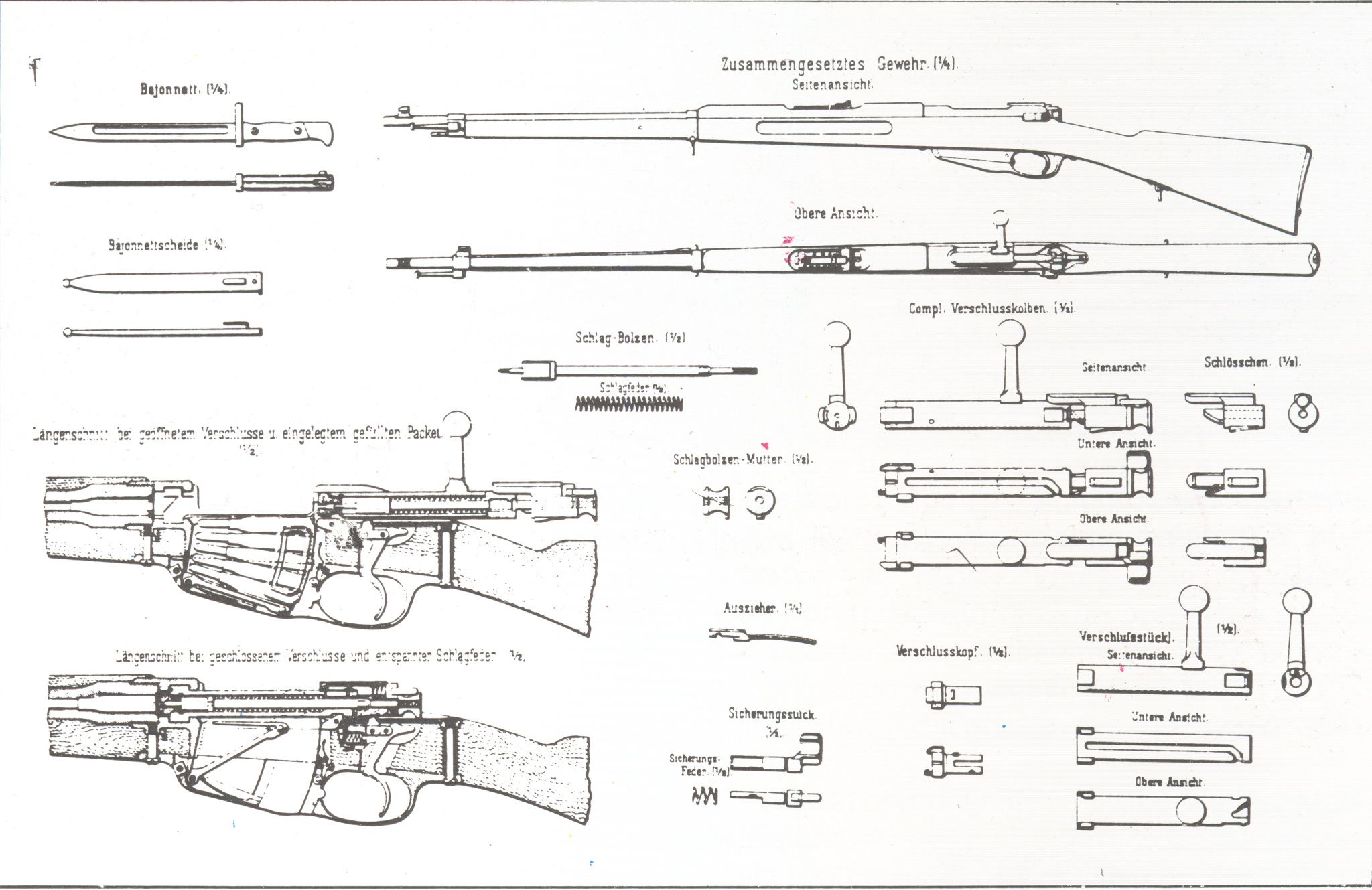
Diagram of the Romanian Mannlicher M93

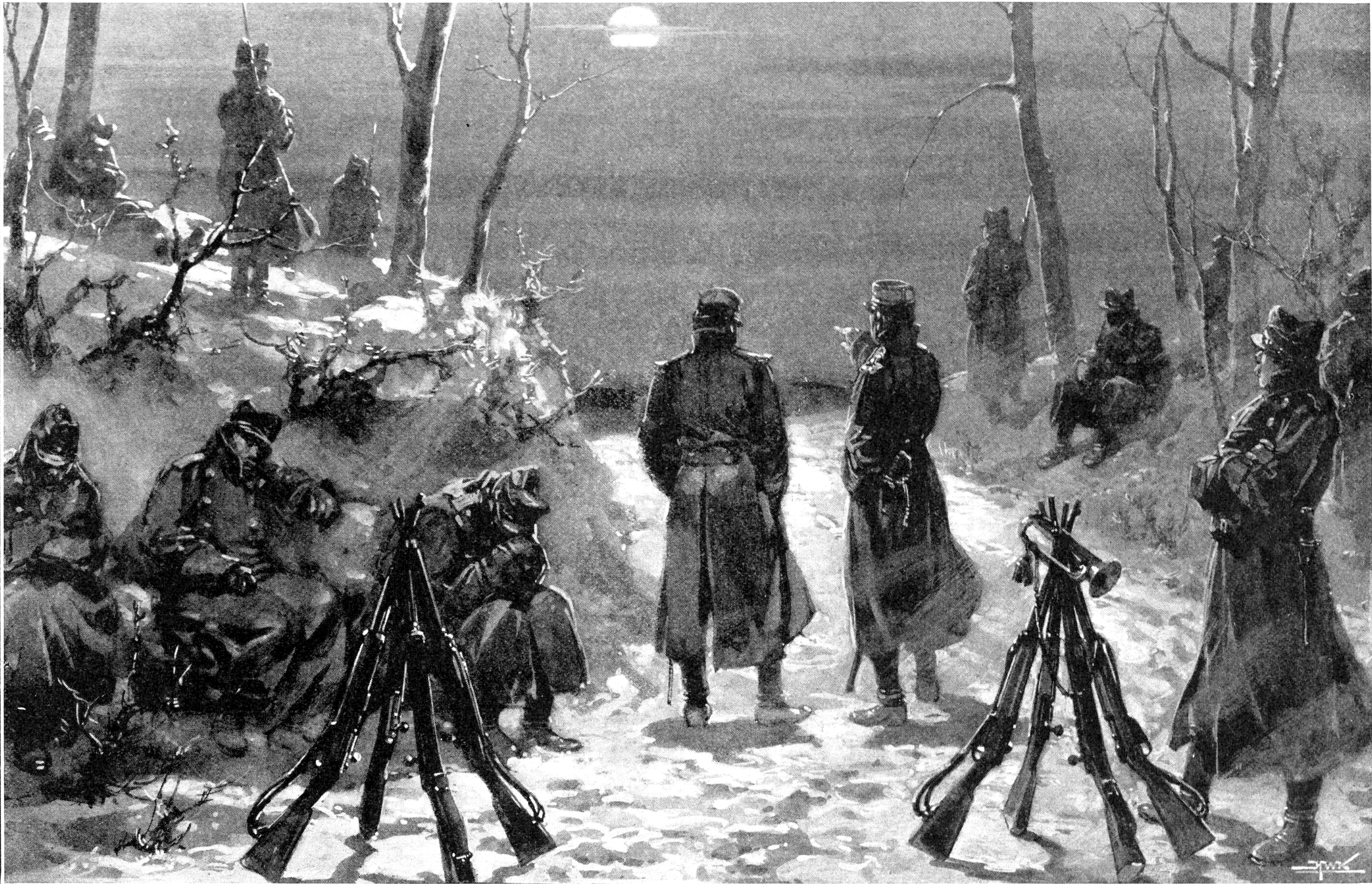
Romanian soldiers during the 1907 peasant revolt

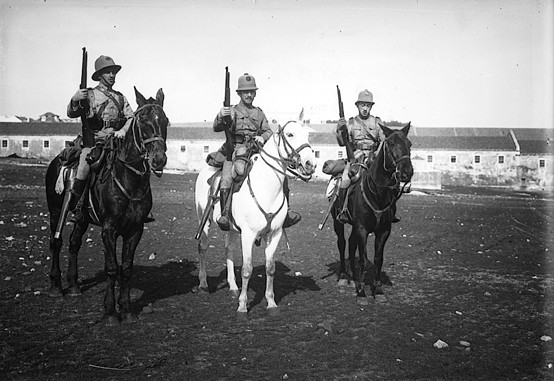
Portuguese cavalry

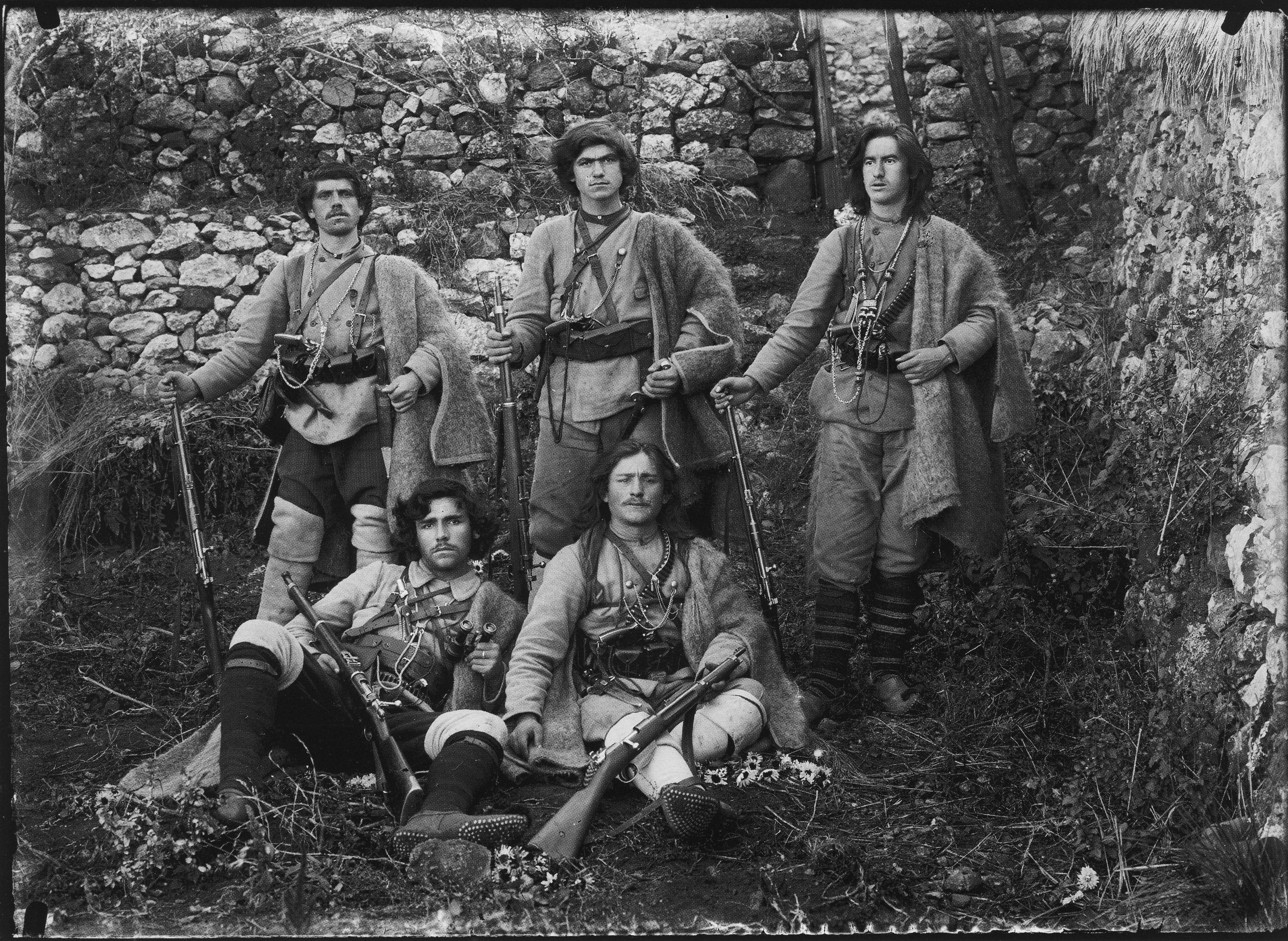
Bulgarian IMARO band armed with Mannlichers

== See also ==
- Geweer M. 95 - Dutch Mannlicher variant, similar to the M1893
- Table of handgun and rifle cartridges
- 6.5×53mmR
- 8×50mmR Mannlicher

== Bibliography ==
- Scafeș, Cornel (2013). "Efortul depus în vederea asigurării necesarului de armament, tehnică de luptă și muniții ale armatei române în anii neutralității (1914-1916)". București - Materiale de Istorie și Muzeografie (in Romanian) (XXVII/2013). Bucharest: Muzeul Municipiului București. ISSN 1222-7536.
