= Geweer M. 95 =

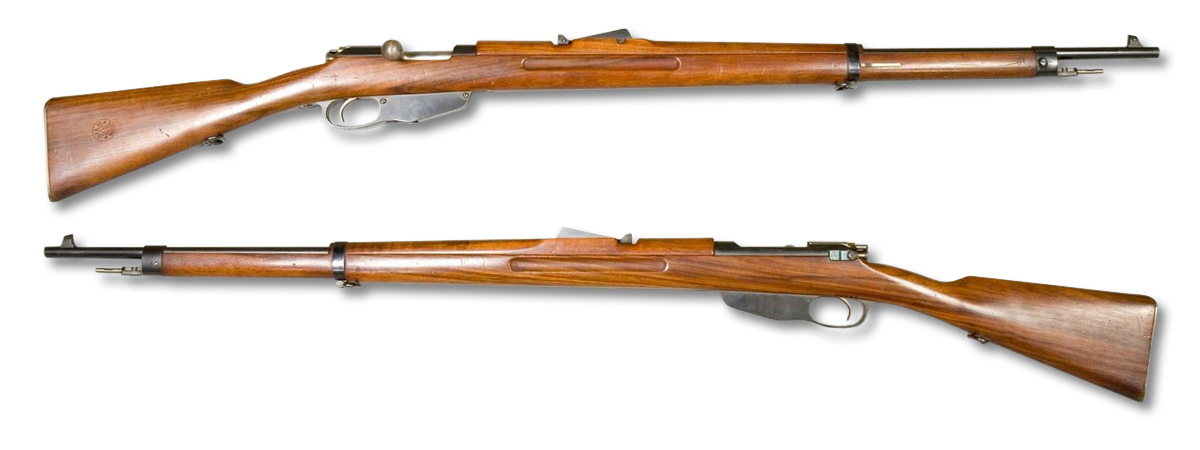
- The Geweer Model 1895
- Type: Service rifle, Bolt-action rifle
- Place of origin: Netherlands

Service history
- In service: 1895–1949
- Used by: Netherlands; Republic of Indonesia; Empire of Japan; Nazi Germany
- Wars: Aceh War; Dutch intervention in Bali (1906); Dutch intervention in Bali (1908); World War I World War II; Indonesian National Revolution

Production history
- Designer: Otto Schönauer and Ferdinand Mannlicher
- Designed: 1895
- Manufacturer: ŒWG, Artillerie Inrichtingen
- Produced: 1895–1940
- No. built: approx. 650,000
- Variants: See Variants

Specifications
- Mass: M95 Rifle: 4.35 kg (9.6 lb); Carbine.No 4: 3.37 kg (7.4 lb)
- Length: M95 Rifle: 1,287 mm (50.7 in); Carbine.No 4: 951 mm (37.4 in)
- Barrel length: M95 Rifle: 790 mm (31 in); Carbine.No 4: 450 mm (18 in)
- Cartridge: 6.5×53mmR.303 British; 7.7×58mm Arisaka
- Action: Bolt-action
- Muzzle velocity: 742 m/s (2,430 ft/s)
- Effective firing range: up to 400 m (440 yd)
- Feed system: 5-round en-bloc clip
- Sights: Iron sights

The Geweer M. 95, also known to collectors as the Dutch Mannlicher, was the service rifle of the armed forces of the Netherlands between 1895 and 1940 which replaced the obsolete Beaumont-Vitali M1871/88. At first it was produced by Steyr for the Dutch, but after 1904, production took place under license at a Dutch state weapon factory in Zaandam known by the name of close by Hembrug bridge. Although often regarded as being based on the earlier Mannlicher 1893 Model, the rifle is in fact a modification of the Mannlicher rifle by August Schriever and the Dutch rifle commission. The Dutch issued about 470,000 M.95s.

Both Dutch and Romanian rifles fired the same rimmed cartridge often referred to as "Romanian" 6.5x53.5mmR or "Dutch 6.5" 6.5×53 mmR. It was also known as the .256 Mannlicher. In military service, Dutch M.95 rifles (6.5×53 mmR) cartridges are loaded primarily through the use of an en-bloc clip, similar in concept to the clip used later by the US Army's M1 Garand. With the Ferdinand Mannlicher designed trigger guard / magazine housing assembly, when the bolt is open and fully retracted to the rear the full en-bloc clip is loaded into the magazine from the top through the open receiver. The empty clip will fall out through a hole in the base of the magazine housing when out of cartridges. This enabled quick reloading of the rifles during combat. When the bolt is in the fully open and retracted position, full clips can be vigorously ejected upwards from the magazine housing by means of a spring loaded latch at the rear of the magazine. This is operated by a recessed button in the front of the trigger guard portion of the assembly. The clips were essentially disposable as ammunition would be issued already loaded into clips from the factory.

== History ==
In the 1880s, two important developments took place that disrupted the current armament paradigm: the adoption of repeating (i.e. magazine) rifles, and the invention of smokeless gunpowder. On 23 February 1886, the Dutch Minister of War appointed a "commission for the purpose of evaluating the rifle question", which was tasked with gathering information on the new system of repeating rifles. As the matter of finding a new rifle was regarded a long-term goal, the immediate adoption of a magazine rifle was also considered. By 1888, the M1871 Beaumont rifle was modified with a 4-round Vitali magazine, to serve as an interim solution.

With regards to adopting a new rifle, the commission utilised two principles: The rifle had to have been adopted or at least been considered for adoption by other nations, and the commission would focus on the barrel, bolt, and cartridge of the system. A further question was the inclusion of a magazine cut-off device, allowing the weapon to be used as a single-shot rifle, much like the Beaumont-Vitali M71/88 just adopted. In 1890, the chief of the General Staff and the Inspector of the Infantry allowed the commission to ignore the magazine cut-off function, allowing the rifle to be a "pure" repeater. Nine rifles using a clip system of loading were trialled: the Austrian Mannlicher 1886, the Italian Vinci rifle, a so-called Bergman rifle, a Belgian Mosin–Nagant rifle, an improved Belgian Pieper rifle, the Krag–Jørgensen rifle, a Swiss Frey rifle made by the Neuhausen factory, the German Gewehr 1888 rifle, and an improved Mannlicher rifle from the August Schriever factory in Belgium. The latter had his own firearms factory, in addition to being an agent of the Oesterrreichishe Waffenfabriks Gesellschaft Steyr.

Some rifles were immediately disqualified: The Vinci rifle was provided with too little ammunition for testing; the German rifle was provided without any ammunition at all. It was recommended to create a rifle from the best elements of those rifles provided, with the August Schriever Mannlicher rifle being the preferred base rifle. At the final moment however, the Nagant firm submitted a new and improved rifle, using a Mauser style stripper clip.

It was thus decided to trial both rifles, and by the end of November 1890, both manufacturers were asked to provide the necessary rifles for a large scale trial. Both manufacturers agreed to provide the rifles, at the price of 155 Dutch guilders. Following further small scale trials, the commission decided to focus on three rifles: the German 1888, the August Schriever modified Mannlicher, and the Nagant rifle. As ammunition for the German 1888 was finally acquired in December 1890, the weapon was subjected to trials, and subsequently removed from consideration: it was possible to cause a double-feed with the German 1888 rifle, resulting in the tip of the rear cartridge's bullet hitting the chambered cartridge's primer, with catastrophic results.

Although the commission initially focused on a calibre of 7.5 to 8 millimetres, a Schriever rifle with an Italian barrel chambered for 6.5 mm was also trialled. As the commission concluded no downsides to the 6.5mm cartridge in comparison to a trialled 7.65mm cartridge, 6.5mm was given preference due to its lower weight. As the Mannlicher style of loading was preferred, the matter was almost settled, with the Schriever modified Mannlicher being the preferred candidate.

In March 1892, a draft contract for 100 rifles was submitted to the Minister of War for his approval. Following small changes to the stock and barrel bands, the sight and other small parts, and the weapon was officially designated the Geweer M. 95 on 4 December 1895.

The rifle was the standard weapon of the Royal Netherlands East Indies Army (KNIL) until the Japanese invasion. M.95 rifles were later used by both sides during the Indonesian National Revolution. After the conclusion of the war, the remaining rifles were handed over by the KNIL to the new Indonesian Armed Forces. In the 1950s, Indonesian Armed Forces rechambered their M.95 rifles and carbines into .303 British, and muzzle brake were added to the carbine variant. The M. 95 remained in Dutch colonial service at least to 1955, where it was in use by the police force of Suriname.

== Variants ==
Nine variants were produced, these were largely carbines differing only in sling swivels. These included :

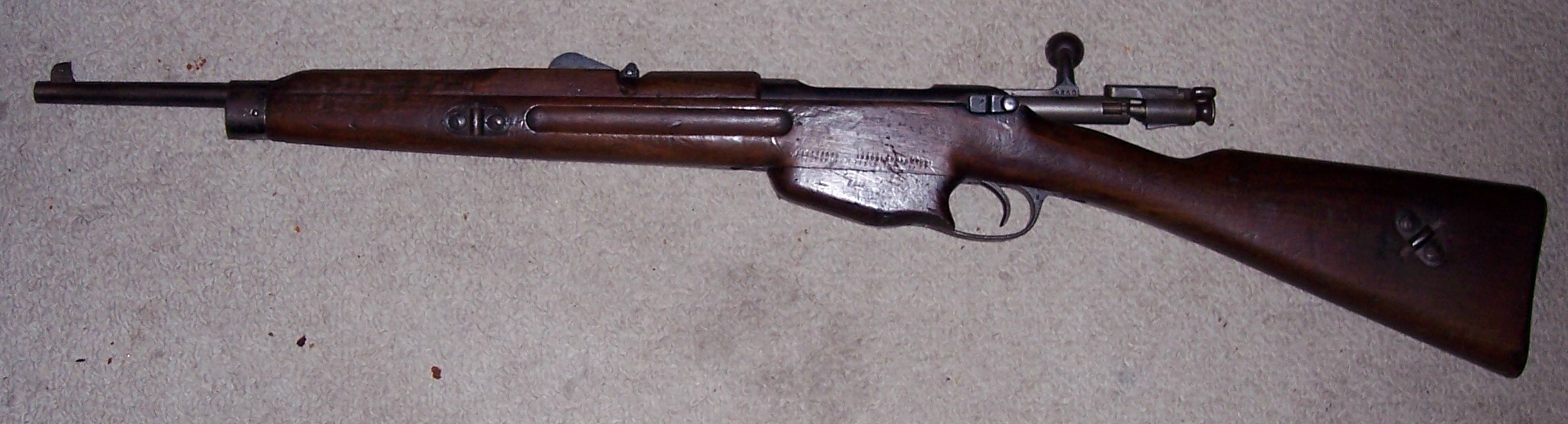
- Dutch Geweer M95 carbine variant from the left
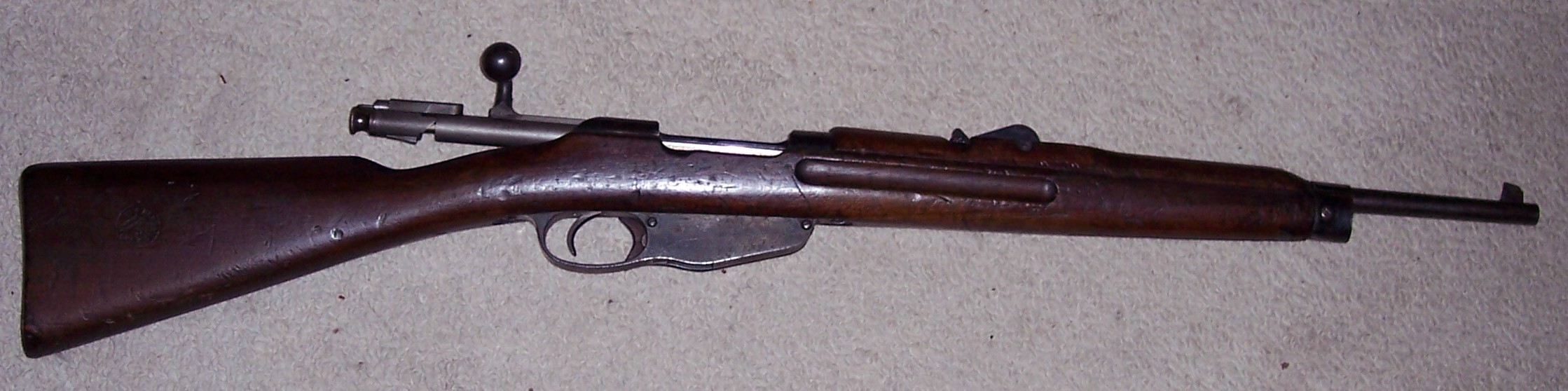
  Dutch Geweer M95 carbine variant from the right
  Karabijn No.1 Oud Model ("old model")(introduced in 1896) designed for the cavalry and the Marechaussee. It later became the official carbine of the KNIL (Koninklijk Nederlands Indisch Leger, Royal Netherlands East Indies Army) in 1911 (1925 for the non-European units in Java).
- Karabijn No.2 for the Koninklijke Marechaussee (Royal Military Constabulary Corps) with a knife bayonet.
- Karabijn No.3 pioneer and artillery carbine model
- Karabijn No.4, a shortened M.95 (designed in 1909) created for the Dutch bicycle troops that had a wooden fairing on the left side of the magazine.
- M.95 Loopgraafgeweer ("trench gun"), a Periscope rifle version of the M.95, designed in 1916 for trench warfare.

Around 1930, new models (Nieuw Model) of the No.1, No.2, No.3 and No.4 were introduced.

In 1936 a shorter No.5 carbine model was introduced. It was a Geweer M95 cut down to carbine size. The first 9,500 were issued to field artillery and anti-aircraft artillery. A total 35,500 were rebuilt in all.

=== Beutewaffen designations ===
After Germany occupied the Netherlands, its captured weapons (beutewaffen) were catalogued for German use. G stands for Gewehr ("Rifle"), Gr. G stands for Graben-Gewehr ("Trench Rifle"), K stands for Karabiner ("Carbine"), and (h) stands for holländisch ("Dutch").

- G. 211(h) — Geweer M1895 (Mannlicher M1895 Infantry Rifle)
- Gr. G. 212(h) — Loopgraafgeweer M1895 (Mannlicher M1895 trench rifle)
- K 411 (h) — Karabijn No.1 Nieuw Model (carbine No.1 New Model, cavalry)
- K 412 (h) — Karabijn No.1 Oud Model (carbine No. 1 Old Model, cavalry)
- K 413 (h) — Karabijn No.3 Oud Model en Nieuw Model (carbine No. 3 Old Model and New Model, artillery & pioneers)
- K 414 (h) — Karabijn No.4 Oud Model en Nieuw Model (carbine No. 4 Old Model and New Model, bicyclists)

The No.2 carbine was not classified because few, if any, were captured. The No.5 carbine was classified as a Geweer M95.

== Ammunition ==
Due to very close dimensional relationships, boxer-primed cartridge cases can be made by resizing and trimming .303 British or .30-40 Krag (.30-40 US) brass, and Fire forming the resulting altered brass cases in the 6.5x53R chamber. Alteration of the original rifle chamber by re-chambering the barrel with a 6.5x57R (see:6.5×57mm Mauser) chamber reamer has also been done, but the overall length of the original 6.5x53mmR Dutch cartridge has to be maintained by seating the projectile more deeply in order to fit the original magazine.

== Gallery ==
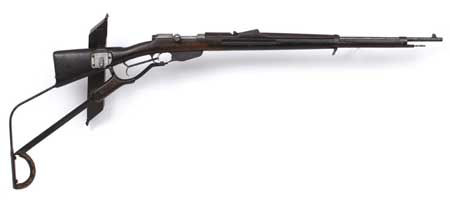
The M.95 periscope rifle

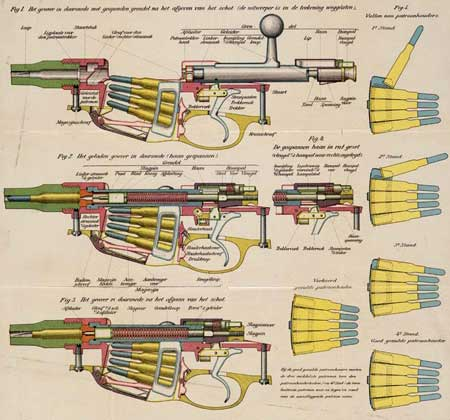
Scheme of operation

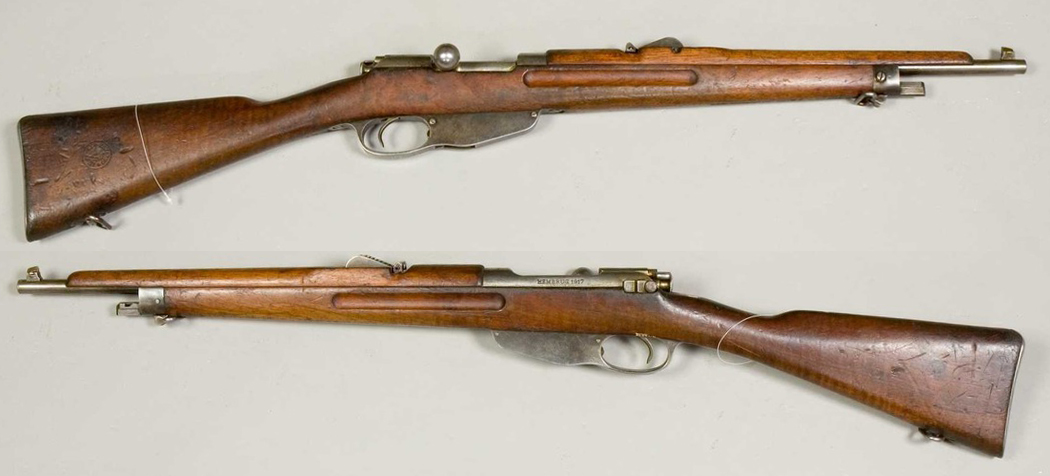
A No.3 Old Model Carbine, from the Swedish Army Museum.

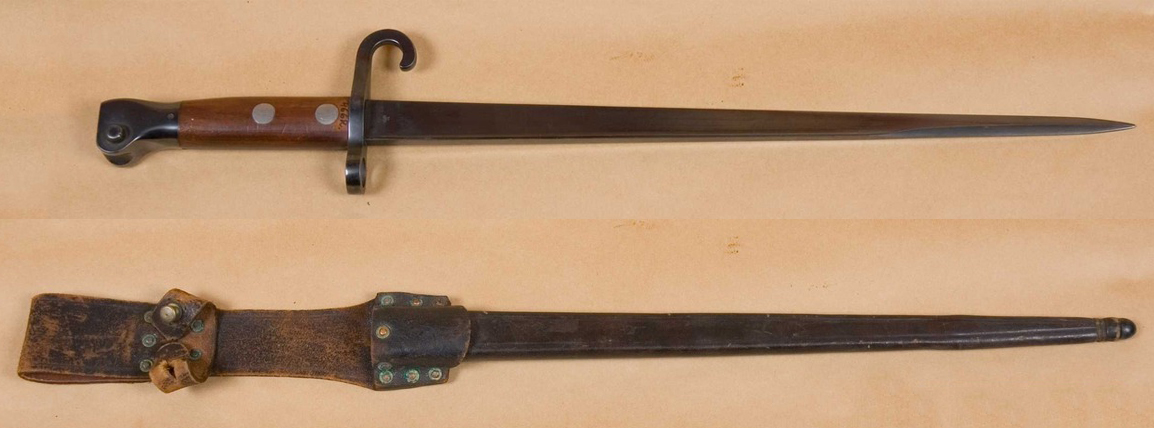
Bayonet and scabbard issued with the rifle

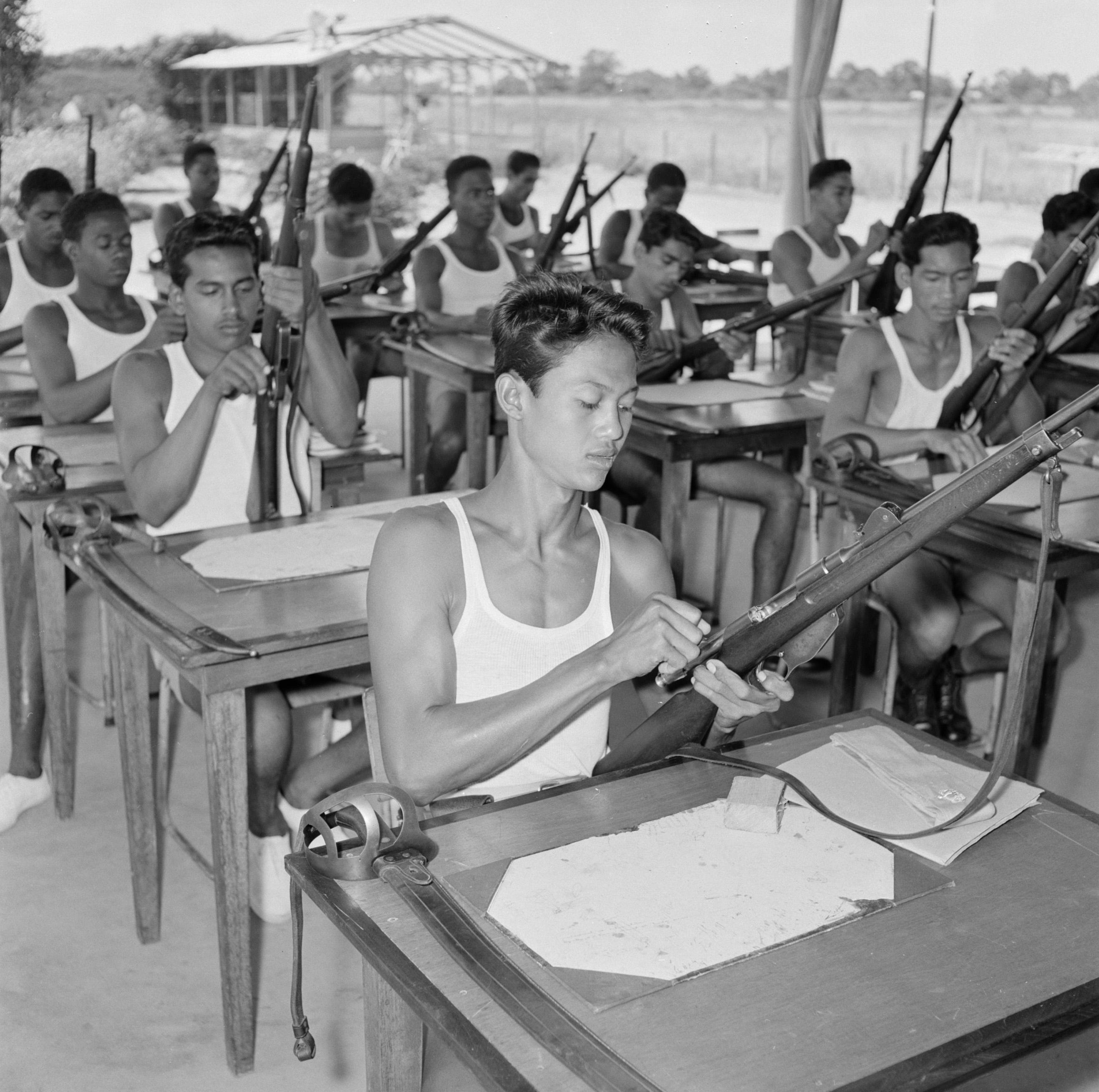
A class at the Suriname Police School in 1955, practice field-stripping

== See also ==
- Table of handgun and rifle cartridges
- 6.5×54mm Mannlicher–Schönauer
- 6.5×55mm Swedish
- 7×57mm Mauser
