= .256 Gibbs Magnum =

Type of obsolete rifle cartridge

- Type: Rifle
- Place of origin: England

Production history
- Designer: George Gibbs of Bristol
- Designed: 1913
- Produced: 1913–present

Specifications
- Parent case: 6.5×57mm Mauser
- Case type: Rimless, bottleneck
- Bullet diameter: .264 in (6.7 mm)
- Neck diameter: .292 in (7.4 mm)
- Shoulder diameter: .430 in (10.9 mm)
- Base diameter: .471 in (12.0 mm)
- Rim diameter: .474 in (12.0 mm)
- Case length: 2.17 in (55 mm)
- Overall length: 3.09 in (78 mm)

Ballistic performance
Bullet mass/type	Velocity	Energy
145 gr (9 g) SP	2,600 ft/s (790 m/s)	2,178 ft⋅lbf (2,953 J)
- Source: Cartridges of the world.

The .256 Gibbs Magnum is an obsolete rimless bottleneck centerfire rifle cartridge developed by George Gibbs of Bristol and introduced in 1913.

== Overview ==
The .256 Gibbs Magnum was designed and introduced by George Gibbs in 1913 for use in their own Mauser style sporting rifles. The cartridge was created by reducing the neck of the 6.5×57mm Mauser by 2 mm.

The .256 Gibbs Magnum is very similar to, but not interchangeable with, the 6.5×55mm Swedish cartridge.

One famous user of the .256 Gibbs Magnum was Denis D. Lyell who used a rifle in this calibre for hunting in Africa.

== See also ==
- List of rifle cartridges
