= 6.5×53mmR =

Austro-Hungarian rimmed rifle cartridge

6.5×53mmR (6.5x53.5mmR)
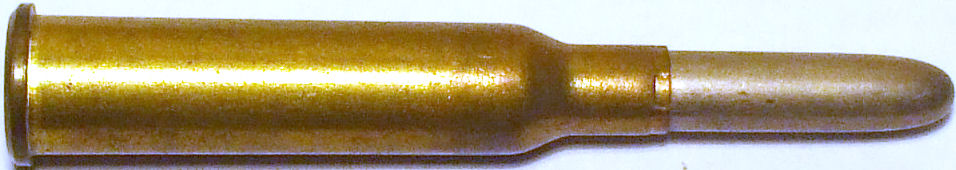
- Military cartridge
- Type: Rifle
- Place of origin: Austria-Hungary

Service history
- In service: 1893–1945
- Used by: Kingdom of Romania; Netherlands; Kingdom of Portugal
- Wars: Aceh War; World War I World War II; Indonesian National Revolution

Production history
- Designer: Steyr Mannlicher, Ferdinand Mannlicher
- Designed: 1892

Specifications
- Case type: Rimmed, bottleneck
- Bullet diameter: 6.65 mm (0.262 in)
- Neck diameter: 7.55 mm (0.297 in)
- Shoulder diameter: 10.75 mm (0.423 in)
- Base diameter: 11.48 mm (0.452 in)
- Rim diameter: 13.4 mm (0.53 in)
- Rim thickness: 1.25 mm (0.049 in)
- Case length: 53.5 mm (2.11 in)
- Overall length: 77.47 mm (3.050 in)
- Rifling twist: 7.874 in (200 mm)
- Primer type: Roth-patent Berdan

Ballistic performance
Bullet mass/type	Velocity	Energy
159 gr (10 g) RN	2,433 ft/s (742 m/s)	2,050 ft⋅lbf (2,780 J)
135 gr (9 g) Kynoch	2,800 ft/s (850 m/s)	2,348 ft⋅lbf (3,183 J)
160 gr (10 g) Kynoch	2,395 ft/s (730 m/s)	2,035 ft⋅lbf (2,759 J)
- Sources: Rifles and Machine Guns.256 Mannlicher / 6.5x53R Reloading Data

The 6.5×53mmR, originally and more correctly produced as the 6.5×53.5mmR, and in imperial system nomenclature known as the .256 Mannlicher, is a late 19th-century rimmed centerfire military rifle cartridge similar to other early smokeless powder designs.

== History and description ==
It's generally assumed that Mannlicher derived his 6.5 mm cartridge from an experimental 6.5 mm rimmed Luigi Scotti design, a precursor of the 6.5×52mm Carcano, which was provided to him by the Italian government in 1890 in order to build a rifle for it.

Mannlicher's Model 1891 rifle was adopted by Romania in 1892 as the Mannlicher M1893 and the Netherlands in 1895. They used the first of a series of 6.5-millimetre (0.26 in) Mannlicher cartridges which became the standard service rifle cartridge for the Romanian Mannlicher M1893 from 1893 to 1938, and the Dutch Geweer M. 95 from 1895 to 1945. Dutch ammunition with cartridge cases made of brass (pre-occupation) or steel (under German occupation) may be encountered on the American surplus market. In both instances, the original cartridges' primer pocket is Berdan-style, of an unusual type (Roth-patent), and features a central flash hole running through the center of the integral Berdan anvil. When examining fired cases from the inside with a flashlight, this design gives the false impression of a Boxer primed cartridge case. Modern Boxer-primed cartridge cases are available, though more rare.

Portugal's Navy adopted this cartridge for the Mannlicher Model 1896, officially known as "Espingarda Portuguesa Mod. 1896". It was also used by artillery and cavalry units of the Esercito. It was used only shortly until the adoption of the Mauser-Vergueiro, and most were then sent to the colonies. The AE (Arsenal do Esercito) made "M96" 6,5x53R ammo well into the 1930s.

This is the original rimmed or "flanged" cartridge designed by Steyr-Mannlicher for the Romanian and the Dutch military. In the family of Mannlicher cartridges, it is directly related to and the precursor of the later Greek 6.5×54mm Mannlicher–Schönauer rimless cartridge with which it is ballistically identical.

In the military service rifles, these cartridges are loaded primarily by using the Mannlicher designed en-bloc clip as used in the German Gewehr 1888 "Commission" rifle. These pre-date and are similar in concept to the clip used later by the US Army's M1 Garand. With the Ferdinand Mannlicher designed trigger guard / magazine housing assembly, when the bolt is open and fully retracted to the rear the full en-bloc clip is loaded into the magazine from the top through the open receiver. The empty clip will fall out through a hole in the base of the magazine housing when out of cartridges, enabling quick reloading of the rifles during combat. Also when the bolt is fully open, full clips can be vigorously ejected upwards from the magazine housing by means of a spring loaded latch at the rear of the magazine, operated by a recessed button in the front of the trigger guard portion of the assembly. The clips were essentially disposable as ammunition would be issued already loaded into clips from the factory.

The .256 Mannlicher cartridge also saw use as a sporting round. The elephant hunter W. D. M. Bell was fond of a Mannlicher M1893 rifle in .256 Mannlicher, (from renowned English gunmaker George Gibbs), that he used to hunt for meat in Africa.

Additional case dimensions

Based on direct measurement of Dutch and German unfired ammunition averaged and compared to published original sources:

6.5×53R (.256 Dutch-Mannlicher)	Imperial (in.)	Metric (mm)
Shoulder Angle	25 deg	
Length to Shoulder	1.59	40.32
Length to Neck	1.77	45.00

Surplus WW2 and earlier ammunition is still available on the collector market, but these are primarily corrosive in nature and rifles fired using it will require a thorough cleaning to reduce the development of rust. 6.5x53mmR caliber pre-WW2 Dutch and Romanian rifles are still commonly available on the collector and surplus markets, and sport and recreational shooters can still enjoy using these "early modern rifles". Due to very close dimensional relationships, boxer-primed cartridge cases can be made by resizing and trimming .303 British or .30-40 Krag (.30-40 US) brass, and Fire forming the resulting altered brass cases in the 6.5x53R chamber. Alteration of the original 6.5×53mmR caliber chamber by re-chambering the rifle barrel with a 6.5x57R (see:6.5×57mm Mauser) chamber reamer has also been done, but the overall length of the original 6.5×53mmR Dutch or Romanian cartridge has to be maintained by seating the projectile more deeply into the cartridge case to fit the original magazine. In this case, it would also be best practice to retain the C.I.P. 6.5×57mmR upper pressure limit of 3300 Bar to reduce any additional stress on these 80 to 125 year old rifles.

== Firearms chambered in 6.5x53mmR ==
- Romanian Mannlicher 1892
- Romanian Mannlicher 1893
- Dutch Mannlicher 1895 (aka Geweer M.95)
- Portuguese Mannlicher 1896
- KNIL Madsen M.15
- KNIL Madsen M.38
- Schwarzlose MG
- Vickars MG

== Gallery ==
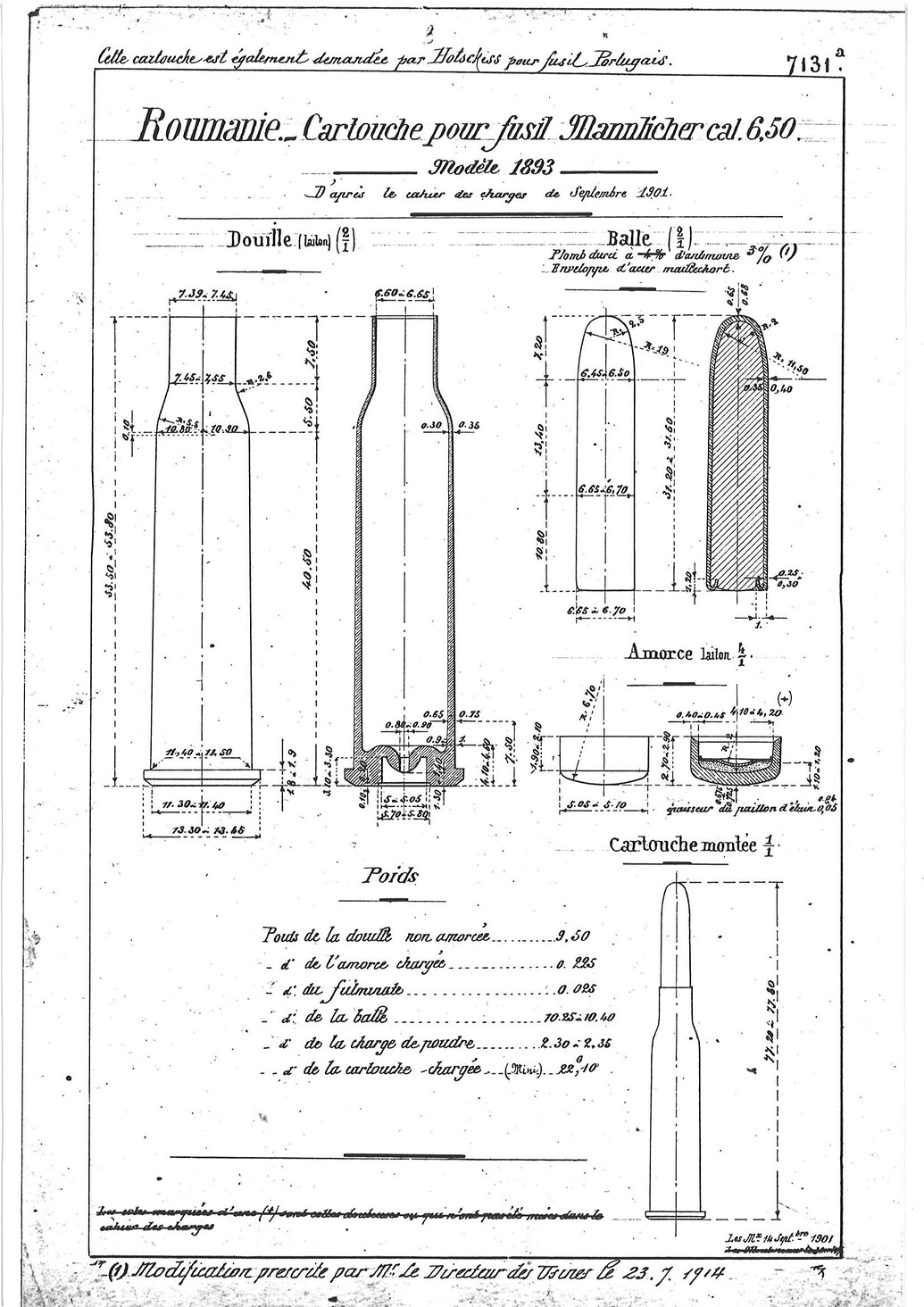
French copy of an original cartridge drawing

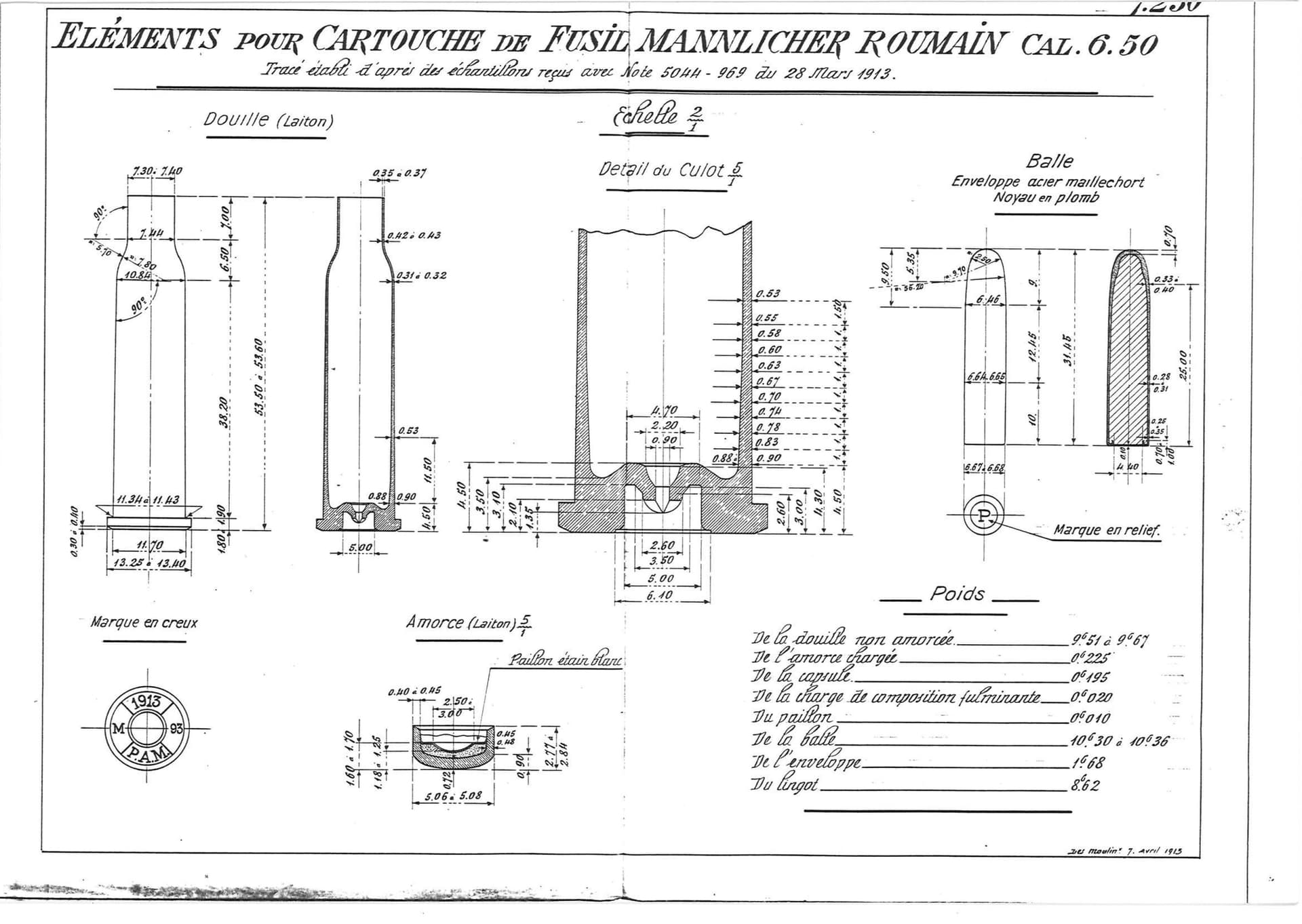
French copy of an original cartridge detail drawing

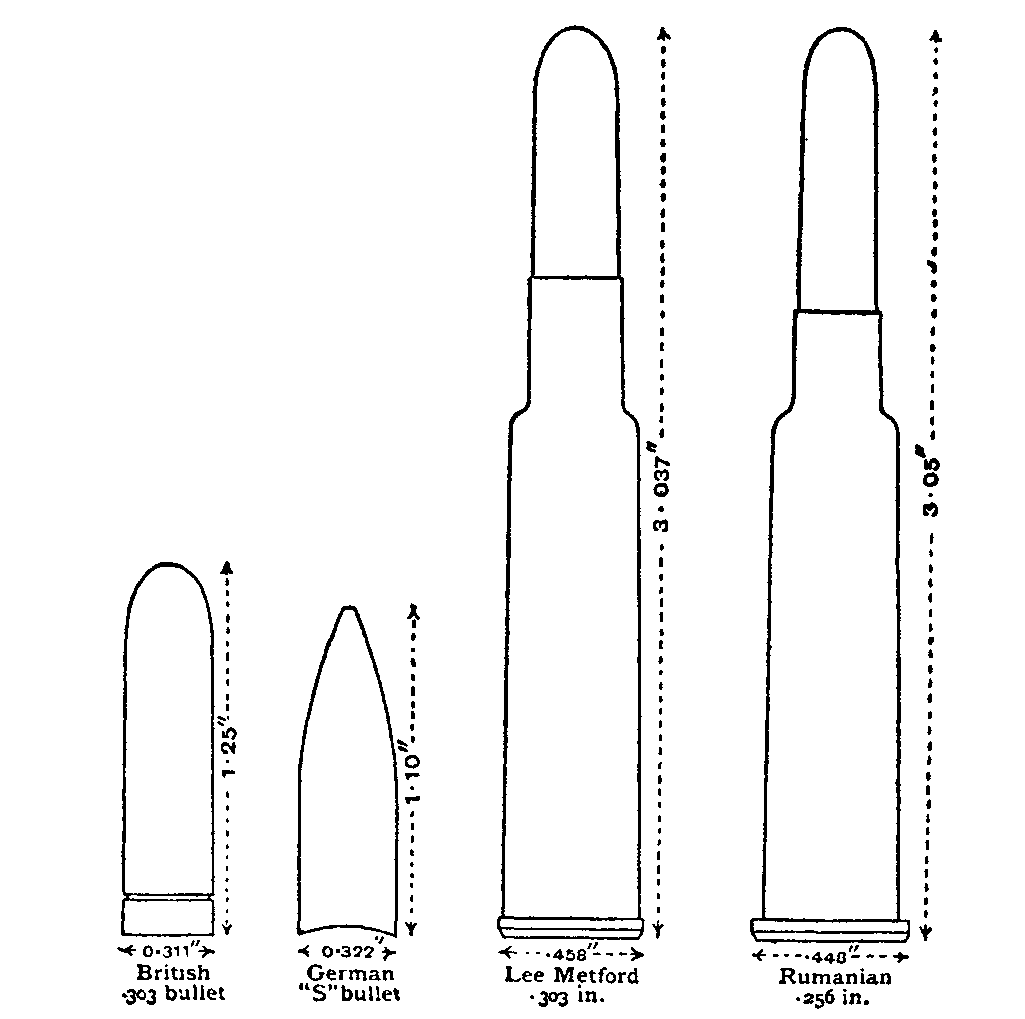
Comparison of .303 British with .256 Mannlicher

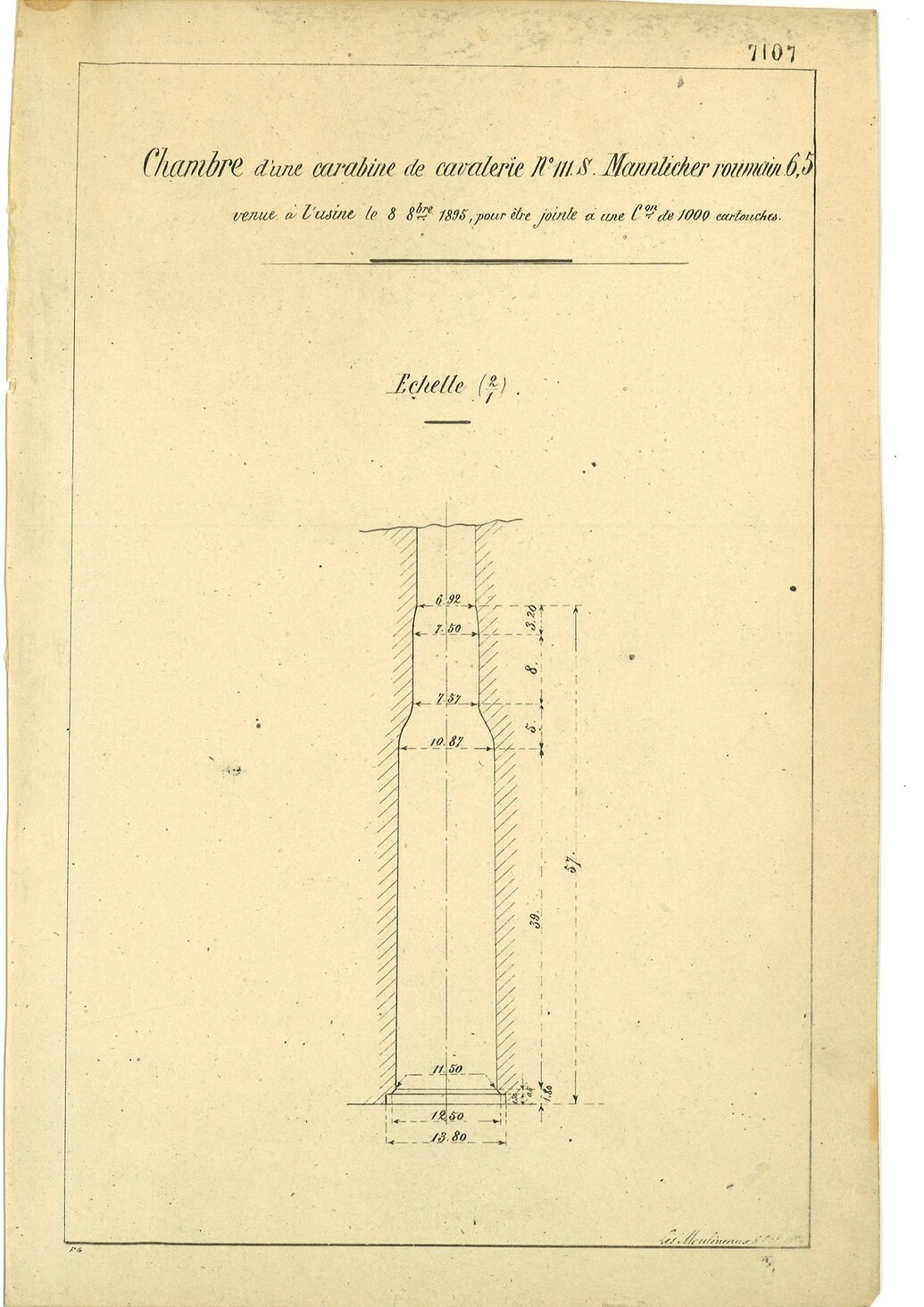
French copy of an original chamber drawing

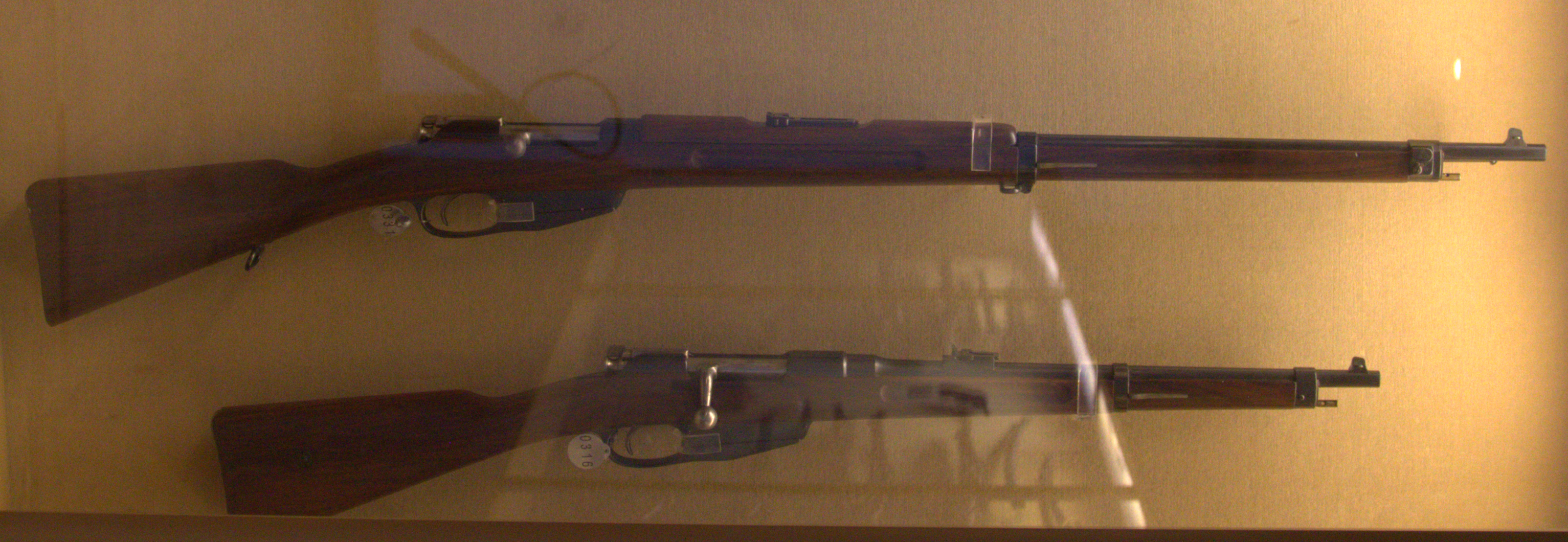
Romanian Mannlicher M1893

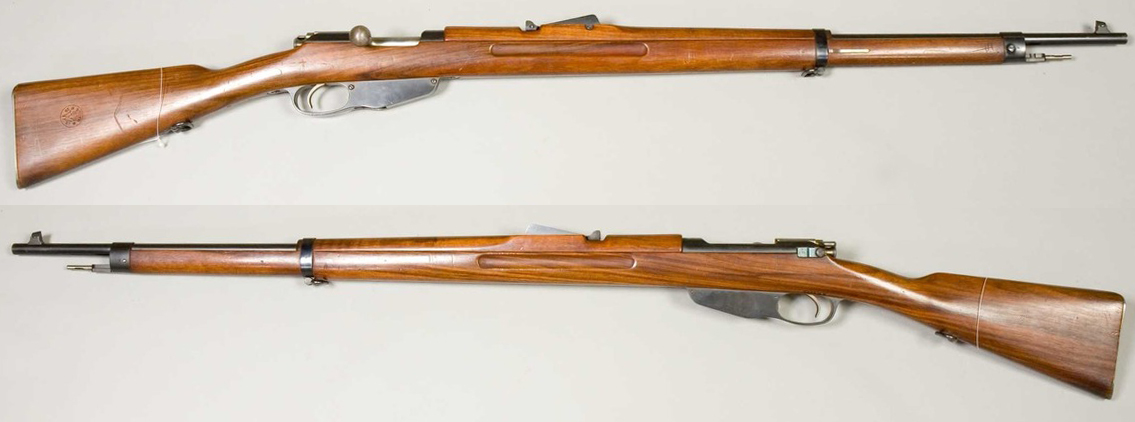
Dutch Mannlicher M1895

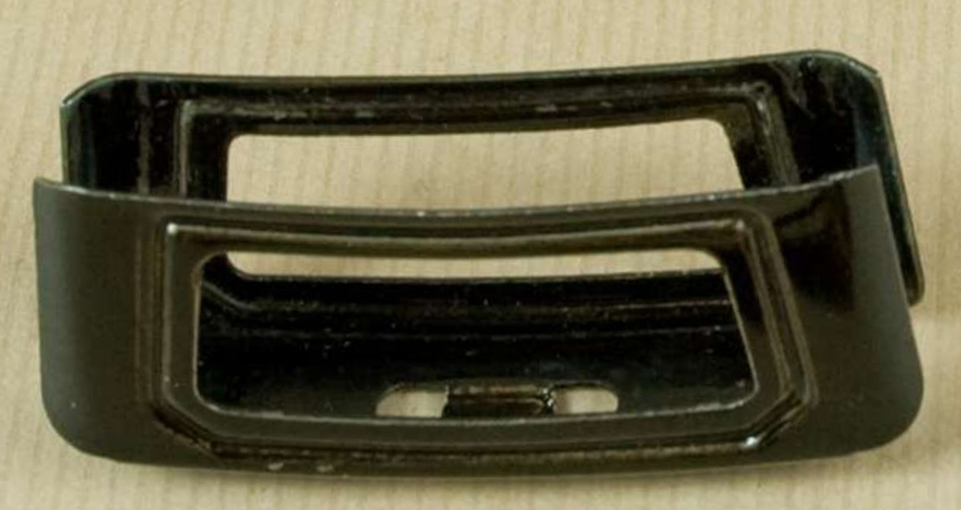
Empty Dutch Mannlicher en-bloc clip

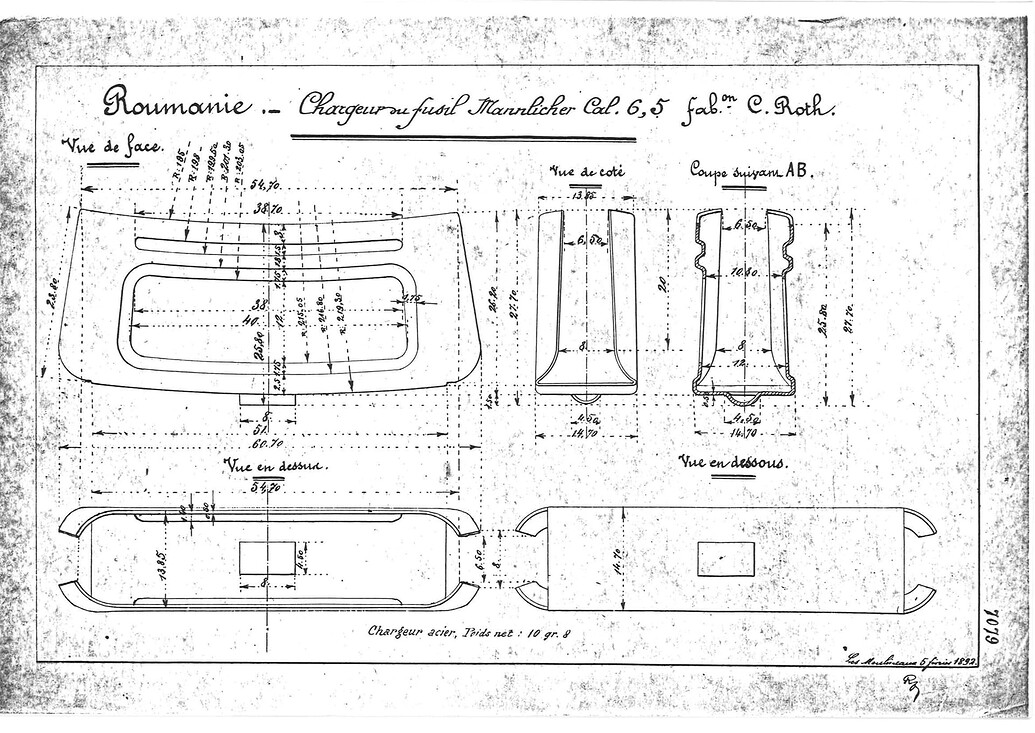
French copy of an original clip drawing

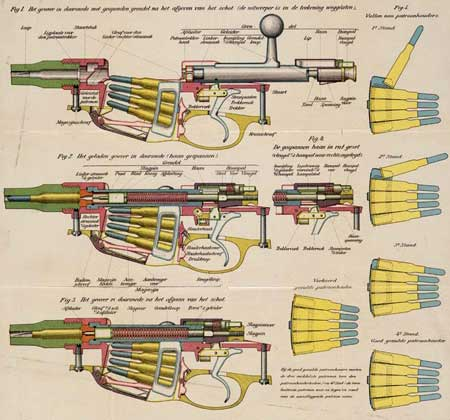
Function diagram of the 6.5x53.5mmR and en-bloc clip

== See also ==
- List of rimmed cartridges
- Table of handgun and rifle cartridges
- 6.5×54mm Mannlicher–Schönauer
- 6.5×57mmR Mauser - see: 6.5×57mm Mauser
- 6.5×55mm Swedish
- 7×57mm Mauser
- .30-40 Krag
- .303 British
