= 6.5×57mm Mauser =

German centerfire rifle cartridge

- Type: Rifle
- Place of origin: Germany

Production history
- Designer: Paul Mauser
- Designed: 1893–1894
- Variants: 6.5x57mmR Mauser

Specifications
- Parent case: 7×57mm Mauser
- Case type: Rimless, bottlenecked
- Bullet diameter: 6.70 mm (0.264 in)
- Land diameter: 6.45 mm (0.254 in)
- Neck diameter: 7.65 mm (0.301 in)
- Shoulder diameter: 10.94 mm (0.431 in)
- Base diameter: 11.90 mm (0.469 in)
- Rim diameter: 11.95 mm (0.470 in)
- Rim thickness: 1.30 mm (0.051 in)
- Case length: 56.70 mm (2.232 in)
- Overall length: 82.00 mm (3.228 in)
- Case capacity: 3.83 cm^{3} (59.1 gr H_{2}O)
- Rifling twist: 200 mm (1 in 7.87")
- Primer type: Large rifle
- Maximum pressure (C.I.P.): 390.0 MPa (56,560 psi)

Ballistic performance
Bullet mass/type	Velocity	Energy
6 g (93 gr) FMJ	1,011.9 m/s (3,320 ft/s)	3,057 J (2,255 ft⋅lbf)
8.2 g (127 gr) SP	868.7 m/s (2,850 ft/s)	3,104 J (2,289 ft⋅lbf)
10 g (154 gr) SP	813.8 m/s (2,670 ft/s)	3,301 J (2,435 ft⋅lbf)
- Sources: C.I.P & Cartridges of the World.

6.5×57mmR Mauser

Production history
- Designer: Paul Mauser
- Designed: 1910

Specifications
- Case type: Rimmed, bottlenecked
- Bullet diameter: 6.70 mm (0.264 in)
- Neck diameter: 7.65 mm (0.301 in)
- Shoulder diameter: 10.94 mm (0.431 in)
- Base diameter: 11.92 mm (0.469 in)
- Rim diameter: 13.32 mm (0.524 in)
- Rim thickness: 1.40 mm (0.055 in)
- Case length: 56.70 mm (2.232 in)
- Overall length: 82.00 mm (3.228 in)
- Case capacity: 3.83 cm^{3} (59.1 gr H_{2}O)
- Rifling twist: 200 mm (1 in 7.87")
- Primer type: Large rifle
- Maximum pressure (C.I.P.): 330.0 MPa (47,860 psi)

The 6.5×57mm Mauser (designated as the 6,5 × 57 by the C.I.P.) is a smokeless powder rimless bottlenecked centerfire rifle cartridge developed by Paul Mauser and introduced in 1893–94.

== Overview ==
The 6.5×57mm Mauser was designed and introduced by Mauser in either 1893 or 1894 for use as a sporting cartridge, created by necking down the 7×57mm Mauser. Due to high recognition of 7.92 mm Patrone 88, the presumed parent to the 7×57mm, it was marketed as M88/57/6.5 mit und ohne Rand in 1920s.

The 6.5×57mm Mauser never saw military service with any power, but it influenced the design of a number of 6.5mm military cartridges such as the 6.5×58mm Vergueiro. Several wildcat cartridges have subsequently been created from the 7×57mm Mauser with almost identical calibre bullets, such as the .257 Roberts, but are not interchangeable. The .256 Gibbs Magnum was created by reducing the neck of the 6.5×57mm Mauser by 2 mm.

One famous user of the 6.5×57mm Mauser was Pete Pearson, who used a rifle in this calibre for hunting in Africa. Pearson typically used his .577 Nitro Express double rifle for hunting dangerous game, but on occasion he did use the 6.5×57mm Mauser to hunt dangerous game up to and including elephant.

The C.I.P. rates the maximum standard pressure for this 6,5 × 57 caliber at Pmax = 3900 bar

== 6.5×57mmR Mauser rimmed variant ==
The 6.5×57mmR Mauser (designated as the 6,5 × 57 R by the C.I.P.) is a rimmed variant of the 6.5×57mm Mauser. The rimmed variant was designed for Break action or break-open rifles and is almost identical to the rimless variant except for the rim and a significant lower P_{max} piezo pressure. After WW2, one of the types of German hunting firearms that created interest among GI's were the multi-barrel firearms used as flexible hunting tools. These all-in-one Combination guns like the M30 Luftwaffe drilling would have a mix of multiple barrels in rifle calibers and shotgun gauges in order to provide that flexibility for the hunter. Three barrel "Drilling" and four barrel "Vierling" firearms may have at least one rifle barrel with a 6.5×57mmR chamber, as per German law, that was the minimum caliber for hunting red deer and was quite capable for most other European game. But due to the Break action mechanism in which the breech of the firearm would lock, a reduced power rimmed cartridge would be used. C.I.P. rates this 6,5 x 57 R Rimmed variant at Pmax = 3300 bar, 600 bar lower than the rimless parent cartridge.

== See also ==
- List of rifle cartridges
