= .242 Rimless Nitro Express =

UK centerfire rifle cartridge

- Type: Rifle
- Place of origin: United Kingdom

Production history
- Designer: Kynoch
- Designed: 1923
- Produced: 1923–present

Specifications
- Case type: Rimless, bottleneck
- Bullet diameter: .253 in (6.4 mm)
- Neck diameter: .281 in (7.1 mm)
- Shoulder diameter: .405 in (10.3 mm)
- Base diameter: .465 in (11.8 mm)
- Rim diameter: .465 in (11.8 mm)
- Case length: 2.38 in (60 mm)
- Overall length: 3.2 in (81 mm)
- Primer type: .217/54

Ballistic performance
Bullet mass/type	Velocity	Energy
100 gr (6 g)	2,800 ft/s (850 m/s)	1,740 ft⋅lbf (2,360 J)
- Source: Cartridges of the World.

The .242 Rimless Nitro Express, also known as the .242 Vickers and initially called the .242 Manton, was a rimless bottleneck centerfire rifle cartridge developed by Kynoch for J. Manton & Co of Calcutta and introduced in 1923.

The .242 Rimless is very similar to the .243 Winchester in performance, although the cartridge is significantly longer. It fired a 100 gr projectile at 2800 fps.

.242 Vickers Performance Comparison
Cartridge	Bullet weight	Muzzle velocity	Muzzle energy
.242 Rimless Nitro Express	100 gr (6.5 g)	2,800 ft/s (850 m/s)	1,740 ft⋅lbf (2,360 J)
.240 Apex	100 gr (6.5 g)	2,900 ft/s (880 m/s)	1,865 ft⋅lbf (2,529 J)
.240 Weatherby Magnum	100 gr (6.5 g)	3,406 ft/s (1,038 m/s)	2,576 ft⋅lbf (3,493 J)
.243 Winchester	100 gr (6.5 g)	2,960 ft/s (900 m/s)	1,945 ft⋅lbf (2,637 J)
.243 Winchester Super Short Magnum	100 gr (6.5 g)	3,110 ft/s (950 m/s)	2,147 ft⋅lbf (2,911 J)
.244 H&H Magnum	100 gr (6.5 g)	3,500 ft/s (1,100 m/s)	2,720 ft⋅lbf (3,690 J)
.246 Purdey	100 gr (6.5 g)	2,950 ft/s (900 m/s)	1,930 ft⋅lbf (2,620 J)
6 mm Lee Navy	100 gr (6.5 g)	2,680 ft/s (820 m/s)	1,595 ft⋅lbf (2,163 J)
6 mm Remington	100 gr (6.5 g)	3,100 ft/s (940 m/s)	2,133 ft⋅lbf (2,892 J)

== See also ==
- Nitro Express
- List of rifle cartridges
- 6mm rifle cartridges
