= .246 Purdey =

Centerfire rifle cartridge

- Type: Rifle
- Place of origin: United Kingdom

Production history
- Designer: James Purdey & Sons
- Designed: 1921
- Produced: 1921–present

Specifications
- Case type: Rimmed, bottleneck
- Bullet diameter: .253 in (6.4 mm)
- Neck diameter: .283 in (7.2 mm)
- Shoulder diameter: .401 in (10.2 mm)
- Base diameter: .474 in (12.0 mm)
- Rim diameter: .544 in (13.8 mm)
- Case length: 2.24 in (57 mm)
- Overall length: 2.93 in (74 mm)

Ballistic performance
Bullet mass/type	Velocity	Energy
100 gr (6 g)	2,950 ft/s (900 m/s)	1,930 ft⋅lbf (2,620 J)
- Sources: Cartridges of the World & Shooter's bible guide to reloading.

The .246 Purdey, also known as the .246 Flanged, is an obsolete centerfire rifle cartridge developed by James Purdey & Sons and introduced in 1921.

== Overview ==
The .246 Purdey is a rimmed cartridge originally designed for use in Purdey's own double rifles. Never popular or widely used, the cartridge offers slightly less power than the .243 Winchester.

As is common with cartridges designed for double rifles, the .246 Purdey was offered in one loading, firing a 100 gr projectile at 2950 fps.

.246 Flanged Performance Comparison
Cartridge	Bullet weight	Muzzle velocity	Muzzle energy
.246 Purdey	100 gr (6.5 g)	2,950 ft/s (900 m/s)	1,930 ft⋅lbf (2,620 J)
.240 Apex	100 gr (6.5 g)	2,900 ft/s (880 m/s)	1,865 ft⋅lbf (2,529 J)
.240 Weatherby Magnum	100 gr (6.5 g)	3,406 ft/s (1,038 m/s)	2,576 ft⋅lbf (3,493 J)
.242 Rimless Nitro Express	100 gr (6.5 g)	2,800 ft/s (850 m/s)	1,740 ft⋅lbf (2,360 J)
.243 Winchester	100 gr (6.5 g)	2,960 ft/s (900 m/s)	1,945 ft⋅lbf (2,637 J)
.243 Winchester Super Short Magnum	100 gr (6.5 g)	3,110 ft/s (950 m/s)	2,147 ft⋅lbf (2,911 J)
.244 H&H Magnum	100 gr (6.5 g)	3,500 ft/s (1,100 m/s)	2,720 ft⋅lbf (3,690 J)
6 mm Lee Navy	100 gr (6.5 g)	2,680 ft/s (820 m/s)	1,595 ft⋅lbf (2,163 J)
6 mm Remington	100 gr (6.5 g)	3,100 ft/s (940 m/s)	2,133 ft⋅lbf (2,892 J)

== See also ==
- List of rifle cartridges
- 6 mm rifle cartridges
