= .240 Apex =

UK sporting rifle cartridge

.240 Magnum Rimless
- Type: Rifle
- Place of origin: England

Production history
- Designer: Holland & Holland
- Designed: 1919
- Manufacturer: Holland & Holland

Specifications
- Case type: Belted, bottleneck
- Bullet diameter: .245 in (6.2 mm)
- Neck diameter: .274 in (7.0 mm)
- Shoulder diameter: .403 in (10.2 mm)
- Base diameter: .450 in (11.4 mm)
- Rim diameter: .467 in (11.9 mm)
- Rim thickness: .035 in (0.89 mm)
- Case length: 2.49 in (63 mm)
- Overall length: 3.21 in (82 mm)
- Primer type: Kynoch # 81

Ballistic performance
Bullet mass/type	Velocity	Energy
100 gr (6 g) SP	2,900 ft/s (880 m/s)	1,865 ft⋅lbf (2,529 J)
- Source: Cartridges of the World.

.240 Magnum Flanged

Specifications
- Case type: Rimmed, bottleneck
- Bullet diameter: .245 in (6.2 mm)
- Neck diameter: .274 in (7.0 mm)
- Shoulder diameter: .402 in (10.2 mm)
- Base diameter: .448 in (11.4 mm)
- Rim diameter: .513 in (13.0 mm)
- Rim thickness: UNK
- Case length: 2.5 in (64 mm)
- Overall length: 3.25 in (83 mm)
- Primer type: Kynoch # 81

Ballistic performance
Bullet mass/type	Velocity	Energy
100 gr (6 g) SN	2,775 ft/s (846 m/s)	1,711 ft⋅lbf (2,320 J)
- Test barrel length: 28; Source: Kynoch

The .240 Magnum Rimless Holland & Holland (also known as the .240 Apex and the .240 Super Express) is a centrefire sporting rifle cartridge developed in English gunmakers Holland & Holland no later than 1919, primarily for use in hunting deer and plains game.

As it was common for rimless hunting cartridges, a rimmed (beltless) variant, at the time called just "Holland's 240 Super Express" and now sometimes named .240 Flanged Magnum or .240 H&H Flanged, was developed simultaneously for break-barrel rifles and combination guns.

== Overview ==
The ballistic performance of the .240 H&H in factory loads is very similar to that of the .243 Winchester, with a 100-grain (6.5 g) bullet with a diameter of .245 inches (contrary to the .240 name) giving a muzzle velocity of approximately 2,900 feet per second (880 m/s). When it is loaded at the same pressure as the .243 WSSM using modern powders, the .240 H&H has the potential for slightly better performance.

Most bolt-action rifles made for the .240 H&H will be amply strong enough to handle hand-loaded cartridges at high pressure.

.240 H&H Performance Comparison
Cartridge	Bullet weight	Muzzle velocity	Muzzle energy
.240 H&H Magnum	100 gr (6.5 g)	2,900 ft/s (880 m/s)	1,865 ft⋅lbf (2,529 J)
.240 Weatherby Magnum	100 gr (6.5 g)	3,406 ft/s (1,038 m/s)	2,576 ft⋅lbf (3,493 J)
.242 Rimless Nitro Express	100 gr (6.5 g)	2,800 ft/s (850 m/s)	1,740 ft⋅lbf (2,360 J)
.243 Winchester	100 gr (6.5 g)	2,960 ft/s (900 m/s)	1,945 ft⋅lbf (2,637 J)
.243 Winchester Super Short Magnum	100 gr (6.5 g)	3,110 ft/s (950 m/s)	2,147 ft⋅lbf (2,911 J)
.244 H&H Magnum	100 gr (6.5 g)	3,500 ft/s (1,100 m/s)	2,720 ft⋅lbf (3,690 J)
.246 Purdey	100 gr (6.5 g)	2,950 ft/s (900 m/s)	1,930 ft⋅lbf (2,620 J)
6 mm Lee Navy	100 gr (6.5 g)	2,680 ft/s (820 m/s)	1,595 ft⋅lbf (2,163 J)
6 mm Remington	100 gr (6.5 g)	3,100 ft/s (940 m/s)	2,133 ft⋅lbf (2,892 J)

== See also ==
- List of rifle cartridges
- 6 mm caliber
