= Lloyd rifle =

- Place of origin: UK

Production history
- Designer: David Llewellyn Lloyd
- Manufacturer: Lloyd Rifle Company

Specifications
- Calibre: .244 H&H Magnum, .264 Winchester Magnum and .25-06 Remington
- Action: Mauser-type bolt action
- Feed system: Box magazine
- Sights: Patented system of integral mounts for scopes only

The Lloyd Rifle was the 1950s brainchild of English deer-stalker, rifleman, metallurgist and engineer David Llewellyn Lloyd. His objective was to create a high-quality, scope-sighted, magazine-fed sporting rifle capable of dependably high accuracy at long ranges, of retaining its zero despite rough handling, and of firing modern high-intensity, flat shooting cartridges such as the .244 H&H Magnum (which Lloyd himself developed) and the .264 Winchester Magnum.

== Design ==
=== Requirement ===
As an enthusiastic stalker of Highland Red deer on his family's own deer forest at Glencassley, and elsewhere in northern Scotland - he killed more than 5,000 Red deer stags in a career lasting some 60 years - Lloyd sought a rifle which would shoot high powered cartridges giving an exceptionally flat trajectory and significant long range hitting power, to make it straightforward to take shots out to 300 yards and more on very sloping, mountainous terrain, without the need for very precise range-judging. A very early convert to the use of scope sights in the conservative world of British deerstalking, Lloyd was impatient with the weak scope mounting systems available in the early 20th century, and sought a solution.

=== Mauser action ===
For his preferred rifle action Lloyd selected the Mauser 98 bolt-action, for its inherent strength and proven potential for accuracy, and on his rifles only the bolt face (to suit the cartridge) and the back-swept bolt handle were modified from the Mauser norm.

=== Telescopic sight ===
Integral to the Lloyd rifle was a telescopic sight - indeed, Lloyd rifles came with no iron sights, and no provision for fitting them without some difficulty - and the majority of Lloyd rifles were delivered to their owners fitted with fixed-power scopes, usually of 4× or 6× magnification, by makers such as Habicht, Zeiss, Swarovski and Hensoldt. The scope was held in a specially designed, integral, immensely strong, receiver-enshrouding mount which positioned it very low over the action, and gripped both the scope and the rifle action in massive rings of steel. Lloyd held UK Patent Number 646419 for this design.

With this scope attachment - indeed, integration - system, Lloyd's intention was to create a rifle which was, so far as humanly possible, immune to the shocks, bumps and jars that so often knocked the scopes on other rifles seriously out of alignment. The objective was to have a rifle which, once completed, could be zeroed for a selected cartridge load and a chosen zero distance, and which would faithfully hold that zero from outing to outing, and even from one shooting season to another. "I want a stable platform from which to shoot," Lloyd said. In his quest for this tenacity of zero, he was largely successful, and many of his customers reported that they had never found it necessary to make any adjustment whatsoever to their rifles' sights over many years of use. There are also reports of Lloyd rifles having successfully survived serious mishaps such as falls from considerable heights, and even being run over by vehicles, without losing zero.

=== Barrels and stocks ===
Most of Lloyd's barrels were made under contract by Vickers Armstrong Ltd. and the Mauser 98 actions were prepared by Holland & Holland. Although Lloyd enjoyed sourcing the walnut for the rifles' stocks himself, visiting growers and dealers across Europe, many of the rifles were stocked-up by Wisemans. In making rifles, Lloyd also had close working relationships with the firms of W. W. Greener, Webley & Scott, W.J. Jeffery, John Rigby and John Wilkes.

Externally, the Lloyd rifle is characterized by a streamlined profile, with the scope mounted low above the action and a stock designed for both appearance and handling. The stocks were typically made from dark French walnut. Lloyd personally selected walnut from suppliers in Europe, with assistance from his wife, Evadne.("Bobby" - the longest-serving governor in the history of the Royal Shakespeare Company)

== Influence ==
The Lloyd rifle was initially marketed as the "David Lloyd Telescope Sighted Deer Stalking Rifle". David Lloyd had a private 400-yard rifle range in the grounds of his ancestral home, Pipewell Hall, Northamptonshire, and used it to set the zero of all his rifles before delivery to their owners.

Lloyd rifles, and the .244 H&H Magnum cartridge, were influential in sporting firearms and cartridge design and development in the mid-20th century. Both were widely admired by British deer-stalking enthusiasts and international sporting arms experts, and were owned and used by, among others, Bill Ruger, Roy Weatherby, Lord "Skips" Riverdale, the Marquess of Linlithgow and Mrs Patricia Strutt, doyenne of British lady stalkers with a lifetime's bag of over 2,000 stags, who ordered one for her 75th birthday and used it up to her death aged 89.

Shooting Times magazine voted the Lloyd rifle number 8 in its lineup of the Top 12 Rifles of All Time (the Kalashnikov AK-47 came number 7), and Country Life declared Lloyd himself to be a "National Living Treasure".

Lloyd rifles are generally accurate, with most shooting to 1.5 MOA or better; but the massive scope mounts integral to the Lloyd concept had the effect of bending and torquing the rifles' actions out of blueprint. This inevitably caused stresses and imperfections, preventing the rifles achieving the full precision accuracy potential of the cartridges used. But within the approximately 300 yard ranges for which they had been designed and zeroed, Lloyd's rifles in fast magnum calibres performed very well.

The majority of Lloyd rifles were chambered in .244 H&H Magnum, .264 Winchester Magnum and .25-06 Remington.

== Company ==
Lloyd's wife Evadne took over the Lloyd Rifle Company in 1996 on David's death, and ran it until her own death in 2003. The company was then briefly owned by John Shirley, a former Technical Director of James Purdey and Sons of London, and its name, goodwill and records were later offered for sale by him at auction in London on 14 December 2006.
