= .240 Weatherby Magnum =

Rifle cartridge

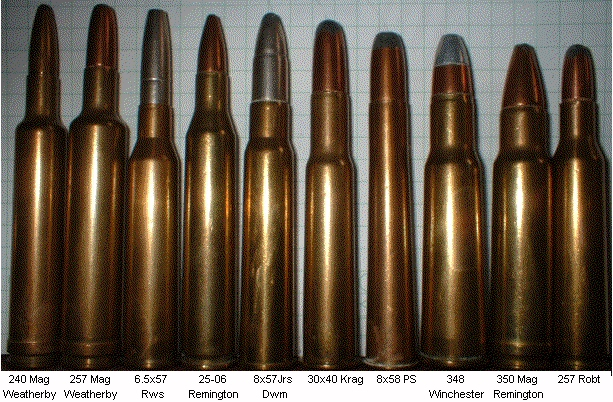
- .240 Weatherby Magnum (1st from left)
- Type: Rifle
- Place of origin: USA

Production history
- Designer: Roy Weatherby
- Designed: 1968
- Manufacturer: Weatherby

Specifications
- Case type: Belted, bottleneck
- Bullet diameter: .243 in (6.2 mm)
- Neck diameter: .272 in (6.9 mm)
- Shoulder diameter: .429 in (10.9 mm)
- Base diameter: .453 in (11.5 mm)
- Rim diameter: .472 in (12.0 mm)
- Case length: 2.496 in (63.4 mm)
- Overall length: 3.100 in (78.7 mm)
- Case capacity: 64 gr H_{2}O (4.1 cm^{3})
- Rifling twist: 1 in 10 in (250 mm)
- Primer type: Large rifle
- Maximum pressure: 65,000 psi (450 MPa)

Ballistic performance
Bullet mass/type	Velocity	Energy
60 gr (3.9 g) HP	3,817 ft/s (1,163 m/s)	1,942 ft⋅lbf (2,633 J)
75 gr (4.9 g) HP	3,555 ft/s (1,084 m/s)	2,105 ft⋅lbf (2,854 J)
80 gr (5.2 g) SP	3,514 ft/s (1,071 m/s)	2,194 ft⋅lbf (2,975 J)
90 gr (5.8 g) SP	3,394 ft/s (1,034 m/s)	2,303 ft⋅lbf (3,122 J)
100 gr (6.5 g) HP	3,202 ft/s (976 m/s)	2,277 ft⋅lbf (3,087 J)

The .240 Weatherby Magnum was developed in 1968 by Roy Weatherby. In the development of his own .240in/6 mm cartridge, Weatherby was significantly influenced by both the success and the limitations of the .244 H&H Magnum cartridge devised in England by his friend and colleague David Lloyd. It was the last cartridge to be designed by Roy Weatherby.

== Design ==
The .240 Weatherby Mag. is a proprietary cartridge used only in Weatherby rifles. This particular Weatherby case is unique: other than shape, it isn't physically based on other Weatherby cases, having the same rim diameter and a similar length to the .30-06. It utilizes the traditional Weatherby rounded double shoulder and a belted case with a length of 2.496in, significantly shorter than the 2.8in case of the .244 H&H Mag.

== Performance ==
In terms of velocity, the .240 Weatherby Magnum was once the fastest commercially produced 6 mm cartridge. There were several faster wildcat rounds available, but the .240 Wby. Mag. outclassed the 6 mm Remington and the newer .243 WSSM by about 150 ft/s (46 m/s). However, the lightweight .243 WSSM 55gr Ballistic Silvertip now outpaces Weatherby's offerings according to some. Loading data from Western Powders puts the .240 Wby. Mag. at over 4,000 ft/s (1,200 m/s) with a 62 grain Barnes bullet.

While favoured by some varmint hunters, the .240 Wby. Mag. is not much liked by some reloaders because the case cannot be formed out of any other brass; one either has to buy Weatherby ammunition or reload used Weatherby cases which tend to be more expensive than those for more common cartridges. With heavier bullets the .240 Wby. Mag. makes for a good deer hunting cartridge, but it does tend to require a long (>23 inches (580 mm).) barrel in order to achieve peak performance.

Performance for 100 grain bullet from utilizing a factory 26" test barrel and a Nosler Partition bullet)
	Muzzle	100 yd	200 yd	300 yd	400 yd	500 yd
Trajectory		2.8	3.5	0	-8.4	-22.9
Energy (ft·lbf)	2576	2183	1844	1550	1294	1073
Velocity (ft/s)	3406	3136	2882	2642	2415	2199

.240 Weatherby Performance Comparison
Cartridge	Bullet weight	Muzzle velocity	Muzzle energy
.240 Weatherby Magnum	100 gr (6.5 g)	3,406 ft/s (1,038 m/s)	2,576 ft⋅lbf (3,493 J)
.240 Apex	100 gr (6.5 g)	2,900 ft/s (880 m/s)	1,865 ft⋅lbf (2,529 J)
.242 Rimless Nitro Express	100 gr (6.5 g)	2,800 ft/s (850 m/s)	1,740 ft⋅lbf (2,360 J)
.243 Winchester	100 gr (6.5 g)	2,960 ft/s (900 m/s)	1,945 ft⋅lbf (2,637 J)
.243 Winchester Super Short Magnum	100 gr (6.5 g)	3,110 ft/s (950 m/s)	2,147 ft⋅lbf (2,911 J)
.244 H&H Magnum	100 gr (6.5 g)	3,500 ft/s (1,100 m/s)	2,720 ft⋅lbf (3,690 J)
.246 Purdey	100 gr (6.5 g)	2,950 ft/s (900 m/s)	1,930 ft⋅lbf (2,620 J)
6 mm Lee Navy	100 gr (6.5 g)	2,680 ft/s (820 m/s)	1,595 ft⋅lbf (2,163 J)
6 mm Remington	100 gr (6.5 g)	3,100 ft/s (940 m/s)	2,133 ft⋅lbf (2,892 J)

== See also ==
- List of rifle cartridges
- Table of handgun and rifle cartridges
