= 6 mm XC =

US rimless rifle cartridge

6mm XC
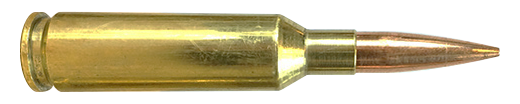
- 6 mm XC cartridge
- Type: Rifle
- Place of origin: United States

Production history
- Designer: David Tubb
- Manufacturer: Commercially by Norma

Specifications
- Parent case: .250 Savage
- Case type: Rimless, Bottleneck
- Bullet diameter: 6.17 mm (0.243 in)
- Neck diameter: 6.82 mm (0.269 in)
- Shoulder diameter: 11.42 mm (0.450 in)
- Base diameter: 11.84 mm (0.466 in)
- Rim diameter: 11.86 mm (0.467 in)
- Rim thickness: 1.22 mm (0.048 in)
- Case length: 48.1 mm (1.89 in)
- Overall length: 63.4 mm (2.50 in)
- Case capacity: 3.24 cm^{3} (50.0 gr H_{2}O)
- Primer type: large rifle

Ballistic performance
Bullet mass/type	Velocity	Energy
95 gr (6 g) Nosler Ballistic Tip	2,953 ft/s (900 m/s)	1,840 ft⋅lbf (2,490 J)
95 gr (6 g) Norma Jaktmatch FMJ	2,953 ft/s (900 m/s)	1,840 ft⋅lbf (2,490 J)
100 gr (6 g) Norma Oryx Bonded SP	2,953 ft/s (900 m/s)	1,937 ft⋅lbf (2,626 J)

6mm XC / 6.17x48mm (also known as 6XC) is a rifle cartridge, similar to the 6x47mm Swiss Match.

== History ==
The 6mm XC was initially developed as a Wildcat cartridge specifically for NRA High Power match shooting by 11-time US National Champion David Tubb. The round originated from chambering a barrel using a .243 Winchester reamer held short, with the case reformed from .22-250. The round is optimised for bullets heavier than 100 grains to improve performance at long ranges - .243Win typically uses bullets lighter than 100 grains. It is touted as being one of the most accurate long-range 6 mm rounds in the world that is designed for repeating rifles.

The 6XC is now a CIP standardized case. The origin is listed as Sweden since Norma standardised the case. Factory brass is available from Norma and Peterson.

== Performance ==
6 mm XC diagram in Inches

The 6XC is a 1000-yard cartridge, comparable to benchrest calibers such as 6x47mm Swiss Match, 6.5×47mm Lapua and 6 mm/22-250; it fits into cartridge class that exceeds the velocities of benchrest calibers such as 6mm BR Remington, 6mm BRX and 6mm Dasher. David Tubb has claimed several wins with the 6XC in NRA High Power National Championships and a number of NRA Long Range championship events (1000 yard events).

=== Muzzle velocity ===
- 7.45 g (115 gr) Hollow Point Boat Tail (HPBT): 3,000 ft/s (910 m/s)

== See also ==
- List of firearms
- List of handgun cartridges
- List of rifle cartridges
- List of individual weapons of the U.S. Armed Forces
