= Ruger Red Label =

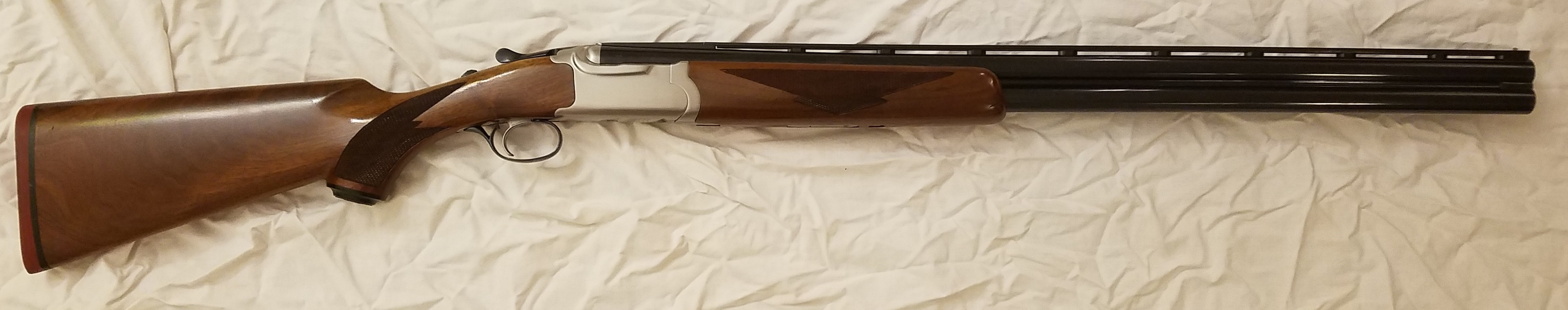
- 12 gauge Red Label, 1st generation
- Type: Double barreled shotgun
- Place of origin: United States

Production history
- Manufacturer: Sturm, Ruger
- Produced: 1978 – 2011; 2013 - 2014; 2026 - Present
- No. built: 150,000
- Variants: 35

Specifications
- Mass: 6.5 lb (2.9 kg)
- Length: 45–49 in (110–120 cm)
- Barrel length: 26 in (66 cm); 28 in (71 cm); 30 in (76 cm)
- Caliber: 12, 20 or 28 gauge
- Action: Break-action
- Sights: Brass Bead

The Ruger Red Label is an over and under shotgun sold by Sturm, Ruger & Co. at the direction of William B. Ruger.

== History ==
When the Browning Superposed was introduced in 1931, American sportsmen soon fell in love with the concept of a stacked barrel double gun. Unlike traditional side-by-side double barrel shotguns that have issues with aiming points and recoil, a shotgun with two barrels stacked one on top of the other offers a single sighting plane and lighter recoil. The Superposed became the first mass-produced Over/Under (O/U) shotgun. By the 1970s the Belgian-made Browning Superposed, and other over and under shotguns imported from Europe had become so expensive that they were out of reach of most American shooters, and there were no domestically produced over and under shotguns that did not cost more.

The Red Label was introduced in 1977 in 20 Gauge with a 26" barrel for a price of $480 (equal to $2,074.95 in 2018) At the time, the Remington Model 3200 was the only other high-quality, American-made over-under shotgun, and it was nearly twice as expensive. The Red Label quickly became a hit with the American shooting public for its affordability, reliability, and handling. It remained in production for over three decades. In 1979, Ruger began to offer the Red Label in 12 Gauge and eventually a scaled-down version in 28 Gauge (1994). The shotgun's design stemmed from William B. Ruger's vision of creating a high-quality, American-made over-and-under shotgun. In order to achieve this and put quality on par with hand-made European shotguns, Ruger invested in expensive machinery to do most of the work.

== Design ==
The Red Label originally featured a blued receiver. Later models utilized a stainless steel receiver with hammer forged barrels. The shooter could determine which barrel to fire by means of a selector mounted on the tang. Early production models typically had fixed chokes but most Red Labels manufactured since the mid-1980s were tapped to accept screw in choke tubes for various purposes. The butt stock and forend are oil-finished American walnut with machine cut checkering on the grip and forend. Stainless steel receivers became standard in 1985.

The Red Label was available with either an English straight stock or a pistol grip stock. The checkering pattern changed several times during the production run. Several variants of the Red Label were offered by Ruger including the Woodside. Introduced in 1995 and produced until 2002, the Ruger Red Label Woodside used select Circassian walnut for its forearm and buttstock, which extended into the action on two side panels. Woodside shotguns were only available in 12 gauge. Ruger also offered an all-weather version of the Red Label with stainless steel barrels and a black, synthetic forearm and buttstock. Hand Engraving at extra cost was offered by several master engravers including John J. Adams, John Adams II, Bryson Gwinnell, Carmine Lombardy, Alvin White, Andrew Bourdin, and Jon Ashford of Ruger.

In 1999 Ruger's 50th Anniversary special CNC cut engraved with 24 kt Gold Birds 28 gauge Grouse, 20 gauge Pheasant, 12 gauge Duck. Later produced CNC cut engraved 28 gauge gold Woodcock, 20 gauge gold Grouse, 12 gauge gold Pheasant and 12 gauge All Weather gold Duck.

The Red Label was primarily intended as a sporting shotgun for waterfowling, upland game hunting as well as in skeet and sporting clays.

== Criticism ==
Criticism of the Red Label included complaints about the weight of the shotgun, poor balance when swinging the gun onto a flying target, poor fit of the metal to wood on some examples, and loose (rattling) sighting ribs. Many shooters disliked the automatic safety (which could be disabled by the factory if requested by the owner.).

== Production decline ==
By 2010, the Red Label's sticker price had grown to $1,899, and production had dropped to only 1,323 guns. Although originally conceived as a quality affordable American made alternative to pricey hand-made European shotguns, competition from imported brands had increased substantially. Production of the Red Label was discontinued by Ruger in 2011.

== Red Label II Redesign ==
A redesigned Red Label, commonly known as the Red Label II, was introduced by Ruger in 2013, though only in 12 gauge. The new version was lighter and featured refined inner workings, a new center of gravity and reduced recoil. These improvements were designed to deliver improved comfort and enhanced shooting performance and make the gun lighter to carry in the field. According to Ruger the new 12 gauge Red Label had a redistributed center of gravity for even greater instinctual swing and pointing. It also featured two-inch extended forcing cones, maximum back-bored barrels and a soft Pachmayr buttpad to enhance the shooting experience with reduced recoil. The suggested retail price for the new Red Label was $1,399 which was approximately $500 less than MSRP of the original when it was discontinued. The price drop was achieved by streamlining the manufacturing processes, making the shotgun less costly to produce.

== Red Label II Final Production ==
In January 2015, Ruger dropped the Red Label from its product line, citing an inability to achieve revenue expectations. With this action, Ruger no longer produced a shotgun in its model line at that time. Accessories and choke tubes for the Ruger Red Label shotgun are still available from Ruger as of 2022.

== Red Label III Introduction ==
On December 24, 2025 Ruger announced the release of the Red Label III. Unlike previous models directly built by Ruger, the Red Label III is built by Connecticut Shotgun Manufacturing Company. Initially it is only available in 20 gauge with the choice between 28 and 30 inch barrels.
