= David Lloyd (riflemaker and sportsman) =

David Llewellyn Lloyd
- Born: David Llewellyn Lloyd; 24 June 1910; Northamptonshire, England
- Died: 24 April 1996 (aged 85); London, England
- Occupation: riflemaker
- Spouse: Evadne Lloyd

David Llewellyn Lloyd (1910-1996) was an English pilot, deer-stalker, ballistician, and sporting rifle maker, of Northamptonshire, England, and Glencassley Estate in Sutherland, Scotland.

Although already an experienced pilot he was considered too old at 29, to be called up for service during the Battle of Britain in the Royal Air Force in the Second World War, instead he became the senior flight controller based at Tangmere, Sussex during the Battle of Britain.

Extensive deer stalking, and frequent rifle shooting visits to Bisley ranges, Lloyd established the David Lloyd & Co. riflemakers company (registered company 05202134) at Pipewell Hall in 1936, and in the early 1950s developed the .244 H&H Magnum rifle cartridge, later adopted by Holland & Holland of London.

Although Lloyd had no formal training as a riflemaker, he employed a team of craftsmen from the London & provincial trade to build the rifles in the workshops at Pipewell Hall.

Lloyd developed the distinctive Lloyd rifle concept, and from the 1960s to the mid-1990s he built magazine-fed sporting rifles based on commercial Mauser 98 & Sako actions with distinctively integral scope sights, capable of dependably high accuracy at long ranges, and of handling modern high-intensity, flat shooting cartridges such as the .244 H&H, the .264 Winchester Magnum and the .25-06 Remington. Lloyd noted that he attached a rifle to a scope, rather than the more normal saying of attaching a scope to a rifle.

Shooting Times voted the Lloyd rifle number 8 in its list of the top 12 Rifles of All Time, and Country Life magazine described Lloyd himself as “a National Living Treasure”. Lloyd rifles are owned by rifle makers Bill Ruger and Roy Weatherby and by several owners of Scottish deer forests.

In his deer-stalking career of over 60 years, Lloyd killed more than 5,000 Scottish highland red deer stags, the vast majority of them with rifles built by his company.

Lloyd's wife Evadne (“Bobby”, the longest-serving governor of the Royal Shakespeare Company in its history) keenly supported him in his business and helped him to source fine walnut blanks for his rifle stocks from various European sources. On Lloyd's death in 1996, she took on the business, which by then was doing little trade, and ran it until she died in 2003 when the company was sold to John Shirley, formerly Technical Manager with James Purdey and Sons of London. He subsequently offered the business name, goodwill, and records of the David Lloyd company for sale at auction in London in December 2006.
