= Blake rifle =

- Type: Bolt-action rifle
- Place of origin: United States

Production history
- Designer: John Henry Blake
- Manufacturer: Blake Rifle Company
- Produced: ca. 1892 - 1910
- No. built: ~300

Specifications
- Mass: 3.99 kg (8.8 lbs)
- Length: 1372 mm (54 in.)
- Barrel length: 762 mm (30 in.)
- Cartridge: .30 Blake
- Action: bolt action
- Feed system: detachable 7-round rotary magazine

The Blake rifle is a bolt-action rifle which uses a unique 7-round rotary magazine. John H. Blake of New York constructed his rifle in response to the fact that very few domestic designs were submitted to US Army rifle trials (1890–93). The rotary magazine was unique because it was detachable, whereas other rifles at the time using similar type of feed used non-detachable rotary magazines (Savage M1892). As such the detachable magazine was often described as a packet, or en-bloc clip, due to the lack of a more proper term at the time.

== History ==
Blake submitted two of his rifles to the trials, both chambered in .30 Blake cartridge — a rimless version of the .30-40 Krag cartridge. On August 19, 1892, Army Board recommended the Norwegian Krag–Jørgensen rifle to be adopted as the new service rifle. American designers were against the Army's adoption of a foreign design. In support of the designers' view, Congress demanded additional trials be conducted before any funds were to be authorized for the production of the Norwegian rifle. The additional trials were not only to include only domestically made rifles, but also a new board. The new board was appointed on March 1, 1893, and the trials commenced on April 7, 1893. The two rifles were again submitted, the board decided that Blake's design was unfit for military service due to the feed system. Despite the additional trials the Krag-Jørgensen rifle was still favoured over other designs. In 1895 Blake submitted his design to US Navy rifle trials, his rifle lost to Lee's design.

== Variants ==
Blake after failed attempts to convince both the Army and the Navy to adopt his design, decided to try selling his rifle on the civilian market. The Blake Rifle Book of 1899 lists rifles (28 in. barrel), carbines (20 in. barrel) and a sporting rifle (30 in. barrel). Rifles and carbines were offered in .236 Navy with rifling of one turn in 6.5 in., in .30-40 Krag and .303 with rifling of one turn in 9 in. to one turn in 12 in.. The sporting rifle was offered in .400 Blake cartridge, with rifling of one turn in 12 in. to one turn in 18 in. Additionally there were also four grades of hunting rifles:
grade A - priced from US$100 upward, compressed steel barrel, it was guaranteed to hit 4-in. circle at 200 yards with smokeless powder and 6-in. circle at 200 yards with black powder, imported walnut stock, engravings and checkered stock
grade B - priced US$80, nickel steel barrel, it was guaranteed to hit 5-in. circle at 200 yards with smokeless powder and an 8-in. circle at 200 yards with black powder, engravings and checkered stock
grade C - priced US$60, rest as grade B
grade D - priced US$50, rest as grade B but no engravings or checkered stock
