= Plains game =

Plains game is a term in sport hunting which generally refers to ruminant animals of sub-Saharan Africa which are smaller or similar in size to antelopes. In Namibia, these species include kudu, gemsbok, eland, mountain zebra, and springbok. In some cases, use of the term is much broader, encompassing all "herbivorous plains dwelling species." In this sense, plains game may also refer to wildebeests, giraffes, and impala.
