= 6 mm caliber =

Firearm cartridge classification

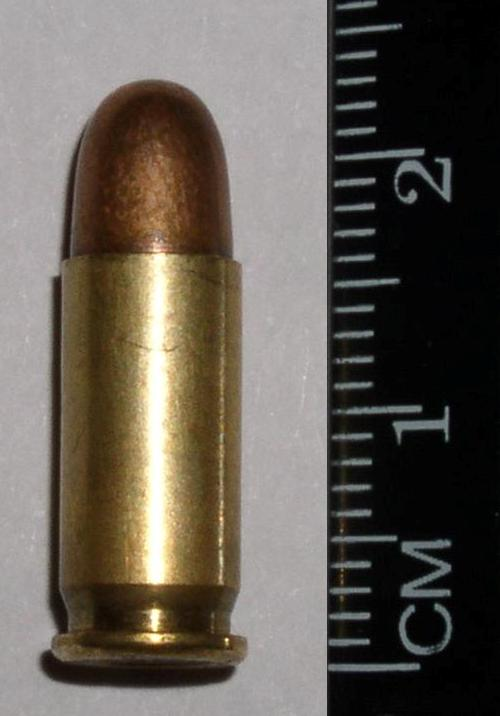
- Example of a 6 mm cartridge, a .25 ACP
- Firearm cartridges
- « 4 mm, 5 mm 6 mm 7 mm, 8 mm »

This is a list of firearm cartridges which have bullets of a caliber between 6 millimetres (0.236 in) and 6.99 millimetres (0.275 in).

- Length refers to the cartridge case length
- OAL refers to the overall length of the cartridge

Measurements are in millimeters then inches, i.e. mm (in).

== Pistol cartridges ==
| Name | Bullet | Case type | Case length | Rim | Base | Shoulder | Neck | OAL |
|---|---|---|---|---|---|---|---|---|
| .25 ACP (.25 Auto) | 6.375 (.251) | | 15.62 (.615) | 7.67 (.302) | 7.06 (.278) | - | 7.06 (.278) | 23.11 (.910) |
| .25 NAA | 6.375 (.251) | | 18.9 (.744) | 8.6 (.339) | 8.6 (.337) | 8.5 (.333) | 7.0 (.276) | 24.4 (.960) |
| 6.5mm Bergmann | 6.706 (.264) | | 22.1 (.87) | 9.4 (.372) | 9.3 (.368) | 8.4 (.330) | 7.2 (.285) | 31.2 (1.23) |
| 6.5×25mm CBJ | 4.0 (.157) | | | - | - | - | - | 29.7 (1.169) |

== Rifle cartridges ==
=== .24 in (6.2 mm) ===
| Name | Bullet | Case length | Rim | Base | Shoulder | Neck | OAL |
|---|---|---|---|---|---|---|---|
| .243 Winchester | 6.17 (.243) | 51.94 (2.035) | 12.00 (.472) | 11.96 (.470) | 11.5 (.454) | 7.01 (.276) | 68.82 (2.709) |
| 6mm BR | 6.17 (.243) | 39.6 (1.560) | 12.00 (.4728) | 11.96 (.4709) | 11.6 (.458) | 6.95 (.274) | 62.00 (2.441) |
| 6×45mm SAW | 6.17 (.243) | 45.01 (1.772) | 10.36 (.408) | 10.26 | 9.72 | 6.63 | 65.44 (2.576) |
| 6mm PPC | 6.172 (.243) | 38.48 (1.515) | 11.30 (.445) | 11.20 (.441) | 10.95 (.431) | 6.654 (.262) | 53.34 (2.100) |
| 6mm XC | 6.18 (.243) | 48.30 (1.902) | 11.95 (.470) | 11.92 (.469) | 11.53 (.454) | 6.96 (.274) | 70.00 (2.756) |
| .243 WSSM | 6.1722 (.243) | 42.42 (1.670) | 13.59 (.535) | 14.1 (.555) | 13.82 (.544) | 7.39 (.291) | 59.94 (2.360) |
| 6mm ARC | 6.18 (.243) | 37.85 (1.49) | 11.201 (.4410) | 11.2 (.441) | 10.924 (.4301) | 6.96 (.274) | 57.40 (2.260) |
| 6mm GT | 6.180 (.2433) | 43.82 (1.725) | 11.96 (.471) | 11.946 (.4703) | 11.660 (.5490) | 6.73 (.273) | 63.88 (2.515) to 67.06 (2.640) |
| 6mm Remington (.244 Remington) | 6.18 (.243) | 56.72 (2.233) | 11.99 (.472) | 11.96 (.471) | 10.89 (.429) | 7.01 (.276) | 71.76 (2.825) |
| .240 Weatherby Magnum | 6.18 (.243) | 63.40 (2.496) | 12.00 (.472) | 11.50 (.453) | 10.40(.429) | 6.90 (.272) | 80.00 (3.10) |
| 6mm Creedmoor | 6.182 (.2434) | 48.77 (1.920) | 11.99 (.472) | 11.946 (.4703) | 11.735 (.4620) | 7.01 (.276) | 71.12 (2.800) |
| 24 Nosler | 6.185 (.2435) | 40.64 (1.600) | 9.60 (.378) | 10.686 (.4207) | 10.249 (.4035) | 6.833 (.2690) | 57.40 (2.260) |
| 6mm AR | 6.2 (.243) | 38.7 (1.525) | 11.30 (.4449) | 11.26 (.4433) | 10.98 (.4323) | 6.9 (.271) | 57.4 (2.260) |
| 6×45mm | 6.2 (.243) | 45 (1.76) | 9.6 (.378) | 9.6 (.377) | 9 (.354) | 6.9 (.272) | 57.40 (2.260) |
| 6mm Lee Navy | 6.2 (.244) | 60 (2.35) | 11.4 (.448) | 11.5 (.443) | 10.2 (.402) | 7.1 (.278) | 79 (3.11) |
| .240 Apex.240 Magnum Rimless.240 Magnum Flanged; H&H 240 Apex.240 Belted Nitro Express | 6.223 (.245) | 63.25 (2.49) | 11.86 (.467) | 11.43 (.450) | 10.24 (.403) | 6.96 (.274) | 81.53 (3.21) |
| .244 H&H Magnum | 6.223 (.245) | 71 (2.78) | 13.5 (.532) | 12.9 (.508) | 11.3 (.445) | 6.7 (.263) | 91 (3.58) |

=== .25 in (6.5 mm) ===
| Name | Bullet | Case length | Rim | Base | Shoulder | Neck | OAL |
|---|---|---|---|---|---|---|---|
| .25-25 Stevens | 6.5 (.257) | 60.2 (2.37) | 9.6 (.376) | 8.2 (.323) | - | 7.2 (.282) | 66.8 (2.63) |
| .256 Win Magnum | 6.528 (.257) | 32.54 (1.281) | 11.18 (.440) | 9.677 (.381) | 9.347 (.368) | 6.528 (.257) | 40.39 (1.590) |
| .25-45 Sharps | 6.53 (.257) | 44.7 (1.76) | 9.6 (.378) | 9.6 (.376) | 8.99 (.3539) | 7.2 (.284) | 57.4 (2.26) |
| .257 Weatherby Magnum | 6.535 (.2573) | 64.74 (2.549) | 13.50 (.5315) | 12.997 (.5117) | 12.49 (.492) | 7.24 (.285) | 81.51 (3.209) |
| .25 Remington | 6.54 (.257) | 52.1 (2.05) | 10.6 (.419) | 10.6 (.419) | 10.1 (.396) | 7.3 (.286) | 64.3 (2.53) |
| 255 GS | 6.54 (.257) | 55.00 (2.165) | 12.20 (.480) | 12.20 (.480) | 11.58 (.456) | 7.38 (.291) tapering to 7.33 (.289) | 72.50 (2.854) |
| .25-06 Remington | 6.541 (.2575) | 63.35 (2.494) | 12.01 (.473) | 11.94 (.470) | 11.20 (.441) | 7.37 (.290) | 82.55 (3.250) |
| .25 WSSM | 6.541 (.2575) | 42.42 (1.670) | 13.59 (.535) | 14.097 (.5550) | 13.826 (.5443) | 7.595 (.2990) | 59.94 (2.360) |
| .25-20 Winchester | 6.55 (.258) | 33.78 (1.33) | 10.36 (.408) | 8.86 (.349) | 8.46 (.333) | 6.96 (.274) | 40.44 (1.592) |
| .25-35 Winchester | 6.55 (.258) | 51.89 (2.043) | 12.85 (.506) | 10.73 (.422) | 9.26 (.365) | 7.15 (.282) | 64.77 (2.55) |
| .250-3000 Savage | 6.553 (.258) | 48.46 (1.912) | 12.01 (.473) | 11.91 (.469) | 10.51 (.414) | 7.26 (.286) | 63.88 (2.515) |
| .257 Roberts | 6.553 (.258) | 56.72 (2.233) | 12.01 (.473) | 11.99 (.472) | 10.92 (.430) | 7.36 (.290) | 70.49 (2.775) |

=== .26 in (6.6 mm) and up ===
| Name | Bullet | Case length | Rim | Base | Shoulder | Neck | OAL |
|---|---|---|---|---|---|---|---|
| 6.45×48mm XPL Swiss | 6.65 (.262) | 47.72 (1.879) | 11.81 (.465) | 11.82 (.465) | 10.95 (.431) | 7.56 (.298) | 65.06 (2.561) |
| 6.5×58mm Vergueiro | 6.65 (.262) | 57.85 (2.278) | 11.78 (.464) | 11.88 (.468) | 10.94 (.431) | 7.56 (.298) | 81.50 (3.209) |
| 6.5×55mm Swedish (aka 6.5×55mm Krag) | 6.7 (.264) | 54.864 (2.16) | 12.192 (.480) | 12.17 (.479) | 10.688 (.420) | 7.468 (.294) | 80.010 (3.15) |
| 6.5×57mm Mauser | 6.70 (.264) | 56.70 (2.232) | 11.95 (.470) | 11.90 (.469) | 10.94 (.431) | 7.65 (.301) | 82.0 (3.228) |
| 6.5×68mm | 6.70 (.264) | 67.50 (2.657) | 13.00 (.512) | 13.30 (.524) | 12.18 (.480) | 7.60 (.299) | 86.50 (3.408) |
| 6.5-284 Norma | 6.70 (.264) | 55.118 (2.170) | 12.014 (.473) | 12.725 (.501) | 12.065 (.475) | 7.544 (.297) | 81.991 (3.228) |
| 6.5mm Remington Magnum | 6.70 (.264) | 55.1 (2.170) | 13.51 (.532) | 13.51 (.532) | 12.6 (.495) | 7.6 (.298) | 71.1 (2.80) |
| 6.5-06 A-Square | 6.70 (.264) | 63.3 (2.494) | 12.014 (.473) | 11.93 (.470) | 11.24 (.443) | 7.5 (.296) | 87.3 (3.44) |
| .256 Newton | 6.70 (.264) | 61.976 (2.440) | 12.014 (473) | 11.963 (.471) | 10.617 (.418) | 7.391 (.291) | 86.36 (3.40) |
| .260 Remington | 6.70 (.264) | 51.7 (2.035) | 12.0 (.473) | 11.9 (.470) | 11.5 (.454) | 7.5 (.297) | 71 (2.8) |
| 6.5mm Creedmoor | 6.70 (.264) | 48.8 (1.924) | 12.01 (.473) | 11.9 (.470) | 11.7 (.459) | 7.54 (.297) | 71.6 (2.82) |
| 6.5×47mm Lapua | 6.70 (.264) | 47 (1.9) | 12.01 (.473) | 11.95 (.470) | 11.53 (.454) | 7.41 (.292) | 70 (2.8) |
| 6.5mm Grendel | 6.70 (.264) | 38.7 (1.524) | 11.2 (.441) | 11.14 (.439) | 10.87 (.428) | 7.44 (.293) | 57.5 (2.264) |
| .264 Winchester Magnum | 6.70 (.264) | 64 (2.5) | 13.5 (.532) | 13.1 (.515) | 12.5 (.491) | 7.6 (.299) | 85 (3.34) |
| 6.5×50mmSR Arisaka | 6.705 (.264) | 50.39 (1.984) | 11.84 (.466) | 11.35 (.447) | 10.59 (.417) | 7.34 (.289) | 75.69 (2.980) |
| 6.5×54mm Mannlicher–Schönauer | 6.705 (.264) | 53.65 (2.112) | 11.52 (.454) | 11.47 (.452) | 10.87 (.428) | 7.56 (.288) | 76.77 (3.022) |
| 6,5 G.A.P. 4S | 6.71 (.264) | 51.18 (2.015) | 13.56 (.534) | 14.00 (.551) | 13.58 (.535) | 7.42 (.292) | 76.30 (3.004) |
| 6.5 Weatherby Rebated Precision Magnum | 6.71 (.2640) | 65.3 (2.570) | 12.0 (.473) | 12.70 (.5000) | 12.04 (.4739) | 7.49 (.2950) | 84.8 (3.340) |
| 6.5 PRC | 6.716 (.2644) | 51.56 (2.030) | 13.51 (.532) | 13.513 (.5320) | 13.101 (.5158) | 7.54 (.297) | 75.06 (2.955) |
| 6.5-300 Weatherby Magnum | 6.716 (.2644) | 71.76 (2.825) | 13.50 (.5315) | 12.997 (.5117) | 12.498 (.4920) | 7.493 (.2950) | 91.44 (3.600) |
| 26 Nosler | 6.718 (.2645) | 65.79 (2.590) | 13.56 (.534) | 13.970 (.5500) | 13.399 (.5275) | 7.544 (.2970) | 84.84 (3.340) |
| 6.5×53mmR | 6.756 (.266) | 53.59 (2.110) | 13.40 (.527) | 11.48 (.453) | 10.75 (.423) | 7.55 (.297) | 77.56 (3.053) |
| 6.5×52mm Carcano | 6.80 (.268) | 52.50 (2.067) | 11.42 (.450) | 11.42 (.450) | 10.85 (.427) | 7.52 (.296) | 76.50 (3.012) |

== See also ==
- .25 caliber
