= Shooting Times =

British shooting and fieldsports magazine

Shooting Times & Country Magazine
- Cover of the 12 August 2026 issue
- Editor: Martin Puddifer
- Categories: Shooting and fieldsports
- Frequency: Weekly
- Publisher: Time Well Spent Group
- First issue: 1882
- Country: United Kingdom
- Language: English
- Website: www.shootinguk.co.uk

Shooting Times & Country Magazine, commonly known as Shooting Times, is a British weekly hunting magazine. It is published by the Time Well Spent Group.

== History ==
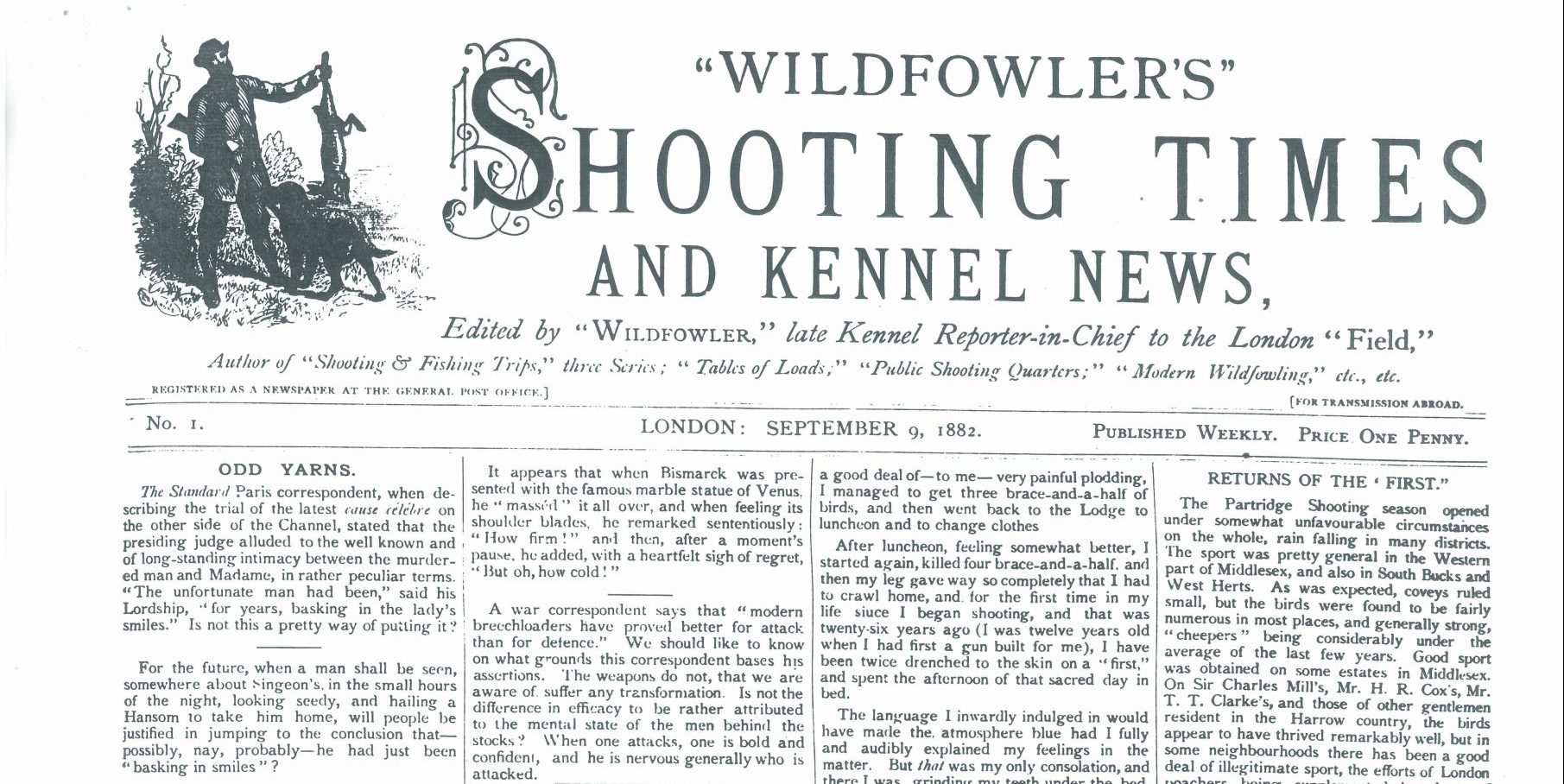
Wildfowler’s Shooting Times and Kennel News, September 1882

Shooting Times was founded in 1882 as Wildfowler’s Shooting Times and Kennel News by Lewis Clement, a sporting journalist who wrote under the pen name “Wildfowler.” The magazine appeared during a period of growth in the British sporting press, as specialist publications began to emerge alongside established newspapers and general‑interest magazines.

In 1893, Clement left the magazine and A. C. Bonsall became editor. Bonsall changed the title to Shooting Times, British Sportsman and Kennel News. The magazine later adopted the modern title Shooting Times & Country Magazine.

Tim Sedgwick served as editor from 1932 to 1965 and was succeeded by Philip Brown. Later editors included Derek Bingham, Jonathan Young, John Gregson, Mark Hedges, Julian Murray‑Evans, Rob Gray and Ollie Harvey. The current managing editor is Martin Puddifer.

Currently the magazine publishes articles on game shooting, deer stalking, gundog training, conservation, and rural land management, along with news and opinion related to shooting and field sports.

== Recent ownership ==
In April 2023, Future plc sold Shooting Times to Fieldsports Press. In February 2024, Fieldsports Press acquired The Countryman's Weekly and merged it into Shooting Times, increasing the magazine’s pagination. Fieldsports Press changed its name to the Time Well Spent Group in September 2024.

== Circulation ==
The Audit Bureau of Circulations (ABC) reported a combined print and digital circulation of 21,303 in 2013, with the magazine remaining registered with ABC until 2019. Since 2026, 150,000 members of the British Association for Shooting and Conservation have received complimentary digital access.

== See also ==
- Field sports
- British Association for Shooting and Conservation
- Clay Pigeon Shooting Association

== Citations ==
- Consumer Magazines Report: December 2012 (Report). Audit Bureau of Circulations. December 2012.
- "Shooting Times & Country Magazine". Audit Bureau of Circulations.
- "BASC partners with Shooting Times to offer members free digital access". British Association for Shooting and Conservation. 29 April 2026.
- "TIME WELL SPENT GROUP LIMITED: Filing history". Companies House.
- Galbraith, Patrick (30 July 2018). "Shooting Times takes aim at greed of estates". The Times.
- Hadoke, Diggory (4 September 2022). "The Life of a Magazine". Vintage Guns.
- "Fieldsports Press rebrands to Time Well Spent". InPublishing. 3 October 2024.
- Maher, Bron (15 February 2024). "Countryman's Weekly merged with Shooting Times, preventing outright closure". Press Gazette.
- Ponsford, Dominic (20 February 2023). "UK magazine ABCs: Winners, losers and full breakdown as circulation declines average 6 per cent". Press Gazette.
- Tobitt, Charlotte (13 April 2023). "Fieldsports Press acquires Future's shooting brands". Press Gazette.
- Ollie Harvey (4 March 2026). "Victory for clarity". Shooting Times. No. 6, 595.
- Jackson, Tony (13 September 2007). "The history of Shooting Times magazine". ShootingUK.
- Levy, Katherine (25 February 2011). "Media: It's now survival of the fittest". Campaign.
