= Pipewell Hall =

Building in Wilbarston, Northamptonshire, England

Coordinates: 52°27′40″N 0°46′06″W

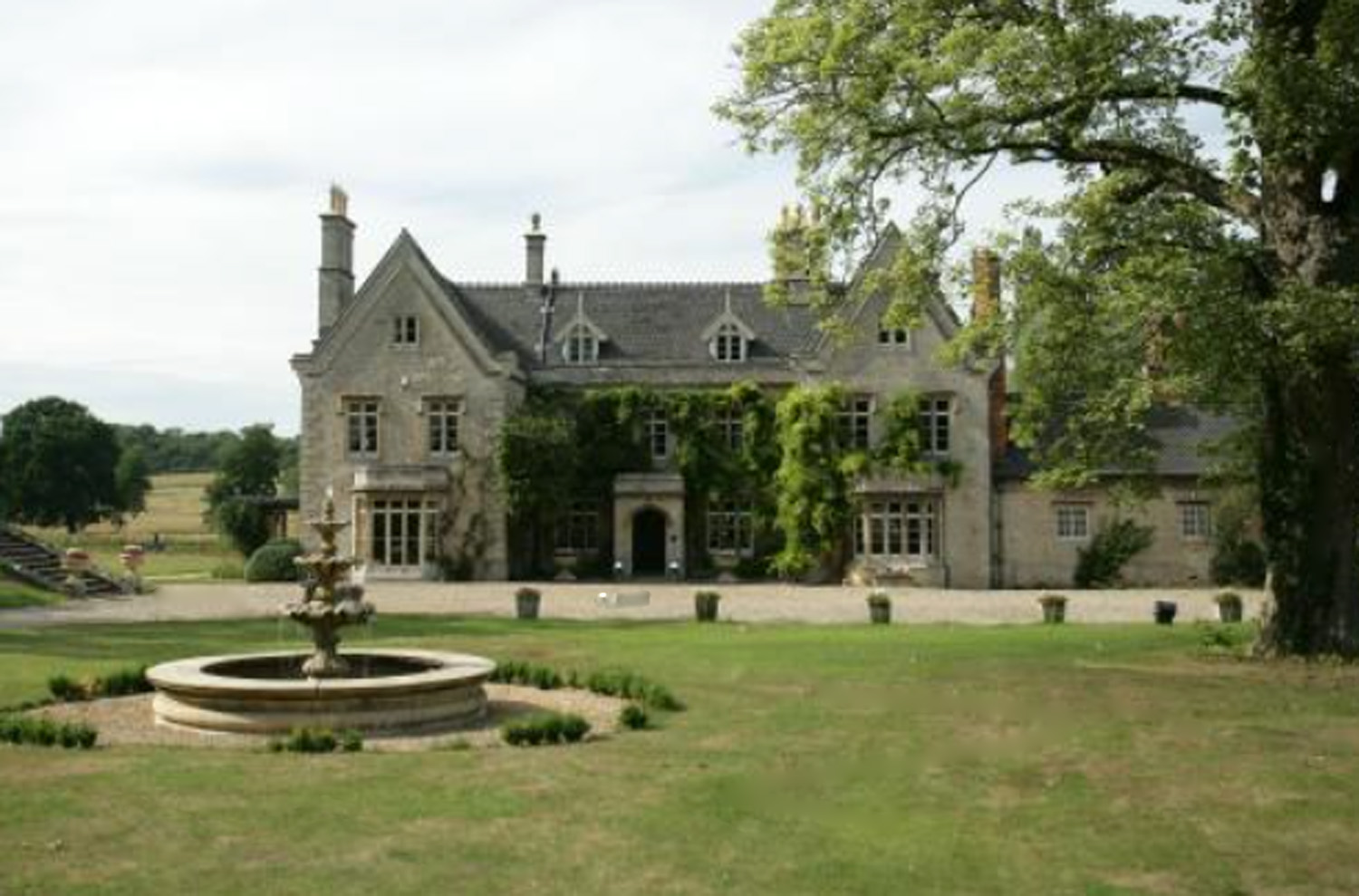
Pipewell Hall

Pipewell Hall in Northamptonshire, England, is a building of historical significance and is Grade II listed on the English Heritage Register. It was built near the ruins of a Cistercian abbey in 1675. At this time it was owned by the Barons of Powis. The house was constructed from the stones of the abbey. The Hall was the home of many notable people over the next three centuries and is now a wedding venue.

== The Barons of Powis ==
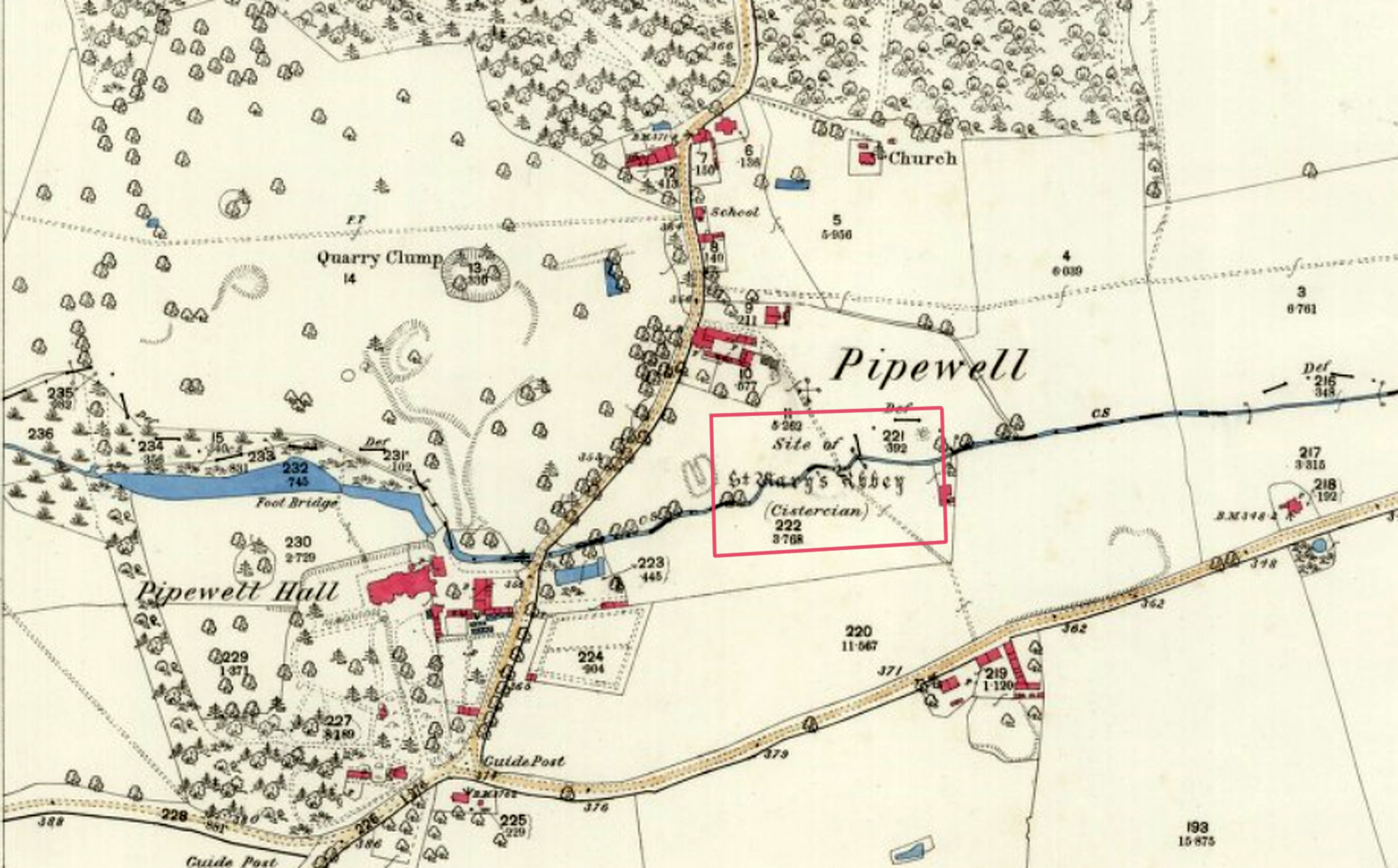
Historical map of Pipewell Hall showing the location of the ruined Cistercian abbey

Pipewell Abbey which was owned by the Cistercian monks was closed in 1538 at the time of the dissolution of the monasteries and given to Sir William Parre. By 1620 it was in the possession of Thomas Cecil, Earl of Exeter. There is a deed dated 1622 which conveys "all the manor and lordship of Pipewell and the site of the late monastery of Pipewell with the appurtenances in the said County of Northampton" from the Cecil family to the Craven family. When Elizabeth Craven married Percy Herbert, 2nd Baron Powis in the same year the lands came into the Powis family although Elizabeth retained some ownership of them. Sir Percy temporarily lost some of his land in 1652 because of his religious beliefs but he regained it several years later. When he died in 1667 his property was inherited by his eldest son William Herbert, 1st Marquess of Powis. It was he who owned the Pipewell Estate when Pipewell Hall was built in 1675.

It remained with the Powis dynasty until the early 1700s when it was bought by Charles Sambourne Le Bas. The historian John Bridges wrote "a Mr La Bas by purchase from the Duke of Powis was Lord of Pipewell".

== The Le Bas and Harcourt families ==
Charles Sambourne Le Bas (1665-1724) was the son of a Huguenot refugee from Caen, Normandy. He was a prosperous merchant of Cecil Court in London. He bought Pipewell Abbey Estate as his country residence. In 1711 he married Mary Moyer who was the daughter and co heiress of Sir Samuel Moyer of Petsey Hall, Essex, an eminent merchant who died in 1716. The couple had one child Rebecca Le Bas (1714-1765).

When he died in 1724 the Pipewell Estate was left to Rebecca who in 1735 married Simon Harcourt, 1st Earl Harcourt (1714-1777). She brought it into the ownership of the Harcourt family. After her husband Simon died in 1777 it was left to their eldest son George Harcourt, 2nd Earl Harcourt. He was the proprietor for most of his life but in 1806 he decided to sell the property. The Historian Gardiner said that because the Earl was obliged to pay a large sum of money to his relatives he sold Pipewell Abbey. It was bought by John Hambrough (1754-1831) who also owned a house in Hanwell.

== The Hambrough family ==
John Hambrough (1754-1831) was a wealthy landowner. In 1788 he married Catherine Holden daughter of Robert Holden of Lancaster. The couple had a daughter and a son. When he died in 1831 his only son John Hambrough (1793-1861) inherited Pipewell Hall. He was born in 1793 and at the age of 16 he inherited from Edmund Hill the Stanwell Estate in Middlesex. In 1820 he married Sophia Townsend, daughter of Gore Townsend of Honington Hall, Warwickshire. Her mother was Lady Elizabeth Windsor, daughter of Sir Other Lewis Windsor, 4th Earl of Plymouth. In 1828 John bought the Steephill Estate on the Isle of Wight and some years later built Steephill Castle (now demolished). When he died in 1861 his surviving son Oscar William Holden Hambrough (1825-1900) inherited the Hall.

Oscar William Holden Hambrough was born in 1825 on the Isle of Wight. He married in 1859 Caroline Mary Hood, daughter of Sir Samuel Hood 3rd Viscount Hood. The couple had no children so when he died in 1900 it was inherited by a relative, Major Dudley Albert Hambrough (1849-1908). He died in 1908 and his son Albert Fitzroy Hambrough (1890-1921) became the owner. Upon his death in 1921 it was sold to Samuel Janson Lloyd.

Major Hambrough's son Cecil was the victim in the Ardlamont murder of 1893.

== The Lloyd family ==
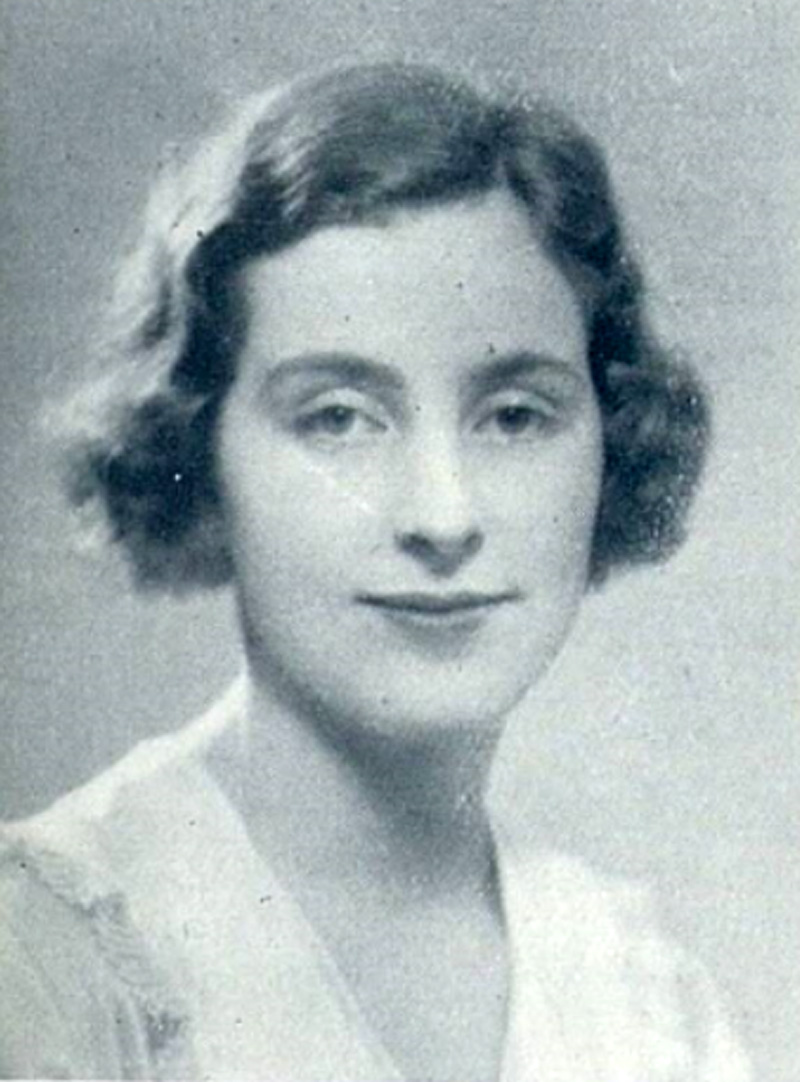
Evadne (called Bobby) Lloyd in 1932 shortly before her marriage.

Samuel Janson Lloyd (1870-1943) was the managing director of the ironstone company Stewarts & Lloyds which was founded by his father. In 1896 he married Margaret Ellen Phillips. The couple had thirteen children. Their youngest son was killed in World War Two in 1944 and a book was recently published containing the letters he sent to his mother in the War. The book also contains a photo of him aged two at Pipewell Hall.

Samuel died in 1943 and the house was inherited by his son David Llewellen Lloyd (1910-1996) who is famous for his development of a stalking rifle. In 1945 he married Evadne (called Bobby) Flower who was the daughter of Sir Archibald Dennis Flower, governor of the Royal Shakespeare Theatre. Evadne also became a governor and served in this role for seventy years. After their marriage the couple remained at Pipewell Hall for the next sixty years. Their lifestyle was described in a 2003 newspaper article in the following terms.

"After the war, the Lloyds settled at Pipewell Hall in Northamptonshire. Here Bobby participated fully in Lloyd's passion for rifle making and his long quest to create the perfect stalking rifle and a telescopic sight-mount which would stand up to rigorous use. Together they toured Europe to procure adequate supplies of walnut for the stocks. Life assumed a pattern: stalking in the autumn at Glencassley, the Highland estate which Charles Flower had bought in the 1870s, skiing at Gstaad in the winter (Bobby was still on skis at the age of 85), and motoring to Monte Carlo for the Grand Prix."

David died in 1996 and Evadne in 2003 at the age of 91. In 2004 the Hall was sold.
