= .244 H&H Magnum =

Cartridge for firearms

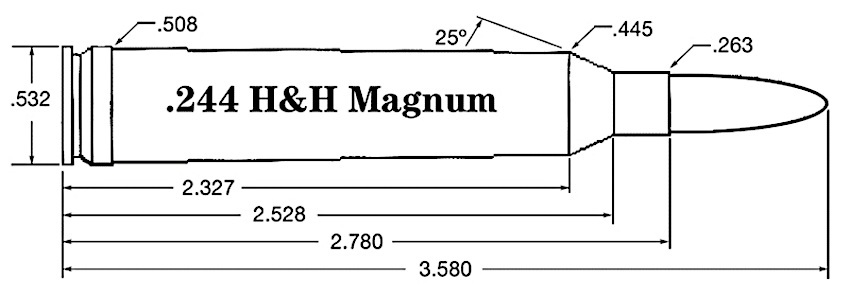
- Type: Rifle
- Place of origin: United Kingdom

Production history
- Designer: David Lloyd
- Designed: 1955
- Manufacturer: Holland & Holland
- Produced: 1955–present

Specifications
- Parent case: .375 H&H Magnum
- Case type: Belted, bottleneck
- Bullet diameter: .245 in (6.2 mm)
- Land diameter: .237 in (6.0 mm)
- Neck diameter: .263 in (6.7 mm)
- Shoulder diameter: .445 in (11.3 mm)
- Base diameter: .508 in (12.9 mm)
- Rim diameter: .532 in (13.5 mm)
- Case length: 2.78 in (71 mm)
- Overall length: 3.58 in (91 mm)

Ballistic performance
Bullet mass/type	Velocity	Energy
100 gr (6 g) SP	3,500 ft/s (1,100 m/s)	2,720 ft⋅lbf (3,690 J)
- Source(s): Cartridges of the World

The .244 Holland & Holland Magnum cartridge was created in 1955 in Great Britain by deerstalker and rifle-maker David Lloyd of Pipewell Hall, Northamptonshire and Glencassley in Sutherland, Scotland, and is not to be confused with the smaller-cased and much milder 6 mm (.244 in) Remington. Stalking on extremely steep deer forests such as his own at Glencassley, Lloyd was in search of a "canyon rifle" cartridge that would shoot exceptionally fast and with a very flat trajectory across deep valleys and over distances out to 300 yards (270 m) and more, to make range estimation less critical for accurate bullet placement, and to deliver a hard-hitting bullet weighing a minimum of 100 grains. The .244 H&H Magnum easily met these criteria.

== History ==
Based upon the well-proven .375 H&H Magnum rimless belted big-game cartridge case heavily necked down, the .244 H&H originally fired a 100-grain (6.5 g), aluminum-jacketed, copper-pointed bullet pushed by 74 grains (4.8 g) of non-cordite smokeless (nitrocellulose) powder, and returned a muzzle velocity of about 3,500 feet per second (1,100 m/s). That load and velocity remain standard for the commercially loaded cartridge today; although handloaders can achieve higher velocities with careful load tuning. The .244 seldom performs well in barrels less than 26 inches (660 mm) long, owing to the need for a longer bore to allow pressure and bullet velocity to reach intended levels.

Lloyd was unable and unwilling to embark upon commercial cartridge production, and consequently "gave" the cartridge to veteran London rifle and ammunition makers Holland & Holland Ltd., who in 1954 had paid him £250 towards his cartridge development costs. H&H quickly adopted it, the cartridge acquired the prestigious "H&H" appellation, and both H&H and David Lloyd went on to build significant numbers of very high quality bolt-action deer-stalking rifles in .244 H&H Magnum calibre (see Lloyd rifle). Initially, commercially loaded ammunition was manufactured by IMI Kynoch at its Birmingham, England factory. Commercially, this cartridge has only ever been loaded with 100-grain (6.5 g) bullets: lighter- and heavier-bulleted loads have been created by handloaders.

Chuck Hawks, a prominent US commentator on rifle cartridges, opines that, "the .244 H&H Magnum represents some sort of high water mark in the development of the 6 mm cartridge. To use an aviation analogy, you could think of it as the Concorde of rifle cartridges."

David Lloyd, the .244's originator, went on to develop a still more powerful prototype round by reducing the case body taper and increasing the already large power capacity to produce the "David Lloyd 6 mm Magnum". His hope was to use bullets heavier than the .244 H&H standard 100-grain (6.5 g); but this cartridge was never commercially produced, and only two prototype Lloyd rifles are believed to have been chambered for it.

In the early 1990s British fieldsports author and ballistician Colin McKelvie had a custom rifle built on a BRNO CZ Magnum action, with a .244in Border Barrel with a 1:7 fast twist. Using handloads with very-low-drag (VLD) .244in hollow-point bullets of 115 grains (7.5 g), accuracy of 0.63 MOA was achieved, with average muzzle velocity of 3,630 ft/s (1,106 m/s) and acceptable chamber pressures. This level of performance is what Lloyd had sought with his "improved" .244 H&H Magnum.

== Controversy ==
While the belted .244 H&H Magnum could be considered the velocity/energy pinnacle of 6 mm/.240in cartridges, that power comes at the cost of significant muzzle blast, as well as shorter-than-average barrel life; in addition to which commercially loaded ammunition is expensive. Because of these drawbacks the cartridge never came into widespread popularity, and has never been offered as a chambering by any of the mass-market riflemakers. The .244 H&H rather fell by the wayside in favour of 6 mm rifles in the same general class such as the .240 Weatherby Magnum (for which it had been an inspiration to designer Roy Weatherby), and also the various 6.5 mm Magnums. The .244 H&H still has its adherents, however, and occasional rifles are still chambered in this caliber by Holland & Holland and others. Ammunition is still made for Holland & Holland and used cases can be handloaded.

== See also ==
- List of cartridges by caliber
- List of rifle cartridges
- 6 mm caliber
