= 6mm Lee Navy =

US Navy and Marines rifle cartridge

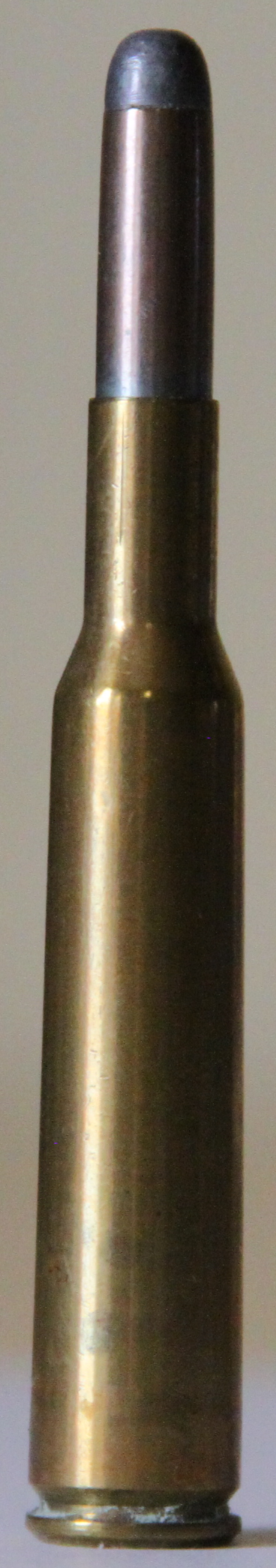
- A soft-point hunting cartridge
- Type: Rifle
- Place of origin: United States

Service history
- In service: 1895–1907

Production history
- Designed: 1894
- Produced: 1895–1935

Specifications
- Case type: Semi-rimmed, bottleneck
- Bullet diameter: .244 in (6.2 mm)
- Neck diameter: .278 in (7.1 mm)
- Shoulder diameter: .402 in (10.2 mm)
- Base diameter: .445 in (11.3 mm)
- Rim diameter: .448 in (11.4 mm)
- Case length: 2.35 in (60 mm)
- Overall length: 3.11 in (79 mm)
- Rifling twist: 1 in 7.5 in (190 mm)
- Primer type: Boxer large rifle

Ballistic performance
Bullet mass/type	Velocity	Energy
75 gr (5 g)	3,300 ft/s (1,000 m/s)	1,809 ft⋅lbf (2,453 J)
100 gr (6 g)	2,680 ft/s (820 m/s)	1,595 ft⋅lbf (2,163 J)
112 gr (7 g)	2,650 ft/s (810 m/s)	1,895 ft⋅lbf (2,569 J)
112 gr (7.3 g) (military loading)	2,560 ft/s (780 m/s)	1,629 ft⋅lbf (2,209 J)
- Test barrel length: 24 in.; 28 in. (M1895); Sources: Barnes & Amber; Sharpe, Philip, The Rifle in America

The 6mm Lee Navy (6×60mmSR), also known as the 6mm U.S.N. or .236 Navy, is an obsolete American rifle cartridge. It was the service cartridge of the United States Navy and Marine Corps from 1895, replacing the .45-70 Government cartridge, and until 1899 when it was succeeded by the .30-40 Krag.

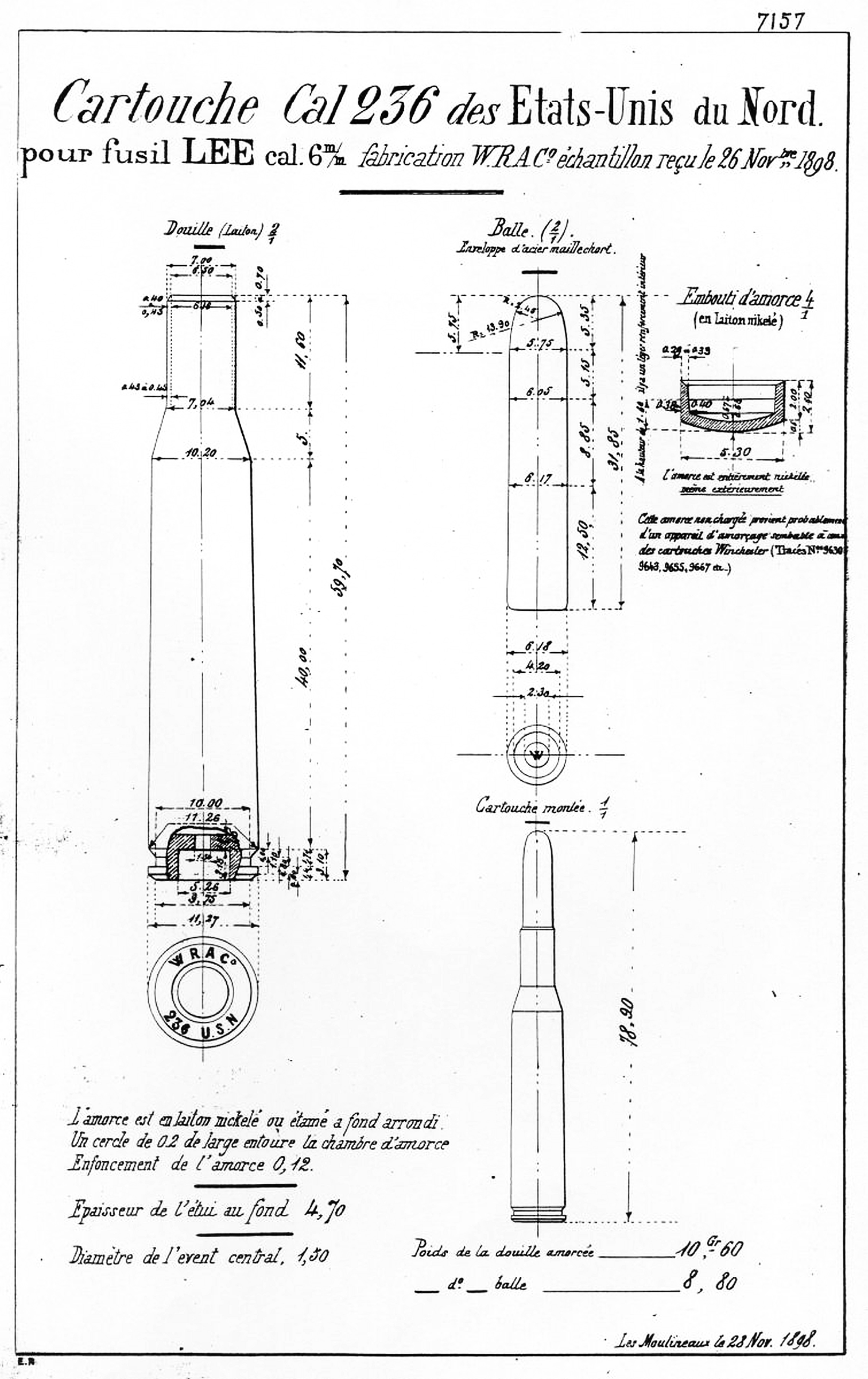
6mm Lee Navy cartridge dimensions

== History and development ==
By 1894, the U.S. Navy desired to adopt a modern small-bore, smokeless powder service cartridge and rifle in keeping with other first-line naval powers for both naval and marine forces. Naval authorities decided that the new cartridge should be adaptable to both rifles and machine guns. Noting that the world's military forces were adopting smaller and smaller caliber rifles with higher velocity cartridges, U.S. naval authorities decided to leapfrog the trend by adopting a cartridge in 6 mm (0.236 inch) caliber, with a semi-rimmed case capable of holding up to 40 grains (0.091 oz; 2.6 g) of 'Rifleite' smokeless powder and proof chamber pressures of up to 60,000 psi (4,100 atm). While the government cartridge was being developed, the Navy tested rifle barrels in various alloys and rifling twists, eventually settling on a barrel steel made of 4.5 percent nickel steel, with a rifling twist of one turn in 6.5 inches (16.5 cm).

As the Chief of the Bureau of Naval Ordnance stated in his 1897 Small Arms report to the Secretary of the Navy, "In making what may appear a radical departure in its selection of a caliber smaller than as yet adopted elsewhere [...] the Bureau is convinced it is looking to the future [...] it is surely wise to attempt to advance with one stride as far as existing conditions allow toward the goal to which the world is moving with slow steps." The report went on to list the advantages of the smaller 6 mm caliber: greatly increased velocity, the flatness of bullet trajectory, reduced recoil, a 100% increase in penetration compared to the former .45-70 Government cartridge, and the ability to carry twice the number of cartridges per individual sailor or Marine. The report also acknowledged two disadvantages of the 6 mm round: its small caliber would not sufficiently wound an enemy to put them out of action; the "shock" or stopping power of the smaller bullet would not "stop the onset of excited men at short range". In answer to these objections, the report gave three responses: first, "the battle of the future will be fought at long range, and men will not live to come to close quarters with an enemy who stands his ground"; second, "99 percent of wounded enemy soldiers were unlikely to investigate the severity of their wound, but simply retire to the rear", and last, "the explosive effect of a small-caliber, high-velocity bullet against the human body—the bullet tumbles or fragments to produce devastating wounds against bone or fluid-filled organs—would be more incapacitating at all ranges than wounds made by a slow-moving bullet of large caliber".

On August 1, 1894, a naval test board was convened at the Naval Torpedo Station in Newport, Rhode Island, to test submitted magazine rifles in the new 6mm Navy caliber developed by naval ordnance authorities. The government notice of bid requirements said no other calibers or cartridges would be considered. Winchester made the ammunition for the government, which in turn provided each competitor with 6 mm USN cartridges and 0.236-inch caliber rifle barrels, the latter supplied unchambered and with receiver threads uncut. The rifle action was required to withstand the firing of five overpressure (proof) cartridges with a chamber pressure of 60,000 psi. Several inventors and rifle manufacturers submitted models for testing, among them James Paris Lee, who offered two designs, a turnbolt and a cam-action or locking bolt type, the Lee straight-pull. The Lee straight-pull won in repeated trials and the U.S. Navy adopted the round in 1895 as the Lee Rifle, Model of 1895, caliber 6mm.

As adopted by the Navy after tests at the Naval Torpedo Station, the ball cartridge, 6mm or 6 mm USN cartridge, featured a long, bottle-necked semi-rimmed brass case and a 135-grain (0.31 oz; 8.7 g) round-nosed, cupro-nickel coated, steel-jacketed, lead core bullet. The initial version utilized a 135-grain steel-jacketed lead core bullet with a 2.35-inch-long case and 0.517-inch rim, with a bullet diameter of 0.244 inches (the bore diameter before rifling was 0.236 inches). The rifle powder for the new cartridge was Rifleite, a flake nitrocellulose smokeless powder originally developed for use in the British .303 cartridge.

The new 6 mm cartridge achieved a muzzle velocity of 2,550 fps (777 m/s) and was initially manufactured by Winchester (WRA) for the Navy. Because of production delays and the desire to have a secondary ammunition source in the event of war or another emergency, the Union Metallic Cartridge (UMC) Company was also awarded a contract to produce 6 mm ammunition. After the adoption of the M1895 Lee, the case rim of the government cartridge was redesigned with a slight bevel (rebated rim) for optimum performance in the en bloc charger-loaded magazine of the M1895 rifle. The revised cartridge was designated the 6 mm U.S.N., but continued to be referred to in naval stores reports as the ball cartridge, 6 mm. Owing to difficulties in obtaining acceptable lots of Rifleite smokeless powder for the cartridge, as well as cartridge clips, Winchester and UMC did not fill the initial April 1896 Navy order of 1,000,000 cartridges for more than a year.

In March 1897, after reports of excessive chamber pressures and short barrel life (3,000 rounds) despite the use of 4.5 percent nickel-steel barrels, the specifications for the 6 mm round were changed to incorporate a 112-grain (0.26 oz; 7.3 g) round-nosed lead core bullet with a copper jacket, which was then tin-plated to prevent corrosion from salt air. Winchester and UMC had difficulty in achieving the pressure limit specification (43,000 psi) for the new loading with Rifleite, and chamber pressures varied widely from lot to lot of powder, ranging up to 60,000 psi. The new M1895 Colt–Browning machine gun was also modified to accept the new 112-grain (0.26 oz; 7.3 g) loading the same year, and a further 500,000 cartridges were ordered to accommodate machine-gun usage.

Firing a 112-grain (0.26 oz; 7.3 g) bullet at 2,560 ft/s (780 m/s) from a 28 in (710 mm) barrel, the 6 mm U.S.N. was the highest-velocity cartridge used by any military force at the time of its adoption. Designed to achieve better penetration than the Army's .30 Army cartridge used in the Model 1892/98 (Krag) rifle, the round was intended to perforate the hulls of small enemy craft such as patrol and torpedo boats, and could penetrate 13 in (330 mm) of softwood at 700 yd (640 m), 0.5 in (13 mm) of low-carbon steel at 10 feet (3 m); 0.375-inch (9.5 mm) of ordinary boiler plate at 100 ft (30 m), or a .276 in (7.0 mm)-thick suspended chrome steel alloy boiler plate at 150 ft (46 m). The 112-grain (0.26 oz; 7.3 g) round-nosed bullet had a flatter trajectory than its 135-grain (0.31 oz; 8.7 g) predecessor at all ranges up to 500 yards; above this distance, the heavier bullet began to show an advantage. The new loading had an effective range (individual rifle fire) of 600-700 yards, at which point the blunt-tipped bullet rapidly lost velocity and energy. The 112-grain (0.26 oz; 7.3 g) bullet, like its predecessor, demonstrated an inclination to instability unless rapidly rotated. The M1895 Lee rifle therefore received a rapid barrel rifling twist of one turn in 7.5 inches (19 cm) (with right-hand twist) to keep the bullet from wobbling or tumbling at extended ranges. At some point, this rifling was changed in later production rifles to one turn in 10 inches RH (25 cm). Contemporary medical reports of the day noted the 112-grain (0.26 oz; 7.3 g) bullet produced noticeably greater damage to tissue and bone than other contemporary military cartridges when fired at full velocity (2,560 fps), and the bullet's copper jacket frequently fragmented or detached entirely from its lead core after penetrating a hard substance such as bone or metal. However, when the 6 mm bullet struck muscle or air-filled cavities such as the lungs, the bullet tended to make a perforating wound of small diameter that caused little damage.

The 6 mm Lee Navy cartridge proved expensive to produce, with a per round cost approximately double that of the previous .45-70 service cartridge. Delays caused by difficulties in getting smokeless powder of the proper specification postponed shipments of ammunition under the Navy's contract with Winchester (WRA) and UMC, and shipments of the 6 mm Lee rifle were also delayed due to manufacturing issues and contract changes. As a result, the .45-70 Government cartridge and small arms chambered for it continued in front-line service with the Navy until 1897, when the latter cartridge was made substitute standard for second-line vessels. Because of arguments over inadequate congressional appropriations, Marine battalions scheduled to be equipped with the Lee had not received either rifles or ammunition until 1897, two years after the adoption of the cartridge and rifle. Colonel-Commandant Charles Heywood of the Marine Corps reportedly refused initial deliveries of small numbers of Lee rifles to Marine battalions until he received assurances that an appropriation would be made to the Corps for at least 3,000 Lee rifles, improved target ranges, and enough ammunition to continue existing marksmanship training programs. Despite this threat, the report of the Marine Corps quartermaster as of September 1897 begged the secretary for an additional $10,000 appropriation for 6 mm ammunition to allow the Marines to conduct live fire and target practice with the Lee rifle. The report went on to warn that, except for drill practice, enlisted Marines were "entirely unfamiliar with the use of this arm", since all target practice had to be conducted using the old single-shot Springfield and .45-70 ammunition.

Issued to both naval armed guards (bluejackets) and Marine battalions, the 6 mm Lee Navy cartridge saw combat service with U.S. forces (primarily Marine riflemen and Colt machine gun detachments) in both Cuba and the Philippines during the Spanish–American War.

The round was also issued to small formations of attached Cuban rebels participating in the Guantánamo Bay campaign. The lighter weight of the 6 mm Lee cartridge meant individual riflemen could carry more cartridges, since one-hundred and sixty .30 Army cartridges weighed as much as 220 rounds of 6 mm. The extra cartridges proved useful when early ammunition resupply from Navy ships was disrupted at the outset of the Guantanamo operation, allowing Marines to continue their assault even while individually resupplying Cuban rebels who had run short of ammunition.

Later, during the early stages of the Moro Rebellion (1899–1913) in the Philippines, the 6 mm cartridge was criticized by some Marines for failing to stop the frenzied charges of bolo-wielding Moro juramentados at very close ranges. The possibility that a 6 mm bullet might lack stopping power had been raised as far back as 1895 when the cartridge was in the process of being developed for adoption. However, the Marine Legation Guard, which used the 6mm Lee in the defense of the foreign legations in Peking during the Boxer Rebellion (1899–1901), together with Marines and Navy bluejackets serving in the expedition relieving the besieged legations, apparently had no such criticisms.

However, the high velocity 6 mm round was ahead of its time in terms of powder technology and barrel steel metallurgy. In addition to complaints of bore fouling with corrosive nitro-compounds M1895 rifles in service began to display signs of early barrel wear and throat erosion caused by inconsistent chamber pressures and powder burn rates, despite the Navy's requirement of nickel-steel barrels.

Several factors led to the discontinuance of the 6mm Lee as an official U.S. military cartridge. The most important was the decision of the war department, based upon a recommendation by a board composed of Army, Navy, and Marine Corps officers, to standardize on the .30 Army cartridge for all services. Additionally, the 6 mm's special—and expensive—semi-rimless beveled-rim case was designed to work optimally in the charger clips of the M1895 rifle. This proved an unnecessary complication when adapting the cartridge to other, more modern machine guns and small arms. Aside from the benefits of interchangeability between the services, the board noted the government had its greatest investment in the .30 Army cartridge and rifles chambered for it. Nevertheless, the board acknowledged the rimmed .30 Army round was less than ideal when used in modern machine guns, and the decision to adopt it for the Navy and Marine Corps might be postponed until a rimless version was developed (which would eventually take place in 1903 in the form of the .30-03).

Another factor in the demise of the 6mm Lee was its bullet; the 6 mm Lee was adopted prior to the invention of the spitzer-shape bullet. As a result, the light, roundnosed 6 mm bullet lost much of its effectiveness at 600–700 yards, while the 220-grain (0.50 oz; 14 g) round-nosed bullet of the .30 Army service cartridge was still considered effective at ranges of 1,000 yards or more, an important consideration in the days when rifle and indirect machine gun fire at distant targets such as massed enemy infantry was considered necessary. While by no means a universal opinion, the lack of shocking power of the 6mm Lee reported by some Marine units in combat may also have weighed against the idea of delaying a change to the .30 Army for all services. A further complication was that issues of barrel wear from the Rifleite smokeless powder and corrosive primer used in the 6 mm cartridge continued to plague Navy ordnance authorities. Finally, due in part to its long, thick-gauged semi-rimless rim case and beveled rim, the 6mm Lee was one of the most expensive service cartridges to produce in terms of cost per round, yet it was already becoming obsolescent in comparison to ammunition that used more efficient powders and true rimless cases. Rapid developments in military small arms ammunition would soon demonstrate the advantages of a magazine-fed rifle and machine gun cartridge with a rimless case and spitzer bullet, features not found in either the .30 Army or the 6mm Lee.

In 1899, the Navy officially adopted the .30 Army cartridge for all small arms, though it continued to use the 6 mm for existing stocks of Lee rifles and Colt machine guns. In 1907, the Navy adopted the .30-06 Springfield cartridge for both rifles and machine guns. In 1917, the remaining 6mm Lee ammunition still in military stores was auctioned off, and sold to F.W. Bannerman & Co, a private military surplus dealer. Unfortunately for Bannerman, the powder used in these cartridges had deteriorated so much they were determined to be unfit for sale, and the company destroyed the entire lot rather than reselling them to the public.

== Commercial and hunting use ==
A commercial sporting version of the M1895 Lee Straight Pull was sold by Winchester. It did not sell well in U.S. markets due to a heavy preference by American consumers for lever-action rifle designs. The cartridge was chambered for a time in the Remington-Lee and Blake magazine-fed rifles. With a reputation for penetration power and explosive effect, the 6mm Lee was reportedly quite popular as a hunting cartridge in Alaska and Northwest Canada. It was discontinued from commercial production in 1935. The 6mm Lee cartridge case later served as the basis for the .220 Swift, which used a necked-down 6mm Lee case with a .22-caliber bullet.

== See also ==
- 6 mm caliber
- List of cartridges by caliber
- List of rifle cartridges

== Sources ==
- Barnes, Frank C., ed. by John T. Amber. "6mm Lee Navy", in Cartridges of the World, pp. 73 & 123. Northfield, IL: DBI Books, 1972. ISBN 0-695-80326-3.
