= Douglas Islands =

Island group in Antarctica

- Location within Antarctica

Geography
- Location: Antarctica
- Coordinates: 67°23′S 63°22′E

Administration
- Administered under the Antarctic Treaty System

Demographics
- Population: Uninhabited

The Douglas Islands are two small islands 22 kilometres (12 nmi) northwest of Cape Daly, and 6 kilometres (3 nmi) north of Andersen Island, as well as 7 kilometres (4 nmi) north-east of Child Rocks, which are both part of the Robinson Group. The islands lie off the coast of Mac. Robertson Land in Antarctica.

They were discovered by the British Australian New Zealand Antarctic Research Expedition under Douglas Mawson, 1929–1931, and named for Vice-Admiral Percy Douglas, then hydrographer of the Royal Navy. The islands were first sighted during an aircraft flight from the RRS Discovery on December 31, 1929, and reported to lie at about 66°40′S 64°30′E, but after the 1931 voyage they were placed at 67°20′S 63°32′E.

In 1956, an Australian National Antarctic Research Expeditions sledge party led by P.W. Crohn was unable to find them in this position, but found two uncharted islands farther south to which the name has now been applied.

== See also ==
- List of Antarctic and sub-Antarctic islands
