= Austskjera =

- Location within Antarctica

Geography
- Location: Antarctica
- Coordinates: 67°31′S 64°0′E

Administration
- Administered under the Antarctic Treaty System

Demographics
- Population: Uninhabited

Austskjera is a group of rocks (skerries) in Antarctica, lying close to the coast about 9 kilometres (5 nmi) east of Cape Daly, 4 kilometres (2 nmi) east-southeast of Safety Island, and 3 kilometres (1.5 nmi) east-southeast of Landmark Point. They were mapped by Norwegian cartographers from aerial photographs taken by the Lars Christensen Expedition, 1936–37, and named "Austskjera" (the "east skerry").
