= Auster =

Auster may refer to:

== Places ==
- Auster Glacier, located in East Antarctica
- Auster Islands, East Antarctica
- Auster Pass, located in East Antarctica
- Auster Point, located in West Antarctica

== Other uses ==
- Auster Aircraft, a former British aircraft manufacturer
- Auster (surname)
- Auster rookery, an Emperor penguin rookery in Antarctica
- 19861 Auster, an asteroid
- Taylorcraft Auster, a British WW2 military liaison and observation aircraft
- Auster (wind), the south wind in Roman mythology
