= Thorgaut Island =

Island off Antarctica

Coordinates: 67°27′S 63°33′E

Thorgaut Island is an island off Antarctica, the largest island in the northeast part of the Robinson Group, lying 7 nautical miles (13 km) northwest of Cape Daly on the coast of Antarctica, 4 nautical miles (7 km) east of Andersen Island, and 3 to 4 nautical miles (5 – 6 km) north-west of Kirton Island and Macklin Island, which are also part of the Robinson Group.

The islands were sighted in 1931 by the crew of the Norwegian whaling ships Thorgaut and Robinson. The name Robinson was applied to the group, and the name Thorgaut to its most conspicuous member.

== See also ==
- List of Antarctic and sub-Antarctic islands
