= Rook rifle =

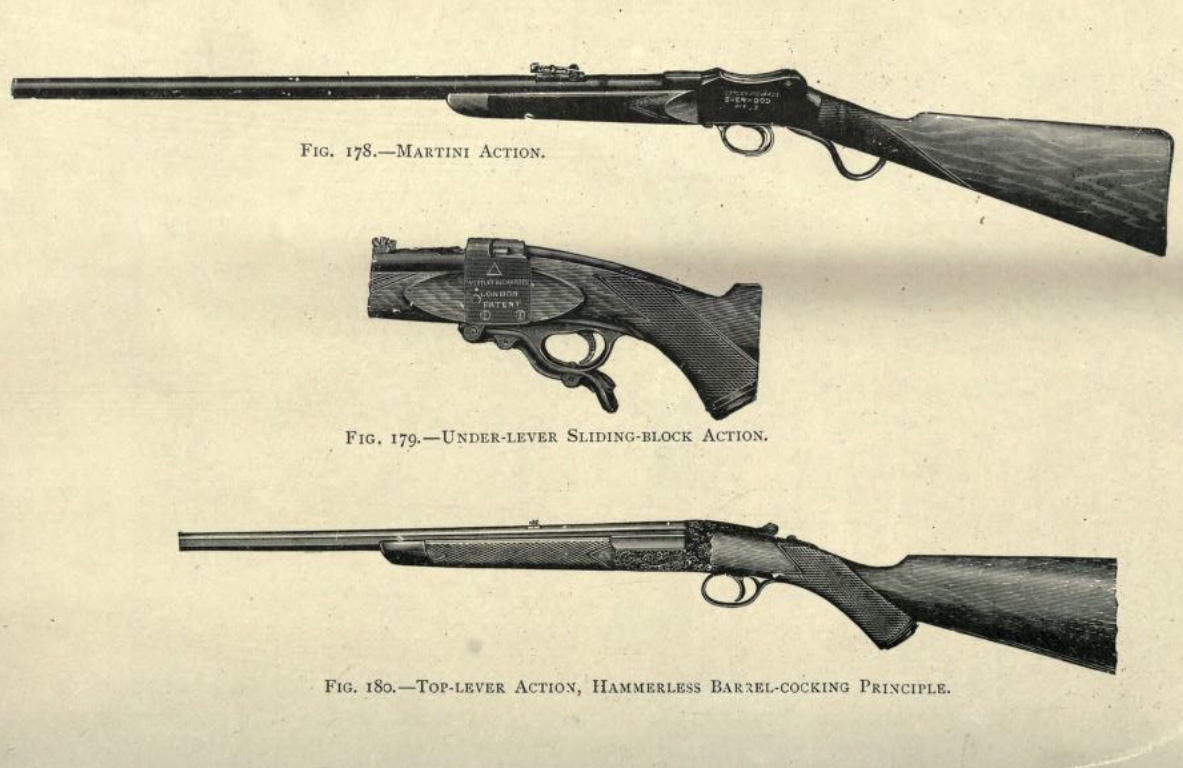
- Typical single shot rook rifle actions.
- Type: Hunting rifle
- Place of origin: United Kingdom

Production history
- Designed: 1883
- Manufacturer: Holland & Holland; Westley Richards; W.W. Greener & others

Specifications
- Action: Single-shot, with break-open or Martini versions

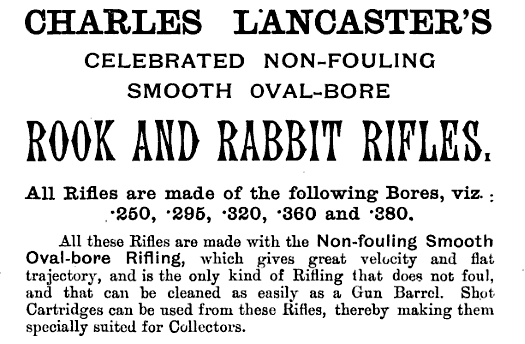
An 1892 advertisement for rook and rabbit rifles by the Charles Lancaster company.

The rook rifle, originally called the rook and rabbit rifle, is an obsolete English single-shot small calibre rifle intended for shooting small game, particularly rook shooting.

== Design ==
The rook rifle was designed to be light enough to be carried for a walk in the country, accurate and powerful enough to take small game and usually elegant in balance, fit and finish. Almost always single-shot, various actions were used including break-open actions, but the miniature Martini, a scaled-down version of the military Martini-Henry, was a favourite due to its strength and accuracy.

The first rook rifles fired .295 in (7.5 mm) calibre 80 gr (5.2 g) bullets, although subsequently a number of cartridges were developed for this purpose ranging in calibre from .22 to .38 in (5.6–9.7 mm) and firing 40 to 145 gr (2.6–9.4 g) bullets at the usual black powder velocities of 1,200 to 1,500 ft/s (370–460 m/s).

== History ==
The rook rifle was developed in 1883 by the gun-makers Holland & Holland as a breech-loading equivalent of the muzzle-loading pea rifle. Holland & Holland made a particular specialty of producing rook rifles, reportedly selling around 5,000 of them in the late 1800s. Westley Richards and W.W. Greener were also noted for their rook rifles.

Rook rifles were used extensively both in Britain and throughout the British Empire with large numbers being exported to many Commonwealth countries and colonial territories.

The rise in popularity of the .22 Long Rifle cartridge in the United Kingdom spelled the end of the rook rifle and its cartridges; due to its combination of accuracy, lower noise, and economy, .22 LR superseded the various English centrefire rook rifle rounds in the early 1900s. Over the same period miniature rifle target shooting moved towards shorter ranges and indoor competitions, again being better suited to the .22 Long Rifle round.

Due to the increasing scarcity of rook rifle cartridges, many rook rifles were converted to smoothbore shotguns, usually to .410 bores, and many others were sleeved down to .22 in (5.6 mm) calibre.

== Use ==
As indicated by its name, the rook rifle's intended quarry was small game including rooks and rabbits.

The rook tends to live in colonies known as rookeries, which over time grow and become nuisances in country areas. In rural Britain it was previously the practice to hold rook shoots where the juvenile birds, known as branchers, were shot before they were able to fly. These events, traditionally held on 12th May, were both very social and a source of food (the rook becomes inedible once mature) as the rook and rabbit pie was considered a great delicacy.

Whilst usually limited to smaller game, the larger calibre cartridges are very capable for hunting larger game such as roe deer, smaller antelope and similar sized game.

== In culture ==
A rook rifle features prominently in Agatha Christie's short story The Tragedy at Marsdon Manor and novel Curtain: Poirot's Last Case.

A rook rifle is revealed to have been used as a murder weapon in Season 10, Episode 7 of the British ITV series Grantchester.

== Rook rifle cartridges ==
- .220 Rook
- .297/230 Morris
- .320/230 Rook
- .297/250 Rook
- .300/250 Rook
- .255 Jeffery Rook
- .300 Rook
- .300 Sherwood
- .310/300 Rook
- .360/300 Fraser
- .310 Cadet
- .320 Extra Long Rook
- .320 Long Rifle
- .360 No 5 Rook
- .380 Long
- .410 Indian musket
- .442 Rook, Kangaroo, long
