= .360 No. 5 Rook =

Centerfire rifle cartridge

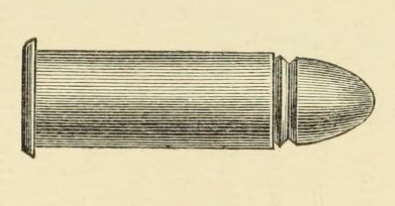
- Type: Rifle & pistol
- Place of origin: United Kingdom

Production history
- Designed: Pre-1880

Specifications
- Case type: Rimmed, straight
- Bullet diameter: .362 in (9.2 mm)
- Neck diameter: .375 in (9.5 mm)
- Base diameter: .380 in (9.7 mm)
- Rim diameter: .432 in (11.0 mm)
- Case length: 1.05 in (27 mm)
- Overall length: 1.45 in (37 mm)

Ballistic performance
Bullet mass/type	Velocity	Energy
82 gr (5 g) Lead	UNK	UNK
125 gr (8 g) Lead	1,050 ft/s (320 m/s)	310 ft⋅lbf (420 J)
134 gr (9 g) Lead	1,025 ft/s (312 m/s)	312 ft⋅lbf (423 J)
145 gr (9 g) Lead	1,075 ft/s (328 m/s)	373 ft⋅lbf (506 J)
- Source: Cartridges of the World.

The .360 No. 5 Rook / 9.2x27mmR is an obsolete centerfire rifle cartridge.

== Overview ==
The .360 No. 5 Rook is a straight rimmed cartridge originally designed for hunting small game and target shooting in rook rifles, although it was also used as a pistol cartridge.

The .360 No. 5 Rook was introduced between 1875 and 1880 by lengthening the older .380 Long cartridge. This cartridge was initially available in both 134 gr (8.7 g) rifle loadings and 125 gr (8.1 g) pistol loadings, both cartridges being interchangeable. Shot and blank cartridges were also available.

As with other rook rifle cartridges, the .360 No. 5 Rook was superseded as a small game hunting and target cartridge by the .22 Long Rifle.

== See also ==
- 9 mm rifle cartridges
- List of rifle cartridges
- List of rimmed cartridges
- Rook rifle
