= .300 Rook =

Centerfire rifle cartridge

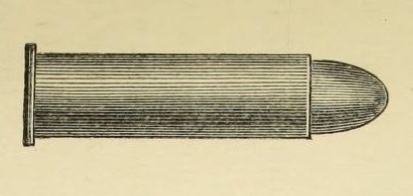
- Type: Rifle
- Place of origin: United Kingdom

Specifications
- Case type: Rimmed, straight
- Bullet diameter: .300 in (7.6 mm)
- Neck diameter: .317 in (8.1 mm)
- Base diameter: .319 in (8.1 mm)
- Rim diameter: .369 in (9.4 mm)
- Case length: 1.17 in (30 mm)
- Overall length: 1.38 in (35 mm)

Ballistic performance
Bullet mass/type	Velocity	Energy
80 gr (5 g) Lead	1,100 ft/s (340 m/s)	215 ft⋅lbf (292 J)
- Source: Cartridges of the World.

The .300 Rook / 7.6x30mmR, also known as the .295 Rook (by Holland & Holland only), is an obsolete intermediate centerfire rifle cartridge.

== Overview ==
The .300 Rook is a rimmed cartridge originally designed for use in rook rifles for hunting small game and target shooting.

It was loaded with an 80 gr (5.2 g) solid lead bullet driven by 10 gr (0.65 g) of black powder at a standard muzzle velocity of 1,100 ft/s (340 m/s). A variant, the short lived .300 Rook target, was loaded with a heavier 110 gr (7.1 g) bullet as it was felt the original loading was too light for distance target shooting, as wind had an effect on the trajectory as well as bullet drop over longer distances.

== History ==
The origins of the .300 Rook are uncertain although it was introduced before 1874, it became one of the most popular British rook cartridges, also being chambered in several revolvers. In later years its popularity was eroded by the .255 Jeffery Rook and to Holland & Holland's .297/250 Rook.

The .300 Rook cartridge case was lengthened to create the .300 Sherwood, which in turn superseded the .300 Rook target variant. As with other rook rifle cartridges, the .300 Rook was superseded by the .22 Long Rifle.

== See also ==
- Rook rifle
- List of rifle cartridges
- List of rimmed cartridges
- 7 mm rifle cartridges
