= .297/250 Rook =

Centerfire rifle cartridge

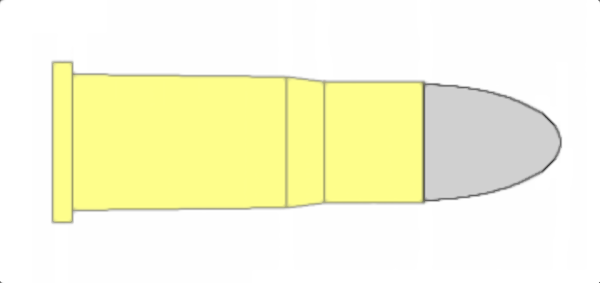
- Type: Rifle
- Place of origin: United Kingdom

Production history
- Designer: Holland & Holland
- Designed: Pre-1880s

Specifications
- Parent case: .297/230 Morris
- Case type: Rimmed, bottleneck
- Bullet diameter: .250 in (6.4 mm)
- Neck diameter: .267 in (6.8 mm)
- Shoulder diameter: .294 in (7.5 mm)
- Base diameter: .295 in (7.5 mm)
- Rim diameter: .343 in (8.7 mm)
- Case length: .83 in (21 mm)
- Overall length: 1.1 in (28 mm)
- Primer type: Kynoch # 69

Ballistic performance
Bullet mass/type	Velocity	Energy
56 gr (4 g)	1,100 ft/s (340 m/s)	150 ft⋅lbf (200 J)
- Sources: Cartridges of the World, & Modern sporting gunnery.

The .297/250 Rook / 6.4x21mmR is an obsolete centerfire rifle cartridge developed by Holland & Holland.

== Overview ==
The .297/250 Rook is a bottlenecked rimmed cartridge originally designed for use in rook rifles for hunting small game and target shooting.

This cartridge was introduced by Holland & Holland some time before 1880 by blowing out the neck of the .297/230 Morris Long to .250 in (6.4 mm). This cartridge is a contemporary of the .255 Jeffery Rook and upon their release the pair competed heavily with the very popular .300 Rook.

As with other rook rifle cartridges, the .297/250 Rook was superseded by the .22 Long Rifle.

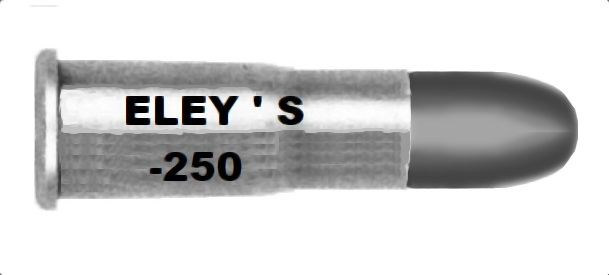
Eley's .297/250 Rook rifle cartridge.

== Dimensions ==
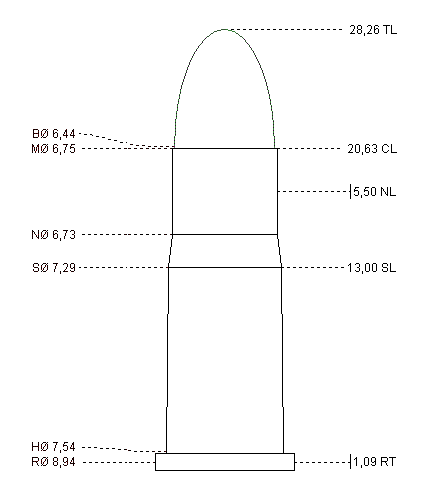

== See also ==
- Rook rifle
- List of rifle cartridges
- List of rimmed cartridges
- 6 mm rifle cartridges
