= Safety Island =

Island in Antarctica

- Location within Antarctica

Geography
- Location: Mac. Robertson Land
- Coordinates: 67°31′00″S 63°54′00″E

Safety Island (67°31′S 63°54′E) is a small coastal island 4.8 km (3 mi) east of Cape Daly, Antarctica, 9 km (6 mi) south of Auster Islands, and 0.9 km (0.6 mi) northwest of Landmark Point. Mapped by Norwegian cartographers from aerial photographs taken by the Lars Christensen Expedition, 1936–37. First visited in 1954 by an ANARE (Australian National Antarctic Research Expeditions) party led by R.G. Dovers, and so named because it was the nearest safe camp site to Scullin Monolith.

== See also ==
- List of Antarctic and sub-Antarctic islands
