= Landmark Point =

Landmark Point (67°31′S 63°56′E) is a rocky point lying 1 kilometre (0.5 nmi) southeast of Safety Island, on the coast of Mac. Robertson Land, Antarctica. It was mapped from Australian National Antarctic Research Expeditions surveys and air photos, 1956–66, and was so named by the Antarctic Names Committee of Australia because it is almost due south from Auster Rookery and affords an excellent landmark if approaching the rookery along the coast from Mawson Station.
