= Macklin Island =

Island of Antarctica

- Location within Antarctica

Geography
- Location: Antarctica
- Coordinates: 67°29′S 63°39′E
- Archipelago: Robinson Islands
- Length: 0.5 km (0.31 mi)
- Width: 0.4 km (0.25 mi)

Administration
- Administered under the Antarctic Treaty System

Demographics
- Population: Uninhabited

Macklin Island is a small island in the eastern part of the Robinson Group, about 3 kilometres (1.5 nmi) north of Kirton Island, and 6 kilometres (3 nmi) northwest of Cape Daly, Mac. Robertson Land, Antarctica. It was mapped by Norwegian cartographers from air photos taken by the Lars Christensen Expedition, 1936–37, and was named by the Antarctic Names Committee of Australia for E.L. Macklin, a radio officer at Mawson Station in 1955 and 1959.

== Important Bird Area ==
A 195 ha site, which comprises Macklin Island and neighbouring Kirton Island, along with associated smaller islands and the intervening marine area, has been designated an Important Bird Area (IBA) by BirdLife International because it supports about 13,000 breeding pairs of Adélie penguins, based on 2006 satellite imagery.

== See also ==
- List of Antarctic and sub-Antarctic islands
