= .297/230 Morris =

Pistol and rifle cartridges

.297/230 Morris Short
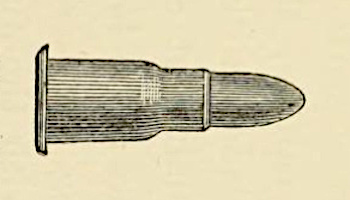
- Type: Rifle & pistol
- Place of origin: United Kingdom

Specifications
- Case type: Rimmed, bottleneck
- Bullet diameter: .225 in (5.7 mm)
- Neck diameter: .240 in (6.1 mm)
- Shoulder diameter: .274 in (7.0 mm)
- Base diameter: .294 in (7.5 mm)
- Rim diameter: .347 in (8.8 mm)
- Case length: .58 in (15 mm)
- Overall length: .89 in (23 mm)
- Primer type: Kynoch # 69

Ballistic performance
Bullet mass/type	Velocity	Energy
37 gr (2 g) Lead	875 ft/s (267 m/s)	62 ft⋅lbf (84 J)
- Source: Cartridges of the World.

.297/230 Morris Long
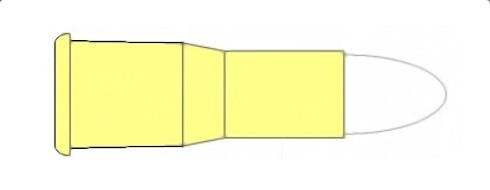
- Type: Rifle

Specifications
- Case type: Rimmed, bottleneck
- Bullet diameter: .225 in (5.7 mm)
- Neck diameter: .240 in (6.1 mm)
- Shoulder diameter: .274 in (7.0 mm)
- Base diameter: .295 in (7.5 mm)
- Rim diameter: .345 in (8.8 mm)
- Case length: .80 in (20 mm)
- Overall length: 1.1 in (28 mm)
- Primer type: Kynoch # 69

Ballistic performance
Bullet mass/type	Velocity	Energy
37 gr (2 g) Lead	1,200 ft/s (370 m/s)	118 ft⋅lbf (160 J)
- Source: Cartridges of the World.

The .297/230 Morris Short and .297/230 Morris Long are two obsolete centerfire firearm cartridges developed as sub-caliber training rounds for the British Martini–Henry rifle.

== Design ==
The .297/230 Morris Short and .297/230 Morris Long are both rimmed bottlenecked centrefire miniature rifle and pistol cartridges.

=== .297/230 Morris Short ===
The .297/230 Morris Short fired a 37 gr (2.4 g) lead projectile driven by 3.25 gr (0.211 g) of black powder at 875 ft/s (267 m/s).

=== .297/230 Morris Long ===
The .297/230 Morris Long fired a 37 gr lead projectile driven by 5.5 gr (0.36 g) of black powder at 1,200 ft/s (370 m/s).

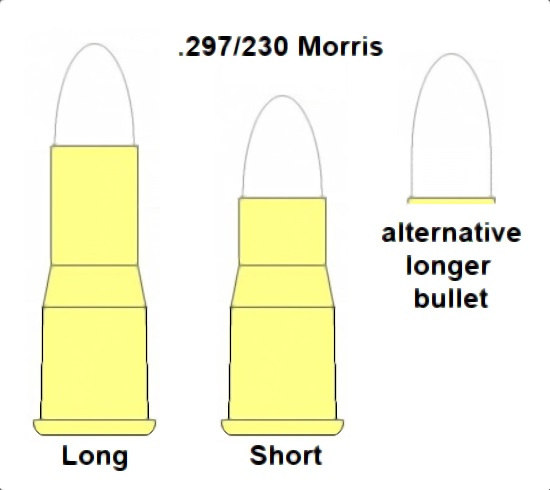

== History ==
The .297/230 Morris cartridges were produced for use in the Morris Aiming Tube, a commercial sub-calibre barrel inserted into the barrel of a large bore rifle or pistol for training or short range target practice. The Morris Aiming Tube worked well enough for it to be adopted for service in August 1883 by both the British Army and the Royal Navy for use in the Martini-Henry rifle.

The Morris Aiming Tube was later adapted for use in the .303 British Martini-Metford rifle, the Lee–Metford rifle in 1891 and the Webley Revolver, with both the .297/230 Morris Short and the .297/230 Morris Long being fired through the tubes. In the Lee-Metford rifle, the Morris Tube and the .297/230 cartridge were not particularly accurate and were replaced after 1908 by a new .22 in (5.6 mm) tube firing the rimfire .22 Long Rifle cartridge which was more accurate, quieter and much cheaper.

Birmingham Small Arms Company produced Martini actioned rook rifles chambered in these cartridges, and some European single shot pistols and rifles were also chambered in them. The cartridges were still manufactured by Eley Brothers and Kynoch as late as 1962.

In the 1890s Holland & Holland developed the .297/250 Rook cartridge by blowing out the neck of the .297/230 Morris Long cartridge to .250 in (6.4 mm).

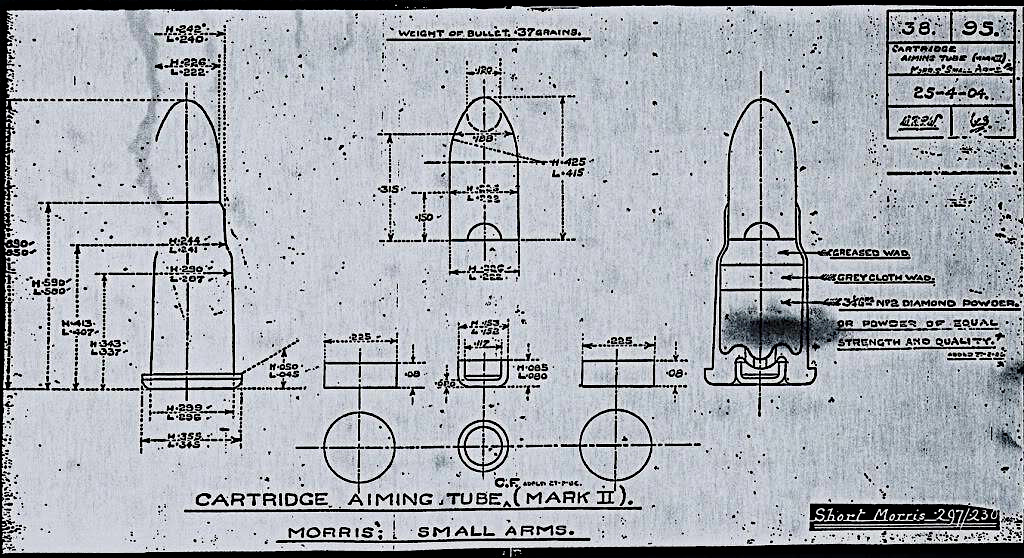
.297-230 Morris short specification chart.

== See also ==
- List of rifle cartridges
- 5 mm rifle cartridges
- Rook rifle
