= Kirton Island =

Island of Antarctica

- Location within Antarctica

Geography
- Location: Antarctica
- Coordinates: 67°30′S 63°38′E
- Archipelago: Robinson Islands
- Length: 0.6 km (0.37 mi)
- Width: 0.3 km (0.19 mi)

Administration
- Administered under the Antarctic Treaty System

Demographics
- Population: Uninhabited

Kirton Island is a small coastal island of the Robinson Group, lying 6 kilometres (3 nmi) west of Cape Daly, Mac. Robertson Land, Antarctica, and about 3 kilometres (1.5 nmi) south of Macklin Island. It was mapped by Norwegian cartographers from air photos taken by the Lars Christensen Expedition, 1936–37, and was named by the Antarctic Names Committee of Australia for M. Kirton, a geophysicist at Mawson Station in 1959.

== Important Bird Area ==
A 195 ha site, which comprises Kirton Island and neighbouring Macklin Island, along with associated smaller islands and the intervening marine area, has been designated an Important Bird Area (IBA) by BirdLife International because it supports about 13,000 breeding pairs of Adélie penguins, based on 2006 satellite imagery.

== See also ==
- List of Antarctic and Subantarctic islands
