= .220 Rook =

Centerfire rifle cartridge

- Place of origin: United Kingdom

Production history
- Designed: 1880s

Specifications
- Case type: Rimmed, straight
- Bullet diameter: .224 in (5.7 mm)
- Neck diameter: .238 in (6.0 mm)
- Base diameter: .239 in (6.1 mm)
- Rim diameter: .279 in (7.1 mm)
- Rim thickness: .043 in (1.1 mm)
- Case length: .742 in (18.8 mm)
- Overall length: .939 in (23.9 mm)

Ballistic performance
Bullet mass/type	Velocity	Energy
30 gr (2 g)	UNK	UNK
- Sources: The Encyclopædia of Sport & Games.

The .220 Rook / 5.7x18mmR, also known as the .220 Long Centrefire, is an obsolete British centerfire rifle cartridge.

== Overview ==
The .220 Rook is a rimmed cartridge originally designed for use in rook rifles. It was designed and produced in Britain in the 1880s. It is believed to be an early centrefire version of the .22 Long Rifle rimfire cartridge.

The .220 Rook fired a bullet of 30 grains (1.9 g) weight driven by 5 grains (0.32 g) of black powder, it was designed for hunting small game and target shooting, although many considered it too small for practical hunting purposes.

== See also ==
- List of rifle cartridges
- List of rimmed cartridges
- 5 mm rifle cartridges
