= Auster Islands =

Island group in Antarctica

Auster Island
- Location within Antarctica

Geography
- Location: Antarctica
- Coordinates: 67°25′S 63°50′E

Administration
- Administered under the Antarctic Treaty System

Demographics
- Population: Uninhabited

The Auster Islands are a group of small islands at the northeast end of the Robinson Group, located 10 km (5.5 nmi) north of Cape Daly, Mac. Robertson Land. They were mapped from Australian National Antarctic Research Expeditions (ANARE) surveys and from air photos 1959–66, and so named by the Antarctic Names Committee of Australia because of the nearness of the islands to Auster rookery, and because they have provided a camp site for ANARE parties visiting the rookery.

== See also ==
- List of Antarctic and sub-Antarctic islands
