= Child Rocks =

Group of rocks in Antarctica

- Location within Antarctica

Geography
- Location: Antarctica
- Coordinates: 67°26′S 63°16′E

Administration
- Administered under the Antarctic Treaty System

Demographics
- Population: Uninhabited

The Child Rocks are a group of rocks at the west end of the Robinson Group off the coast of Mac. Robertson Land, 3.7 kilometres (2 nmi) west of Andersen Island. They were mapped by Norwegian cartographers from air photos taken by the Lars Christensen Expedition, 1936–1937, and named "Vestskjera" (the west skerries). They were renamed by the Antarctic Names Committee of Australia for J.B. Child, Third Officer of the RSS Discovery during the British Australian New Zealand Antarctic Research Expedition, 1929–1931.
