= Auster (surname) =

Auster is a surname. Notable people with the surname include:

- Daniel Auster (1893–1963), mayor of Jerusalem in the final years of the British Mandate of Palestine
- Ellen Auster (born ?), Canadian professor of strategic management
- Lawrence Auster (1949–2013), American traditionalist conservative blogger and essayist
- Lydia Auster (1912–1993), Estonian composer
- Paul Auster (1947–2024), American writer and film director
- Sophie Auster (born 1987), American actress and singer
