= Rook shooting =

Bird shooting sport

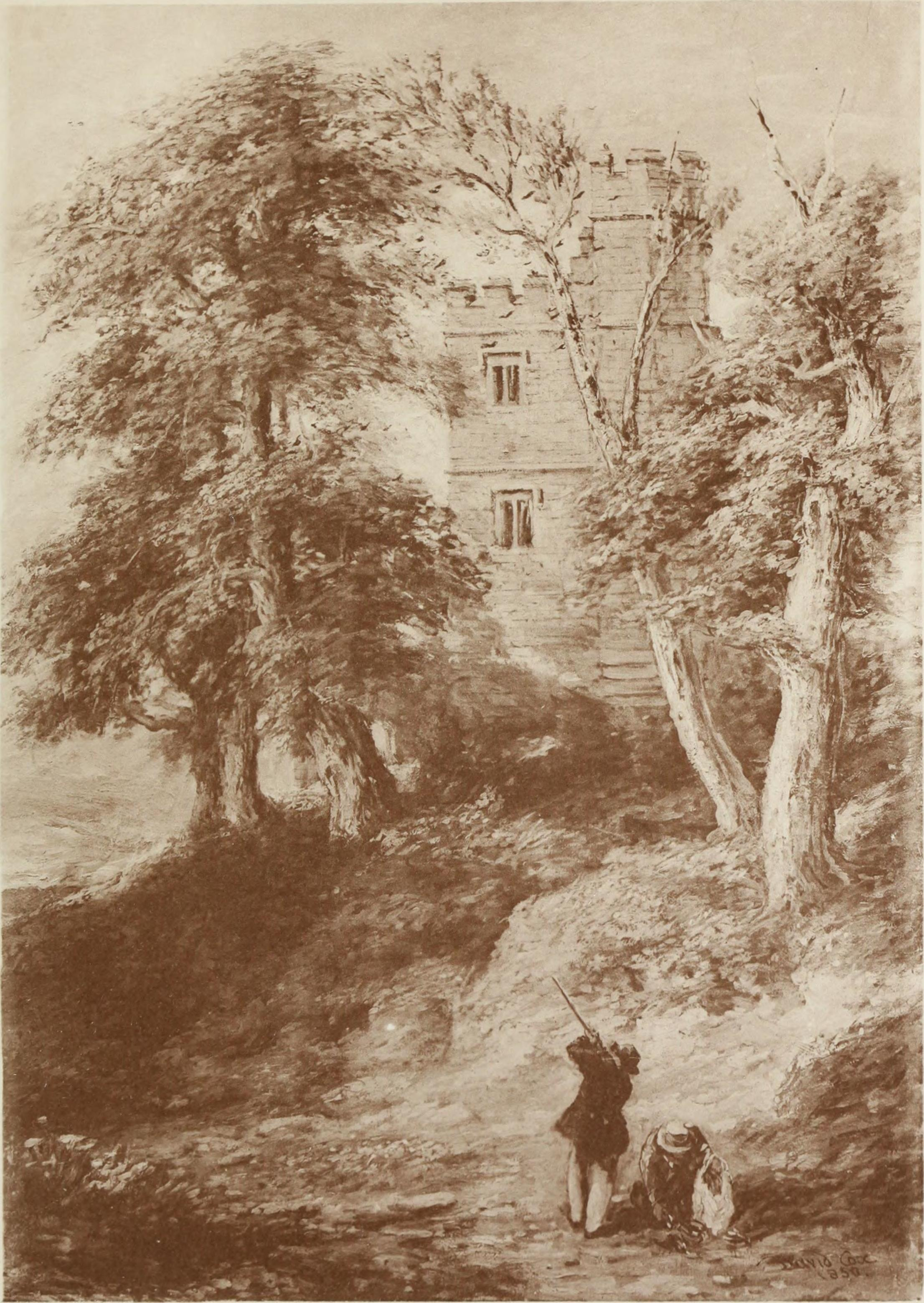
1850 illustration of rook shooting at Haddon Hall, by David Cox

Rook shooting was a previously popular sport in the United Kingdom, in which young rooks were shot from tree branches, often using purpose-built rifles known as rook rifles. Rook shooting could serve as a form of pest control, a blood sport making living targets of animals, or a form of hunting for edible birds.

The rook tends to live in colonies known as rookeries, which over time grow and become nuisances to some inhabitants in rural areas. In rural Britain it was previously the practice to hold rook shoots where the juvenile birds, known as "branchers", were shot before they were able to fly. These events were both very social and a source of food (the rook becomes inedible once mature) as the rook and rabbit pie was considered a great delicacy.
