= Andersen Island =

Island in Antarctica

- Location within Antarctica

Geography
- Location: Antarctica
- Coordinates: 67°26′S 63°22′E

Administration
- Administered under the Antarctic Treaty System

Demographics
- Population: Uninhabited

Andersen Island is an island 7 kilometres (4 nmi) west of Thorgaut Island, and 4 kilometres (2 nmi) east of Child Rocks, in the Robinson Group, Antarctica. It was mapped by the British Australian New Zealand Antarctic Research Expedition under Douglas Mawson in February 1931. The island was also charted from the whaler Thorgaut about the same time. It was named after Captain Lars Andersen of the whaler Falk who had assisted the Discovery with coal.

== Important Bird Area ==
A 111 ha site encompassing breeding colonies of some 13,000 pairs of Adélie penguins on Andersen Island and an unnamed island 1 km to the south-west has been identified as an Important Bird Area by BirdLife International.

== See also ==
- List of Antarctic and sub-Antarctic islands
