= .300 Sherwood =

Centerfire rifle cartridge

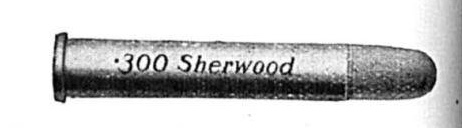
- Type: Rifle
- Place of origin: United Kingdom

Production history
- Designer: Westley Richards
- Designed: 1901
- Produced: 1901

Specifications
- Case type: Rimmed, straight
- Bullet diameter: .300 in (7.6 mm)
- Neck diameter: .318 in (8.1 mm)
- Base diameter: .320 in (8.1 mm)
- Rim diameter: .370 in (9.4 mm)
- Case length: 1.54 in (39 mm)
- Overall length: 2.02 in (51 mm)

Ballistic performance
Bullet mass/type	Velocity	Energy
140 gr (9 g)	1,400 ft/s (430 m/s)	610 ft⋅lbf (830 J)
- Source: Cartridges of the World.

The .300 Sherwood / 7.6×39mmR, also known as the .300 Extra Long and the .300 Westley, is an obsolete intermediate centerfire rifle cartridge developed by Westley Richards.

== Design ==
The .300 Sherwood is a straight, rimmed cartridge that fires a 140 gr (9.1 g) bullet, driven by 8.5 gr (0.55 g) of cordite, at a listed speed of 1,400 ft/s (430 m/s). The bullet calibre is .300 in (7.6 mm) as opposed to the more common .308 in (7.8 mm).

The cartridge was available in both solid lead and the then revolutionary LT-capped (Note: The LT-capped bullet was named after Leslie B Taylor (1863-1930) an engineer and lifelong employee at Westley Richards who, among many inventions, designs and patents, invented the ‘Capped Bullet’, a revolutionary bullet design that allowed for both maximum shock effect whilst ensuring maximum stability and accuracy.) bullets were available.

== History ==
The .300 Sherwood was introduced by Westley Richards in 1901 in response to W.W. Greener's .310 Cadet cartridge. The cartridge was created by lengthening the much milder .300 Rook.

As expected, the first rifles chambered for it were made by Westley Richards both in a miniature Martini actioned single-shot rifle and the "Sherwood" target rifle, a modified takedown Martini actioned rifle with an easily removable barrel and a detachable lock mechanism held in place by a thumb screw.

Later other manufacturers produced rifles in the caliber including BSA, Vickers and Francotte, whilst high end double rifles were produced by Holland & Holland and Westley Richards. As recently as 2002, Westley Richards produced a double rifle in the .300 Sherwood.

The .300 Sherwood was a notably accurate target round, but arrived at the point when miniature rifle shooting was moving towards the .22 Long Rifle, shorter ranges and more indoor competition.

== Use ==
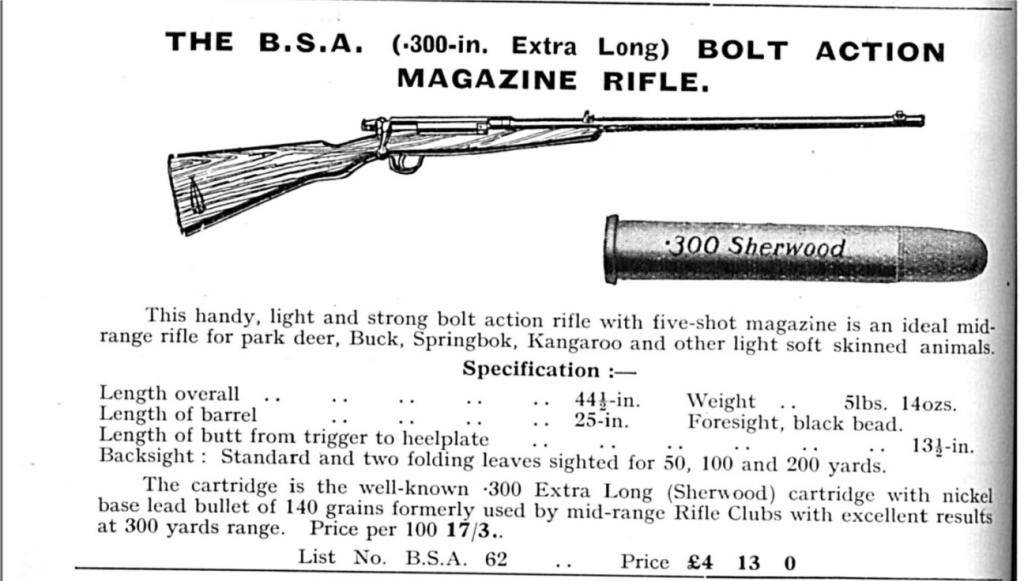
A page from the 1936 Parker catalogue

Whilst a noted target round, the .300 Sherwood was also used for hunting, it was considered more suited for small deer than for small game.

Henry Sharp, in his 1906 book Modern Sporting Gunnery, quotes hunters in British Columbia who used the .300 Sherwood to kill bears, bighorn sheep, and one verified caribou at 220 yd (200 m).

== See also ==
- List of rifle cartridges
- List of rimmed cartridges
- 7 mm rifle cartridges
