= Robinson Group =

Group of small islands in Antarctica

Robinson Group (67°27′S 63°27′E) is a group of small islands extending 16 km (10 mi) in an east–west direction, lying close northwest of Cape Daly. The group was observed by British Australian New Zealand Antarctic Research Expedition (BANZARE) under Mawson, 1931, who named it after W.S. Robinson of Melbourne, a patron of the expedition. Essentially the same islands were observed in 1931 by the crew of the Norwegian whale catcher Thorgaut, who gave them the name "Thorgautoyane". In concurrence with the recommendations by Antarctic Names Committee of Australia (ANCA), the name "Robinson" has been assigned to the whole group and the name "Thorgaut" to the most conspicuous island.

Robinson Group is made up of (running west-to-east) Child Rocks, Andersen Island, Thorgaut Island, Kirton Island, Macklin Island, and Auster Islands.
