= .380 Long =

Centerfire rifle cartridge

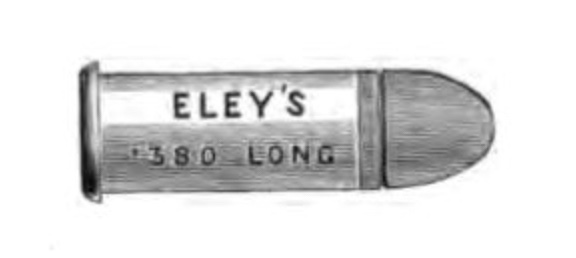
- Type: Rifle & pistol
- Place of origin: United Kingdom

Production history
- Designed: Early 1870s

Specifications
- Case type: Rimmed, straight
- Bullet diameter: .375 in (9.5 mm)
- Neck diameter: .379 in (9.6 mm)
- Base diameter: .380 in (9.7 mm)
- Rim diameter: .430 in (10.9 mm)
- Case length: .944 in (24.0 mm)
- Overall length: 1.34 in (34 mm)

Ballistic performance
Bullet mass/type	Velocity	Energy
124 gr (8 g) Lead	1,050 ft/s (320 m/s)	304 ft⋅lbf (412 J)
- Source: Cartridges of the World.

The .380 Long [9.8 x 24mmR], also known as the .380 Rook rifle, is an obsolete centerfire rifle cartridge.

== Overview ==
The .380 Long is a straight rimmed cartridge originally designed for use in rook rifles for target shooting and hunting game up to the size of smaller deer.

In addition to British munitions makers, the .380 Long was also made by DWM in Germany and a number of cheap European pistols were chambered for it. This cartridge is very similar to the .38 Long Colt and may have inspired the latter cartridge's development.

As with other rook rifle cartridges, the .380 Long was superseded as a small game hunting and target cartridge by the .22 Long Rifle. As a pistol cartridge, the .380 Long gradually lost favour to more modern rounds such as the .38 S&W.

== See also ==
- 9 mm rifle cartridges
- List of rifle cartridges
- List of rimmed cartridges
- Rook rifle
