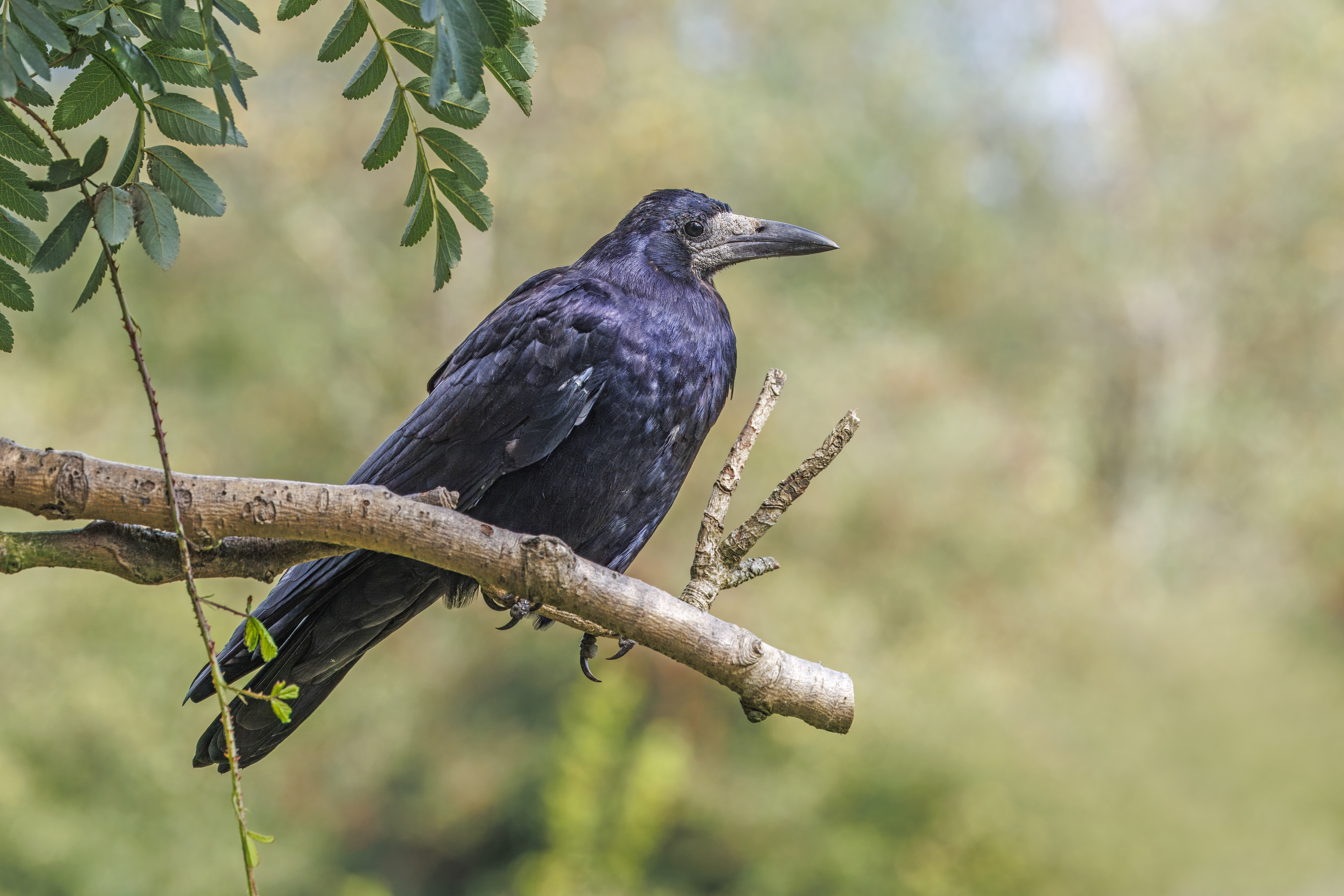
- Rook in England

Conservation status
- Least Concern (IUCN 3.1)

Scientific classification
- Kingdom: Animalia
- Phylum: Chordata
- Class: Aves
- Order: Passeriformes
- Family: Corvidae
- Genus: Corvus
- Species: C. frugilegus

Binomial name
- Corvus frugilegus Linnaeus, 1758
- Rook range Breeding Resident Non-breeding Extant & Introduced (resident)

= Rook (bird) =

Rook Temporal range: Late Pleistocene – Recent

Species of bird in the crow family Corvidae

The rook (Corvus frugilegus) is a member of the family Corvidae in the passerine order of birds. It is found in the Palearctic, its range extending from Scandinavia and western Europe to eastern Siberia. It is a large, gregarious, black-feathered bird, distinguished from similar species by the whitish featherless area on the face. Rooks nest collectively in the tops of tall trees, often close to farms or villages; the groups of nests are known as rookeries.

Rooks are mainly resident birds, but the northernmost populations may migrate southwards to avoid the harshest winter conditions. The birds form flocks in winter, often in the company of other Corvus species or jackdaws. They return to their rookeries, and breeding takes place in spring. They forage on arable land and pasture, probing the ground with their strong bills and feeding largely on grubs and soil-based invertebrates, but they also consume cereals and other plant material. Historically, farmers have accused the birds of damaging their crops and have made efforts to drive them away or kill them. Like other corvids, they are intelligent birds with complex behavioural traits and an ability to solve simple problems.

== Taxonomy and etymology ==
The rook was given its binomial name by the Swedish naturalist Carl Linnaeus in 1758 in his Systema Naturae. The binomial is from Latin; Corvus means "raven", and frugilegus means for "fruit-gathering". It is derived from frux (oblique frug-), meaning "fruit", and legere, meaning "to pick". The English-language common name rook is ultimately derived from the bird's harsh call. Two subspecies are recognised; the western rook (C. f. frugilegus) ranges from western Europe to southern Russia and extreme northwestern China, while the eastern rook (C. f. pastinator) ranges from central Siberia and northern Mongolia eastwards across the rest of Asia. Collective nouns for rooks include building, parliament, clamour and storytelling. Their colonial nesting behaviour gave rise to the term rookery.

== Description ==
The rook is a fairly large bird, at 280 to 340 g (9.9 to 12.0 oz) adult weight, 44 to 46 cm (17 to 18 in) in length and 81 to 99 cm (32 to 39 in) wingspan. It has black feathers that often show a blue or bluish-purple sheen in bright sunlight. The feathers on the head, neck and shoulders are particularly dense and silky. The legs and feet are generally black, the bill grey-black and the iris dark brown. In adults, a bare area of whitish skin in front of the eye and around the base of the bill is distinctive, and enables the rook to be distinguished from other members of the crow family. This bare patch gives the false impression that the bill is longer than it is and the head more domed. The feathering around the legs also appears shaggier and laxer than the similarly sized carrion crow, the only other member of its genus with which the rook is likely to be confused. Additionally, when seen in flight, the wings of a rook are proportionally longer and narrower than those of the carrion crow. The average lifespan is six years.

The juvenile plumage is black with a slight greenish gloss, except for the hind neck, back and underparts, which are brownish-black. The juvenile is superficially similar to a young crow because it lacks the bare patch at the base of the bill, but it has a thinner beak and loses the facial feathers after about six months.

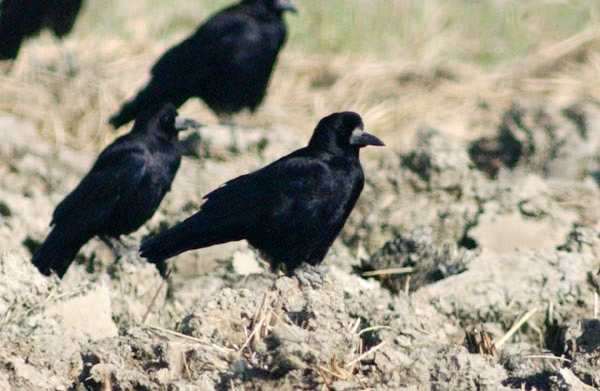
C. f. pastinator, Gunsan, South Korea

== Distribution and habitat ==
Western rooks are resident in Ireland, Britain and much of north and central Europe but vagrant to Iceland and parts of Scandinavia, where they typically live south of 60° latitude. They are found in habitats that common ravens dislike, choosing open agricultural areas with pasture or arable land, as long as there are suitable tall trees for breeding. They generally avoid forests, swamps, marshes, heaths and moorland. They are in general lowland birds, with most rookeries found below 120 m (400 ft), but where suitable feeding habitat exists, they may breed at 300 m (1,000 ft) or even higher. Rooks are often associated with human settlements, nesting near farms, villages and open towns, but not in large, heavily built-up areas. The eastern subspecies in Asia differs in being slightly smaller on average, and having a somewhat more fully feathered face. In the north of its range the species has a tendency to move south during autumn, and more southern populations are apt to range sporadically.

The species has been introduced into New Zealand, with several hundred birds being released there from 1862 to 1874. Although their range is very localised, the species is now regarded as an invasive pest and is the subject of active control by many local councils. This has wiped out the larger breeding colonies in New Zealand, and the remaining small groups have become more wary.

== Behaviour and ecology ==
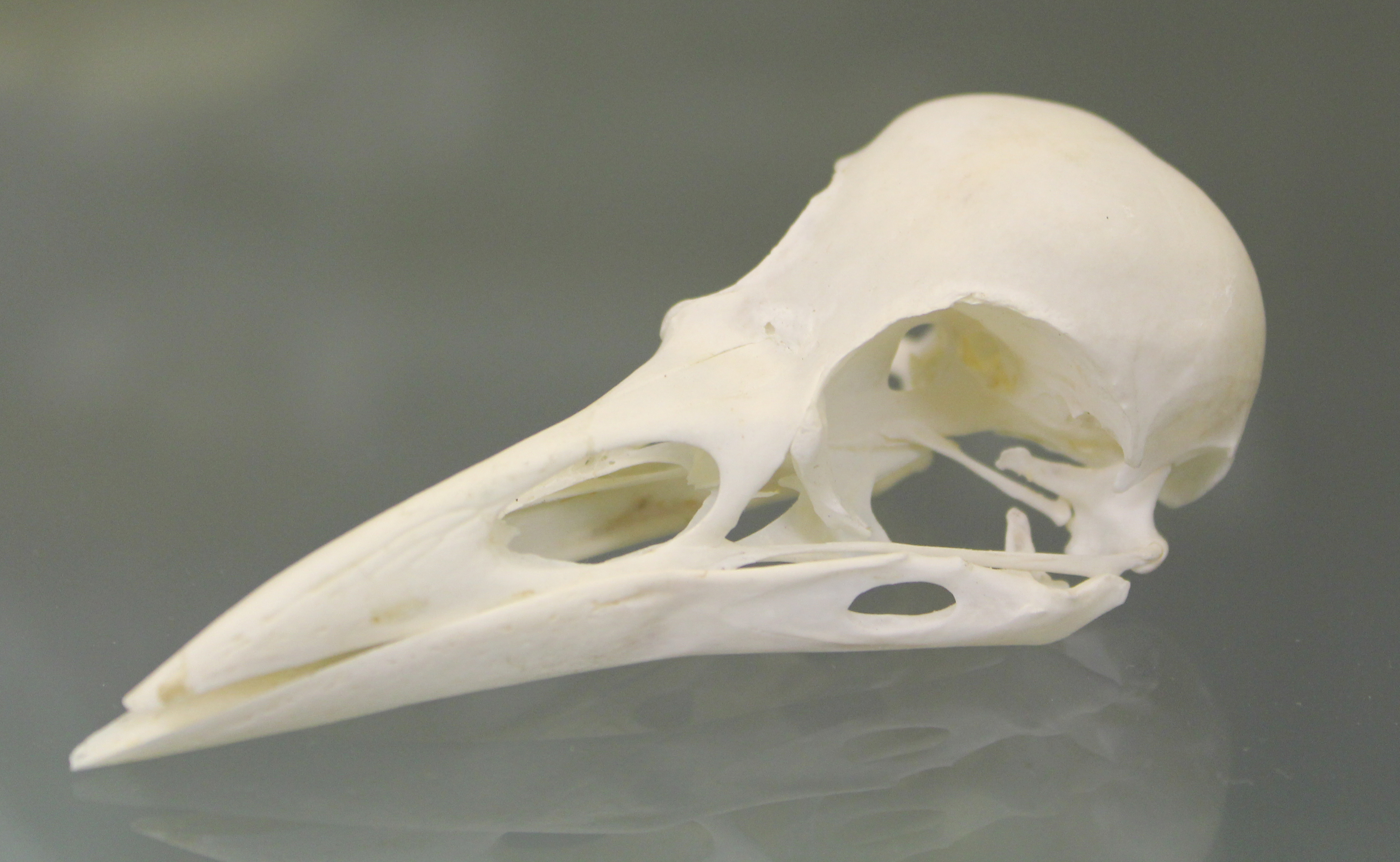
A rook skull

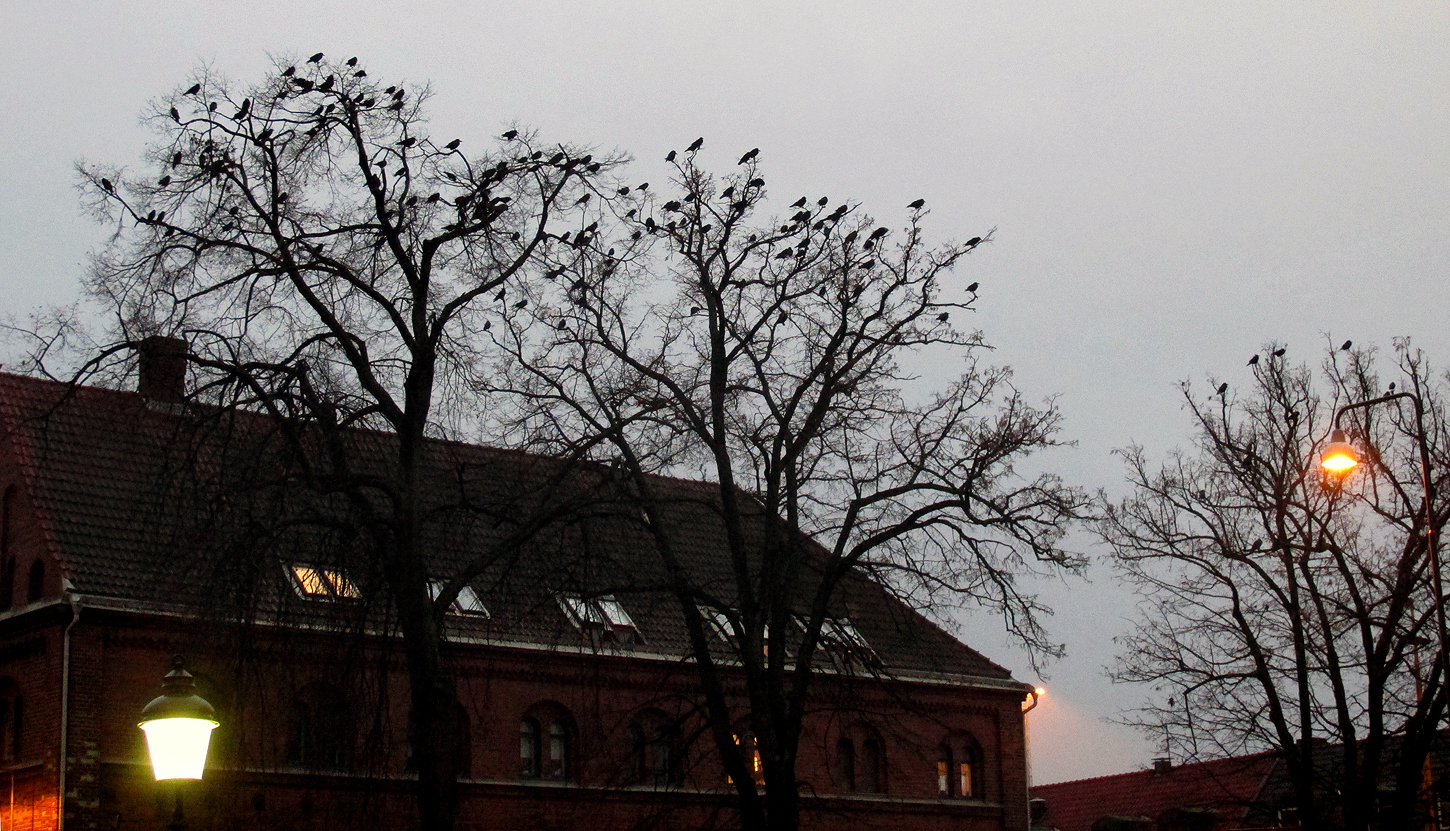
The rook is a very social bird; in the evenings they gather in large flocks, often in thousands.

Rooks are highly gregarious birds and are generally seen in flocks of various sizes. Males and females pair-bond for life and pairs stay together within flocks. In the evening, the birds often congregate at their rookery before moving off to their chosen communal roosting site. Flocks increase in size in autumn with different groups amalgamating and birds congregating at dusk before roosting, often in very large numbers and in the company of jackdaws. Roosting usually takes place in woodland or plantations, but a small minority of birds may continue to roost at their rookery all winter, and adult males may roost collectively somewhere nearby. The birds move off promptly in the morning, dispersing for distances of up to 10 km (6 mi).

Large groups of rooks (in breeding colonies or night roost sites) can contribute to changes in soil properties. The amount of ornithogenic material in these soils is very high.

Foraging mostly takes place on the ground, with the birds striding about, or occasionally hopping, and probing the soil with their powerful beaks. Flight is direct, with regular wingbeats and little gliding while in purposeful flight; in contrast, the birds may glide more extensively when wheeling about in leisure flight near the rookery. In the autumn, flocks sometimes perform spectacular aerial group flights, including synchronised movements and individual antics such as dives, tumbles and rolls.

=== Diet and feeding ===
Examination of stomach contents show that about 60% of the diet is vegetable matter and the rest is of animal origin. Vegetable foods include cereals, potatoes, roots, fruit, acorns, berries and seeds while the animal part is predominantly earthworms and insect larvae, which the bird finds by probing the ground with its strong bill. It also eats beetles, spiders, millipedes, slugs, snails, small mammals, small birds, their eggs and young, and occasionally carrion.

In urban sites, human food scraps are taken from rubbish dumps and streets, usually in the early hours or at dusk when it is relatively quiet. Like other corvids, rooks will sometimes favour sites with a high level of human interaction, and can often be found scavenging for food in tourist areas or pecking open garbage sacks. Rooks have even been trained to pick up litter in a theme park in France.

=== Courtship ===
The male usually initiates courtship, on the ground or in a tree, by bowing several times to the female with drooping wings, at the same time cawing and fanning his tail. The female may respond by crouching down, arching her back and quivering her wings slightly, or she may take the initiative by lowering her head and wings and erecting her partially spread tail over her back. Further similar displays are often followed by begging behaviour by the female and by the male presenting her with food, before coition takes place on the nest. At this stage, nearby male rooks often mob or attack the mating pair, and in the ensuing struggle, any male that finds himself on top of the female will attempt to copulate with her. She terminates these unwanted advances by exiting the nest and perching nearby. A mated pair of rooks will often fondle each other's bills, and this behaviour is also sometimes seen in autumn.

=== Breeding ===
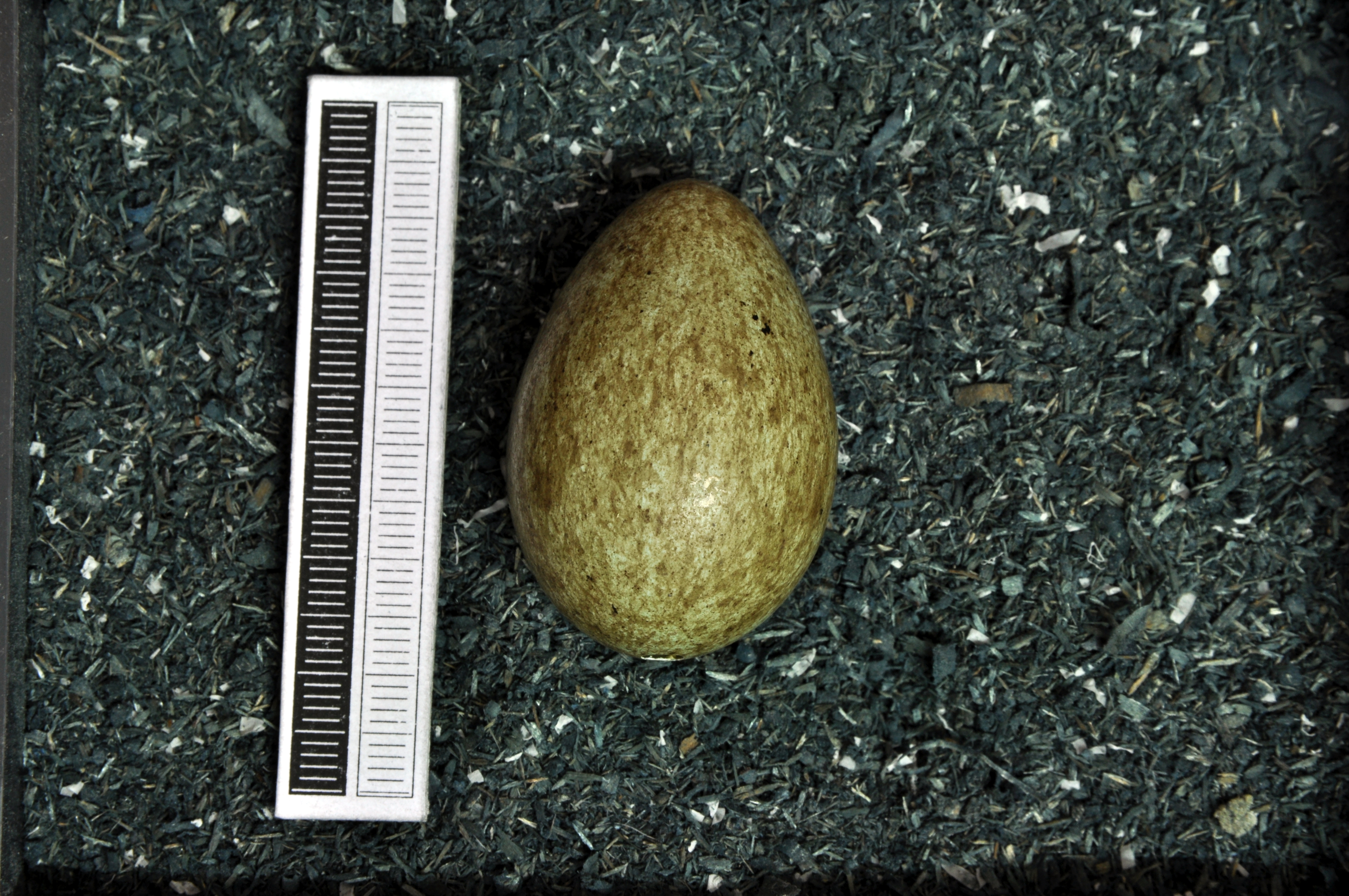
Egg, Collection Museum Wiesbaden Germany

Nesting in a rookery is always colonial, usually in the very tops of large trees, often on the remnants of the previous year's nest. In hilly regions, rooks may nest in smaller trees or bushes, and exceptionally on chimneys or church spires. Both sexes participate in nest-building, with the male finding most of the materials and the female putting them in place. The nest is cup-shaped and composed of sticks, consolidated with earth and lined with grasses, moss, roots, dead leaves and straw. Small branches and twigs are broken off trees, though as many are likely to be stolen from nearby nests as are collected direct, and the lining material is also often taken from other nests.

Eggs are usually three to five in number (sometimes six and occasionally seven) and may be laid by the end of March or early April in Ireland and Britain, but in the harsher conditions of eastern Europe and Russia, it may be early May before the clutch is completed. The background colour is bluish-green to greyish-green but this is almost completely obscured by the heavy blotching of ashy grey and brown. The eggs average 40.0 by 28.3 millimetres (1.57 in × 1.11 in) in size. They are incubated for 16–18 days, almost entirely by the female who is fed by the male. After hatching, the male brings food to the nest while the female broods the young. After ten days, she joins the male in bringing food, which is carried in a throat pouch. The young are fledged by the 32nd or 33rd day but continue to be fed by the parents for some time thereafter. There is normally a single clutch each year, but there are records of birds attempting to breed in the autumn.

In autumn, the young birds of the summer collect into large flocks together with unpaired birds of previous seasons, often in company with jackdaws. It is during this time of year that spectacular aerial displays are performed by the birds. The species is monogamous, with the adults forming long-term pair bonds. Partners often support each other in agonistic encounters and a bird may return to its partner after a quarrel where bill twining, an affiliative behaviour, may take place.

=== Voice ===
The call is usually described as caw or kaah, and is somewhat similar to that of the carrion crow, but less raucous. It is variable in pitch and has several variants, used in different situations. The call is given both in flight and while perched, at which time the bird fans its tail and bows while making each caw. Calls in flight are usually given singly, in contrast to the carrion crow's, which are in groups of three or four. Other sounds are made around the rookery; a high-pitched squawk, a "burring" sound and a semi-chirruping call. Solitary birds occasionally "sing", apparently to themselves, uttering strange clicks, wheezes and human-like notes; the song has been described as a "base or guttural reproduction of the varied and spluttering song" of starlings.

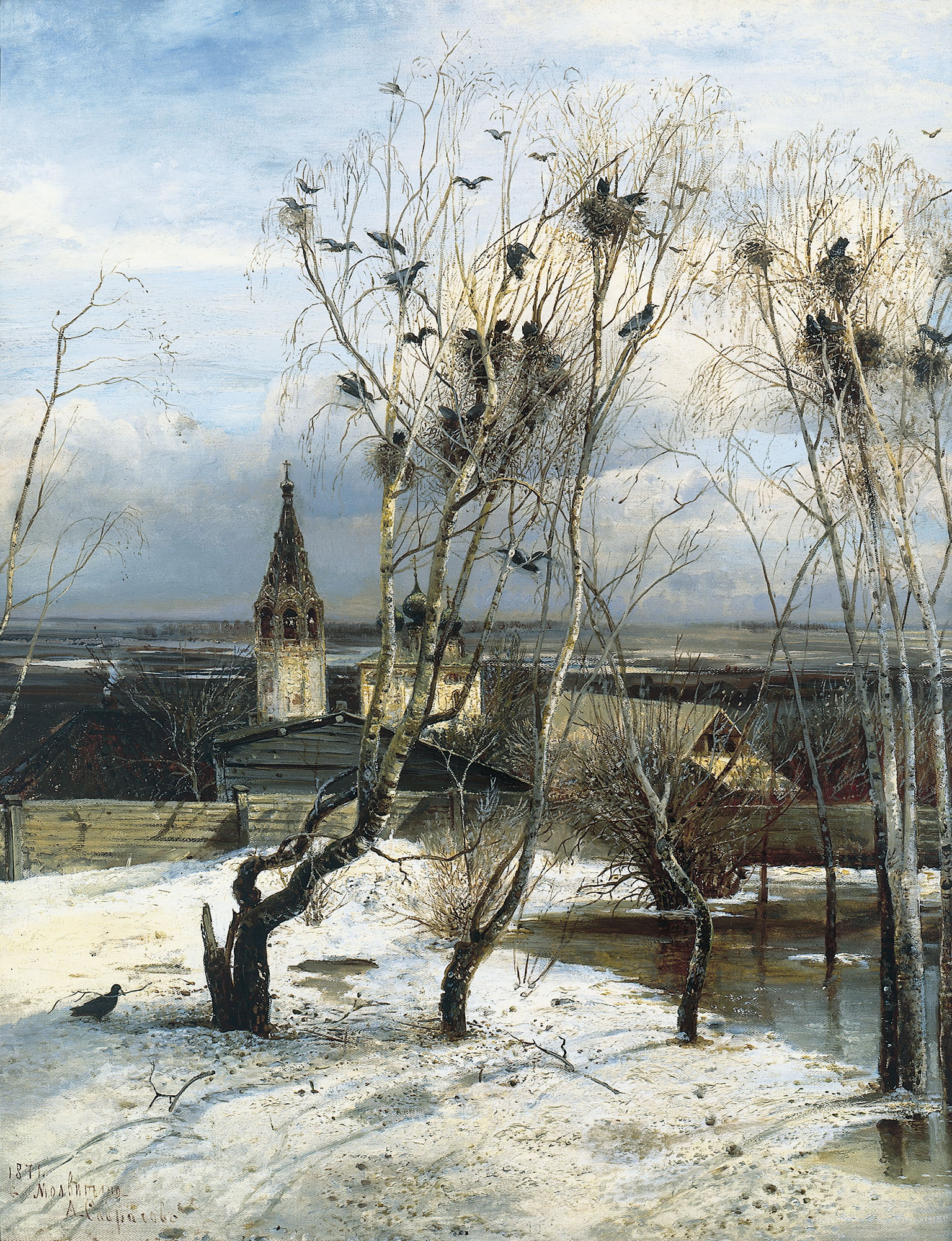
In The Rooks Have Returned (1871) by Alexei Savrasov, the arrival of the rooks is an early portent of the coming spring

=== Intelligence ===
Although wild rooks have not shown tool-use, captive rooks have shown the ability to use and understand puzzles. One of the most commonly tested puzzles is the trap-tube problem. Rooks learned how to pull their reward out of the tube while avoiding a trap on one side.

In captivity, when confronted with problems, rooks have been documented as one of several species of birds capable of using tools as well as modifying tools to meet their needs. Rooks learned that if they push a stone off a ledge into a tube, they will get food. The rooks then discovered they could find and bring a stone and carry it to the tube if no stone was there already. They also used sticks and wire, and figured out how to bend a wire into a hook to reach an item. Rooks also understood the notion of water levels. When given stones and a tube full of water with a reward floating, they not only understood that they needed to use the stones but also the best stone to use.

In one set of experiments, rooks managed to knock a reward off a platform by rolling a stone down a tube toward the base of the platform. Rooks also seemed to understand the idea that a heavier stone will be more likely to knock the platform over. In this same test, rooks showed they understood that they needed to pick a stone of a shape that would roll easily.

Rooks also show the ability to work together to receive a reward. In order to receive a reward, multiple rooks had to pull strings along the lid of a box in order for it to move and them to reach the reward. Rooks seem to have no preference regarding working as a group comparative to working singly.

They also seem to have a notion of gravity, comparable to a six-month-old baby and exceeding the abilities of chimpanzees. Although they do not use tools in the wild, research studies have demonstrated that rooks can do so in cognition tests where tools are required, and can rival, and in some circumstances outperform, chimpanzees.

== Relationship with humans ==
Farmers have observed rooks in their fields and thought of them as vermin. After a series of poor harvests in the early 1500s, Henry VIII introduced a Vermin Act in 1532 "ordeyned to dystroye Choughes [i.e. jackdaws], Crowes and Rokes" to protect grain crops from their predations. This act was only enforced in piecemeal fashion, but Elizabeth I passed the Act for the Preservation of Grayne in 1566 that was taken up with more vigour and large numbers of birds were culled.

Francis Willughby mentions rooks in his Ornithology (1678): "These birds are noisome to corn and grain: so that the husbandmen are forced to employ children, with hooting and crackers, and rattles of metal, and, finally by throwing of stones, to scare them away." He also mentions scarecrows "placed up and down the fields, and dressed up in a country habit, which the birds taking for countrymen dare not come near the grounds where they stand". It was some time before more observant naturalists like John Jenner Weir and Thomas Pennant appreciated that in consuming ground-based pests, the rooks were doing more good than harm.

Rookeries were often perceived as nuisances in rural Britain, and it was previously the practice to hold rook shoots where the juvenile birds, known as "branchers", were shot before they were able to fly. These events were both a social occasion and a source of food (the rook becomes inedible once mature) as rabbit and rook pie was considered a delicacy.

Rooks have a wide distribution and large total population. The main threats they face are from changes in agricultural land use, the application of seed dressings and pesticides, and persecution through shooting. Although total numbers of birds may be declining slightly across the range, this is not at so rapid a rate as to cause concern, and the International Union for Conservation of Nature has assessed its conservation status as being of "least concern".
