= Rookery =

Colony of breeding animals

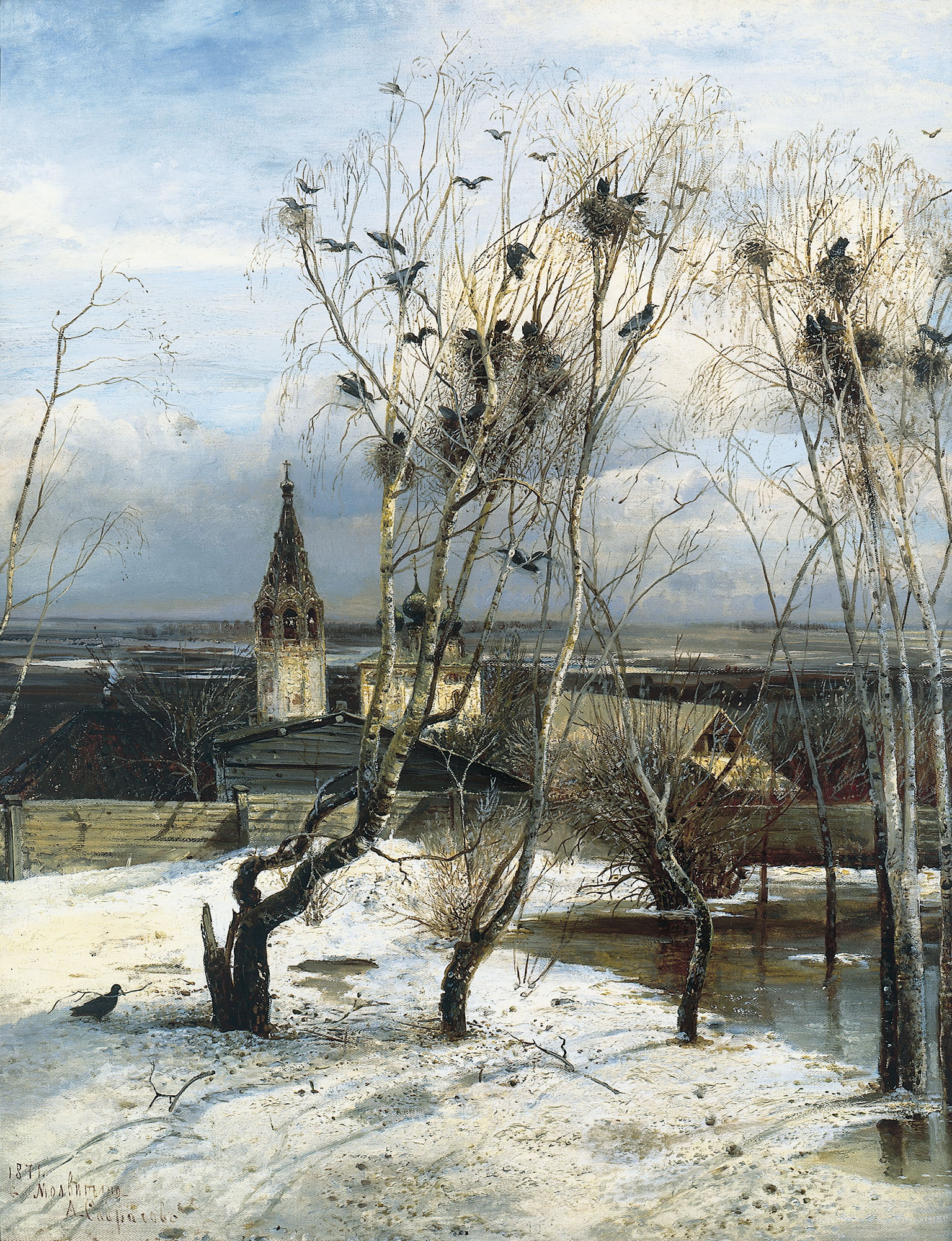
The Rooks Have Come Back Again, Alexei Savrasov, 1871, canvas, oil, The Tretyakov Gallery, Moscow

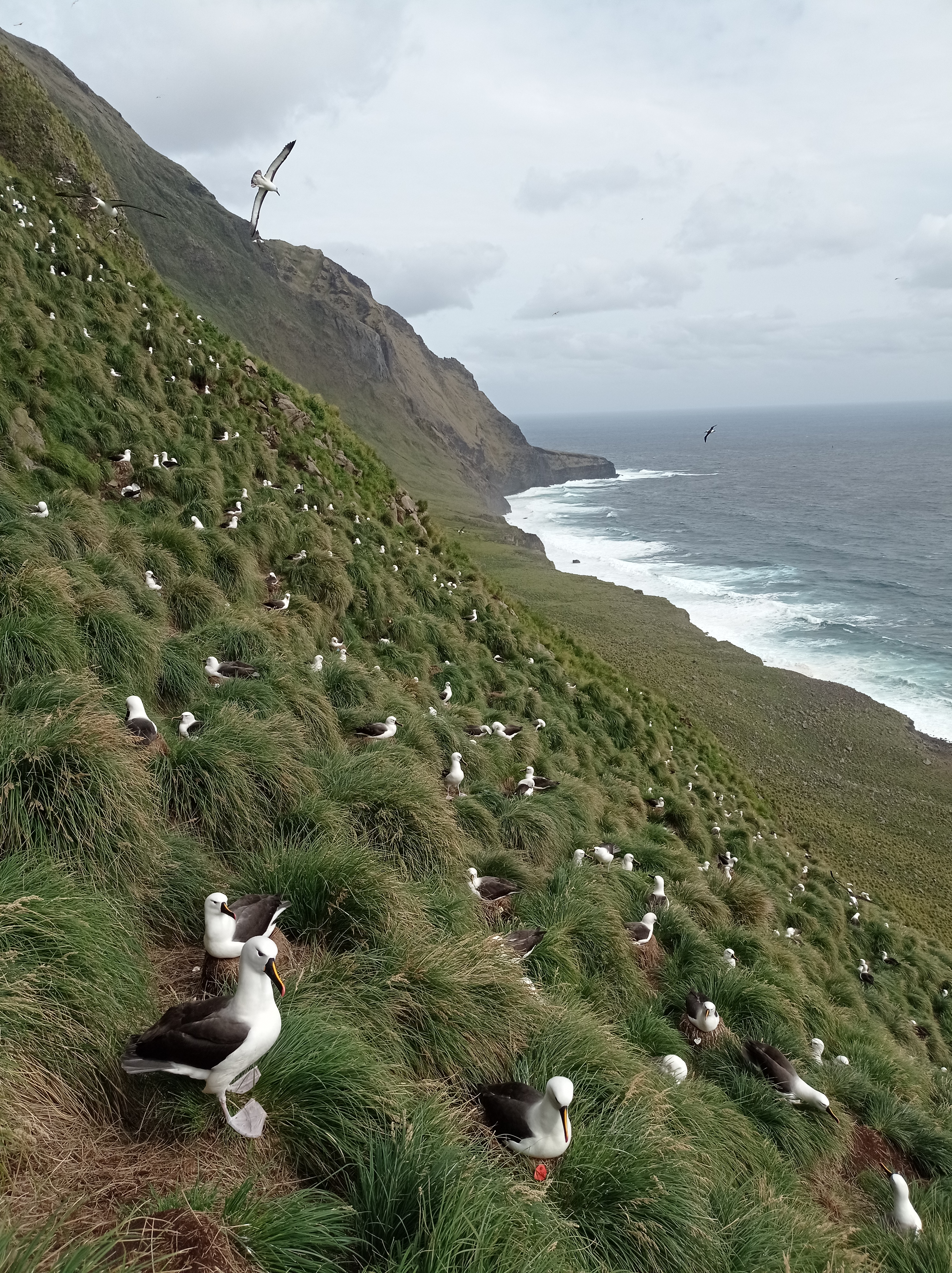
Colonies of Indian yellow-nosed albatrosses on Amsterdam Island

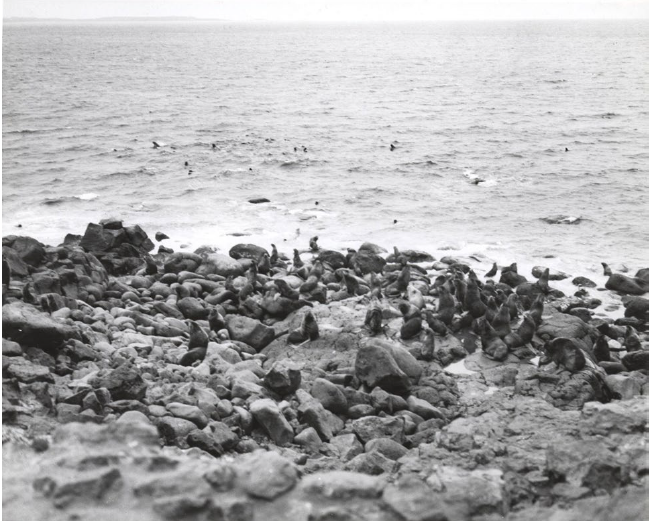
Fur seals in a rookery in the Pribilof Islands in the 1950s

A rookery is a colony of breeding rooks, and more broadly a colony of several types of breeding animals, generally, gregarious birds.

Coming from the nesting habits of rooks, the term is used for corvids and the breeding grounds of colony-forming seabirds, marine mammals (true seals or sea lions), and even some turtles. Rooks (northern-European and central-Asian members of the crow family) have multiple nests in prominent colonies at the tops of trees. Paleontological evidence points to the existence of rookery-like colonies in the pterosaur Pterodaustro.

The term rookery was also borrowed as a name for dense slum housing in nineteenth-century cities, especially in London.

== See also ==
- Auca Mahuevo, for a titanosaurid sauropod dinosaur rookery
- Bird colony
- Heronry
- Rook shooting
