= Auster rookery =

Important Bird Area of Antarctica

Coordinates: 67°23′46″S 63°57′2.5″E

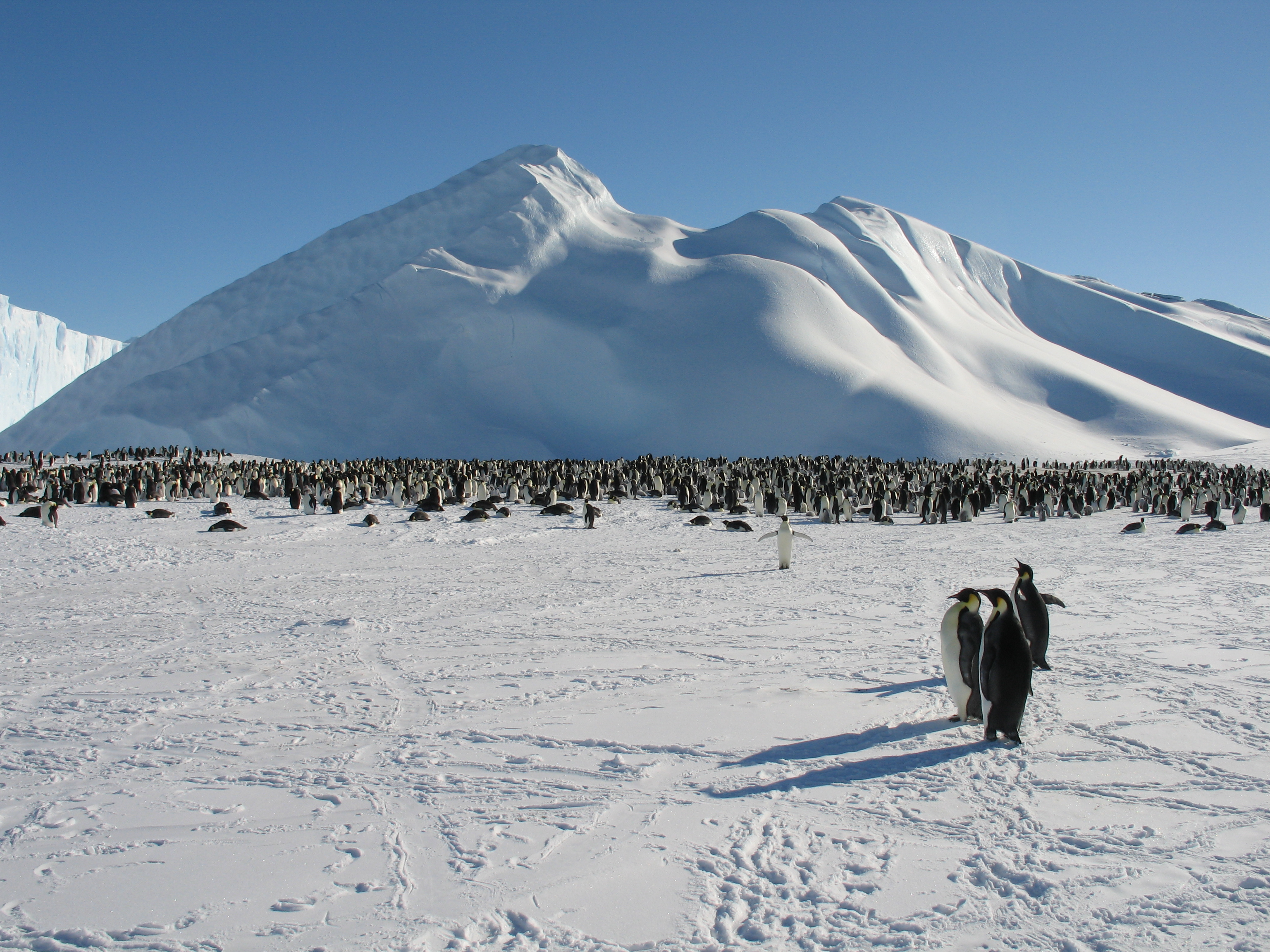
Emperor penguins near grounded icebergs at Auster Rookery, Antarctica

Auster Rookery is an Emperor penguin rookery on sea-ice, sheltered by grounded icebergs, 5 kilometres (2.7 nmi) east of the Auster Islands, and about 51 kilometres (28 nmi) ENE of Mawson Station in Antarctica. It was discovered in August 1957 by Flying Officer D. Johnston, RAAF, from an ANARE Auster aircraft, after which it was named. The rookery was estimated in 2009 to contain 7,855 individual emperor penguins, and has been designated an Important Bird Area by BirdLife International.
