= .255 Jeffery Rook =

Firearm cartridge

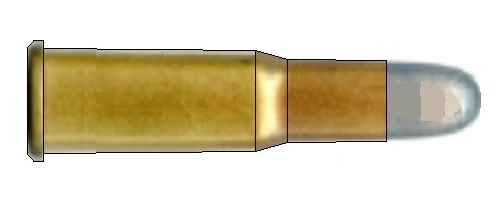
- Type: Rifle
- Place of origin: United Kingdom

Production history
- Designer: W. J. Jeffery & Co.

Specifications
- Case type: Rimmed, bottleneck
- Bullet diameter: .255 in (6.5 mm)
- Shoulder diameter: .274 in (7.0 mm)
- Base diameter: .344 in (8.7 mm)
- Rim diameter: .401 in (10.2 mm)
- Case length: 1.15 in (29 mm)
- Overall length: 1.43 in (36 mm)

Ballistic performance
Bullet mass/type	Velocity	Energy
65 gr (4 g)	1,200 ft/s (370 m/s)	208 ft⋅lbf (282 J)
- Source: Cartridges of the World.

The .255 Jeffery Rook / 6.5x29mmR, also known as the .255 Jeffery Rook Rifle, is an obsolete small bore intermediate firearm cartridge.

== Overview ==
The .255 Jeffery Rook is a rimmed centerfire cartridge. It was loaded with both black powder and smokeless powders, usually with a 65 gr (4.2 g) lead solid or hollowpoint bullet at a standard muzzle velocity of 1,200 ft/s (370 m/s).

The .255 Jeffery Rook was developed by W. J. Jeffery & Co. and originally designed for use in rook rifles for hunting small game and target shooting. It gained an excellent reputation for accuracy and was widely used for target shooting before being superseded by the .22 Long Rifle as a miniature target round, and it was also chambered in some single-shot pistols.

Major Percy Powell-Cotton carried a W. J. Jeffery & Co. rook rifle chambered in .255 Jeffery Rook on a number of his expeditions stating it "is often better than the shot-gun for collecting specimens and providing for the pot."

== Dimensions ==
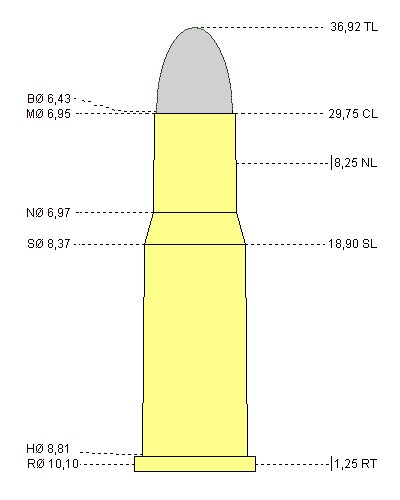

== See also ==
- Rook rifle
- List of rifle cartridges
- List of rimmed cartridges
- 6 mm rifle cartridges
