= Cape Daly =

Promontory on the coast of Antarctica

Cape Daly (67°31′S 63°47′E) is an ice-covered promontory on the coast of Antarctica, 3 nautical miles (6 km) west of Safety Island and close southeast of the Robinson Group. It was discovered in February 1931 by the British Australian New Zealand Antarctic Research Expedition under Mawson, who named it for Senator Daly of the Australian Senate.
