= Taylor knock-out factor =

Formula made to approximate a bullet's stopping power

The Taylor knock-out factor, also called Taylor KO factor or TKOF, is a formulaic mathematical approach for evaluating the stopping power of hunting cartridges, developed by John "Pondoro" Taylor in the middle of the 20th century. Taylor, an elephant hunter and author who wrote two books about rifles and cartridges for African hunting, devised the formula as a means of comparing the ability of a cartridge to deliver a knock out blow to an elephant from a shot to the head when the brain is missed.

== Formula ==
The Taylor KO factor multiplies bullet mass (measured in grains) by muzzle velocity (measured in feet per second) by bullet diameter (measured in inches) and then divides the product by 7,000, converting the value from grains to pounds and giving a numerical value from 0 to ~150 for normal hunting cartridges. It is proportional to the momentum at the muzzle times the diameter of the bullet. Expressed as a fraction, the Taylor KO Factor is:

$$\mathrm{TKOF}=\frac{Mass \times Velocity \times Diameter}{7000}$$

=== Example calculation ===
Using the standard 7.62×51mm NATO cartridge, the cartridge's characteristics are:

- Bullet mass = 9.5 grams $\Rightarrow$ 147 grains
- Muzzle velocity = 833 meters per second $\Rightarrow$ 2733 feet per second
- Bullet diameter = 7.82 millimetres $\Rightarrow$ .308 inches

The calculation is:

$$\mathrm{TKOF}=\frac{147 \times 2733 \times .308}{7000}=\mathrm{17.7}$$

Therefore the Taylor KO factor for the 7.62×51mm NATO cartridge is 17.7.

For metric values the calculation is

$\mathrm{TKOF}=\frac{Mass \times Velocity \times Diameter}{3505,55}$

7.62×51mm NATO in metric :

$\mathrm{TKOF}=\frac{9.5 \times 833 \times 7.82}{3505.55}=\mathrm{17.7}$ (note that 7.62 mm is the land diameter of the caliber, however the actual bullet diam is 7.82 mm)

Note: The product of mass and velocity is a quantity called, in modern physics, "momentum". Conservation of momentum is a characteristic of non-deformable collisions. A bullet, hitting hard bone, would transfer most of the impulse to that bone mass.

== History ==
John "Pondoro" Taylor, an ivory hunter who over his career shot over 1,000 elephants along with a variety of other African game and who is renowned for writing two books about rifles and cartridges for African hunting, devised the Taylor KO factor to place a mathematical value on the concussive effects a cartridge and bullet would have on an elephant, specifically from a shot to the head when the brain is missed, a "knock out" meaning the elephant was sufficiently stunned by the hit that it would not immediately turn on the hunter or flee.

First describing the Taylor KO Factor as "knock out value" or "strike energy" in his African rifles and cartridges, Taylor wrote that muzzle energy is "surely the most misleading thing in the world", that it is too dependent on muzzle velocity instead of bullet weight and that it is "quite useless if you are trying to compare any two rifles from the point of view of the actual punch inflicted by the bullet" which according to him is more affected by the bullet's weight. In African rifles and cartridges Taylor compares the effect of a near miss of an elephant's brain from a frontal head shot with the .416 Rigby and the .470 Nitro Express, two cartridges with similar muzzle energy but different bullet weights. Taylor states that the .416 Rigby will probably not knock the elephant out, but momentarily stun the animal which will recover quickly if not dispatched immediately, while the same shot delivered by the .470 Nitro Express will render the elephant unconscious for up to five minutes. Further, Taylor writes that the .577 Nitro Express will knock an elephant unconscious for around 20 minutes, the .600 Nitro Express around half an hour.

The Taylor KO factor conforms to the observations and experiences of Taylor who, along with other very successful elephant hunters such as Deaf Banks, Pete Pearson and Jim Sutherland, preferred large heavy bore rifles for elephant hunting in close country.

== Criticism ==
Whilst most acknowledge the originality of the formula and Taylor's broad big-game hunting experience with a wide variety of cartridges, the Taylor KO factor is source of some debate amongst modern gun writers, some describing it as peculiar, antiquated, inaccurate and an unfounded theory, others stating it is a useful tool but stressing that should not be used in isolation when choosing a big-game hunting cartridge, whilst others still say their experiences tend to support the formula.

Specific criticisms of the Taylor KO Factor include the emphasis placed on bullet diameter over factors such as sectional density and bullet expansion and the formula’s failure to account for modern bullet design. These factors, along with Taylor’s dismissal of muzzle energy, allow many obsolete low powered large bore cartridges such as the .577/450 Martini-Henry and the .45-70 Government to have as much as twice the TKOF than the smaller bore general purpose hunting cartridges such as the .303 British and the .30-06 Springfield. For these reasons the Taylor KO factor is seen as poor measure of stopping power for cartridges used on deer sized game and smaller, it is also seen as a poor measure of the performance of handgun cartridges.

Taylor himself acknowledged this, stating "in the case of soft-skinned non-dangerous game, such as is generally shot at medium to long ranges, theoretical mathematical energy may possibly prove a more reliable guide" and that his formula was designed to measure a cartridge's performance against the large, thick skinned, big boned elephant.

== TKOF comparison ==
Below is a table including a number of African dangerous game hunting cartridges including their bullet mass, muzzle velocity, bullet diameter and Taylor KO factor, discussed in African rifles and cartridges.

| TKOF | Name | Mass | | Velocity | | Diameter | |
| TKOF | Name | gr | g | ft/s | m/s | in | mm |
|---|---|---|---|---|---|---|---|
| 1.5 | .22 Long Rifle † | 40 | 2.6 | 1,200 | 370 | .223 | 5.7 |
| 5.6 | 5.56×45mm NATO † ‡ | 62 | 4.0 | 2,830 | 860 | .224 | 5.7 |
| 16.0 | .277 Fury † ‡ | 135 | 8.7 | 3,000 | 910 | .278 | 7.1 |
| 17.9 | 7.62×51mm NATO † ‡ | 147 | 9.5 | 2,733 | 833 | .308 | 7.8 |
| 28.3 | .318 Westley Richards | 250 | 16.2 | 2,400 | 730 | .330 | 8.4 |
| 31.4 | .333 Jeffery | 300 | 19.4 | 2,200 | 670 | .333 | 8.5 |
| 30.4 | .338 Winchester Magnum ‡ | 225 | 14.6 | 2,800 | 850 | .338 | 8.6 |
| 30.2 | .350 Rigby | 225 | 14.6 | 2,625 | 800 | .358 | 9.1 |
| 34.6 | .375 H&H Magnum | 235 | 15.2 | 2,750 | 840 | .375 | 9.5 |
| 35.3 | 9.3×62mm Mauser | 286 | 18.5 | 2,362 | 720 | .366 | 9.3 |
| 38.8 | .375 H&H Magnum | 300 | 19.4 | 2,400 | 730 | .375 | 9.5 |
| 49.2 | .400 Jeffery Nitro Express | 400 | 25.9 | 2,100 | 640 | .410 | 10.4 |
| 49.8 | .450/400 Nitro Express | 400 | 25.9 | 2,150 | 660 | .405 | 10.3 |
| 51.4 | .404 Jeffery | 400 | 25.9 | 2,125 | 648 | .423 | 10.7 |
| 57.1 | .416 Rigby | 400 | 25.9 | 2,400 | 730 | .416 | 10.6 |
| 59.9 | .425 Westley Richards | 410 | 26.6 | 2,350 | 720 | .435 | 11.0 |
| 67.5 | .450 Nitro Express | 480 | 31.1 | 2,150 | 660 | .458 | 11.6 |
| 69.3 | .450 No 2 Nitro Express | 480 | 31.1 | 2,175 | 663 | .458 | 11.6 |
| 74.7 | .450 Rigby ‡ | 480 | 31.1 | 2,378 | 725 | .458 | 11.6 |
| 70.3 | .458 Winchester Magnum ‡ | 500 | 32.4 | 2,150 | 660 | .458 | 11.6 |
| 76.2 | .465 H&H Magnum ‡ | 480 | 31.1 | 2,375 | 724 | .468 | 11.9 |
| 69.0 | .500/465 Nitro Express | 480 | 31.1 | 2,150 | 660 | .468 | 11.9 |
| 72.9 | .470 Nitro Express | 500 | 32.4 | 2,150 | 660 | .475 | 12.1 |
| 89.3 | .500 Nitro Express | 570 | 36.9 | 2,150 | 660 | .510 | 13.0 |
| 90.9 | .505 Gibbs | 600 | 38.9 | 2,100 | 640 | .505 | 12.8 |
| 128.3 | .577 Nitro Express | 750 | 48.6 | 2,050 | 620 | .584 | 14.8 |
| 147.5 | .600 Nitro Express | 900 | 58.3 | 1,850 | 560 | .620 | 15.7 |
| 200.0 | .700 Nitro Express ‡ | 1,000 | 64.8 | 2,000 | 610 | .700 | 17.8 |

† Included as a comparison
‡ Developed after Taylor's writings

== See also ==
- Big five game
