= Gun law in India =

The primary Indian law on firearm possession is the Arms Act, 1959, and rules issued under it. The law requires a licence to acquire, possess, or carry any firearm or ammunition. Licencing is discretionary rather than automatic: a licencing authority may refuse to grant a licence if it considers the applicant unfit, or where refusal is necessary for public safety. The Small Arms Survey estimated 71.1 million civilian-held firearms in India in 2017, second only to the United States, estimated at 393 million. The estimated number of issued gun licenses in India is 3.3 to 4 million. The Statutory structure for firearm possession is based directly on the colonial-era legislation enacted after the rebellion of 1857. With approximately five civilian firearms per 100 people, India is the 120th most civilly armed country in the world.

== History ==
Prior to the Indian Rebellion of 1857, there were few gun control laws in South Asia, including in British India.

The first comprehensive arms law in India was the Arms and Ammunition Act in 1857, enacted on 11 September 1857 while the rebellion was still in progress; It regulated the import, manufacture, sale, possession, and use of arms as a temporary measure for two years. It was replaced in 1860. The 1860 Act provided for the disarming of any state, district or place, made possession of arms and ammunition in a disarmed area unlawful without a licence, and prohibited the purchase of arms from unlicensed persons. These provisions were consolidated and extended by the Indian Arms Act 1878 by the British colonial government, which imposed stricter controls on the importation, transport, and possession of arms and ammunition; the definition of "arms" under the Act extended to "swords, daggers, spears, spear-heads, bows and arrows". The Act included the mandatory requirement of licenses to carry firearms, but contained exclusions for a number of ethnic groups, including Europeans, Anglo-Indians, and the Kodava people.

The 1931 Karachi Resolution, drafted by Mahatma Gandhi, admitted the right to bear arms as a fundamental right, though the constituent assembly ultimately rejected it. There was also a level of debate over admitting the right to bear arms into the Constitution of India during its drafting. In a 1918 recruitment leaflet written by Gandhi during World War I, he voiced his disapproval of the Indian Arms Act, 1878:

“Among the many misdeeds of the British rule in India, history will look upon the Act depriving a whole nation of arms as the blackest. If we want the Arms Act to be repealed, if we want to learn the use of arms, here is a golden opportunity. If the middle classes render voluntary help to Government in the hour of its trial, distrust will disappear, and the ban on possessing arms will be withdrawn.”

== Specific restrictions ==
In 1907, amid the rising Indian independence movement, the colonial government banned the possession of rifles chambered in calibres which corresponded to British military centerfire cartridges (e. g., .303, .450, and .577). This led to the replacement of the .303 with 8×50mmR Mannlicher, locally known as .315 Indian, demise of .375/303 hunting cartridge, which had to be replaced with .318, as well as to a rush by British rifle and ammunition makers to develop substitutes for now-banned popular big-game hunting rounds (Holland & Holland created the .465, Joseph Lang the .470, an unidentified firm the .475 Nitro Express, Eley Brothers the .475 No 2 Nitro Express and Westley Richards the .476, with the .470 NE becoming the most popular). .400 also gained some usage.

== Current law ==
Indian law divides firearm licenses into two types:

- Prohibited Bore (PB) includes every type of ammo (caliber/bore) used by Special Forces, Police, Army, etc. continuously in service.
- Non-Prohibited Bore (NPB) includes every other type of Ammo (caliber/bore) that was that not used by Special Forces, Police, Army, etc. continuously (even old PB bore that is no longer in use by Special Forces, Police, Army, etc.)

In 2016, after the release of the Arms Rules, 2016, the Ministry of Home Affairs instructed all State Governments to further cast an overviewing role over all types of firearms. In addition to designating air guns as firearms, it directed the State Government to further direct all District Magistrates (DC/DM) of their States to enforce Standard Operating Procedures (SOPs). The SOPs required all air gun owners to test their firearms and furnish details of purchase. It also instructed all DCs to delegate each of their Sub-Divisional Commissioners (SDC/SDO/SDM) in charge of the Arms Branch to coordinate and conduct tests of air guns. It was stipulated that an Armorer be requisitioned by the District Magistrate from the Superintendent of Police (SP) to assist in the testing. It stipulated that tested and verified license-free air guns be given an Arms License Not Required (ALNR) certificate after testing using a chronometer, after which jurisdiction-specific identification marks be stamped on the firearms. As such, in May 2023, the Government of Mizoram released an Office Memorandum stating that ALNR certificates were under the direct purview of the DM without the need for further administrative approval while Arms License Required (ALR) applications be sent to the Home Department for further administrative approval. The memorandum also reiterated the 2016 Ministry of Home Affairs instructions.

Such SOPs were aimed at further ensuring a strict divide between 'license required' and 'license not required' firearms in the country.

=== Non-Prohibited Bore Licenses ===
The law states that a license can be issued to anyone who has a good reason without stipulating what constitutes a good reason. Typically, applicants wanting a license for self-defense purposes need to prove danger to their life. Article 14 states that authorities can deny a license for unspecified "public peace or for public safety" reasons. They are not obligated to give reason for refusal of an application if they deem it to be necessary. Firearm licenses must be renewed every five years. Approximately 50% of the applications for license are accepted. For example, of the 12.8 million inhabitants, between April 2015 and March 2016, authorities in Mumbai rejected 169 out of 342 firearm applications.

Some local jurisdictions may have additional requirements for granting licenses. For example, in 2019 the commissioner of Firozpur district in Punjab ordered that every license applicant must plant at least 10 trees and take photos with them.

=== Air guns ===
Guns of caliber .177 are usually within the legal muzzle energy for air guns in India. Owning an air gun does not require a license. However air gun use causing serious physical harm or death is punished the same way as with higher caliber guns. As per the ISSF rules, sport shooters must hold a minimum permit by an authorized shooter training club or institute and the state rifle association and later by the NRAI. Sports shooters without permits from a club and the NRAI carrying air guns are subject to imprisonment.

== Judicial treatment ==
After independence, the Arms Act, 1959 was enacted; it has been amended several times since, most recently in 2019. Allahabad High Court, commenting on the same in 1993, noted that the avowed object of the 1959 Act: "is to do away with the British policy of keeping the Indian nation disarmed; we must give an interpretation to the provisions of the said Act which is in conformity with the above object. However, the unfortunate fact is that the authorities often interpret the 1959 Act as if it is not materially different from the 1878 Act, and hence applications for arm licences are as readily and arbitrarily rejected as before." Justice Markandey Katju stated:

"In my opinion, the right to carry non-prohibited firearms is part of Article 21 of the Constitution, for to hold otherwise would amount to keeping good and peace-loving citizens defenceless while the criminals are well armed. This would be wholly arbitrary and unreasonable. In these days when law and order has broken down, it is only an armed man who can lead a life of dignity and self-respect. No criminal or gangster can dare to assault or threaten such a person for fear of retaliation. Since the word life in Article 21 has been held by the Supreme Court to mean a life of dignity, the right to carry non-prohibited fire arms must be deemed to be included in Article 21."

== Carrying firearms ==
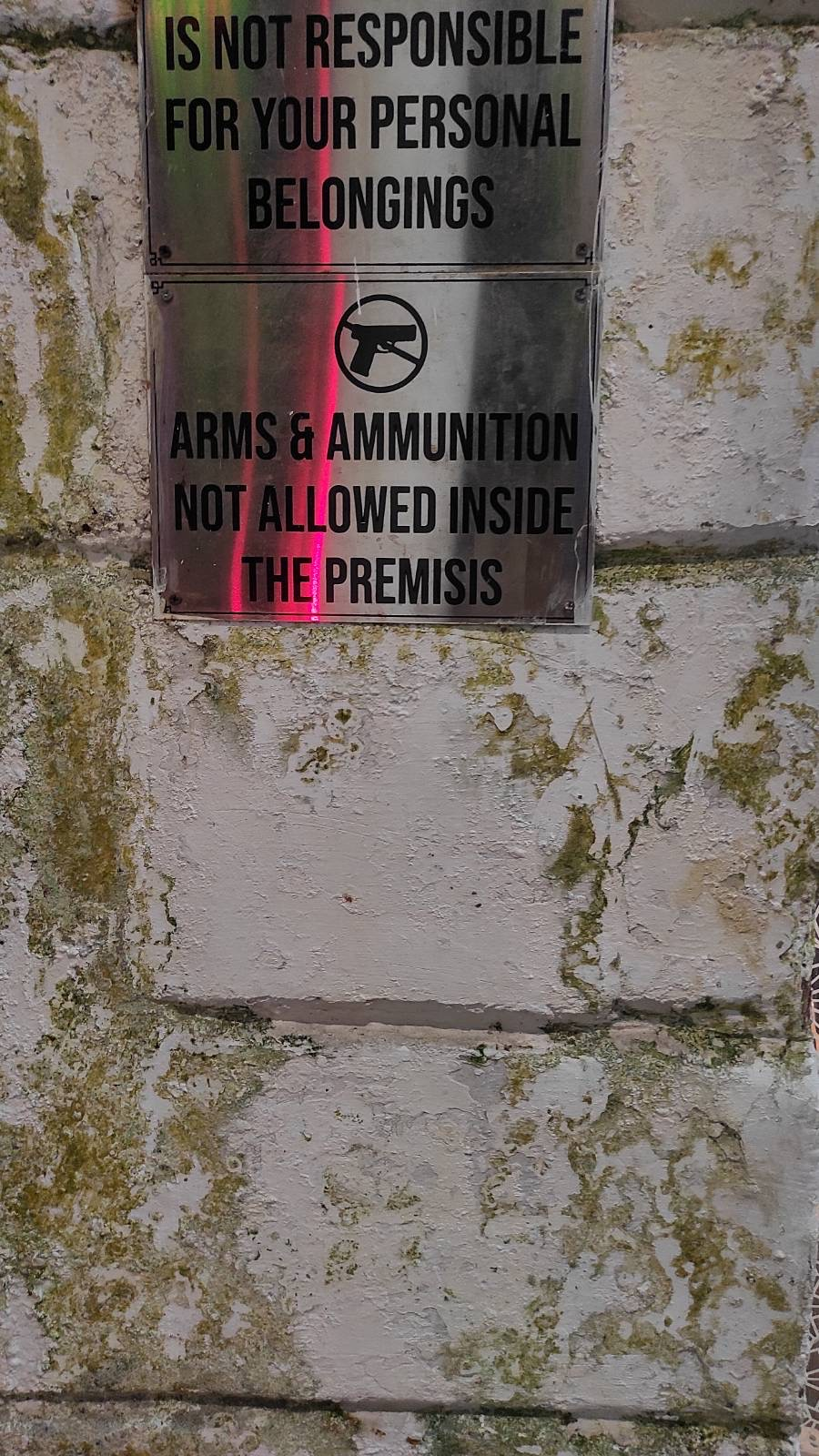
"No Arms & Ammunition" sign found outside a restaurant in Chennai, India

Open carry of firearms is allowed in India, subject to various conditions. According to Arms Rules, 2016, no person shall carry a firearm in a public place unless the firearm is carried in a holder designed, manufactured or adapted for the carrying of a firearm. A firearm contemplated in this rule must be completely covered and the person carrying the firearm must be able to exercise effective control over such firearm. Brandishing, discharging and blank-firing of firearms in public places and firearm free zones is strictly prohibited.

Violation of this rule can lead to revocation of the license and seizure of the firearm in addition to the penalty specified under the Arms Act 1959.

=== Legally available guns (NPB) ===
Name	Price (IN₹)
0.32" Revolver MK-III	84,000
0.32" Revolver MK-III (Light Weight) NIRBHEEK	110,880
0.22" Sporting Rifle	71,500
0.315" Sporting Rifle	81,400
0.22" Revolver	50,600
12 Bore Pump Action Shotgun (Nylon Butt)	86,350
0.32" Revolver (Long Barrel) ANMOL	95,920
0.32" Revolver (MK-IV)	89,100
Modified 0.32" Pistol	77,000
0.32" Pistol (Ashani MK-II)	104,500
0.30-06" Sporting Rifle	159,500
0.22" Revolver NIDAR	49,500
12 Bore Pump Action Shotgun (Side Fold)	88,000
12 Bore Pump Action Shotgun (Fixed Butt)	86,350
0.32" Pistol	86,310
0.32" Revolver NISHANK	79,750

== Firearm possession ==
As of 2016, there are 3,369,444 firearm licenses active in India with 9,700,000 firearms registered to them. According to Small Arms Survey, there are 61,401,000 illegal firearms in India.

The following is a breakdown of firearm licenses by state:

State	Active firearm licenses
Uttar Pradesh	1,277,914
Jammu and Kashmir	369,191
Punjab	359,249
Madhya Pradesh	247,130
Haryana	141,926
Rajasthan	133,968
Karnataka	113,631
Maharashtra	84,050
Bihar	82,585
Himachal Pradesh	77,069
Uttarakhand	64,770
Gujarat	60,784
West Bengal	60,525
Delhi	38,754
Nagaland	36,606
Arunachal Pradesh	34,394
Manipur	26,836
Tamil Nadu	22,532
Odisha	20,588
Assam	19,283
Meghalaya	18,688
Jharkhand	17,654
Mizoram	15,895
Kerala	9,459
Dadra and Nagar Haveli	125
Daman and Diu	125

== Gun crime ==
Gun homicides in India by legal and illegal guns

There are around 3.22 gun homicides per 100,000 people in India every year. Around 90% of them are committed using illegal guns.

== See also ==
- Overview of gun laws by nation
