= .476 Nitro Express =

Rifle cartridge

- Type: Rifle
- Place of origin: United Kingdom

Production history
- Designer: Westley Richards
- Designed: 1907
- Produced: 1907

Specifications
- Parent case: .500 Nitro Express 3"
- Case type: Rimmed, bottleneck
- Bullet diameter: .476 in (12.1 mm)
- Neck diameter: .508 in (12.9 mm)
- Shoulder diameter: .530 in (13.5 mm)
- Base diameter: .570 in (14.5 mm)
- Rim diameter: .643 in (16.3 mm)
- Case length: 3.00 in (76 mm)
- Overall length: 3.77 in (96 mm)
- Primer type: Berdan 0.254 inch

Ballistic performance
Bullet mass/type	Velocity	Energy
520 gr (34 g)	2,100 ft/s (640 m/s)	5,085 ft⋅lbf (6,894 J)
- Test barrel length: 28 inches Sources: Barnes & Amber

The .476 Nitro Express, also known as the .476 Westley Richards, is a British rifle cartridge introduced by Westley Richards around 1907.

== Development ==
The .476 Nitro Express is one of several rounds (including the .500/465 Nitro Express, .470 Nitro Express, .475 Nitro Express, and .475 No. 2 Nitro Express) developed as a replacement for the .450 Nitro Express following the British Army 1907 ban of .450 caliber ammunition in India and the Sudan, all with comparable performance.

Westley Richards created the .476 Nitro Express by necking down the .500 Nitro Express 3".

== Use ==
Available in single-shot and double rifles, it was less popular than the above-mentioned rounds. It is nearly identical in performance to a number of others in the same class.

The .476 is considered adequate for all African and Indian big game, including elephant and rhinoceros. Its ballistics resemble the .458 Winchester Magnum, with a larger diameter bullet; whether this is an advantage remains in dispute.

Commercial rifles are no longer available in .476 Nitro Express except by special order, ammunition is no longer commercially available, and handloading data are scant, the factory load used 75 gr (4.86 g) of cordite under a 520 gr (33.7 g) slug.

== See also ==
- List of rifle cartridges
- 12 mm caliber
- Nitro Express
