= .400/360 Nitro Express =

Centerfire rifle cartridge

.400/360 Westley Richards
- Type: Rifle
- Place of origin: United Kingdom

Production history
- Designer: Westley Richards
- Designed: 1900

Specifications
- Case type: Rimmed, bottlenecked
- Bullet diameter: .358 in (9.1 mm)
- Neck diameter: .375 in (9.5 mm)
- Shoulder diameter: .437 in (11.1 mm)
- Base diameter: .470 in (11.9 mm)
- Rim diameter: .590 in (15.0 mm)
- Case length: 2.75 in (70 mm)
- Overall length: 3.59 in (91 mm)

Ballistic performance
Bullet mass/type	Velocity	Energy
314 gr (20 g) SP	1,900 ft/s (580 m/s)	2,520 ft⋅lbf (3,420 J)
- Test barrel length: 28; Sources: Cartridges of the World & Kynoch.

.400/360 Purdey

Production history
- Designer: James Purdey & Sons
- Designed: 1900

Specifications
- Case type: Rimmed, bottlenecked
- Bullet diameter: .367 in (9.3 mm)
- Neck diameter: .389 in (9.9 mm)
- Shoulder diameter: .417 in (10.6 mm)
- Base diameter: .470 in (11.9 mm)
- Rim diameter: .520 in (13.2 mm)
- Case length: 2.75 in (70 mm)
- Overall length: 3.59 in (91 mm)

Ballistic performance
Bullet mass/type	Velocity	Energy
300 gr (19 g) SP	1,950 ft/s (590 m/s)	2,537 ft⋅lbf (3,440 J)
- Test barrel length: 28; Sources: Cartridges of the World & Kynoch.

9x70mm Mauser

Production history
- Designer: Mauser
- Designed: 1900

Specifications
- Parent case: .400/360 Westley Richards

Ballistic performance
Bullet mass/type	Velocity	Energy
217 gr (14 g) SP	2,477 ft/s (755 m/s)	2,970 ft⋅lbf (4,030 J)
- Source: Cartridges of the World.

The .400/360 Nitro Express (2 3/4-inch) cartridges are a number of very similar, but not interchangeable, centerfire rifle cartridges developed by James Purdey & Sons, William Evans, Westley Richards and Fraser of Edinburgh, all at the beginning of the 20th century.

== Design ==
The .400/360 Nitro Express cartridges are all rimmed, bottlenecked cartridges designed for use in single shot and double rifles. Whilst almost identical in appearance there were slight variations in both the cartridge dimensions, bullet weights and, with the Purdey cartridge, calibre.

As is common with cartridges for double rifles, due to the need to regulate the two barrels to the same point of aim, each .400/360 Nitro Express cartridge was offered in only one loading.

=== .400/360 Evans ===
The .400/360 Evans fires a .358 in (9.1 mm) calibre, 300 gr (19 g) bullet at a velocity of 1,950 ft/s (590 m/s).

=== .400/360 Fraser ===
The .400/360 Fraser fires a .358 in (9.1 mm) calibre, 289 gr (18.7 g) bullet.

=== .400/360 Purdey ===
The .400/360 Purdey fires a .367 in (9.3 mm) calibre, 300 gr (19 g) bullet at a velocity of 1,950 ft/s (590 m/s). These cartridges were usually marked .400/.360P or .400/.360B.

=== .400/360 Westley Richards ===
The .400/360 Westley Richards fires a .358 in (9.1 mm) calibre, 314 gr (20.3 g) bullet at a velocity of 1,900 ft/s (580 m/s). Westley Richards also produced a rimless version of this cartridge, also firing a 314 gr bullet.

=== 9x70mm Mauser ===
The 9×70mm Mauser is a German version of the Westley Richards cartridge which fires a lighter .358 in (9.1 mm) calibre, 217 gr (14.1 g) bullet at a faster velocity of 2,477 ft/s (755 m/s). The 9×70mm Mauser can be fired through rifles designed for the .400/360 Westley Richards, although this is rarely satisfactory as these rifles are usually regulated for a different loading.

== History ==
All versions of .400/360 Nitro Express cartridges appeared at the beginning of the 20th century and were initially very popular for use in Africa and India.

The .400/360 Nitro Express cartridges gradually declined in popularity with the increased popularity of the magnum-lengthed Gewehr 98 bolt-action rifles, being supplanted by such cartridges as the .350 Rigby and the .375 H&H Magnum, whilst in European rifles, the 9×70mm Mauser was superseded by the 9.3×74mmR.

The .400/360 Purdey and the .400/360 Westley Richards cartridges can still be sourced today by manufacturers such as Kynoch.

== Use ==
All versions of the .400/360 Nitro Express are suitable for use for hunting medium-sized game.

In his African Rifles and Cartridges, John "Pondoro" Taylor wrote that the .400/360 Nitro Express cartridges "all killed game, but failed to satisfy."

== See also ==
- Nitro Express
- List of rifle cartridges
- 9 mm rifle cartridges
