= .369 Nitro Express =

Rifle cartridge

- Type: Rifle
- Place of origin: United Kingdom

Production history
- Designer: James Purdey & Sons
- Designed: 1922
- Produced: 1922

Specifications
- Case type: Rimmed, bottleneck
- Bullet diameter: .375 in (9.5 mm)
- Neck diameter: .398 in (10.1 mm)
- Shoulder diameter: .475 in (12.1 mm)
- Base diameter: .543 in (13.8 mm)
- Rim diameter: .616 in (15.6 mm)
- Case length: 2.69 in (68 mm)
- Overall length: 3.6 in (91 mm)
- Case capacity: 102.3 gr H_{2}O (6.63 cm^{3})

Ballistic performance
Bullet mass/type	Velocity	Energy
270 gr (17 g)	2,525 ft/s (770 m/s)	3,815 ft⋅lbf (5,172 J)
- Test barrel length: 31 in Sources: Kynoch & Cartridges of the World.

The .369 Nitro Express, also known as the .369 Purdey Nitro Express, is a centerfire, rifle cartridge developed by James Purdey & Sons and introduced in 1922.

== Overview ==
The .369 Nitro Express is a rimmed cartridge originally designed for use in Purdey's own double rifles. The cartridge offers almost identical ballistic performance to the .375 H&H Flanged Magnum, firing a projectile of the same .375 in (9.5 mm) caliber.

As is common with cartridges for double rifles, due to the need to regulate the two barrels to the same point of aim, the .369 Nitro Express was offered in one loading, firing a 270 gr (17 g) projectile at 2,525 ft/s (770 m/s).

In his African Rifles and Cartridges, John "Pondoro" Taylor said of the .369 Nitro Express that you "would need to go a very long way to get a better general purpose weapon".

== See also ==
- List of rifle cartridges
- 9 mm rifle cartridges
- Nitro Express
