= .375/303 Westley Richards Accelerated Express =

Rifle cartridge

.375/303 WR Accelerated Express
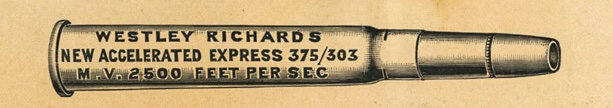
- Type: Rifle
- Place of origin: England

Production history
- Designer: Westley Richards
- Designed: 1905
- Produced: 1905–1910

Specifications
- Parent case: .375 Flanged Nitro Express
- Case type: Rimmed, bottleneck
- Bullet diameter: .311 in (7.9 mm)
- Neck diameter: .343 in (8.7 mm)
- Shoulder diameter: .390 in (9.9 mm)
- Base diameter: .457 in (11.6 mm)
- Rim diameter: .505 in (12.8 mm)
- Case length: 2.5 in (64 mm)
- Overall length: 3.36 in (85 mm)

Ballistic performance
Bullet mass/type	Velocity	Energy
215 gr (14 g) SP	2,500 ft/s (760 m/s)	2,981 ft⋅lbf (4,042 J)
200 gr (13 g) SP	2,726 ft/s (831 m/s)	2,980 ft⋅lbf (4,040 J)
225 gr (15 g) Swift FMJ match	2,470 ft/s (750 m/s)	3,047 ft⋅lbf (4,131 J)
- Source: Cartridges of the World.

The .375/303 Westley Richards Accelerated Express, also known as the .375/303 Axite, is an obsolete medium bore rifle cartridge.

It was a high velocity, rimmed, bottlenecked cartridge. It was loaded with Axite, a new smokeless powder developed by Kynoch and said by them to be "comparatively free from erosion and corrosion effects". The cartridge's power was considered about the same as the .300 H&H Magnum.

== Overview ==
The .375/303 Westley Richards Accelerated Express was designed by Westley Richards and introduced in 1905, being listed in Westley Richards' catalogues for several years thereafter. In 1909 it was also listed in Charles Lancaster & Co's catalogue and the Webley & Scott trade catalogue of 1914. The cartridge was chambered in double rifles with Lancaster oval-bore rifling, as well as single shot falling block rifles and in Lee-action magazine rifles manufactured by both Westley Richards and Lancaster.

The inclusion of ".375" in the cartridge's name leads to some confusion, but a comparison of case base diameters suggest it refers to the older .375 Flanged NE 2 1/2, a naming consistent with other British hunting cartridges of the era such as the .450/400 Nitro Express, .577/500 Nitro Express, etc. Since .375 Flanged NE is itself a necked-up and lengthened .303 British, .375/303 appears to be its second-generation derivative.

Upon its introduction the .375/303 Westley Richards Accelerated Express was considered one of the highest velocity cartridges available. This attracted military attention and in 1906 it was demonstrated to officials from the War Office and Admiralty, as well as representatives from the Japanese, Russian, Italian and other governments.

The case length is given as 2 1/2 inches (64 mm) total length 3 3/8 inches (86 mm) inches, with a spire point bullet. An Axite charge of 44.5 grains behind a 215 grain bullet, giving a pressure of 18 tons per square inch. Muzzle velocity is given as 2,500 ft/s (760 m/s) and a muzzle energy of 2980 foot-pounds; at 100 yd (91 m): 2,248 ft/s (685 m/s) and 2409 ft-pounds.

The cartridge did not have a long life because in 1907 British authorities banned military-calibre rifles in India and Sudan. It was superseded by the more powerful .318 Westley Richards in Westley Richards catalogues from 1910.

== See also ==
- 8×60mm S
- List of rifle cartridges
- List of rimmed cartridges
