= .475 Nitro Express =

Rifle cartridge

- Type: Rifle
- Place of origin: Britain

Specifications
- Case type: rimmed straight
- Bullet diameter: .483 in (12.3 mm)
- Neck diameter: .507 in (12.9 mm)
- Base diameter: .545 in (13.8 mm)
- Rim diameter: .625 in (15.9 mm)
- Rim thickness: .045 in (1.1 mm)
- Case length: 3.25 in (83 mm)
- Overall length: 3.98 in (101 mm)
- Primer type: Boxer

Ballistic performance
Bullet mass/type	Velocity	Energy
480 gr (31 g)	2,175 ft/s (663 m/s)	5,040 ft⋅lbf (6,830 J)
500 gr (32 g)	2,125 ft/s (648 m/s)	5,030 ft⋅lbf (6,820 J)

The .475 Nitro Express is a British rifle cartridge developed in the early 20th century.

== Design ==
The .475 Nitro Express is a slightly tapered, non-bottlenecked rimmed cartridge very similar in appearance to the .450 Nitro Express, that is designed for use in single-shot and double rifles.

Original loadings fired a 480 gr (31 g) projectile at a listed speed of 2,175 ft/s (663 m/s), these loadings are still available, additionally Westley Richards have a 500 gr (32 g) loading with a listed speed of 2,125 ft/s (648 m/s).

== History ==
It is believed the .475 Nitro Express was introduced around 1900, well before the British Army 1907 ban of .450 caliber ammunition into India and the Sudan which saw the development of the ballistically very similar .500/465 Nitro Express, .470 Nitro Express, .475 No 2 Nitro Express, and .476 Nitro Express.

Firearms historians remain unclear who developed the .475 Nitro Express, it is likely that a combination of companies going out of business and merging, along with records being lost or destroyed during the London blitz will mean the origins of this cartridge will never be known.

The .475 Nitro Express has never enjoyed the success of any of the cartridges listed above, largely because it was never adopted by any of the major rifle manufacturers. Due to this, rifles in this calibre have always been rare, generally from lesser known makers such as W.W. Greener, Army & Navy and Manton of Calcutta.

== Use ==
The .475 Nitro Express is considered a good large-bore round, suitable for all big game, its power is very similar to the .470 Nitro Express. Ballistically it is almost identical to the .450 Nitro Express, with a larger diameter bullet; whether this is an advantage remains in dispute.

== See also ==
- Nitro Express
- List of rifle cartridges
- 13 mm caliber
