= .475 No 2 Nitro Express =

Rifle cartridge

- Type: Rifle
- Place of origin: United Kingdom

Service history
- In service: 1915–1916
- Used by: British Army
- Wars: World War I

Production history
- Designer: Eley Brothers
- Designed: Early 1900s

Specifications
- Parent case: .450 No 2 Nitro Express
- Case type: Rimmed, bottlenecked
- Bullet diameter: .483 in (12.3 mm)
- Neck diameter: .510 in (13.0 mm)
- Shoulder diameter: .547 in (13.9 mm)
- Base diameter: .576 in (14.6 mm)
- Rim diameter: .665 in (16.9 mm)
- Case length: 3.49 in (89 mm)
- Overall length: 4.26 in (108 mm)
- Primer type: Berdan .254 in (6.5 mm)

Ballistic performance
Bullet mass/type	Velocity	Energy
480 gr (31 g)	2,200 ft/s (670 m/s)	5,170 ft⋅lbf (7,010 J)
- Sources: Barnes & Kynoch.

.475 No 2 Jeffery

Production history
- Designer: W. J. Jeffery & Co.
- Produced: 1906

Specifications
- Bullet diameter: .489 in (12.4 mm)

Ballistic performance
Bullet mass/type	Velocity	Energy
500 gr (32 g)	2,120 ft/s (650 m/s)	5,000 ft⋅lbf (6,800 J)
- Sources: Barnes & Kynoch.

The .475 No 2 Nitro Express is a British rifle cartridge developed by Eley Brothers in the early 20th century.

== Design ==
The .475 No 2 Nitro Express is a rimmed bottle necked cartridge designed for use in single-shot and double rifles. The .475 No 2 Nitro Express is a very large, impressive cartridge, the empty round is 3.5 in (89 mm) long with an overall length of 4.26 in (108 mm).

The standard factory load fires a .483 in (12.3 mm) diameter 480 gr (31 g) bullet at 2,200 ft/s (670 m/s), although two powder charges were available with either 80 gr (5.2 g) or 85 gr (5.5 g) of cordite.

=== .475 No 2 Jeffery ===
W. J. Jeffery & Co. offered an alternate loading, known as the .475 No 2 Jeffery which fired a slightly larger .489 in (12.4 mm) diameter 500 gr (32 g) projectile at 2,150 ft/s (660 m/s), although again multiple powder charges were available, with either 75 gr (4.9 g), 80 gr (5.2 g) or 85 gr (5.5 g) of cordite. Jefferys built a very fine handling double rifle for this round with a 24 in (610 mm) barrel that weighed only 11 lb (5.0 kg) but retaining moderate recoil.

== History ==
The .475 No 2 Nitro Express is one of several rounds developed in response to the British Army 1907 ban of .450 caliber ammunition into India and the Sudan which saw the development of the ballistically very similar .500/465 Nitro Express, .470 Nitro Express, .475 Nitro Express, and .476 Nitro Express.

Eley created the .475 No 2 Nitro Express by necking up their earlier .450 No 2 Nitro Express.

=== WWI service ===
In 1914 and early 1915, German snipers were engaging British Army positions with impunity from behind steel plates that were impervious to .303 British ball ammunition. In an attempt to counter this threat, the British War Office purchased sixty-two large bore sporting rifles from British rifle makers which were issued to Regiments, including a single .475 No 2 Nitro Express rifle. These large bore rifles proved very effective against the steel plates used by the Germans, in his book Sniping in France 1914-18, MAJ H. Hesketh-Prichard, DSO, MC stated they "pierced them like butter."

== Use ==
The .475 No 2 Nitro Express is considered good general purpose round, suitable for all big game in Africa and India, its power is very similar to the .450 Nitro Express, with a larger diameter bullet; whether this is an advantage remains in dispute.

In his African Rifles and Cartridges, John "Pondoro" Taylor stated the .475 No 2 Nitro Express is "an eminently satisfactory shell and a certain killer - but don't let yourself be hypnotised by that great fat gleaming shell into the belief that you have something comparable with the atomic bomb to play with!"

Because of the larger diameter bullet, .475 No 2 Jeffery rounds cannot be fired through .475 No.2 Nitro Express rifles.

== See also ==
- 12 mm caliber
- List of rifle cartridges
- Nitro Express
