= .360 No. 2 Nitro Express =

Centerfire rifle cartridge

- Type: Rifle
- Place of origin: United Kingdom

Production history
- Designer: Eley Brothers
- Designed: 1905

Specifications
- Case type: Rimmed, bottlenecked
- Bullet diameter: .367 in (9.3 mm)
- Neck diameter: .393 in (10.0 mm)
- Shoulder diameter: .517 in (13.1 mm)
- Base diameter: .539 in (13.7 mm)
- Rim diameter: .631 in (16.0 mm)
- Rim thickness: .045 in (1.1 mm)
- Case length: 3 in (76 mm)
- Overall length: 3.85 in (98 mm)
- Case capacity: 115.3 gr H_{2}O (7.47 cm^{3})

Ballistic performance
| Bullet mass/type | Velocity | Energy |
|---|---|---|
| 320 gr (21 g) SP | 2,150 ft/s (660 m/s) | 3,198 ft⋅lbf (4,336 J) |
- Test barrel length: 28; Sources: Cartridges of the World & Kynoch.

The .360 No. 2 Nitro Express is a centerfire rifle cartridge developed by Eley Brothers and introduced in 1905.

== Design ==
The .360 No. 2 Nitro Express is a rimmed, bottlenecked cartridge designed for use in single shot and double rifles.

The .360 No. 2 Nitro Express fires a .367 in (9.3 mm) calibre, 320 gr (21 g) bullet at a velocity of 2,150 ft/s (660 m/s). As is common with cartridges for double rifles, due to the need to regulate the two barrels to the same point of aim, the .360 No. 2 Nitro Express was offered in only one loading. This cartridge is noted for the extremely low chamber pressures it generates due to its cartridge capacity, the lowest of any cartridge in its class.

== History ==
Eley created the .360 No. 2 Nitro Express by necking down the .400 Jeffery Nitro Express and adding a more rounded shoulder. Introduced in 1905, some writers have stated this cartridge never achieved the popularity it deserved because of the arrival of the .375 H&H Magnum seven years later.

.360 No. 2 Nitro Express cartridges can still be sourced today by manufacturers such as Kynoch, whilst reloaders can reform cartridges from .400 Jeffery Nitro Express cartridges.

== Use ==
The .360 No. 2 Nitro Express is considered suitable for use for hunting all thin-skinned African or Indian game.

In his African Rifles and Cartridges, John "Pondoro" Taylor described the .360 No. 2 Nitro Express as a splendid cartridge, stating it was "ideally suited for use in doubles and single-loaders".

== See also ==
- 9 mm rifle cartridges
- List of rifle cartridges
- Nitro Express
