= H&H Magnum =

H&H Magnum may refer to:

- .244 H&H Magnum
- .275 H&H Magnum
- .300 H&H Magnum
- .375 H&H Magnum
- .400 H&H Magnum
- .465 H&H Magnum

== See also ==
- List of rifle cartridges
- H Magnum, Ivory Coast / French rapper
