= .500/450 Nitro Express =

Rifle cartridge

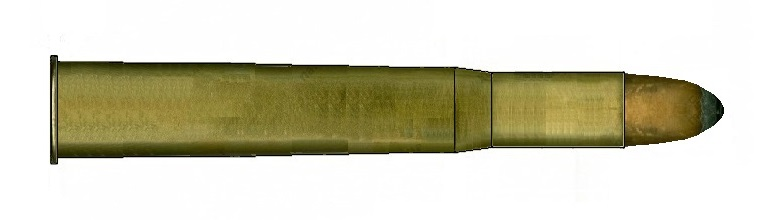
- Type: Rifle
- Place of origin: England

Production history
- Designer: Holland & Holland
- Designed: late 1890s

Specifications
- Parent case: .500/450 Magnum Black Powder Express
- Case type: Rimmed, bottleneck
- Bullet diameter: .458 in (11.6 mm)
- Neck diameter: .479 in (12.2 mm)
- Shoulder diameter: .500 in (12.7 mm)
- Base diameter: .570 in (14.5 mm)
- Rim diameter: .645 in (16.4 mm)
- Rim thickness: 0.040 in (1.0 mm)
- Case length: 3.25 in (83 mm)
- Overall length: 3.91 in (99 mm)
- Case capacity: 141.4 gr H_{2}O (9.16 cm^{3})
- Primer type: Berdan #40

Ballistic performance
Bullet mass/type	Velocity	Energy
480 gr (31 g) SN	2,175 ft/s (663 m/s)	5,050 ft⋅lbf (6,850 J)

The .500/450 Magnum Nitro Express is a large bore centerfire rifle cartridge developed by Holland & Holland.

== Design ==
The .500/450 Nitro Express is a rimmed bottlenecked cartridge designed for use in single-shot and double rifles. It is based on the old black-powder .500/450 Magnum Black Powder Express. It fires a .458-inch (11.6 mm) 480-grain (31 g) projectile at over 2,175 feet per second (663 m/s).

== Dimensions ==
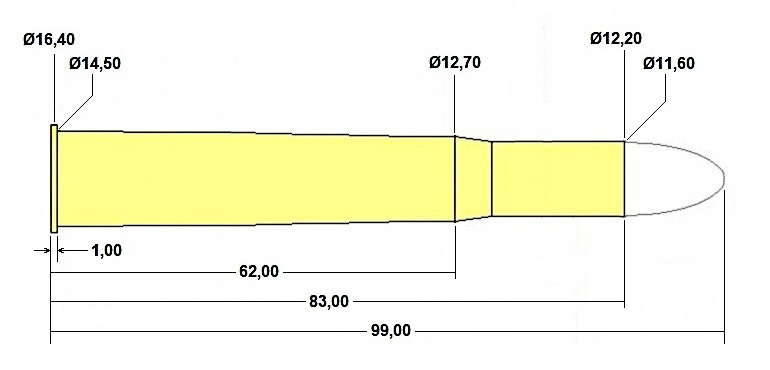

== History ==
In response to initial case extraction problems with John Rigby & Company's revolutionary .450 Nitro Express, both Eley Brothers and Holland & Holland looked to develop alternatives that would match that excellent cartridge in performance. Whilst Eley developed the completely new, mammoth .450 No 2 Nitro Express, Holland & Holland followed Rigby's example and loaded the old black powder .500/450 Magnum Black Powder Express with cordite, creating the .500/450 Nitro Express. The larger case capacity allowed the same ballistics at reduced chamber pressures to the .450 Nitro Express. 500/450 Magnum Nitro Express was introduced by Holland & Holland for their single shot and double rifles during the late 1890s.

By the time the .500/450 Nitro Express appeared, the early issues with the .450 Nitro Express had been resolved, and it quickly became the most popular and widely used Elephant hunting round, leaving the .500/450 Nitro Express behind in popularity. In 1907, the .500/450 Nitro Express's fortunes were further eroded by the British Army's ban of .450 caliber ammunition into India and the Sudan. In response to this ban, Holland & Holland developed their .500/465 Nitro Express. By the time the ban was lifted, Mauser's Gewehr 98 bolt actioned rifles offered cheaper alternatives to the expensive double rifles required by the Nitro Express cartridges.

== Use ==
Ballistically the .500/450 Nitro Express is almost identical to the .450 Nitro Express and is considered a good large-bore round, suitable for all dangerous game.

One prominent user of the .500/450 Nitro Express was Theodore Roosevelt who carried a Holland & Holland double rifle in this calibre, along with a .405 Winchester and a .30-03 during the 1909-1910 Smithsonian–Roosevelt African Expedition.

== See also ==
- Nitro Express
- 11 mm caliber
- List of rifle cartridges
