= .500/465 Nitro Express =

Rifle cartridge

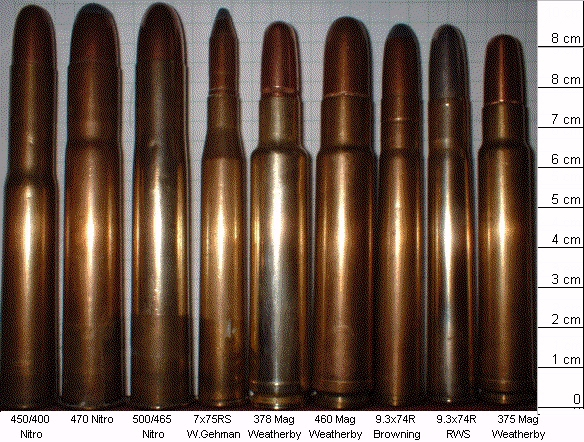
- Type: Rifle
- Place of origin: United Kingdom

Production history
- Designer: Holland & Holland
- Designed: 1907
- Produced: 1907

Specifications
- Parent case: .500 Nitro Express 3 1/4 in
- Case type: Rimmed, bottleneck
- Bullet diameter: .468 in (11.9 mm)
- Land diameter: .459 in (11.7 mm)
- Neck diameter: .491 in (12.5 mm)
- Shoulder diameter: .534 in (13.6 mm)
- Base diameter: .574 in (14.6 mm)
- Rim diameter: .655 in (16.6 mm)
- Rim thickness: .040 in (1.0 mm)
- Case length: 3.25 in (83 mm)
- Overall length: 3.90 in (99 mm)
- Primer type: Berdan 0.254 inch

Ballistic performance
Bullet mass/type	Velocity	Energy
480 gr (31 g)	2,150 ft/s (660 m/s)	4,930 ft⋅lbf (6,680 J)
- Test barrel length: 28 inches Sources: municon.org & Kynoch

The .500/465 Nitro Express is a large bore centerfire rifle cartridge developed by Holland & Holland and introduced in 1907.

== Development ==
The .500/465 Nitro Express is one of several rounds (including the .470 Nitro Express, .475 Nitro Express, .475 No. 2 Nitro Express and .476 Nitro Express) developed as a replacement for the .500/450 Nitro Express following the British authorities' 1907 ban of military caliber ammunition in India and the Sudan, all with comparable performance.

Holland & Holland created the .500/465 Nitro Express by necking down the .500 Nitro Express 3 1/4 in.

The .500/465 Nitro Express is designed for use in single-shot and double rifles.

== See also ==
- Nitro Express
- 12 mm caliber
- List of rifle cartridges
