= .450 No 2 Nitro Express =

Rifle cartridge

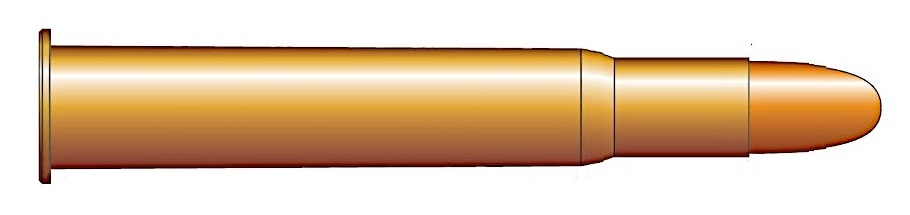
- Type: Rifle
- Place of origin: United Kingdom

Production history
- Designer: Eley Brothers
- Designed: 1903
- Produced: 1903–present

Specifications
- Case type: Rimmed, bottleneck
- Bullet diameter: .455 in (11.6 mm)
- Neck diameter: .477 in (12.1 mm)
- Base diameter: .518 in (13.2 mm)
- Rim diameter: .650 in (16.5 mm)
- Rim thickness: .040 in (1.0 mm)
- Case length: 3.5 in (89 mm)
- Overall length: 4.28 in (109 mm)
- Case capacity: 169.3 gr H_{2}O (10.97 cm^{3})

Ballistic performance
Bullet mass/type	Velocity	Energy
480 gr (31 g)	2,175 ft/s (663 m/s)	5,050 ft⋅lbf (6,850 J)
- Test barrel length: 28 inches Sources: Barnes & Kynoch.

The .450 No 2 Nitro Express, also known as the .450 Nitro Express 3 1/2-inch, was developed by Eley Brothers in 1903.

== Design ==
The .450 No 2 Nitro Express is rimmed, bottlenecked, .458-inch (11.6 mm) calibre cartridge designed for use in single-shot and double rifles, it fires a 480-grain (31 g) projectile at over 2,175 feet per second (663 m/s).

The .450 No 2 Nitro Express has a massive 3.5-inch (89 mm) long cartridge case which has a large case capacity and compared to other similar Nitro Express cartridges has a thicker rim and heavier walls. The size of the cartridge case gives it some of the lowest chamber pressures amongst the Nitro Express cartridges which, when combined with its thick rim and heavy walls, makes it almost impervious to sticking in the chamber.

== Dimensions ==
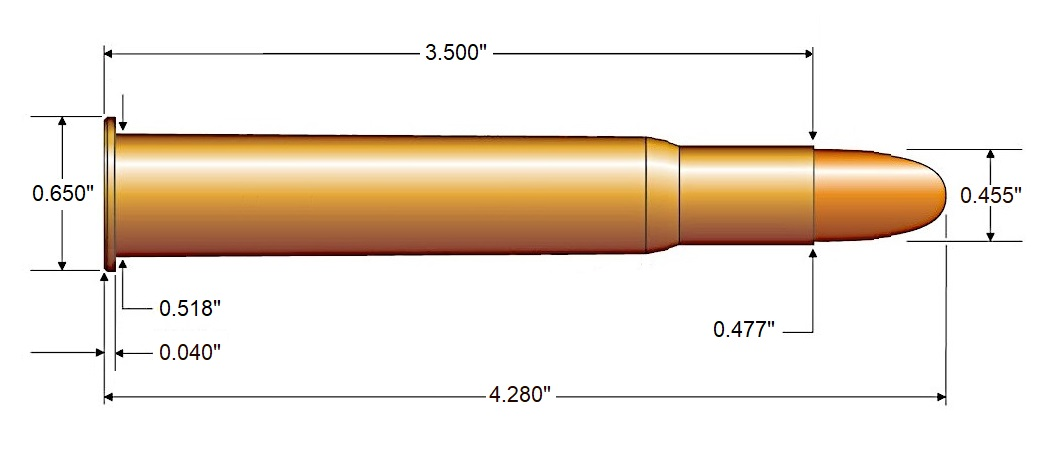

== History ==
Following early extraction problems encountered with the revolutionary .450 Nitro Express which had been created by John Rigby & Company in 1898, Eley took the unusual step for the time of creating their own completely new cartridge and release it to the market in 1903, allowing all rifle makers to chamber weapons for their round. This was unusual for two reasons, the first was this cartridge has no blackpowder express forebear, the second is it was designed by an ammunition maker, as most cartridges of the period were designed by rifle makers. The .450 No 2 Nitro Express was so named to differentiate it from the original.

Ballistically, the .450 No 2 Nitro Express is almost identical to the original .450 Nitro Express and Holland & Holland's .500/450 Nitro Express also intended to replace the original. The early problems of the .450 Nitro Express were however soon resolved and the .450 No 2 Nitro Express was never as popular as its predecessor.

Following the British Army 1907 ban of .450 caliber ammunition into India and the Sudan, Eley developed the .475 No. 2 Nitro Express by necking up the .450 No 2 Nitro Express.

== Use ==
The .450 No 2 Nitro Express is suitable for all dangerous game including elephant. In his African Rifles and Cartridges, John "Pondoro" Taylor states the .450 No 2 Nitro Express is as good as but no better than any other .450-.476 calibre Nitro Express cartridges in terms of killing power. Taylor further states there is a psychological appeal attached to the .450 No 2 Nitro Express, the size of the enormous cartridge giving the hunter confidence that they are carrying a deadlier weapon that one chambering a similar cartridge.

Pondoro Taylor owned four rifles chambered in .450 No 2 Nitro Express, with them he killed several hundred elephant, scores of rhinoceros and several hundred buffalo. Other notable users of this cartridge include Philip Percival who hunted with a pair of .450 No 2 Nitro Express boxlock double rifles made by Joseph Lang, and Nripendra Narayan, Maharaja of Koch Bihar, who hunted with a large battery of rifles including a .450 No 2 Nitro Express double rifle by Manton & Co.

== See also ==
- List of rifle cartridges
- 11 mm caliber other cartridges of similar caliber size.
- Nitro Express
