= Nitro Express =

British cartridge family

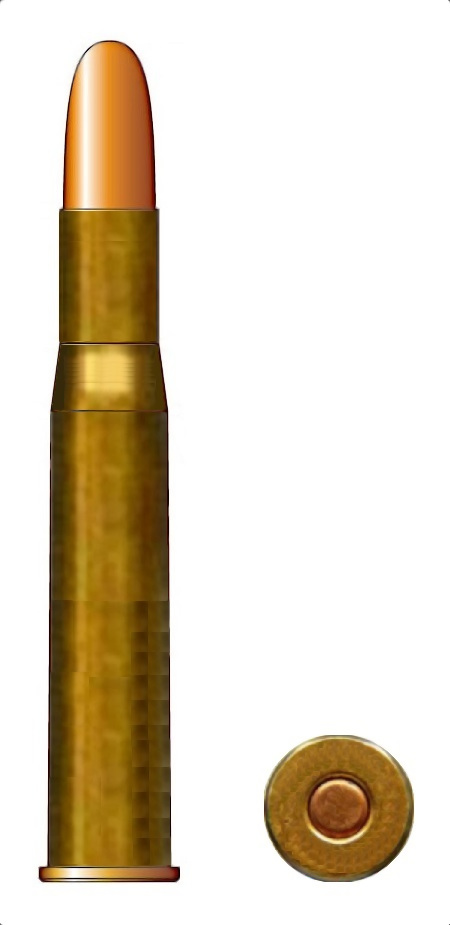
.450/400 Jeffery Nitro Express bullet and cartridge

The Nitro Express (NE) series of cartridges are used in large-bore hunting rifles, also known as elephant guns or express rifles, but later came to include smaller bore high velocity (for the time) British cartridges.

== Name ==
The term "Express" was coined by James Purdey in 1856, derived from the express train, to publicise the bullet velocity of his double rifles and became common parlance for many rifle cartridges. The addition of the word "Nitro" stemmed from the propellant used in these cartridges, cordite, which is composed of nitrocellulose and nitroglycerine.

== Evolution ==
=== Early developments ===
The .450 Nitro Express was introduced by John Rigby & Company in 1898. It was developed by loading the existing .450 Black Powder Express cartridge with cordite. The .450 NE was used for hunting dangerous game in Africa and India.

Early extraction problems with the .450 NE was the catalyst for Holland & Holland to develop the .500/450 Nitro Express and Eley Brothers the .450 No 2 Nitro Express both with very similar ballistics and performance to the original. Rigby soon solved the problems with the .450 NE, which quickly became the standard big-game cartridge used throughout Britain's African colonies and India.

With the success of the .450 NE, various people (it is not clear who) decided to follow Rigby's example and load the old .450/400 Black Powder Express, .500 Black Powder Express and .577 Black Powder Express cartridges with cordite, creating the .450/400 Nitro Express, .500 Nitro Express and .577 Nitro Express, the latter two offering greater power than the .450s at the expense of greater rifle weight and recoil. In 1903 Jeffery & Co decided to outdo them all, creating the .600 Nitro Express, the most powerful sporting cartridge commercially available for over half a century.

Whilst more powerful, the .500, .577 and .600 NE rifles were all too heavy for everyday use and remained specialist tools for the professional hunter, the .450s remained the most popular, but political events were to soon change this.

=== Rise of the Mauser ===
In 1899 Rigby approached the engineers at Mauser to make a special Gewehr 98 bolt action to handle their .400/350 Nitro Express. The introduction of this rifle in 1900 was the birth of the magnum length bolt action, paving the way for such cartridges as the .375 H&H and .416 Rigby

The term Nitro Express came to be applied to many of these rimless cartridges also.

=== 1907 British ban ===
In the late 1890s, the British Empire was facing a series of internal insurrections in India and the Sudan, and the .450 calibre .577/450 Martini–Henry rifle was the most widely distributed firearm in the hands of the anti-British forces. In 1907 the British Army banned all .450 calibre (as well as .303 and .577, two other military calibres) sporting rifles and ammunition from importation into India and East Africa, the two major destinations for .450 NE rifles and ammunition. Whilst the .450 cartridges could not be loaded into a Martini–Henry rifle, it was feared the bullets could be pulled and used to reload expended .577/.450 cartridges.

What resulted was a rush by British rifle and ammunition makers to develop a substitute, Holland & Holland created the .500/465 Nitro Express, Joseph Lang the .470 Nitro Express, an unidentified firm the .475 Nitro Express, Eley Brothers the .475 No 2 Nitro Express and Westley Richards the .476 Nitro Express, with the .470 NE becoming the most popular.

== List of Nitro Express cartridges ==
- .240 Belted Nitro Express
- .240 Flanged Nitro Express
- .242 Rimless Nitro Express
- .26 Rimless Nitro Express
- .280 Flanged Nitro Express
- .280 Jeffery Rimless Nitro Express
- .303 British Rimmed Nitro Express
- .318 Rimless Nitro Express
- .333 Rimless Nitro Express
- .333 Flanged Nitro Express
- .350 Rigby Nitro Express
- .400/350 Nitro Express
- .360 Nitro Express
- .360 No 2 Nitro Express
- .400/360 Nitro Express
- .369 Nitro Express
- .375 Belted Rimless Nitro Express
- .375 Flanged Nitro Express
- .400/375 Belted Nitro Express
- .400 Jeffery Nitro Express
- .450/400 Nitro Express
- .404 Rimless Nitro Express
- .500/416 Nitro Express
- .450 Nitro Express
- .450 No 2 Nitro Express
- .500/450 Nitro Express
- .500/465 Nitro Express
- .470 Nitro Express
- .475 Nitro Express
- .475 No 2 Nitro Express
- .476 Nitro Express
- .500 Nitro Express
- .500 Jeffery Nitro Express
- .505 Rimless Nitro Express
- .577/500 Nitro Express
- .510 Nitro Express
- .577 Nitro Express
- .600/577 Rewa Nitro Express
- .600 Nitro Express
- .700/500 Rafiki Nitro Express
- .700/577 Sahar Nitro Express
- .700 Nitro Express
