= The Queen's Award for Enterprise: Innovation (Technology) (1988) =

1988 English Royal Award for Enterprise & Innovation in Technological Fields

The Queen's Award for Enterprise: Innovation (Technology) (1988) was awarded on 21 April 1988, by Queen Elizabeth II.

== Recipients ==
The following organisations were awarded this year.

- A.E.S. Engineering Ltd of Rotherham, South Yorkshire for the development of mechanical shaft seals.
- Airopak Division of Air Products Ltd of Crewe, Cheshire for the development of solvent resistant polythene containers using an in-line fluorisation process.
- The Filton Unit of The Civil Aircraft Division of British Aerospace plc of Bristol for the development of wings for the Airbus A320 Airliner (jointly with The Aerodynamics Department of The Royal Aircraft Establishment of The Ministry of Defence.)
- The Speciality and Aerospace Division of British Alcan Aluminium plc of Gerrards Cross, Buckinghamshire for the development of lightweight aluminium alloys for aerospace applications (jointly with The Materials & Structures Department of The Royal Aircraft Establishment of The Ministry of Defence.)
- The Headquarters Technical Department of British Coal Corporation of Stanhope Bretby, Burton-on-Trent, Staffordshire for the development of an in-seam seismic method for detecting geological faults in coal seams.
- The On Line Inspection Centre of British Gas plc of Cramlington, Northumberland for the development of a high performance online pipeline inspection system.
- The Research & Development Department of British Gypsum Ltd of East Leake, Loughborough, Leicestershire for the development of an improved kettle for the calcination of gypsum.
- John Brown Automation Ltd of Coventry, West Midlands for the development of an automatic system for automotive clutches.
- The Vascutek Division of Coats Viyella Medical Ltd of Inchinnan, Renfrewshire for the development of the GELSEAL TRIXIAL nonporous vascular prosthesis.
- Crosrol Ltd of Holmfield, Halifax, West Yorkshire for the development of the CROSROL Mk4 CARD high performance carding machine.
- Cybrid Ltd of Leighton Buzzard, Bedfordshire for the development of an automated pattern scanning and nesting system for the garment industry.
- The Aerodynamics Department of The Royal Aircraft Establishment of The Ministry of Defence of Farnborough, Hampshire for the development of wings for the Airbus A320 Airliner. (Jointly with The Filton Unit of The Civil Aircraft Division of British Aerospace pic.)
- The Materials & Structures Department of The Royal Aircraft Establishment of The Ministry of Defence of Farnborough, Hampshire for the development of lightweight aluminium alloys for aerospace applications (jointly with The Speciality and Aerospace Division of British Alcan Aluminium pic.)
- Dowty Meco Ltd of Worcester, Worcestershire for the development of heavy duty armoured flexible conveyors for longwall coal mining.
- Dowty Filtration Technology Division of Dowty Mining Equipment Ltd of Ashchurch, Tewkesbury, Gloucestershire for the development of The Dowty "Jetflush" filter automatic self-cleaning filtration system.
- Eley Limited of Witton, Birmingham, West Midlands for the development of a safer method of producing percussion type primers for ammunition.
- The Instrument Systems Division of GEC Avionics Ltd of Rochester, Kent for the development of Standard Central Air Data Computers (SCADC) for aircraft.
- GKN Composites Ltd of Telford, Shropshire for the development of vehicle leaf springs made from glass fibre and epoxy resin (jointly with GKN Technology Ltd)
- GKN Technology Ltd of Wolverhampton, West Midlands for the development of vehicle leaf springs made from glass fibre and epoxy resin (jointly with GKN Composites Ltd)
- Graseby Ionics Ltd of Watford, Hertfordshire for the development of a hand-held Chemical Agent Monitor.
- Herga Electric Ltd of Bury St. Edmunds, Suffolk for the development of fibre-optic sensors.
- Hydraroll Ltd of Gaerwen, Isle of Anglesey, Gwynedd for the development of the "Hydraroll" shipchain and roller track system for transfer of pallets.
- IBM United Kingdom Laboratories Ltd of Portsmouth, Hampshire for the development of the IBM 9335 high density magnetic storage sub-system.
- The Systems Engineering and Development Unit of ICL Mainframe Systems of International Computers Ltd of West Gorton, Manchester for the design and application of nodal architecture in the development of the ICL Series 39 "multiprocessor" computer systems.
- IMI Titanium Ltd of Witton, Birmingham, West Midlands for the development of high temperature creep resistant titanium alloys for aircraft gas turbines.
- The Automotive Group of ICI Paints Division of Imperial Chemical Industries plc. of Slough, Berkshire for the development of "Aquabase" low emission surface coatings for automotive vehicles.
- Itek Colour Graphics Ltd of Cheltenham, Gloucestershire for the development of electronic colour separation scanners for the printing industry.
- Materials Technology Group of The Laboratory of The Government Chemist. of London SE1 for the development of glass-ionomer cements for dentistry.
- Malvern Instruments Ltd of Malvern, Worcestershire for the development of an instrument to determine particle sizes using laser light diffraction.
- K S Paul Products Ltd of London N18 for the development of PolyButylCuprysil (PBC), an advanced lubricant with anti-seize and anti-corrosion properties.
- Quantel Ltd of Newbury, Berkshire for the development of "HARRY" a digital video recording, editing, processing and compositing system.
- Queensgate Instruments Ltd of Ascot, Berkshire for the development of servo-stabilised scanning interferometers.
- Racal Marine Systems Ltd of New Maiden, Surrey for the development of the "MICRO-FIX" microwave electronic positioning system.
- Response Company Ltd of Winchester, Hampshire for the development of solid state electricity meters and energy audit systems.
- Reynolds Medical Ltd of Hertford, Hertfordshire for the development of the PATHFINDER 3 SYSTEM for high speed analysis of long term electrocardiograms.
- The Tay Project of Rolls-Royce plc. of Derby, Derbyshire for the development of the Tay engine.
- Safecom Ltd of Ashbourne, Derbyshire for the development of an electronic communications and safety system for use in mine shaft cages.
- Sigmex Ltd of Horsham, West Sussex for the development of the 6000 series of computer graphic terminals and generators.
- Technophone Ltd of Camberley, Surrey for the development of the PC 105 POCKETPHONE pocket cellular telephone.
- Thurne Engineering Company Ltd of Norwich, Norfolk for the development of the THURNE POLYSLICER versatile high speed industrial food sheer.
- Tunnel Refineries Ltd of London, SE10 for the production of vital gluten and glucose syrups from British Wheat.
- Varian-TEM Ltd of Crawley, West Sussex for the development of the Ximatron C series of radiotherapy simulators.
- Vickers Instruments of York, North Yorkshire for the development of a fully automated optical measuring instrument.
