= .600/577 Rewa =

Big bore rifle cartridge

- Type: Rifle
- Place of origin: England

Production history
- Designer: Holland & Holland
- Designed: 1929
- Produced: 1929–1957

Specifications
- Parent case: .600 Nitro Express
- Case type: Rimmed, bottleneck
- Bullet diameter: .584 in (14.8 mm)
- Neck diameter: .613 in (15.6 mm)
- Shoulder diameter: .646 in (16.4 mm)
- Base diameter: .697 in (17.7 mm)
- Rim diameter: .805 in (20.4 mm)
- Case length: 3 in (76 mm)
- Overall length: 3.83 in (97 mm)

Ballistic performance
Bullet mass/type	Velocity	Energy
750 gr (49 g)	2,150 ft/s (660 m/s)	7,697 ft⋅lbf (10,436 J)
- Sources: The Spanish Association of Cartridge Collectors & Czech Moravian Society of Collectors of Cartridges

The .600/577 Rewa, also known as the .600/577 Rewa Nitro Express, Holland's .600/577 and the .577 Rewa, is an obsolete big bore rifle cartridge.

== Overview ==
The .600/577 Rewa was developed and introduced by Holland & Holland in 1929 by a special order for Martand Singh, Maharaja of Rewa.

The .600/577 Rewa is a rimmed, bottlenecked centerfire rifle cartridge. The .600/577 Rewa is derived from the .600 Nitro Express necked down to accept the .582 in (14.8 mm) calibre bullet of the .577 Nitro Express. The .600/577 Rewa fires a 750 gr (49 g) bullet driven by 110 gr (7.1 g) of cordite.

Always rare, the .600/577 Rewa was produced by Holland & Holland until 1957, although it can still be purchased from Kynoch.

== See also ==
- 13 mm caliber
- Nitro Express
- List of rifle cartridges
- List of rimmed cartridges
