= .400/375 Belted Nitro Express =

Rifle cartridge

- Type: Rifle
- Place of origin: United Kingdom

Production history
- Designer: Holland & Holland
- Designed: 1905
- Produced: 1905

Specifications
- Case type: Belted, bottleneck
- Bullet diameter: .375 in (9.5 mm)
- Neck diameter: .397 in (10.1 mm)
- Shoulder diameter: .435 in (11.0 mm)
- Base diameter: .470 in (11.9 mm)
- Rim diameter: .466 in (11.8 mm)
- Case length: 2.5 in (64 mm)
- Overall length: 3 in (76 mm)

Ballistic performance
| Bullet mass/type | Velocity | Energy |
|---|---|---|
| 270 gr (17 g) | 2,150 ft/s (660 m/s) | 2,771 ft⋅lbf (3,757 J) |
| 235 gr (15 g) | 2,400 ft/s (730 m/s) | 2,840 ft⋅lbf (3,850 J) |
- Test barrel length: 27 inches Sources: Kynoch & Barnes & Amber.

The .400/375 Belted Nitro Express, also known as the .400/375 Holland & Holland and the .375 Velopex is a rifle cartridge designed by Holland & Holland and introduced in 1905.

== Development ==
The cartridge is unique in that it was the first ever cartridge to use a belted rim. The addition of a belt to a rimless cartridge design provided the advantage of allowing for correct headspacing of highly tapered cartridges (an advantage of rimmed cartridges) and smooth feeding through magazine rifles (the advantage of rimless cartridges).

The .400/375 Belted Nitro Express almost died at birth, as in 1905 a Berlin gunmaker, Ottoman Bock, designed the 9.3×62mm to fit into the Model 1898 Mauser bolt-action rifle, this cartridge easily eclipsed both the 9.5×57mm (1908) and the .400/375 Belted NE. In 1912 Holland & Holland created the .375 Holland & Holland Magnum utilising the same caliber in a much larger belted case, and the .400/375 Belted NE faded from production.

Kynoch still manufacture .400/375 Belted NE ammunition with a lighter loading.

== See also ==
- List of rifle cartridges
- 9 mm rifle cartridges
- Nitro Express
