= Arms Act, 1959 =

Act of the Parliament of India regulating arms and ammunition

Parliament of India
- Long title: An Act to consolidate and amend the law relating to arms and ammunition.
- Citation: Act No. 54 of 1959
- Territorial extent: India
- Assented to by: President
- Assented to: 23 December 1959
- Commenced: 1 October 1962

Repeals
- Indian Arms Act, 1878

Amended by
- Arms (Amendment) Act, 1971; Arms (Amendment) Act, 1983; Arms (Amendment) Act 1985; Arms (Amendment) Act, 1988; Arms (Amendment) Act, 2019
- Status: In force

The Arms Act, 1959 is an Act of the Parliament of India to consolidate and amend the law relating to arms and ammunition in order to curb illegal weapons and violence stemming from them. It replaced the Indian Arms Act, 1878.

The Arms Act was passed in 1959.

== Chapters ==
The act is divided into six chapters.

- Chapter I: Preliminary (Section 1 & 2)
  Provides a short title and definitions of terms used in the act
- Chapter II: Acquisition, Possession, Manufacture, Sale, Import, Export, and Transport of Arms and Ammunition (Section 3 to 12)
  Explains rules and regulations around acquisition, possession, manufacture, sale, import, export and transport of arms and ammunition in India.
- Chapter III: Provisions relating to licences (Section 13 to 18)
  Details how to procure license, rules around grant, refusal, fees for license.
- Chapter IV: Powers and Procedure (Section 19 to 24B)
  Provides details on the powers that the government officials have to enforce this act.
- Chapter V: Offences and penalties (Section 25 to 33)
  Explains punishments associated with breaking rules related to this act.
- Chapter VI: Miscellaneous (Section 34 to 46)
  Deals with the other miscellaneous parts of the act such as exemptions.

== Current affairs ==
The Act has undergone many changes since 1959, the most recent being in 2010 through an amendment for the Arms Act. There was also controversy around air guns to be included as part of this act which was rejected by the Supreme Court of India.

== Previous legislation ==
Prior to the Indian Rebellion of 1857, there were little to no gun control laws in British India. In 1878, the British colonial government, under the administration of Lord Lytton, introduced the Indian Arms Act 1878. The act, which regulated the manufacture, sale, possession and carrying of firearms in British India, made it a criminal offence to keep, bear or trade guns without a government license. Penalties for violating the act included being imprisoned for up to three years and fined; in cases of concealment or attempted concealment the guilty party could be imprisoned for up to seven years. The act included exceptions for certain groups in India, including Europeans, Anglo-Indian people, certain groups of Indian colonial officials and "all persons of Kodava race".

The Indian Arms Act 1878 came under repeated criticisms from Indian nationalists. In a 1918 recruitment leaflet written to encourage Indians to fight in World War I, Mahatma Gandhi voiced his disapproval of the act:

Among the many misdeeds of the British rule in India, history will look upon the Act depriving a whole nation of arms as the blackest. If we want the Arms Act to be repealed, if we want to learn the use of arms, here is a golden opportunity. If the middle classes render voluntary help to Government in the hour of its trial, distrust will disappear, and the ban on possessing arms will be withdrawn.

== Prohibited and Non-Prohibited Bore ==
The new Arms Rule 2016 classifies firearms into three categories: Prohibited Bore, restricted bore and Non-Prohibited Bore. All automatic firearms fall under the Prohibited Bore category. Semi auto rifles excluding shotguns upto 12 bore and less and .22 caliber falls under restricted category I(b). All calibers issued to service falls under restricted category I(c). Any firearm which can chamber and fire ammunition of the caliber .303, 7.62x39; 410,380; .455; 9mm is specified as Restricted Bore under The Arms Rules of 2016. After 2016 arms rules Indians saw relaxations in the type of arms they can use. The common firearms which people can buy today with a license are Semi auto shotgun upto 12 bore, Plump action shot gun, single barrel and double barreled shotguns upto 12 gauge, 30-06 (7.62x63mm) Springfield bolt action rifle (not semiauto), common firearms are 0.315 bolt-action rifles and 0.32 Smith&Wesson Long revolvers, 0.35" semi-automatic pistols and 12 Bore pump-action shotguns. and a wide range of .45, .40, .357, .380, .32, .22 pistols and revolvers. Semi auto rifles of .22 caliber are also allowed under permissible category.

== Stun Guns and Tasers ==
Under Indian Arms Act, 1956 stun guns and tasers are illegal to own and are considered as prohibited arms under Section 25 (1A) of the Arms Act.

== Knife legislation ==
Edged weapons like swords, machetes, spears, bowie knives and stilettos require license under the Arms Act. Sword sticks, daggers, throwing knives, bayonets and switchblades are illegal. Edged weapons are illegal to carry in public places, educational institutes, airports, railway stations and metro stations is illegal. Any knife with a blade length exceeding 9 inches or a blade width exceeding 2 inches will be considered illegal to carry.

== Pepper Spray ==
Pepper spray is legal and doesn't require a license or documentation to buy one. However, manufacturers need a government license. The rules of carrying pepper spray in public transport are unclear, especially in metro trains where the permission to carry it remains under the discretion of the Central Industrial Security Force due to risks of people carrying poison gas in pepper spray cans.

== Open Carry ==
Some restrictions may be in place to accommodate religious customs and beliefs. In these cases, specific groups may be able to carry knives according to their religious laws. For example, Nihang Sikhs can carry edged weapons and firearms after obtaining a license under the Arms Act and all Khalsa Sikhs are allowed to carry the kirpan in public. The Gurkha community is allowed to open carry khukris. However, there may be restrictions on the size of the kirpan that can be carried in public, and some states have specific laws against it. The Kodava community is allowed to carry swords and firearms without license only within the Kodagu district. In 2004 the Ananda Marga sect have been allowed to carry Trishulas (Trident) and knives in their religious processions. Shia Muslims are allowed to carry swords and knives but only during Muharram processions after obtaining permission from the respective local police department.

Licensed firearm owners can carry their weapons as concealed carry in public places excluding gun free zones. Handguns has to be holstered while rifles can be carried in its case or appropriate covers.

== See also ==
- Gun law in India
- Anti-terrorism legislation
- Prevention of Terrorism Act, 2002
- Terrorist and Disruptive Activities (Prevention) Act
