= .465 H&H Magnum =

Firearms cartridge introduced in 2003

.465 Holland & Holland Magnum
- Type: Rifle
- Place of origin: United Kingdom

Production history
- Designer: Holland & Holland
- Designed: 2003
- Produced: 2003–present

Specifications
- Parent case: .378 Weatherby Magnum
- Case type: Belted, bottleneck
- Bullet diameter: .468 in (11.9 mm)
- Land diameter: .459 in (11.7 mm)
- Neck diameter: .494 in (12.5 mm)
- Shoulder diameter: .531 in (13.5 mm)
- Base diameter: .582 in (14.8 mm)
- Rim diameter: .579 in (14.7 mm)
- Rim thickness: .063 in (1.6 mm)
- Case length: 2.894 in (73.5 mm)
- Overall length: 3.550 in (90.2 mm)
- Case capacity: 134 gr H_{2}O (8.7 cm^{3})
- Primer type: Large rifle, magnum
- Maximum pressure: 62,366 psi (430.00 MPa)

Ballistic performance
Bullet mass/type	Velocity	Energy
480 gr (31 g) SP/Solid	2,375 ft/s (724 m/s)	6,012 ft⋅lbf (8,151 J)

The .465 H&H Magnum also known as .465 Holland & Holland Magnum, is a modern big bore firearms cartridge. It was introduced by Holland & Holland in 2003 together with the .400 H&H Magnum. The .465 H&H Magnum is a .468 caliber, belted, bottleneck cartridge. The cartridge is a necked-up, shoulder-lowered tapered cartridge based on the .378 Weatherby Magnum case.

== General information ==
Holland & Holland began receiving requests from potential customers for a cartridge that would provide more power than the .375 H&H Magnum. Holland & Holland director Russell Wilkins undertook the project which culminated in the .400 H&H Magnum and the .465 H&H Magnum cartridge designs. The original design requirements called for a muzzle energy of over 6,000 ft⋅lbf (8,100 J). To meet this requirement Holland & Holland chose the .460 Weatherby Magnum case as a starting point in their design.

This .465 H&H Magnum cartridge is not the same as the famous .500/465 Nitro Express also designed by Holland & Holland for "India" double rifles. The .500/465 Nitro Express is the only other cartridge with the same bullet diameter as the .465 H&H Magnum. Both cartridges are designed to fire a 480-grain (31 g) .468 caliber (11.89 mm) bullet. Although the cartridge is capable of operating at rather high pressures, Holland & Holland chose to load the cartridge to a moderate pressure of around 47,000 psi (3,200 bar). Furthermore, the taper and shallow shoulder of the cartridge aids in the smooth, reliable feeding and extraction.

The .465 H&H Magnum is an excellent cartridge for all-around game and African dangerous game including the Big 5. It has a similar trajectory to that of the .375 H&H Magnum.

Ammunition for the .465 H&H Magnum is being manufactured by Wolfgang Romey for Holland & Holland.

== Specifications ==
Both .465 H&H Belted Magnum cartridge and chamber specifications were standardized by CIP on 2006-09-19.

The .465 H&H Magnum is based on the .460 Weatherby Magnum case, itself based on the .378 Weatherby Magnum. The .378 Wea. Mag. was itself based on adding a belt to the .416 Rigby case & giving it a Weatherby double radius shoulder. Holland & Holland took the .460 Weatherby case and moved the shoulder back, creating a longer neck for the cartridge, and increased the body taper of the cartridge. The case is also necked up to accept a .465 caliber (11.65 mm) bullet.

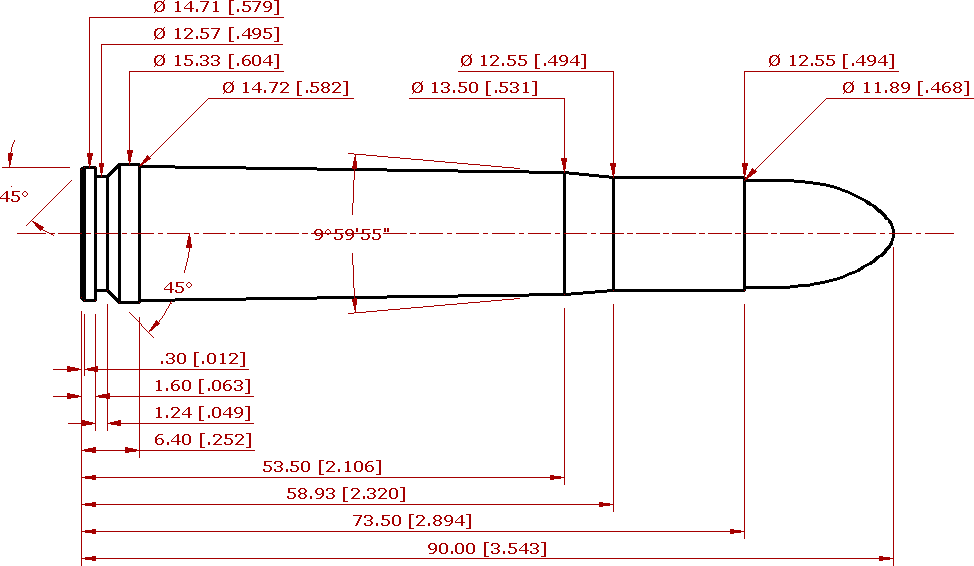
.465 Holland & Holland Magnum cartridge schematic: All dimensions in millimeters [inches].

Rifles chambered for the .465 H&H Magnum have a bore ∅ of 11.65 mm (0.459 in) and a groove ∅ of 11.87 mm (0.467 in). Twist rate for rifles can range from one revolution in 406 mm (16.0 in) to 711 mm (28.0 in). The maximum average pressure suggested for the cartridge is 4,300 bar (62,000 psi).

== See also ==
- Table of handgun and rifle cartridges
