= .400 H&H Magnum =

Rifle cartridge

.400 Holland & Holland Magnum
- Type: Rifle
- Place of origin: United Kingdom

Production history
- Designer: Russell Wilkin
- Designed: 2003
- Manufacturer: Holland & Holland
- Produced: 2003–present

Specifications
- Parent case: .375 H&H Magnum
- Case type: Belted, bottleneck
- Bullet diameter: .411 in (10.4 mm)
- Land diameter: .403 in (10.2 mm)
- Neck diameter: .441 in (11.2 mm)
- Shoulder diameter: .492 in (12.5 mm)
- Base diameter: .513 in (13.0 mm)
- Rim diameter: .532 in (13.5 mm)
- Rim thickness: .050 in (1.3 mm)
- Case length: 2.846 in (72.3 mm)
- Overall length: 3.550 in (90.2 mm)
- Case capacity: 104 gr H_{2}O (6.7 cm^{3})
- Primer type: Large rifle, magnum
- Maximum pressure: 63,817 psi (440.00 MPa)

Ballistic performance
Bullet mass/type	Velocity	Energy
400 gr (26 g) SP/Solid	2,375 ft/s (724 m/s)	5,009 ft⋅lbf (6,791 J)
- Test barrel length: 24; Source(s): Chuckhawks.com

The .400 H&H Magnum also known as .400 Holland & Holland Magnum is a belted rimless bottlenecked cartridge introduced by Holland & Holland. The cartridge was released together with the .465 H&H Magnum in 2003. It is based on the .375 H&H Magnum case.

== General information ==
The cartridge owes its development to hunters requesting Holland & Holland to develop a cartridge that would have increased power over the .375 H&H Magnum. The project was undertaken by Russell Wilkin, the technical director for Holland & Holland. The result was two cartridges: the .400 H&H Magnum and the .465 H&H magnum. The cartridge was launched in 2003 to the public in 2003 in the UK and Europe and became available in North America in 2008. It follows in a long line of illustrious big bore cartridges introduced by Holland & Holland, the last of which was the .700 Nitro Express.

The .400 H&H Magnum is a modern rifle cartridge designed for hunting large and dangerous game animals. The cartridge would be legal in countries which require a .400 minimum caliber for the hunting of dangerous game. It was engineered to provide dependable reliability in a tropical environment. The gradual tapering and moderate shoulder of the cartridge provides for reliable feeding and extraction of the cartridge.

Specifications of interest to reloaders include a standard magnum rim diameter of .532". Overall case length is 2.85" (the same as the .375 case), and the cartridge overall length is 3.50". Bullet diameter is .411" and factory-loaded bullets are to be supplied by Woodleigh of Australia. These will be the same 400 grain Premium solid and Weldcore soft point bullets sold to reloaders and used in .450/400 NE factory loads. In addition, Hornady offers a 300 grain .411" Interlock bullet to reloaders. This bullet is intended for the .405 Winchester, and with moderate reloads it should be quite suitable for North American CXP3 game in the .400 H&H. And one could probably use .410" jacketed pistol bullets intended for the .41 Magnum revolver cartridge for low velocity, low recoil practice loads.

== Performance ==
The .400 H&H Magnum is in the same class as the .416 Rigby and the .416 Remington Magnum with the arguably slight advantage of better sectional density given bullet of equal weight. The typical 400-grain (26 g) bullet will have a sectional density of .338 for the .400 H&H Magnum vs. .330 for the .416 caliber cartridges. The .400 H&H Magnum shares the same caliber with several .400 cartridges from the turn of the 20th century such as the .400 Jeffery Nitro Express, the 405 Winchester and the series of .450/400 cartridges.

Brass stock is available from Quality Cartridge. As of 2012 Holland & Holland and Mauser produce rifles of this caliber in Europe and Dakota Arms is the sole manufacturer of this rifle in the United States. Dakota Arms custom manufactures this caliber in their Model 97 Safari series. Bullets are available from different manufacturers such as Barnes, Hornady, Woodleigh, Kynoch and North Fork.

== See also ==
- Table of handgun and rifle cartridges
