= .450 Nitro Express =

Rifle cartridge

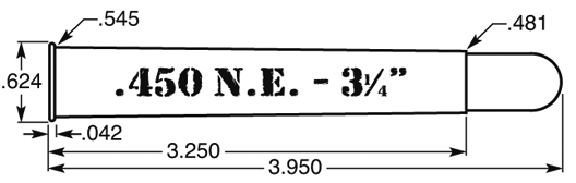
- Type: Rifle cartridge
- Place of origin: United Kingdom

Production history
- Designer: John Rigby & Company
- Designed: 1898
- Produced: 1898–present

Specifications
- Parent case: .450 Black Powder Express
- Case type: Rimmed, straight
- Bullet diameter: .458 in (11.6 mm)
- Neck diameter: .481 in (12.2 mm)
- Base diameter: .545 in (13.8 mm)
- Rim diameter: .624 in (15.8 mm)
- Rim thickness: .042 in (1.1 mm)
- Case length: 3.25 in (83 mm)
- Overall length: 3.95 in (100 mm)
- Case capacity: 130.0 gr H_{2}O (8.42 cm^{3})
- Rifling twist: 1-15 in (381 mm)
- Primer type: Boxer/Berdan
- Maximum pressure: 44,237 psi (305.00 MPa)

Ballistic performance
Bullet mass/type	Velocity	Energy
465 gr (30 g) Lead	2,150 ft/s (660 m/s)	4,770 ft⋅lbf (6,470 J)
480 gr (31 g) Lead	2,150 ft/s (660 m/s)	4,930 ft⋅lbf (6,680 J)
500 gr (32 g)	2,150 ft/s (660 m/s)	5,133 ft⋅lbf (6,959 J)
- Source: "Cartridges of the World" 500gr load specified by ADI-Powders

.450 Nitro Express also known as the .450 Nitro Express 3 1/4-inch is a rifle cartridge designed for hunting dangerous game such as elephant, rhino, cape buffalo, lion, and leopard. This cartridge is used almost exclusively in double rifles for hunting in the tropics or hot climates in general and is associated with the Golden Age of African safaris and Indian shikars.

== Development ==
The .450 Nitro Express was the first Nitro Express cartridge, developed around 1898 by John Rigby. This cartridge was based on the then popular .450 Black Powder Express case with 70 grains (5 g) of Cordite and a 480-grain (31 g) jacketed bullet. Muzzle velocity is listed at 2,150 feet per second (655 m/s) with 4,909 ft⋅lbf (6,656 J) of muzzle energy. This straight case has a length of 3.25 in (83 mm) with a .624 in (15.8 mm) rim.

Early cartridges used the black powder case that was designed for around 22,000 psi and not the 34,000 psi that the Cordite load generated. Case extraction was difficult, especially in warmer climates such as Africa and India where the cartridge was primarily used. To remedy this problem, a reinforced case was produced and Kynoch made a reduced load to lower the case pressure. Another problem lay in the sensitivity of Cordite, loads developed in the cool British climate performed differently in the tropical heat of Africa and India, resulting in excessive pressures. The manufacturers responded by developing "tropical loads" with reduced propellant.

These initial problems led to Holland & Holland developing the .500/450 Nitro Express and Eley Brothers developing the .450 No 2 Nitro Express, both of which offered very similar performance to the original .450 Nitro Express. By the time these two cartridges appeared, the early issues with the .450 Nitro Express had been resolved, and it quickly became the most popular and widely used dangerous-game hunting round.

Following the British Army 1907 ban of .450 caliber ammunition into India and the Sudan, instead of developing their own replacement, Rigby adopted Joseph Lang's .470 Nitro Express as their standard double rifle cartridge. By the time the ban was lifted the .470 NE had largely supplanted the .450 NE as the industry's most popular elephant cartridge, and Mauser's Gewehr 98 bolt actioned rifles offered cheaper alternatives to the expensive double rifles required by the Nitro Express cartridges.

== World War I service ==
In 1914 and early 1915, German snipers were engaging British Army positions with impunity from behind steel plates that were impervious to .303 British ball ammunition. In an attempt to counter this threat, the British War Office purchased 62 large-bore sporting rifles from British rifle makers, including 47 of .450 caliber rifles, which were issued to regiments, some British officers also supplied their own.

On one notable occasion, Richard "Dickie" Cooper brought down three Albatros D.III fighters from Ernst Udet's squadron, Jagdstaffel 15, with his Holland & Holland .450 Nitro Express big-game double rifle. Cooper is recorded as saying: "I aimed well ahead of the leader. He came down like a pheasant, as did the one that followed, and I had time to reload and fire again at the third before he passed over - he also crashed."

== Users ==
Prominent users of the .450 Nitro Express include Agnes Herbert, Arthur H. Neumann, Major Chauncey H. Stigand and Denys Finch Hatton; the latter had a gunsmith rebarrel his .475 No 2 Nitro Express Lancaster double rifle into .450 Nitro Express as it was easier to find ammunition. Famous Ivory Hunter and Game Ranger, Ian Nyschens used a 450 NE 3 1/4” after losing his 450 No.2 3 1/2” in the Zambezi River when his canoe capsized. His 450 NE was given to him by D.C. Lilford. Nyschens finished his career in the Rhodesian Game Department with this rifle. Nyschens’s exploits are described in his book Months of Sun.

== See also ==
- List of rifle cartridges
- List of rimmed cartridges
- 11 mm caliber other cartridges of similar caliber size.
- Nitro Express
