= .375 Flanged Nitro Express =

Rifle cartridge

375 Nitro Express 2 1/2 inch Velopex
- Type: Rifle
- Place of origin: United Kingdom

Production history
- Designed: 1899
- Produced: 1899–present

Specifications
- Case type: Rimmed, straight
- Bullet diameter: .375 in (9.5 mm)
- Neck diameter: .397 in (10.1 mm)
- Base diameter: .456 in (11.6 mm)
- Rim diameter: .523 in (13.3 mm)
- Case length: 2.5 in (64 mm)
- Overall length: 3.1 in (79 mm)

Ballistic performance
| Bullet mass/type | Velocity | Energy |
|---|---|---|
| 270 gr (17 g) | 1,975 ft/s (602 m/s) | 2,340 ft⋅lbf (3,170 J) |
- Test barrel length: 25 inches Sources: Kynoch & Barnes & Amber.

The .375 Nitro Express 2 1/2 inch Velopex , was a nitrocellulose (smokeless) powder cartridge introduced in 1899.

== Overview ==
A hunting cartridge produced for single-shot and double rifles, the .375 Flanged NE is a slightly longer version of the .303 British necked out to .375 caliber. The .375 Flanged Nitro Express should not be confused with the .375 Flanged Magnum, a much longer and more powerful all-round African hunting cartridge.

The .375 Flanged NE is not considered suitable for hunting dangerous game, but is considered a good low velocity medium bore cartridge for woods and plains game with superior performance to the .45-70.

== See also ==
- List of rifle cartridges
- 9 mm rifle cartridges
- Nitro Express
