= Boss & Co. =

Gunmaker in London, England

Boss & Co. Limited
- Type: Limited company
- Industry: Arms
- Founded: 1812; 214 years ago
- Headquarters: Kew, London, England
- Products: Firearms
- Website: bossguns.com

Boss & Co. is an English bespoke gunmaker, established in 1812 by Thomas Boss in London.

== History ==
Thomas Boss previously worked for Joseph Manton, one of the greatest gunmakers of that period, before leaving and starting his own business. Initially he did most of his work for James Purdey, who had already established a name for making only best quality shotguns and rifles. Then he started producing his own branded guns, which were a success.

When Thomas Boss died, the company was acquired in 1891 by John Robertson, a gunmaker who used to work for Boss as an outworker in assembling and finishing guns.

John Robertson, originally a stocker by trade, was responsible for two of the firm's design: in 1909 the Boss low profile over and under shotgun, and in 1894 the Boss single trigger, one of the first reliable single selective triggers.

It was long rumoured that Ernest Hemingway committed suicide with a Boss shotgun, but it was later proven by the authors of Hemingway's Guns that the gun he used was a W&C Scott.

When asked by one of the Robertson family if he had ever considered a Boss, King George VI replied, "A Boss gun, a Boss gun, bloody beautiful, but too bloody expensive!”

The company faced hard times in the late 1980s, and production of the very expensive and labour-costly over and under became greatly reduced. Tim Robertson, the great, great-grandson of John Robertson, joined the firm in 1990 to become the managing director in 1993 after which production increased. In the late 1990s, Tim Robertson announced the firm's first .470 Nitro Express over-and-under double rifle.

At the end of 1999, the Robertson family sold the company to a small group of businessmen, and Tim Robertson left the company. Boss was managed for a short period by Gavin Gardiner, during which time the business moved to new premises in Mount Street in late 2000. The business was sold again in late 2001 to Keith Halsey; the Mount Street shop was closed in 2008 and the company operated only from its factory on Kew Green by Kew Bridge, in West London. Arthur Demoulas acquired the business in 2015.
