= Holland & Holland =

Gun manufacturer

Holland & Holland Limited
- Company type: Private
- Industry: Arms
- Founded: 1835; 191 years ago
- Founder: Harris Holland
- Headquarters: St James's Street, London, England
- Products: Firearms; Clothing; Fashion accessories
- Number of employees: 101–250
- Parent: Beretta Holding
- Website: www.hollandandholland.com

Holland & Holland Limited is a British gunmaker and luxury clothing retailer based in London, England, which sells handmade sporting rifles and shotguns. The company holds two royal warrants.

== History ==
Holland & Holland was founded by Harris Holland (1806–1896) in 1835.

Portrait of Harris Holland

Harris Holland was born in 1806 in London. Although accounts of his background are somewhat vague, it is believed that his father was an organ builder, while Harris had a tobacco wholesale business in London. He was successful, and was often seen at various pigeon shoots at important London clubs, as well as leasing a grouse moor in Yorkshire.

Having no children of his own, he took on his nephew Henry Holland as an apprentice in 1861. In 1867 Henry became a partner and in 1876 the name changed to Holland & Holland. Although Henry was a full partner, Harris kept strict control and was the only one who could sign a cheque until he died in 1896.

At first, the guns bore the inscription H.Holland, without an address, and it is probable that these were built in the trade to his design. It is not known when Harris Holland started his own manufacturing, but it is estimated to be in the 1850s. This start makes him very unusual among the London Best makers, as others such as Purdey, Boss, Lang and Lancaster had apprenticed with Joseph Manton, while others such as Beesley, Grant and Atkin apprenticed with Purdey or Boss.

In 1883, Holland & Holland entered the trials organized by the magazine The Field and won all of the rifle categories. This set a new standard of excellence for the competition among English gunmakers. In 1885, patents were granted to Holland & Holland for their Paradox gun, a shotgun with rifling in the front two inches of the barrel.

In 1908, they patented the detachable lock feature with a small lever, for sidelock shotguns. The last major development in the evolution of the sidelock side-by-side gun occurred in 1922, when the H&H assisted-opening mechanism was patented. This gun, the self-opening Royal side-by-side, has been hugely influential in gun-making throughout the world.

In the period after World War II under the leadership of new owner and Managing Director Malcolm Lyell, the company made sorties to India, where guns from the famous collections of the princes and maharajahs were bought back, developing an important market for second-hand pieces. In 1989, all remaining shares in H&H were bought by the French luxury group Chanel. Since then, the factory building, in use since 1898, has been extensively renovated and equipped with modern technology. Guns such as the Royal over & under or side-by-side double-barreled shotguns were improved and reintroduced, and are currently available from 4 bore to .360 inch. A hand-built gun from H&H can cost around £60,000 for a shotgun and close to £100,000 for some rifles, with prices roughly doubling with luxury engraving, and there is a waiting period of 2–3 years between ordering and delivery.

In the 1990s, Holland & Holland started a major expansion programme. The company has a gunroom in Dallas and formerly had additional locations. Its gun room in New York City closed in 2017. Its Moscow gun room closed at some point prior to 2024. The company's London flagship store on Bruton Street has been completely renovated and expanded.

In February 2021, Holland & Holland was acquired by the Beretta Holding group from its previous owner, Chanel.

== Cartridges ==
Cartridges developed by Holland & Holland:

- .240 Apex introduced in 1920, produced in belted and rimmed versions.
- .244 H&H Magnum introduced in 1955.
- .297/250 Rook introduced before 1880.
- .275 H&H Magnum introduced in 1912, produced in belted and rimmed versions.
- .300 Rook also known as the .295 Rook.
- .300 H&H Magnum introduced in 1912, produced in belted and rimmed versions.
- .375 Flanged Nitro Express introduced in 1899.
- .375 H&H Magnum introduced in 1912, produced in belted and rimmed versions..
- .400/375 Belted Nitro Express introduced in 1905.
- .400 H&H Magnum introduced in 2003.
- .500/450 Nitro Express introduced in the late 1890s.
- .465 H&H Magnum introduced in 2003.
- .500/465 Nitro Express introduced in 1907.
- .600/577 Rewa introduced in 1929.
- .700 Nitro Express introduced in 1988.

== See also ==
- James Purdey & Sons
- John Rigby & Company
- Westley Richards
