= .500 Nitro Express =

UK large hunting rifle cartridge

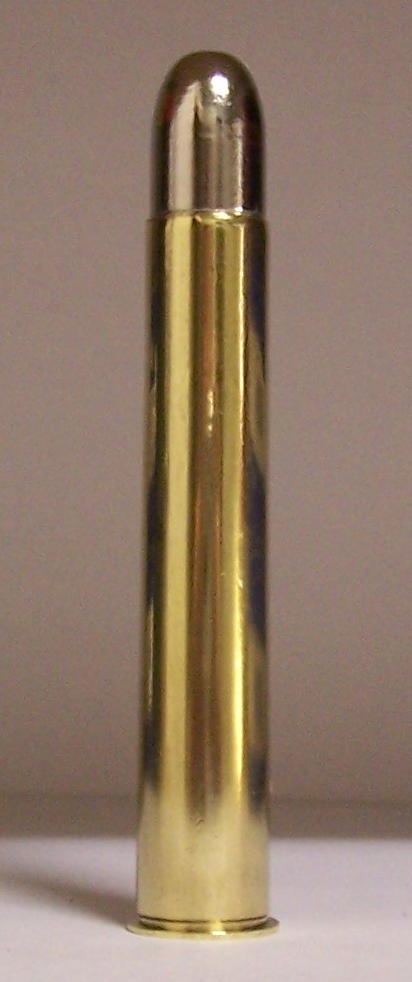
- .500 Nitro Express round
- Type: Rifle
- Place of origin: United Kingdom

Production history
- Designer: Westley Richards
- Designed: 1890
- Produced: 1890–present

Specifications
- Parent case: .500 Black Powder Express
- Case type: Rimmed, straight
- Bullet diameter: .510 in (13.0 mm)
- Neck diameter: .532 in (13.5 mm)
- Base diameter: .574 in (14.6 mm)
- Rim diameter: .655 in (16.6 mm)
- Rim thickness: .040 in (1.0 mm)
- Case length: 3.00 in (76 mm)
- Overall length: 3.75 in (95 mm)
- Case capacity: 138.0 gr H_{2}O (8.94 cm^{3})
- Rifling twist: 1-15 in (381 mm)
- Primer type: Boxer
- Maximum pressure: 40,000 psi (280 MPa)

Ballistic performance
Bullet mass/type	Velocity	Energy
570 gr (37 g) (factory load, cordite)	2,150 ft/s (660 m/s)	5,851 ft⋅lbf (7,933 J)
440 gr (29 g) (Lyman 515141)	1,560 ft/s (480 m/s)	2,378 ft⋅lbf (3,224 J)
570 gr (37 g) (smokeless, Kynoch)	2,150 ft/s (660 m/s)	5,851 ft⋅lbf (7,933 J)
- Sources: Barnes & Amber 1972

The .500 Nitro Express (13×76mmR) is a rifle cartridge designed for hunting large and dangerous game animals in Africa and India. This cartridge was primarily designed for use in double rifles though various single shots were produced on the Farquarson action and at least one major company (Heym) produced it in bolt-action configuration. It was commonly available in two lengths: a 3.00 in (76 mm) and a 3.25 in (83 mm) version.

== History and origins ==
The nomenclature .500 Nitro Express refers to one of three specific loading of the .500 Express case. The other loadings are now called (for the sake of clarity) the .500 Black Powder Express (BPE) and .500 Nitro for Black Powder (Nitro for BPE). The names given to these loadings are of more modern origin to help one differentiate between them. The original cartridge was simply known as the .500 Express. The cartridge is one of the original Express cartridges which originated in the black powder era and made the transition into the smokeless powder era.

The .500 Black Powder Express, as the name indicates was designed for use with black powder. It is unknown as to who or which company originally designed the cartridge except that it was designed sometime in the 1860s in the United Kingdom. Several manufacturers of firearms produced rifles and loaded ammunition for the cartridge type, however, significant differences and variations existed between manufacturers. For the most part, due to the relatively low working pressures of these rifles and ammunition, there was little to no danger associated with the use of these cartridges in a particular rifle.

The .500 Nitro for Black Powder cartridge used the same general case type as the .500 Black Powder Express but was loaded with cordite instead of black powder and appeared on the scene sometime in the 1890s. The cartridge was intended for firearms designed to fire the .500 Black Powder Express and pressures were kept low enough to operate safely in these older black-powder firearms yet provided a substantial increase in performance over the black-powder–loaded cartridge.

Cordite, which was invented in 1889, gave cartridges a greater performance envelope than black powder at the expense of pressure. Rifles that were designed for use with cordite cartridges required stronger actions that were able to withstand the significantly higher pressures to take advantage of the increase in performance offered by cordite. As the working pressure of the .500 Nitro Express cartridge was significantly higher than the black-powder cartridge, variations between manufacturers of the same ammunition would result in damage to the firearms and injury to the shooter. For this reason, there is an acknowledged standard between manufacturers for the .500 Nitro Express cartridge but not for the earlier black-powder cartridge.

Since cordite contained guncotton (nitrocellulose) and nitroglycerine, cartridges loaded with this formulation were often prefixed by "nitro" as a means of differentiation. The suffix "Express" denotes the comparatively higher velocity of the cartridge drawing from the analogy of the express trains from that period of time.

After World War II, as many of the colonies of the United Kingdom gained independence the popularity of the Nitro Express cartridges began to wane. Renewed interest in dangerous game hunting in Africa has in turn renewed the interest in the Nitro Express cartridges, including the .500 Nitro Express.

Both the 3.00 in (76 mm) version and the 3.25 in (83 mm) version of the cartridge are loaded to the same performance level.

== Design and specifications ==
The large capacity of the .500 Express case is due to the cartridge originally being designed to use black powder as a propellant. The 3.00 in (76 mm) case has a case capacity of 138 grains of H_{2}O (8.96cm^{3}) while the 3.25 in (83 mm) case has a capacity of 158 grains of H_{2}O (10.30cm^{3}).

Both the CIP and SAAMI regulate the 3.00 in (76 mm) version of the cartridge, but not the 3.25 in (83 mm) version.

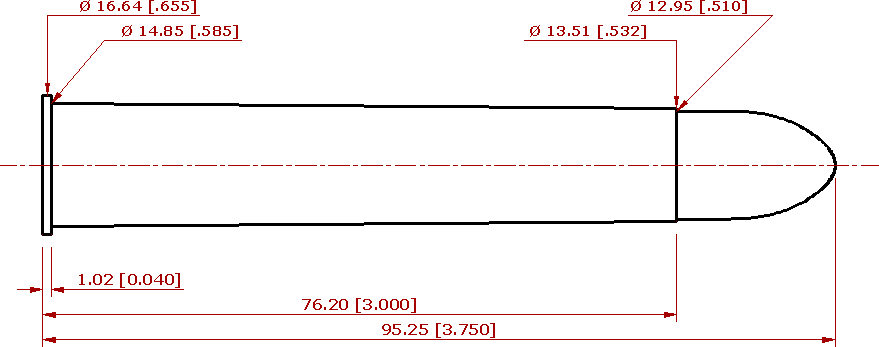

The CIP recommends a 7 groove barrel with a twist rate of 1:15. The barrel is to have a groove Ø of 13.00 mm (0.512 in) and a bore Ø of 12.70 mm (0.500 in) with a groove width of 3.61 mm (0.142 in). Maximum average peak pressure for the cartridge is 2,800 bar (41,000 psi) for the 3.00 in (76 mm) version of the cartridge. While the CIP does not regulate the 3.25 in (83 mm) version of this cartridge this cartridge is loaded to a lower pressure of 2,700 bar (39,000 psi). Except for case length and overall length, the 3.25 in (83 mm) version has similar dimensions as the 3.00 in (76 mm) cartridge.

== Performance ==
The .500 Nitro Express provided a leap in stopping power and performance over its black powder rivals. The .500 Nitro Express was loaded with jacketed bullets giving it far better results against dangerous game than the .500 BPE or Nitro BPE. Furthermore, the bullets had better sectional density which taken together with the fact that the bullet was jacketed, provided far greater penetration on dangerous game such as Cape buffalo and African elephant.

A Comparison of .500 Express Cartridge Loadings
Cartridge	Bullet	Muzzle Velocity	Muzzle Energy	Comments
.500 Black Powder Express	440 gr (29 g)	1,500 ft/s (460 m/s)	2,198 ft⋅lbf (2,980 J)	Original black-powder load. Similar to the .50-140 Sharps/Winchester
.500 Nitro for Black Powder	440 gr (29 g)	1,900 ft/s (580 m/s)	3,528 ft⋅lbf (4,783 J)	Kynoch nitro load for BP rifles.
.500 Nitro Express	570 gr (37 g) FMJ/SP	2,150 ft/s (660 m/s)	5,850 ft⋅lbf (7,930 J)	Kynoch NE load
Values from various sources reflecting factory loading for each cartridge type.

When compared to the then more popular .450 Nitro Express, the .500 Nitro Express fires a heavier bullet with about a 25% greater cross-sectional area and similar sectional density at an equal velocity. The typical .500 Nitro Express generates about 20% more energy than the .450 Nitro Express cartridge. The .500 Nitro Express is considered to be superior to the smaller caliber Nitro Express cartridges in killing power.

The .500 Nitro Express cartridge produces substantial recoil. Factory ammunition typically produce 85 ft⋅lbf (115 J) of recoil energy at a recoil velocity of 23.5 ft/s (7.2 m/s) using a 10 lb (4.5 kg) rifle which is similar to the recoil of the .458 Lott fired in an 8 lb (3.6 kg) rifle.

Performance Characteristic .500 Nitro Express Ammunition
Cartridge	Criteria	Muzzle	25-yard (23 m)	50-yard (46 m)	75-yard (69 m)	100-yard (91 m)	125-yard (114 m)	150-yard (140 m)	175-yard (160 m)	200-yard (180 m)
Hornady 570 grains (37 g) DGS/DGX	Velocity	2,100 ft/s (640 m/s)	2,033 ft/s (620 m/s)	1,967 ft/s (600 m/s)	1,902 ft/s (580 m/s)	1,839 ft/s (561 m/s)	1,777 ft/s (542 m/s)	1,717 ft/s (523 m/s)	1,658 ft/s (505 m/s)	1,601 ft/s (488 m/s)
Hornady 570 grains (37 g) DGS/DGX	Energy	5,581 ft⋅lbf (7,567 J)	5,229 ft⋅lbf (7,090 J)	4,895 ft⋅lbf (6,637 J)	4,578 ft⋅lbf (6,207 J)	4,279 ft⋅lbf (5,802 J)	3,996 ft⋅lbf (5,418 J)	3,730 ft⋅lbf (5,060 J)	3,479 ft⋅lbf (4,717 J)	3,244 ft⋅lbf (4,398 J)
Hornady 570 grains (37 g) DGS/DGX	Bullet Drop	−1 in (−2.5 cm)	0.1 in (0.25 cm)	0.6 in (1.5 cm)	0.6 in (1.5 cm)	0 in (0 cm)	-1.3 in (-3.3cm)	−3.2 in (−8.1 cm)	−5.9 in (−15 cm)	−9.4 in (−24 cm)
Rifle sighted in 1 inch (2.5 cm) above bore axis

The trajectory of the .500 Nitro Express is similar to that of the .30-30 Winchester cartridge with a 170 gr (11 g) Flat Nose bullet. The Hornady DGX and DGS ammunition which has the performance characteristics of typical .500 NE ammunition has an MPBR (maximum point blank range) of 197 yd (180 m). For these reasons, the .500 Nitro Express should be considered a short range cartridge.

== Sporting usage ==
The .500 Nitro Express was designed as a hunting cartridge for use against large and heavy dangerous game such as Cape buffalo, rhinoceros, and African elephant. The 570 gr (37 g) bullet has excellent sectional density which is required for work against dangerous game out to 110 yd (100 m) and provides adequate penetration for the hunting of thick-skinned, dangerous game. Some professional African hunters have complained that the taper of the 570 gr (37 g) bullet toward the nose increases the incidents of bullet "fishtailing" during penetration, causing the bullet to not maintain a straight course. The 570 gr (37 g) solid bullet is used mainly for elephants. Still, it is also used in some situations for Cape buffalo and rhinoceros when the extra penetration provided by these non-expanding bullets is desired. Mated with the 570 gr (37 g) solid bullet, the .500 Nitro Express has become the quintessential elephant cartridge on the African savanna. The round nose soft point 570 gr (37 g) bullet is used on most other game species.

Unlike some of the more modern cartridges such as the .460 Weatherby, the .500 Nitro Express is not considered too powerful for use against the big cats. The big cats do not require the more stoutly constructed bullet as they are neither heavy-bodied nor have thick skin, and are best served with a more lightly constructed bullet that is capable of expanding quickly such as the 570 gr (37 g) A-Square Lion Load or the Woodleigh 450 gr (29 g) Soft Nose.

In North America, cartridges such as the .500 Nitro Express see little use as no North American game species requires the cartridges in the same class as the .500 Nitro Express. Nevertheless, there can be no doubt that the cartridge would be a very effective stopper against a charge by one of the large bears or bison should it be carried in the field.

== Ammunition ==
During the heyday of hunting, every major manufacturer of British dangerous game rifles produced ammunition for the .500 Nitro Express rifles. However, by the 1960s only Kynoch was left producing ammunition. Due to the lack of interest, Kynoch ended production of the Nitro Express cartridges in 1970.

As African hunting safaris became more popular from the 1990s onward there has been a renewed interest in the cartridge. Whereas before mainstream American ammunition manufacturers hardly ever showed an interest in the British big bore ammunition, demand created by American hunters spurred on companies such as A-Square, Federal, and Hornady to offer ammunition for these cartridge types. Eley, which had purchased Kynoch, licensed the brand name to Kynamco in Suffolk in the United Kingdom. Kynamco now offers British sporting cartridges including the Nitro Express cartridge for sale using the Kynoch brand name. Norma of Sweden has also begun to offer this cartridge for sale.

== See also ==
- .577 Nitro Express
- .600 Nitro Express
- 12 mm caliber
- 13 mm caliber
- Rimmed cartridges
- List of cartridges by caliber
- List of rifle cartridges
- Nitro Express

== Sources ==
- Barnes, Frank C., ed. by John T. Amber. Cartridges of the World. Northfield, IL: DBI Books, 1972. ISBN 0-695-80326-3. Specifically:
  - ".500 Nitro Express (3")", pp. 231 & 236.
  - ".458 Winchester", p.64.
