= Eley Limited =

Ammunition manufacturer in England

- Type: Private
- Industry: Ammunition
- Founded: 1820s
- Founder: William and Charles Eley
- Headquarters: Sutton Coldfield, Birmingham, England
- Products: Firearms cartridges, percussion caps, smokeless powder
- Website: eley.co.uk

Eley Limited is a British manufacturer of firearms cartridges. Historically the company has produced a broad variety of ammunition, but today specialises in .22 Long Rifle cartridges for competitive target shooting. At the 2020 Tokyo Olympics, six of the twelve medals for cartridge rifle and pistol were won using Eley ammunition.

== History ==
Founded as Eley Brothers by Charles and William Eley in London in the 1820s, the company purchased the patent rights to the "wire cartridge" in the spring or early summer of 1828. The patent for "wire cartridge" was issued by the English Patent Office on 28 November 1827 to Joshua Jenour under Patent No. 5570. Jenour had been born in Fleet Street, London in 1755 and had previously been the owner and manager of the Daily Advertiser, a London newspaper. The 'wire cartridge' consisted of a wire cage which held the shot together during the first stages of its flight.

In 1828, Charles and William Eley established a factory in Charlotte Street (London), later moving to Bond Street (London). Initially, Charles Eley had been the primary owner of the concern and the original wire cartridges had only the name of Charles Eley on them. The initial attempts to sell the Eley Wire Cartridge went poorly and Charles Eley withdrew from the business. During the mid-1830s, William Eley reinvigorated the company and began selling the "Improved Patent Wire Cartridges".

In 1837, the company added percussion caps to their range and though William was killed in an explosion in 1841, his three sons helped carry on the business. His eldest son William Thomas forged an alliance with Samuel Colt, the two patenting a skin cartridge for use in the latter's revolvers.

By 1860, they were making pinfire shotshells and first listed them for sale in The Ironmonger & Metal Trades Advertiser. On 13 April 1861 William Thomas Eley took out a patent for an improvement to the pinfire shotshell. The key aspect to this patent was to better fix the cap into the case and prevent the pin from flying out of the case on detonation.

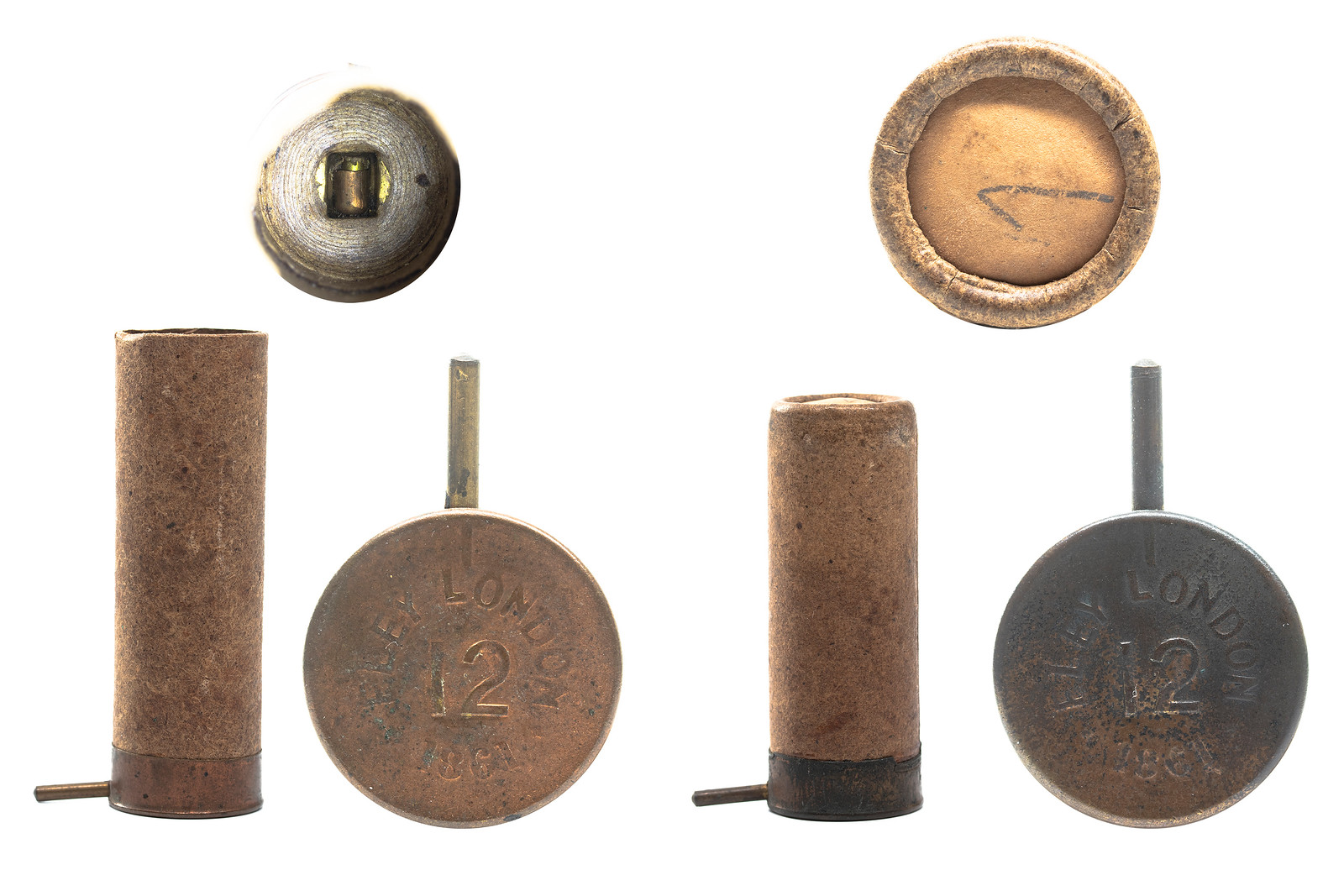
Eley 1861 Pinfire Shotshells

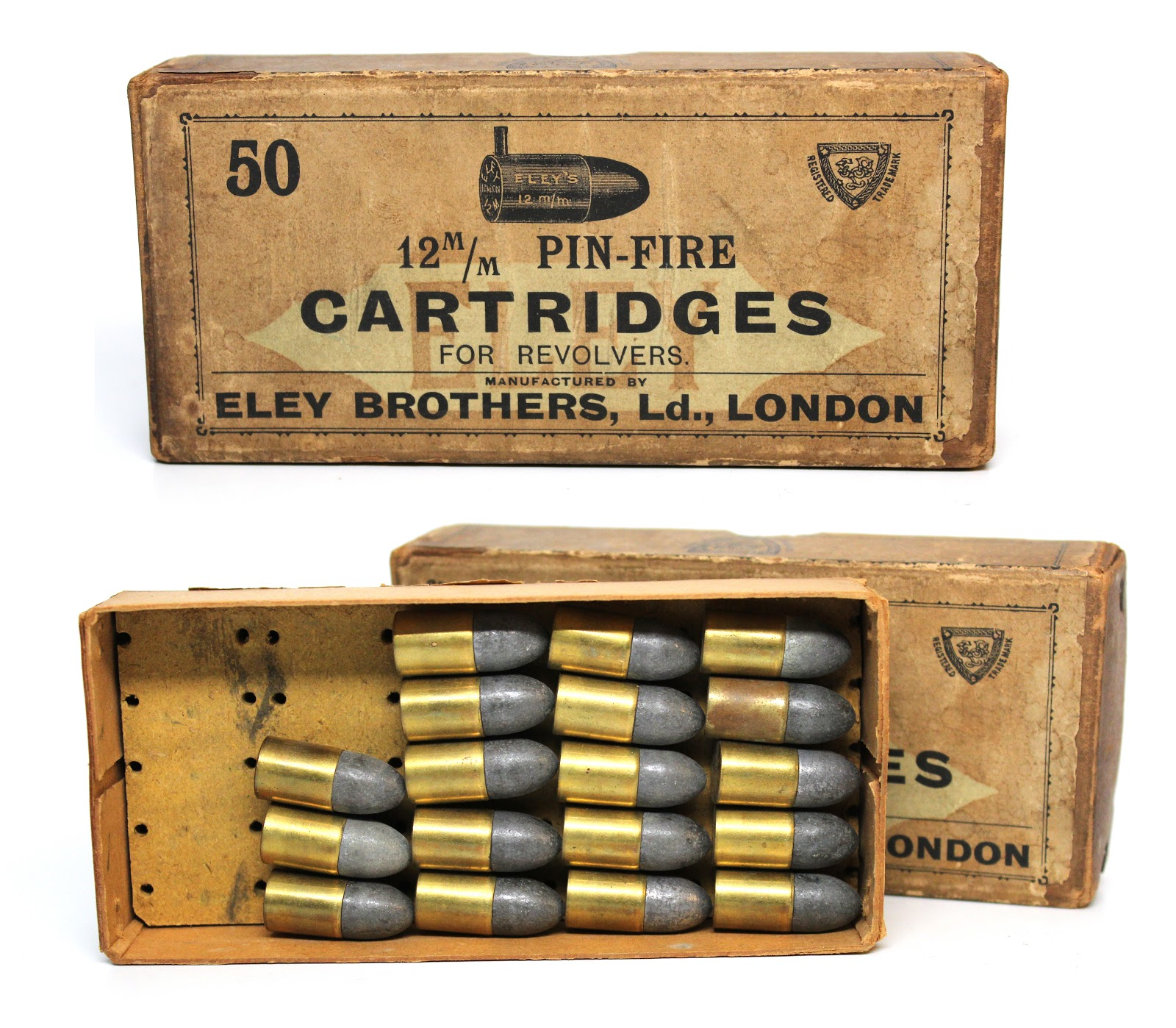
Box of 12mm Eley Pinfire Cartridges

The growth of business accompanied by moves to the Grays Inn Road in 1864, and by the development of the Boxer cartridge designed by Colonel Boxer - Chief Superintendent of the Royal Arsenal, Woolwich - and adopted by the government in 1866.

In 1874, they went public to fuel expansion, but lost momentum after 1881 when William Thomas died. His brothers remained in control until 1901 but shareholders accused them of running it as a private company. Nevertheless, innovations included smokeless powder, and in the 1890s, 400 types of cartridges were produced. They had established a factory at Tile Kiln Lane, Edmonton, London by 1865.

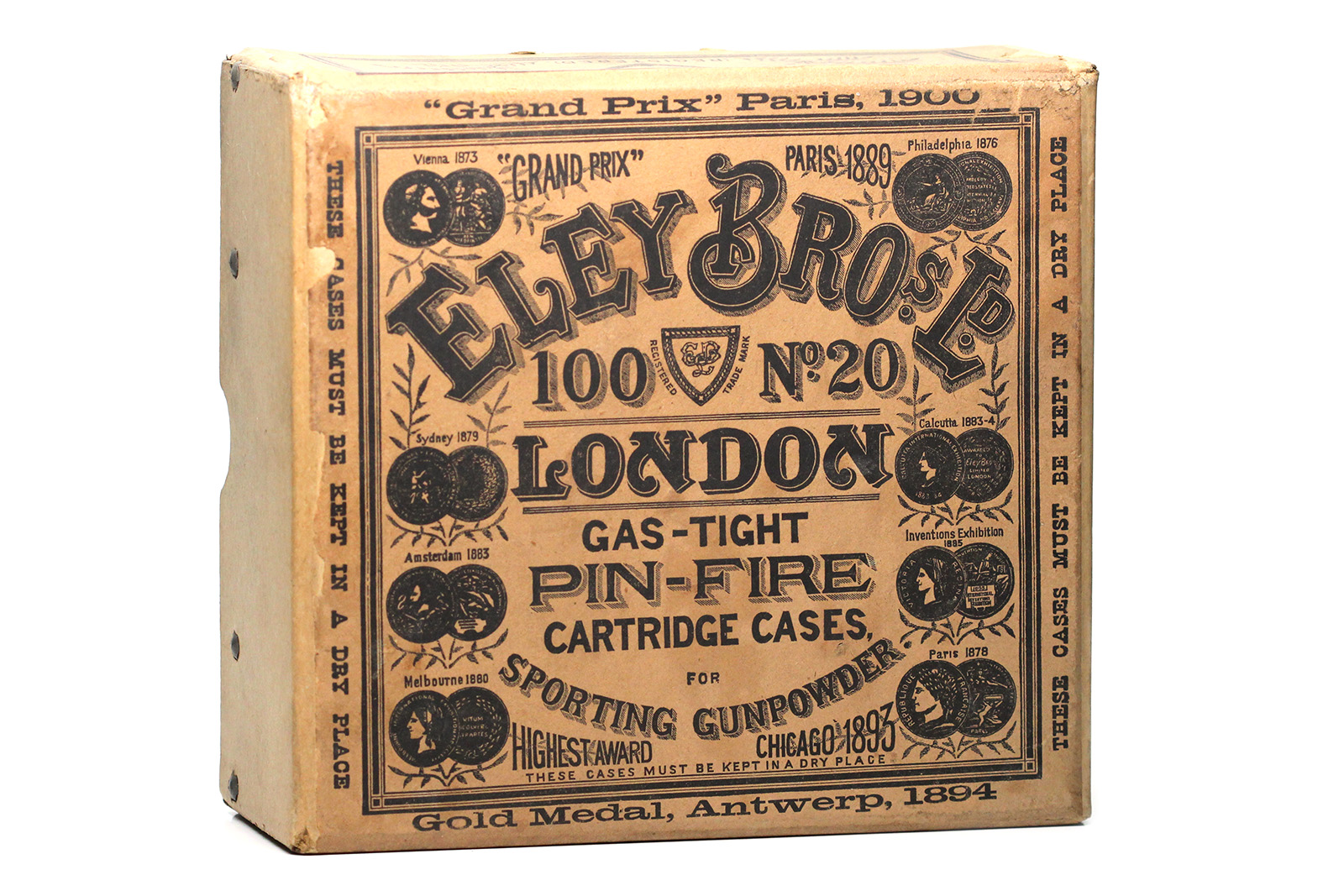
Eley 20 Gauge Pinfire Shotshell Box

In 1894, the company transferred production to enlarged premises at Angel Road which included a tramway to its wharf on the nearby River Lee. Twice the War Office removed the company from their Approved List of suppliers due to poor quality .303 British ammunition, much of it returned from abroad as unusable. Moreover, poor facilities meant the company had to buy in components, unlike their competitors.

In 1895 an explosion killed three female workers.

Another explosion occurred in 1900 killing two workmen and the works manager. The directors squabbled amongst themselves, and in 1906 the mostly female workforce went on strike when their wages were cut, with the Board of Trade appointing an arbitrator. A leading ballistics expert F.W. Jones, was brought in to improve matters and built a 107 ft (32.6m) shot tower in 1907. The factory was ill-adapted to mass production - it produced 209 million .303 cartridges in World War I compared with 2,373 million at Kynochs, Birmingham factory - but its specialised skills made it ideal for innovation, such as the preparations of munitions for aircraft.

After the war, Eley, along with other firms, became part of Explosive Trades Ltd, soon part of Nobel Industries. Many Belgians had been billeted in Edmonton as refugees and many, as elsewhere, worked in the armaments industry. This led to natural links between the two countries, and in the 1920s Eley went into partnership with Fabrique Nationale (FN), buying out the Belgian firm of Cartoucherie Russo - Belge. However, the need for ammunition had slumped, and the Angel Road factory closed in 1921, all production being transferred to Nobel's factory in Waltham Abbey.

In 1926 the Eley business was bought from Nobel by IMI industries.

In 1951 Eley released the "Tenex" .22 cartridge for Olympic target competition.

=== Eley Prime ===
Eley is noted for its 1979 development of the Eleyprime process. Rimfire ammunition was historically primed by measuring activated liquid primer into the cases where it would dry. Spilt or surplus primer could dry into an explosive residue on factory machinery. Various manufacturers have experienced fatal accidents over the years, often related to primer handling. The Eleyprime process measures dry, unactivated primer into the case where it is activated by adding water, meaning activated primer is only present inside cases and the factory does not handle activated compound in bulk. As an additional benefit, dry materials can be metered more accurately than liquids, meaning the process has the potential to be more consistent than liquid metering. The process has been licensed to other manufacturers as it safer for workers. Eley received the 1988 Queen's Award for Technology for this innovation.

== Recent history ==
The shot tower at the former Edmonton site was demolished in the late 20th century. The area today is known as the Eley Industrial Estate.

The business later moved to a new purpose-built factory in Sutton Coldfield. The shotgun cartridge business was separated out as "Eley Hawk" and sold to Spanish firm Maxam Explosives. Although a separate company, Eley Hawk continues to operate from the same site as a tenant in Eley Limited's factory.

In 2014, Eley became independent as a result of a management buyout backed by private equity firm LDC (part of Lloyds TSB).

In 2017, via their US subsidiary Eley Inc, the company acquired their US importer and batch-testing partner Killough Shooting Sports. This gave the company more direct control over distribution in the US and brings the batch-testing facility provided by Killough "in house". KSS also owned the American Rimfire Association, which Eley also took control of as part of the acquisition.

In December 2022, LDC divested Eley to Lunele Limited.

== Ammunition developed by Eley Brothers ==
- .450 No 2 Nitro Express in 1903.
- .360 No 2 Nitro Express in 1905.
- .475 No. 2 Nitro Express after 1907.

== Literature ==
- An Edmonton Boy. Terry Webb. ISBN 1-903981-00-X. 2000 Published by Biograph. Page 68: "One of the most famous factories on that estate was Eleys which used to make shotgun cartridges. It had a massive great tower and hot lead was dropped from the top of the tower through the water and it turned into little lead balls. I never saw it but that's how they made lead shot; they would drop from the height of this specially constructed tower"
- In his Sherlock Holmes story The Adventure of the Speckled Band, Arthur Conan Doyle has Holmes tell Dr. John H. Watson that an "Eley's No. 2" is "an excellent argument with gentlemen who can twist steel pokers into knots."
- In Alan Wilson's Sherlock Holmes pastiche story The Adventure of the Tired Captain, included in The Further Adventures of Sherlock Holmes, edited by Richard Lancelyn Green, when Holmes asks Watson if he has his revolver, the doctor replies, "I have my Eleys."
- 'Eley Cartridges - a history of the silversmiths and ammunition manufacturers' by CW Harding. ISBN 1-904057-91-8. Published in 2006 by Quiller Press. Eley Cartridges traces the history of the Eley name from its agricultural roots, through its rise to the major role it played in the silver manufacturing trade of London and its production of ammunition both in London and Birmingham. Eley Cartridges
