= .470 Nitro Express =

Rifle cartridge

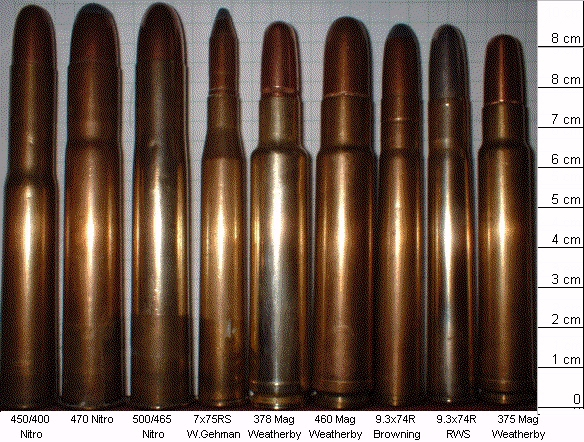
- Type: Rifle
- Place of origin: England

Production history
- Designer: Joseph Lang
- Designed: 1907
- Produced: 1907–present

Specifications
- Parent case: .500 Nitro Express 3 1/4 in
- Case type: Rimmed, bottlenecked
- Bullet diameter: .474 in (12.0 mm)
- Land diameter: .467 in (11.9 mm)
- Neck diameter: .504 in (12.8 mm)
- Shoulder diameter: .531 in (13.5 mm)
- Base diameter: .573 in (14.6 mm)
- Rim diameter: .655 in (16.6 mm)
- Rim thickness: .040 in (1.0 mm)
- Case length: 3.25 in (83 mm)
- Overall length: 3.98 in (101 mm)
- Case capacity: 146.0 gr H_{2}O (9.46 cm^{3})
- Rifling twist: 1-20 in
- Primer type: Boxer
- Maximum pressure: 39,160 psi (270.0 MPa)
- Maximum CUP: 35,000 CUP

Ballistic performance
Bullet mass/type	Velocity	Energy
500 gr (32 g) SP, FMJ	2,150 ft/s (660 m/s)	5,133 ft⋅lbf (6,959 J)
- Source: "Cartridges of the World"

The .470 Nitro Express / 12.7x83mmR is a rifle cartridge developed by Joseph Lang in England for dangerous game hunting in Africa and India. This cartridge is used almost exclusively in double rifles. It is in wide use in the Southern and Central-East African region, favoured by hunting guides, primarily while out for hunting Cape buffalo and elephant.

== Overview ==
The .470 NE was originally designed by Lang's as a replacement for the .450 Nitro Express, after the .450 NE was banned in several British colonies including India in 1907 (its bullets could theoretically be removed from loaded rounds for use by natives in stolen .577/.450 Martini Henry rifles). Due to the heavy bullet and powder charge, the gun has significant recoil but this is mitigated by the low velocity, resulting in recoil being delivered as a strong push rather than a violent blow. Rifles chambered for this cartridge tend to be heavy double-gun style, and are typically quite expensive.

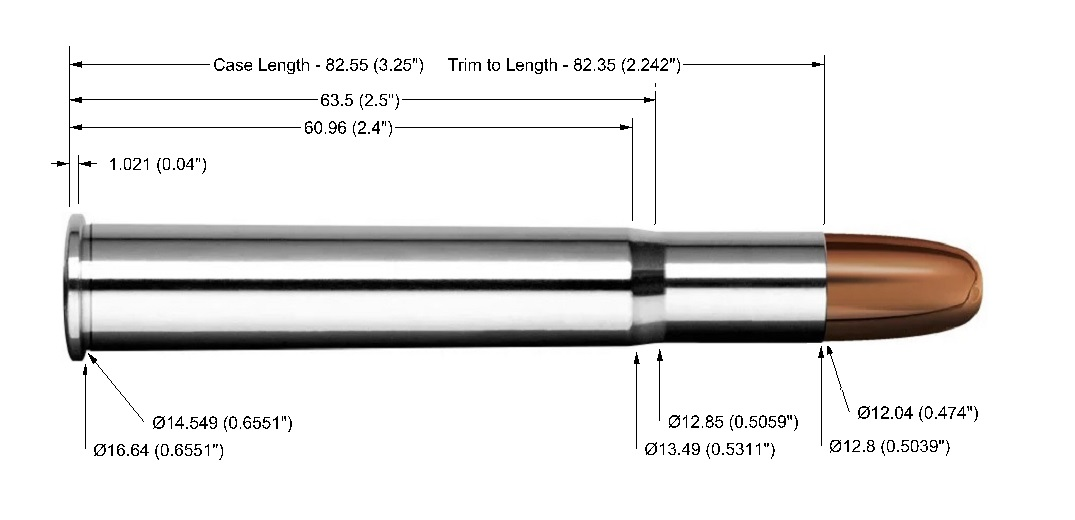
Dimensions of the .470 Nitro Express.

The .470 NE continues to be the most popular of all the Nitro Express cartridges. Ammunition and components are readily available.

== Handloading ==
Like other 'dangerous game' cartridges, ammunition is expensive compared with standard hunting cartridges, often costing up to 10 times more per shell than typical cartridges such as the .30-06. Because of this many shooters choose to handload the .470 NE. Brass can be obtained from a variety of sources, and like most reloading components varies in quality. Lighter loads for practice can be created that are more enjoyable and cheaper to shoot.

== In popular culture ==
Author and adventurer James S. Gardner provides a realistic, detailed account of the capabilities of a Nitro Express during an ill-fated safari, and again in a graphical account of a desperate firefight against men and a helicopter in his book, The Lion Killer.

== See also ==
- List of rifle cartridges
- 11 mm caliber other cartridges of similar size.
- Nitro Express
