= John "Pondoro" Taylor =

Irish big game hunter, poacher and author

John Pondoro Taylor
- Born: John Howard Taylor; January 6, 1904; Dublin, Ireland, United Kingdom
- Died: March 31, 1969 (aged 65); London, England, United Kingdom
- Occupations: Hunter, ivory poacher, author

John Howard "Pondoro" Taylor (1904–1969) was an Irish big-game hunter and ivory poacher. Born in Dublin as the son of a surgeon, he developed an urge to go to Africa and become a professional hunter. Taylor mainly hunted for his own account and had little interest in guiding clients. His parents paid for his passage to Cape Town. In Africa he experimented extensively with different types of rifles and calibers which made him an expert in big game rifles. He is credited with developing the Taylor KO Factor, and authored several books. John Taylor died in 1969 in London.

== Biography ==
Although Taylor used various firearms for his work as a hunter, he preferred the expensive, British double rifles over anything else, especially when tackling dangerous game. His fondness for such cartridges as the .450/.400 Nitro-Express, .500/.465 Nitro-Express and .375 Holland & Holland Magnum are expressed again and again in his writing. Of the 450/.400 he says,

It has ever been one of my favorites. I have used it extensively on all kinds of African game from elephant down with the greatest possible satisfaction.

Speaking of the .375 Holland & Holland Magnum he writes,

Undoubtedly one of the deadliest weapons in existence. I've had five of these rifles—two doubles and three magazines—and have fired more than 5,000 rounds of .375 Magnum ammunition at game. One of them accounted for more than 100 elephant and some 411 buffalo, besides rhino, lions and lesser game.

He also found favour with the smallest of cartridges, writing: "With a scope-sighted .22LR I could walk from the Cape to Cairo and not miss a meal."

Having hunted for over thirty years on the African continent, Taylor estimated he had killed over 1,200 elephants, the majority of them illegally.

As an alleged homosexual, Taylor was persecuted in Africa in his later years there and was eventually forced by local authorities to leave Africa due to his continued poaching offences. Taylor found little work in England due to his alleged homosexuality. Taylor's final years were spent in poverty.

== Books ==
Among the books he wrote include:

- Big Game and Big Game Rifles (1948)
- African Rifles and Cartridges (1948)
- Pondoro: Last of the Ivory Hunters (1955)
- Shadows of Shame (a novel) (1956)
- Maneaters and Marauders (1959)

== See also ==
- List of famous big game hunters
