= Double rifle =

Sporting rifle with two parallel barrels

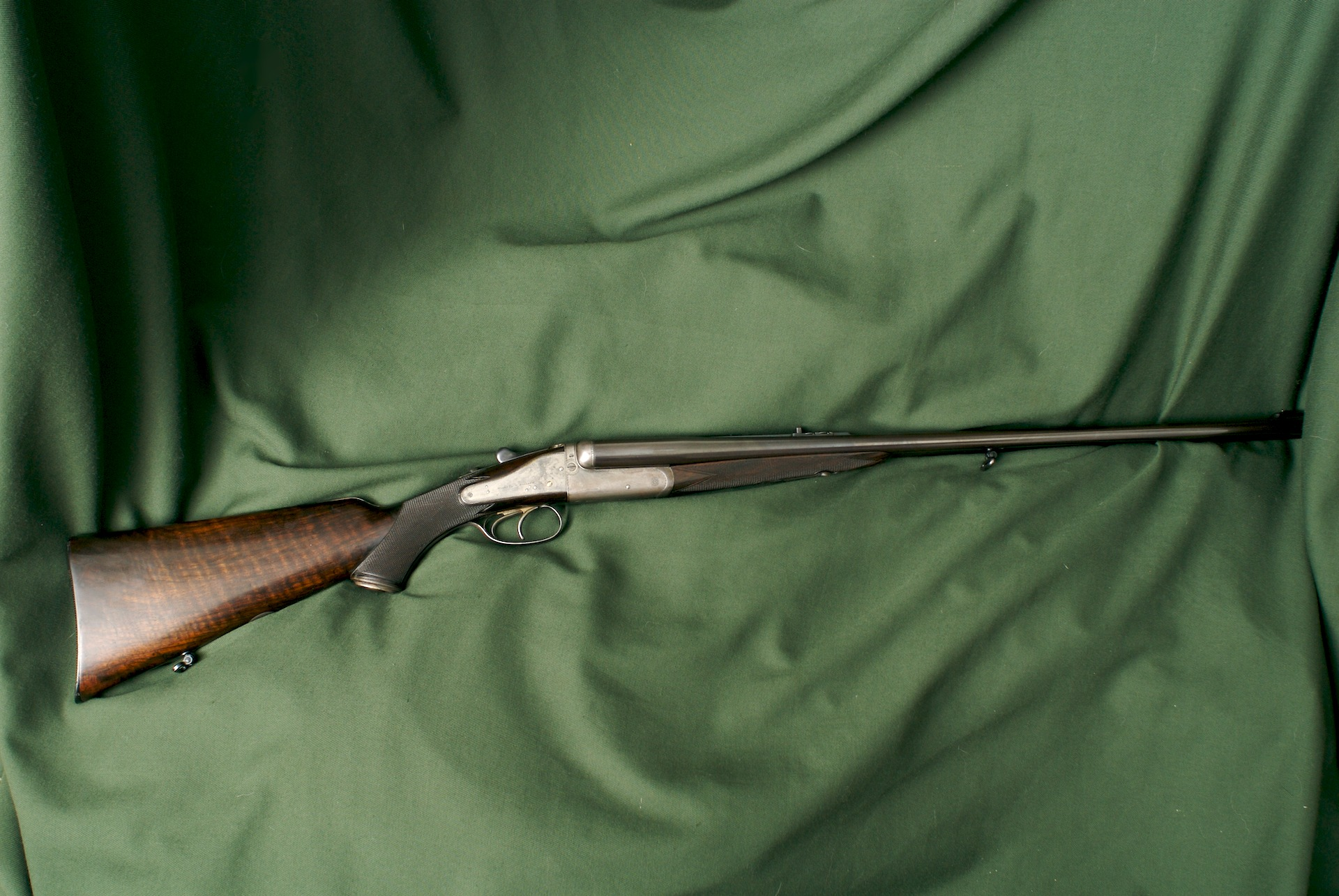
Holland & Holland double rifle in .375 H&H Magnum.

The double rifle, also known as a double-barreled rifle, is a rifle with two barrels mounted parallel to each other that can be fired simultaneously or sequentially in quick succession. Commonly used in big game hunting, primarily in Africa and Asia, the double rifle is a sporting weapon with very little military heritage.

== Design ==
The double rifle is usually handcrafted and is considered by many to be the pinnacle of sporting rifle design. It is not designed for long-range accuracy but instead for the security of an immediate second shot. Double rifles are similar to double-barreled shotguns.

=== Action ===
As with double-barrelled shotguns, modern double rifles are all made with either sidelock or boxlock actions, although occasionally old hammer rifles can be found. The majority of double rifles have been built on the boxlock actions as it is a simpler design with fewer moving parts that can fail. Consequently, it has an outstanding reputation for reliability. The sidelock action, with its lockwork operating behind the main action body, has exceptional inherent strength and as a result could be built on slimmer action sizes in proportion to the calibre, although it is far more labour-intensive to manufacture and so more expensive.

Most double rifles manufactured today, especially those designed for dangerous game, are manufactured with selective ejectors which greatly speeds reloading. However many old hunters preferred non-ejector rifles, feeling that with practice they could reload just as quickly, these rifles can still be found and usually attract a slightly lower price.

=== Barrels ===
Double rifles can come in two barrel configurations, over-and-under designs (usually abbreviated as O/U) where the two barrels are mounted vertically one on top of the other, or side-by-side (usually abbreviated as SxS) where the two barrels are mounted horizontally next to each other.

For dangerous game hunting, side-by-side rifles are usually preferred. This is for a number of reasons but predominantly because the barrels of an over-and-under gun must be pivoted much farther down to clear the lower barrel for reloading.

During manufacture the barrels of double rifles require "regulation" to ensure the bullet paths from both barrels are aimed at a common point of aim. This can be done to ensure either the bullets 1) parallel each other closely at all practical ranges, or 2) converge at a given range, beyond which they begin to diverge. Because of the need to regulate a rifle to a specific loading of its chambered cartridge, once regulated a double rifle cannot satisfactorily shoot bullets of different weights or velocities, as it usually affects the accuracy. The process of regulating a double rifle’s barrels is complex and can be time-consuming, significantly adding to the cost of the rifle.

=== Sights ===
Whilst many modern double rifles are fitted with telescopic sights, the need for fast target acquisition in the face of dangerous game led to the development of the "Express" iron sights. Express sights feature a very wide and shallow rear V, usually with a white line marking the bottom of the V. The purpose of express sights is to allow for well-aimed shots over moderate ranges when there is time for careful sighting and to allow the rifle to be pointed like a shotgun to stop the charge of a dangerous animal at very short range when there is little time for aiming.

=== Calibres ===
Double rifles have been produced in all calibres from .220 in (5.6 mm) to .700 in (17.8 mm). Traditional British double rifle calibres include the Rook rifle, Black Powder Express and rimmed Nitro Express families of cartridges and many of these can still be obtained today. European makers tend to chamber their double rifles in metric rimmed calibres developed by European firms, although British and American cartridges are offered.

Variants known as cape guns are of a similar design, but one of the barrels on a cape gun is a smoothbore for firing shotgun shells, while the other is a rifled barrel. This allows for hunting a wider variety of game with the same weapon. A long gun combining at least one rifled barrel and (usually) one smoothbore barrel is a combination gun, and some rare examples have up to five different calibres in one firearm; what sets the cape gun apart is that the barrels are arranged horizontally, while most combination guns with two barrels arrange them vertically.

== History ==
The development of the double rifle has always followed the development of the double-barrelled shotgun, the two are generally very similar but the stresses of firing a solid projectile are far greater than shot. The first double-barrelled muskets were created in the 1830s when deer stalking became popular in Scotland. Previously single barrelled weapons had been used but, recognising the need for a rapid second shot to dispatch a wounded animal, double-barrelled muskets were built along the same format as double-barrelled shotguns already in common use.

These first double-barrelled weapons were black powder, smoothbore muzzleloaders built with either flintlock or percussion cap ignition systems. Whilst true rifling dates from the mid-16th century, the invention of the express rifle by James Purdey "the Younger" in 1856 allowed for far greater muzzle velocities to be achieved through a rifled longarm, significantly improving the trajectory and as such greatly improving the range of these rifles. These express rifles had two deep opposing grooves which were wide and deep enough to prevent the lead bullets from stripping the rifling if fired at high velocities, a significant problem previously.

These muzzle-loading rifles came in a large variety of calibres, the most common calibres for medium thin-skinned plains and deer-sized game were .400 in (10.2 mm), .450 in (11.4 mm), .500 in (12.7 mm), .577 in (14.7 mm), and 12 bore (.729 in (18.5 mm)). For larger thick skinned type game 10 bore (.775 in (19.7 mm)), 8 bore (.835 in (21.2 mm)), 6 bore (.919 in (23.3 mm)), and 4 bore (1.05 in (27 mm)) were used, the last being a specialist elephant hunting calibre. Whilst most of these calibres could be purchased with rifling, the 4 bore and the 6 bore were rarely rifled, as the increased friction from the rifling caused excessive recoil.

Various experimental breech loaders had been in existence since the 16th century, however developments such as the Ferguson rifle in the 1770s and early pinfire cartridges in the 1830s had little impact on sporting rifles due to their experimental nature, expense and the extraordinary strength and reliability of the percussion muzzleloader. In 1858, Westley Richards patented the break-open, top leaver breech-loading action, whilst a useful development these early break-open designs had a great deal of elasticity in the action and upon firing they sprung open slightly, a problem that gradually worsened with repeated firing and with more powerful cartridges. Many gunmakers tried various methods to rectify this problem, all to little avail until Westley Richards invented the "Dolls head" lock in 1862 which greatly improved rigidity, this was followed by James Purdey's under-locking mechanism in 1863 and W.W. Greener's "Wedge fast" system in 1873, finally the basic break-open action known to this day had the strength required to meet the stresses of large-bore projectiles. By 1914, triple, quadruple and even quintuple-locking designs could be found in various proprietary actions.

In 1861, the centrefire rifle cartridge was invented, and quickly a large number of blackpowder centrefire cartridges were developed in the same calibres as their muzzle loading forebears, including the .450/400 Black Powder Express, the extremely popular .450 Black Powder Express, the .500 Black Powder Express, and the .577 Black Powder Express, all with various case lengths. The first brass 10-bore, 8-bore and 4-bore cartridges were not developed until 1870, their arrival spelling the end of the muzzle-loading era.

Until this time all double rifles had external hammers whose fall struck the mechanism that fired the cartridge, however, attempts to remove them were well underway. The first "hammerless" action of significance was invented by Thomas Murcott in 1871, known as "The Mousetrap", it was a complex design but it sold in significant numbers. In 1875, Westley Richards employees William Anson and John Deeley patented the "Anson & Deeley" hammerless boxlock action, and in 1878 the Birmingham gunmakers W&C Scott & Son invented the basic sidelock action which was so successful it was immediately adopted by Holland & Holland.

By 1900, the boxlock and sidelock hammerless actions had largely superseded the hammer rifles and, with the addition of ejectors and assisted opening, the basic design of the double rifle has changed little to this day. Incidentally, it was Westley Richards who invented the first reliable safety catch for doubles, ejectors, the single selective trigger and the special extractors that enabled rimless cartridges to be used in double rifles, all features found in modern double rifles.

In 1898, John Rigby & Company loaded the .450 Black Powder Express with smokeless cordite creating the .450 Nitro Express, the first Nitro Express cartridge,; this was to have a profound impact on sporting cartridge development and the double rifle was to become synonymous with Nitro Express cartridges. Now in its final form and chambering modern Nitro Express cartridges, the British double rifle entered its golden age at the turn of 20th century and it was to last for the next three decades, with the birth of the white hunter and professional hunting safari industry in East Africa.

After the Second World War, a combination of increased labour costs and a shrinking British Empire saw an end to the demand for handcrafted sporting rifles and the double rifle was largely supplanted by the bolt action rifle. It was not until the 1980s and the emergence of the big game hunting industry in Southern Africa that production of double rifles resumed at a steady rate, driven largely by demand from American sportsmen.

== Use ==
In Africa, hunting with the Nitro Express double rifle remains extremely popular, although unaffordable for the majority of hunters.

In Europe, the double rifle remains reasonably popular in Austria, France, Germany, Italy, Scandinavia, Spain, and Eastern Europe for hunting wild boar, bear, stag, and moose.

== Double rifle makers today ==
- Blaser
- Boss & Co.
- Chapuis Armes
- Davide Pedersoli
- FAMARS
- Hartmann & Weiss
- Heym
- Holland & Holland
- James Purdey & Sons
- John Rigby & Company
- Krieghoff
- Merkel
- Sauer & Sohn
- Szecsei & Fuchs
- Verney-Carron
- Westley Richards

== See also ==
- Express (weaponry)
- Nitro Express
