= List of big-game hunters =

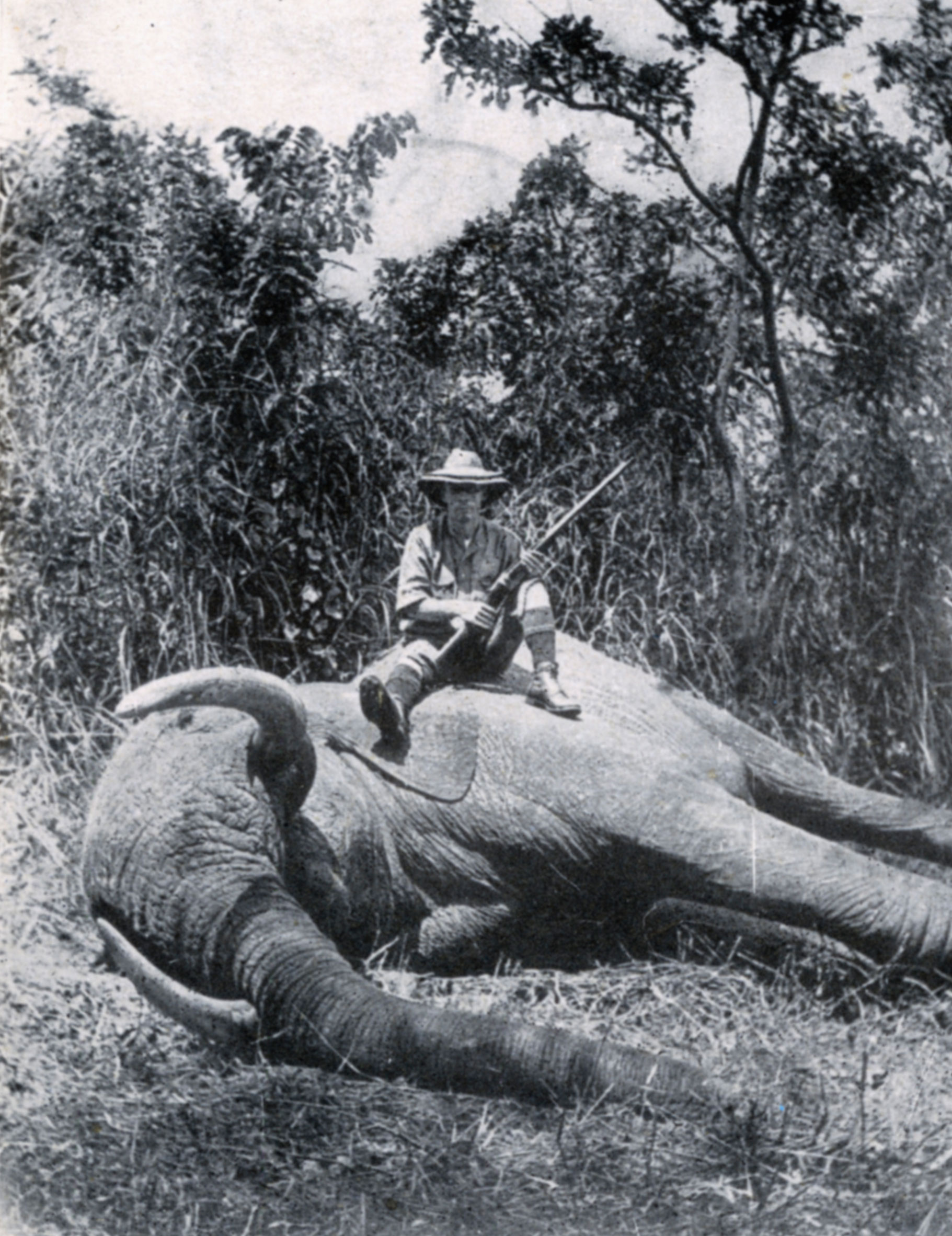
James H. Sutherland with dead elephant.

This list of big-game hunters includes sportsmen and sportswomen who gained fame largely or solely because of their big-game hunting exploits. The members of this list either hunted big game for sport, to advance the science of their day, or as professional hunters. It includes brief biographical details focusing on the type of game hunted, methods employed, and weapons used by those featured.

== Africa ==
=== Bunny Allen ===
Frank Maurice "Bunny" Allen (1906–2002) was an English-born professional safari guide in Kenya. Born in Buckinghamshire, as a young boy Allen learnt to poach game, gaining the nickname "Bunny" for his skill at snaring rabbits. In 1927 Allen followed his older brothers to Kenya. Managing a farm, Allen would take guests of the owner on shoots, bringing him to the attention of Bror von Blixen-Finecke and Denys Finch Hatton. Allen soon became one of Finch Hatton's guns on shoots, including the Prince of Wales' 1928 safari. Rising to captain in the 6th King's African Rifles during World War II, after the war Allen started his own safari business and by the 1950s was considered the best and the most expensive safari operator in Kenya. Allen was also regularly employed by film studios when filming in Africa. He is rumoured to have had love affairs with Grace Kelly and Ava Gardner. Allen predominantly used a .470 Nitro Express double rifle from John Rigby & Company to hunt big game.

=== Yank Allen ===
George "Yank" Allen (1867–1924) was an American-born professional lion hunter in Northern and Southern Rhodesia in the early 20th century. Allen was originally a Texan cowboy who reputedly left the United States as a result of a gunfight, first travelling to South America before arriving in Southern Africa in 1900. Renowned as an eccentric, Allen was quite contemptuous of lions, never referring to them as lions but instead calling them "dawgs" that did not roar but instead "bawled". Allen supplemented his income by hunting lion for the protection of cattle, charging farmers £7 per lion. In 1912 Allen became a professional lion hunter when the Southern Rhodesian cattle enterprise Liebig's hired him to protect their herd of 20,000 cattle, paying him £10 per lion plus transport and labour. Allen always hunted alone, not trusting his native help, and his favorite rifles for lion hunting were a .303 British service rifle and a .577 Black Powder Express double rifle. At the time of his death he was said to have killed around 300 lions, making him in the opinion of "Pondoro" Taylor one of the most successful lion hunters ever.

=== Major G. H. Anderson ===
Major Gordon H. "Andy" Anderson (1878–1946) was a British soldier, elephant hunter and safari guide. Anderson commenced big-game hunting in 1909 and elephant hunting in 1912, after meeting lifelong friend Jim Sutherland. Over the course of his life Anderson shot between 350 and 400 elephants, his favourite calibres for elephant hunting being the .577 Nitro Express, the .470 Nitro Express and the .318 Westley Richards. From 1921 Anderson also started acting as a professional safari guide, his most notable clients being the Duke and Duchess of York (later King George VI and Queen Elizabeth the Queen Mother) in 1924 and (in partnership with Denys Finch Hatton) the Prince of Wales (later King Edward VIII) and his brother Prince Henry, Duke of Gloucester in 1928. In 1934 Anderson was one of the founding members of the East African Professional Hunter's Association. In 1946 he wrote his autobiography, African Safaris, which was published posthumously.

=== William Charles Baldwin ===
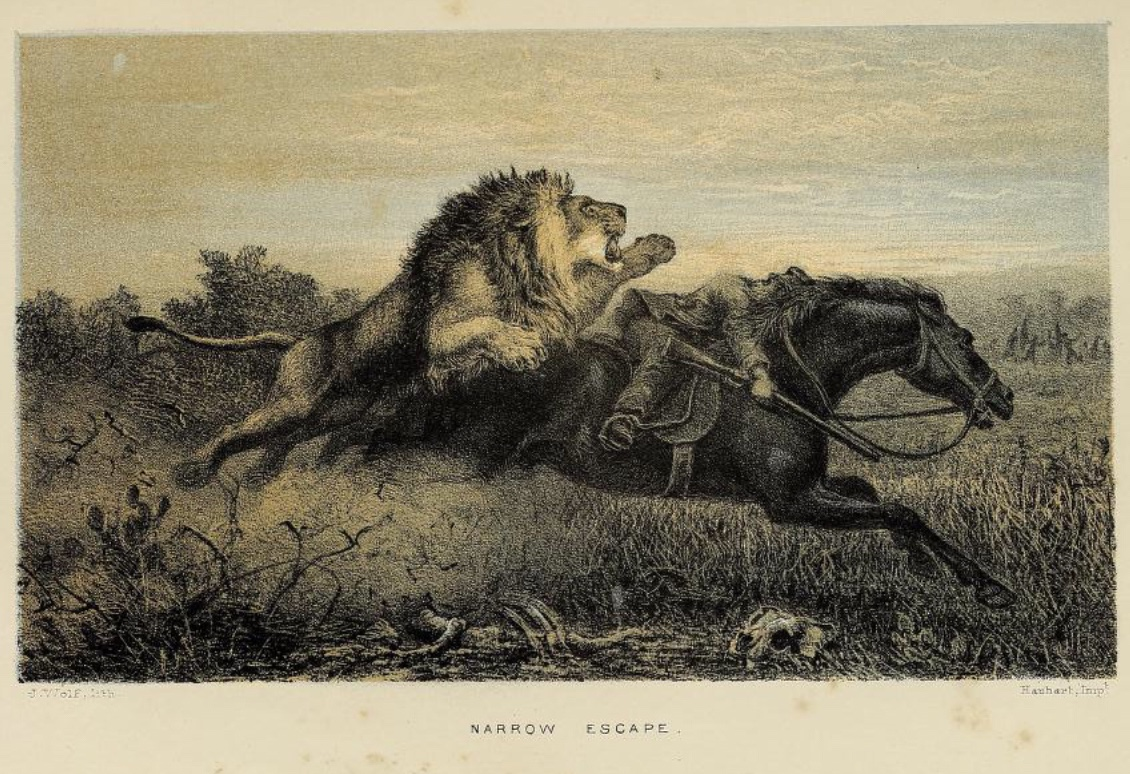
Baldwin attacked by a lion from African Hunting.

William Charles Baldwin (1826–1903) was an English-born big-game hunter in 19th-century South Africa. Born in Leyland, Lancashire, from a young age Baldwin had an innate love of sports, dogs and horses. From the age of six he spent two days a week on a pony following the local harriers. After school Baldwin tried being a clerk in a shipping office and a farmer but in 1851 he packed his guns, rifles, saddles and seven deerhounds, purchased from Earl Fitzwilliam's gamekeeper at great expense, and sailed for South Africa to hunt elephant. Baldwin hunted from Zululand to the Zambezi and west to Lake Ngami. He claimed to be the second white man to set eyes on the Victoria Falls in 1860. Baldwin hunted mainly mounted on horseback with local hounds, the deerhounds having proved of little use. He returned to England in 1861, never returning to Africa. In 1863 he published a memoir African hunting: from Natal to the Zambezi.

=== Deaf Banks ===
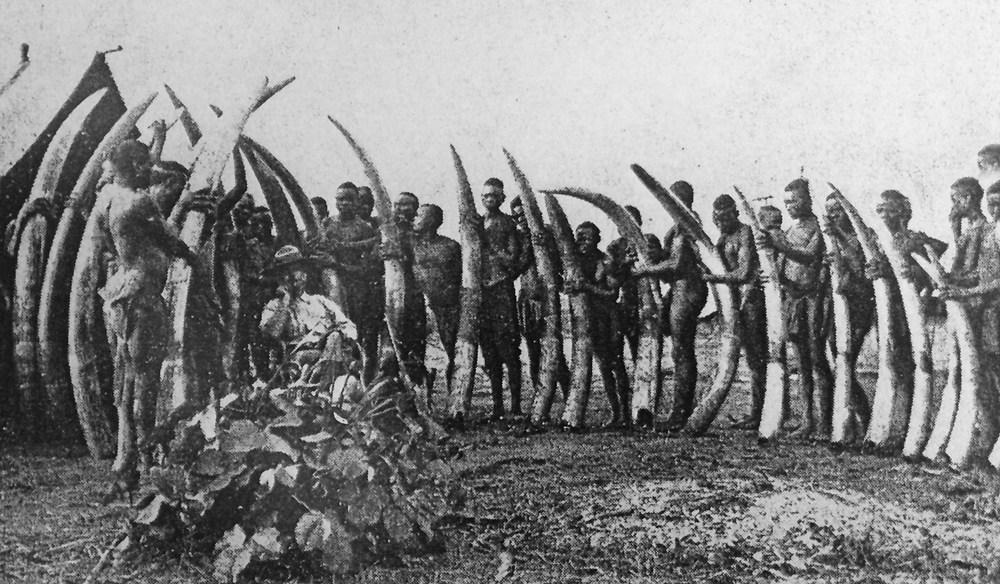
Banks with ivory from elephant shot in the Lado, 1905.

Frederick Grant "Deaf" Banks (1875–1954) was variously a trader, government official, planter, elephant hunter and game ranger in Uganda. Born in London, but raised in Christchurch, New Zealand, Banks went to Africa in 1896 at the age of 21. Initially working with a coastal merchant, Banks moved into coffee planting and then set off on a prospecting trip to the Congo before he took to big-game hunting. Banks did most of his hunting in Uganda Protectorate and the Lado Enclave, and is said to have killed over 1,000 elephants in his life, despite being almost completely deaf. Banks did most of his elephant hunting with a 6.5×54mm Mannlicher–Schönauer in open country and a .577 Nitro Express double rifle for cover.

=== W. D. M. "Karamojo" Bell ===
Walter Dalrymple Maitland "Karamojo" Bell (1880–1954) was a Scottish, soldier, fighter pilot, adventurer and elephant hunter. Arriving in Africa in 1896, and after hunting man-eating lions for the Uganda Railway and then serving in the Boer War, from 1902 Bell hunted elephant in Kenya, Uganda, Abyssinia, Sudan, the Lado Enclave (one of the few to do so there legally), French Ivory Coast, Liberia, French Congo, and the Belgian Congo. During his hunting career, Bell shot 1,011 elephants and numerous other game including 25 lions, 16 leopards, 4 white rhinoceros, 67 black rhinoceros and between 600 and 700 buffalo. Bell was an exceptional shot who preferred to hunt with smaller calibre bolt-action rifles rather than with large bore double rifles; around 800 of his elephants were killed with a 7mm Mauser. Bell published three books on his time in Africa, The Wanderings of An Elephant Hunter in 1923 and Karamojo Safari in 1949, and Bell of Africa which was published posthumously. He also wrote a number of magazine articles for Country Life and American Rifleman. Bell is considered one of the most successful of Africa's professional elephant hunters.

=== Bror Blixen ===
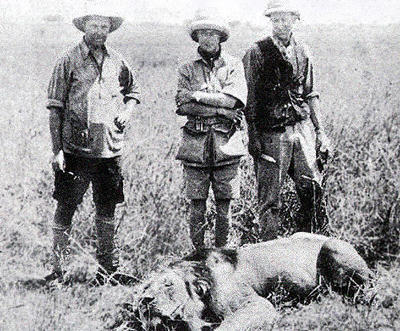
Blixen (left) with Denys Finch Hatton (right) and Edward, Prince of Wales, 1928.

Baron Bror Fredrik "Blix" von Blixen-Finecke (1886–1946) was a Swedish baron, writer and professional safari guide. Blixen arrived in Kenya in 1913 with his new wife, his second cousin Karen von Blixen-Finecke. The marriage did not last, Blixen was a renowned philanderer, and after their separation in 1922 he was forced to flee from his creditors and hide in the bush. Close friend Sir Robert Coryndon intervened and referred some friends to Blixen to go on safari, and throughout the 1920s and 1930s he guided safaris throughout East Africa, notable clients included Edward, Prince of Wales and Ernest Hemingway. Blixen returned to Sweden in 1938, where he died eight years later at the age of 59. Blixen hunted extensively with a .600 Nitro Express double rifle by W. J. Jeffery & Co., in 1937 he published an autobiography in Swedish, African hunter. He is fictionalised by Klaus Maria Brandauer in the Oscar-winning film Out of Africa.

=== Peter Capstick ===
Peter Hathaway Capstick (1940–1996) was an American big-game hunter and author. Born in New Jersey, after a short career as a Wall Street stockbroker, Capstick headed to Latin America shortly before his thirtieth birthday to become a professional hunter. After several years he returned to New York City where he arranged professionally guided hunting trips. Making his first trip to Africa in 1968, Capstick later became a professional hunter and game ranger in Zambia, Botswana, and Rhodesia. Publishing articles about hunting and adventure from the late 1960s, Capstick published his first book Death in the Long Grass in 1977, establishing his reputation as a writer.

=== Cigar ===
Cigar was a 19th-century hottentot elephant hunter. Originally a jockey in Grahamstown, Cigar first hunted elephant for William Finaughty in 1869, keeping half of the ivory from elephants he shot. Finaughty stated Cigar was an excellent horseman and a fair shot, but his fear of elephants prevented him from having any success at that time. Frederick Selous first met Cigar in 1872 when Cigar agreed to take Selous elephant hunting; by then he had completely overcome his fear of elephants. At the time Cigar employed two native hunters and three porters; Selous described Cigar as a slightly built active man with wonderful endurance and a very good game shot who hunted with an old heavy 6 bore muzzleloader. Cigar originally hunted elephant from horseback with Finaughty, but when Selous met him he hunted them on foot due to tsetse flies.

=== Lady Grizel Winifred Louisa Cochrane ===
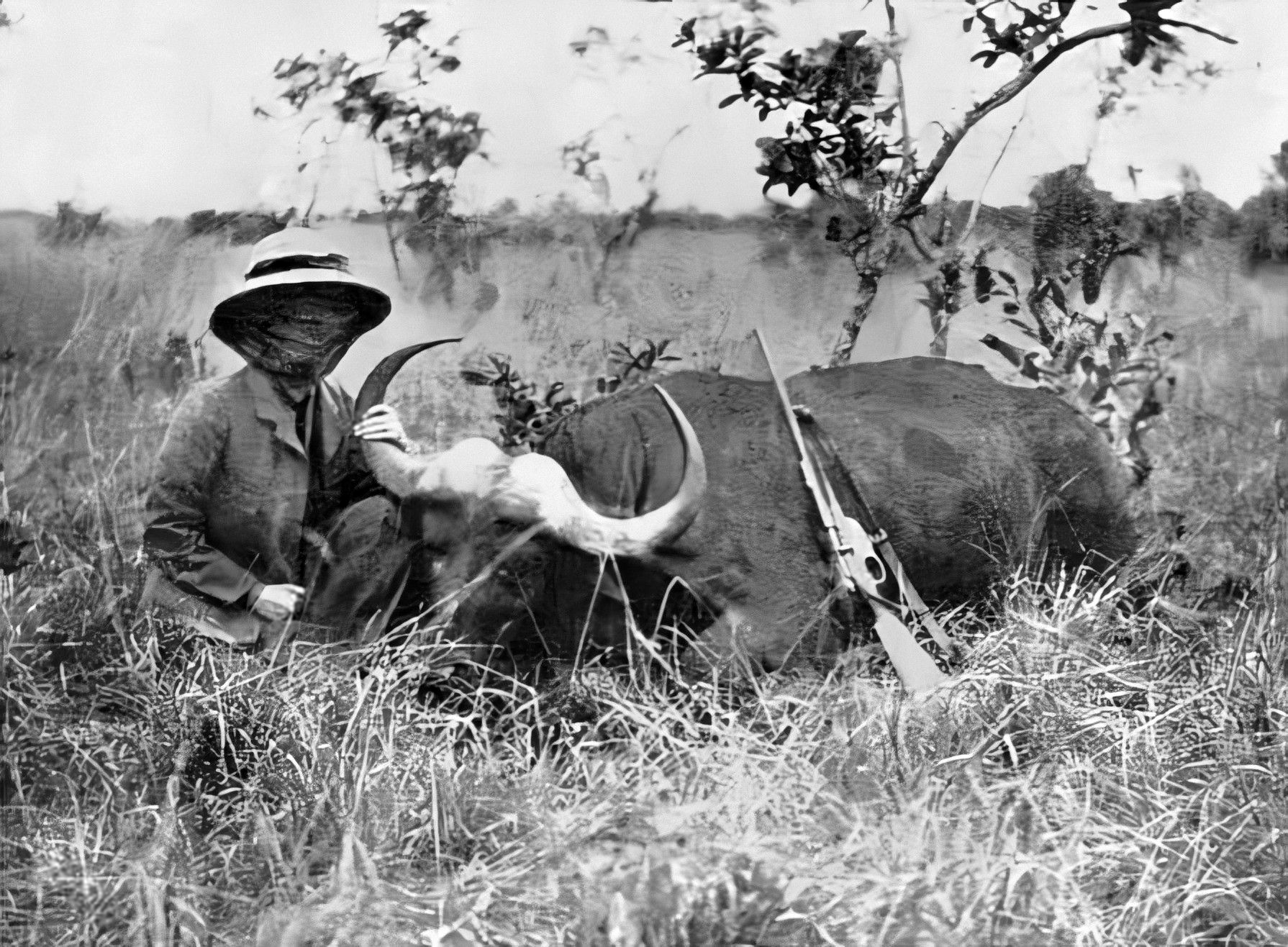
"The woman behind the gun; Lady Grizel Hamilton, with a cape buffalo shot by herself" – 1908

Lady Cochrane or 'Lady Grizel Hamilton' (1880–1977) was a Welsh and Scottish daughter of Winifred, Countess of Dundonald, Douglas Cochrane, 12th Earl of Dundonald and the wife of Lt.-Col. Hon. Ralph Gerard Alexander Hamilton, Master of Belhaven (who was killed in action in WWI). Along with her husband, she was a keen huntress, to which, she'd often travel to Kenya, Africa to embark on her big game hunting. Some of the animals she killed were: hippopotamus, wildebeest, leopard, rhinoceros, waterbuck, and Cape buffalo. Her hunts were extensively covered in popular magazines and newspaper articles.

=== William Finaughty ===
William "Old Bill" Finaughty (1843–1917) was a 19th-century elephant hunter in Southern Africa. Born in Grahamstown, in 1864 at age 21 Finaughty travelled to Matabeleland to trade; chief Mzilikazi was friendly to his party and he witnessed a dance of 25,000 warriors. Shooting his first elephants on that trip, after making further expeditions in 1865 and 1866, Finaughty decided to hunt elephant professionally in 1867, which he did until 1876. Finaughty did all of his hunting from horseback, predominantly with a 4 bore muzzle loader, which fired a 4 oz bullet driven by "a handful of powder", whose recoil would leave his shoulder black and blue after a day's elephant hunting and on a number of occasions knocked him out of the saddle. On one of his last hunts Finaughty used a "newly invented" breech loading rifled 12 bore, and the memory of its recoil still made his eyes water 30 years later. It is believed Finaughty killed over 400 elephants in his life. He retired from elephant hunting when most elephants moved into tsetse fly country, not wanting to risk himself or his horses. In 1913, American Mr G.L. Harrison interviewed Finaughty, and upon his return to the United States he published Finaughty's recollections in The recollections of William Finaughty – elephant hunter 1864–1875.

=== Denys Finch-Hatton ===
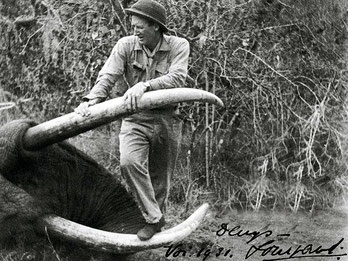
Finch-Hatton with tusker.

The Hon Denys George Finch-Hatton (1887–1931) was an English-born sportsman and professional safari guide in Kenya in the 20th century. The third son of an Earl, Finch Hatton was educated at Eton and Oxford University and arrived in Kenya in 1911. He initially lived a nomadic life which included trading safaris throughout Kenya and Somaliland, during which he spent a lot of time hunting. In 1925 Finch Hatton became a professional safari guide, initially conducting a number of safaris with the veteran professional J.A. Hunter, Finch Hatton's most notable guests were the Prince of Wales (later King Edward VIII) and his brother Prince Henry, Duke of Gloucester in 1928. Finch Hatton hunted with a Mannlicher bolt actioned rifle in 6.5×54mm Mannlicher–Schönauer, a second hand Rigby bolt actioned rifle in .350 Rigby, a Lancaster double rifle that he had converted from .450 No 2 Nitro Express to .450 Nitro Express as it was easier to source ammunition and an Army & Navy 20 bore shotgun. Finch Hatton was the lover of Karen Blixen, their relationship being detailed in her memoir Out of Africa, which she wrote under her pen name "Isak Dinesen".

=== Roualeyn Gordon-Cumming ===
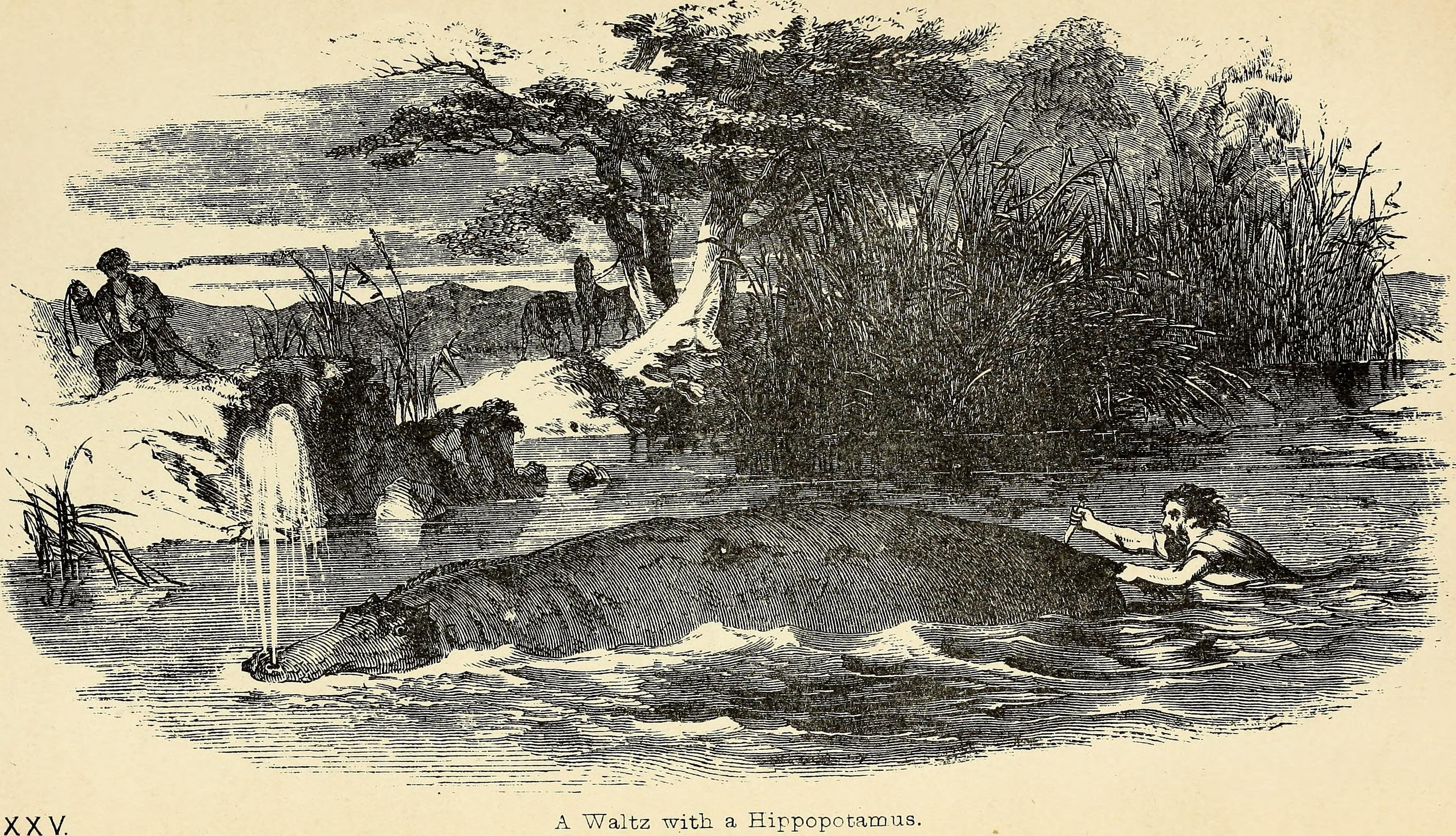
Gordon-Cumming attacking a hippopotamus with a knife.

Roualeyn George "The Lion Hunter" Gordon-Cumming (1820–1866) was a Scottish traveler, sportsman, big-game hunter and author. Growing up in the Scottish Highlands, from a young age Gordon-Cumming distinguished himself for his skill at deer stalking and salmon fishing. Gordon-Cumming briefly held commissions in the Honourable East India Company and later the Cape Mounted Rifles, resigning the latter after several months to take up hunting in Africa. Between 1843 and 1848 Gordon-Cumming hunted chiefly in Bechuanaland and the valley of the Limpopo River, mostly he did so on horseback with the assistance of hounds and always wearing a kilt, both when mounted and when on foot. Gordon-Cumming killed numerous game including lion, leopard, white rhinoceros, black rhinoceros, buffalo, giraffe, various antelope, hippopotamus, a rock python and 105 elephants, his favourite weapon was a 10 bore muzzle loaded 2 groove double rifle made by Dickson of Edinburgh until it burst causing him great lament. In 1850 Gordon-Cumming published an account of his time in Africa, Five years of a hunter's life in the far interior of South Africa.

=== Fred Green ===
Frederick Thomas Green (1829–1876) was a Canadian-born elephant hunter in what are now Namibia and Botswana. He came with his parents and siblings to the Cape Colony in the 1840s, and in the early 1850s made several hunting trips to what is now Botswana from Bloemfontein where his brother Henry Green was British Resident of the Orange River Sovereignty. He later preferred to travel from the west coast, exporting ivory from the port of Walvis Bay.

=== Quentin Grogan ===
Quentin Oliver Grogan (1883–1962) was an English-born big-game hunter in East Africa, and the younger brother of Ewart Grogan. Arriving in Kenya 1905 to assist with his brother's businesses, Grogan instead took to hunting elephant. Hunting widely on Kenya, Uganda and the Belgian Congo, Grogan was one of four hunters to receive a license to hunt in the Lado Enclave, although he remained there to poach elephant once his license expired. In 1909 Grogan guided Theodore Roosevelt's safari when it came to the Lado Enclave to hunt for white rhinoceros. Grogan eventually settled on a farm at Turi in the White Highlands in 1915 and remained there until 1933 when he sold up and moved to South Africa. Grogan shot between 250 and 300 elephant in his life, he tried various rifles on elephant including a .256 Mannlicher, a .280 Ross and a .450 Nitro Express, finally settling on a .318 Westley Richards bolt actioned rifle and a .577 Nitro Express double rifle by Westley Richards.

=== Sir William Cornwallis Harris ===
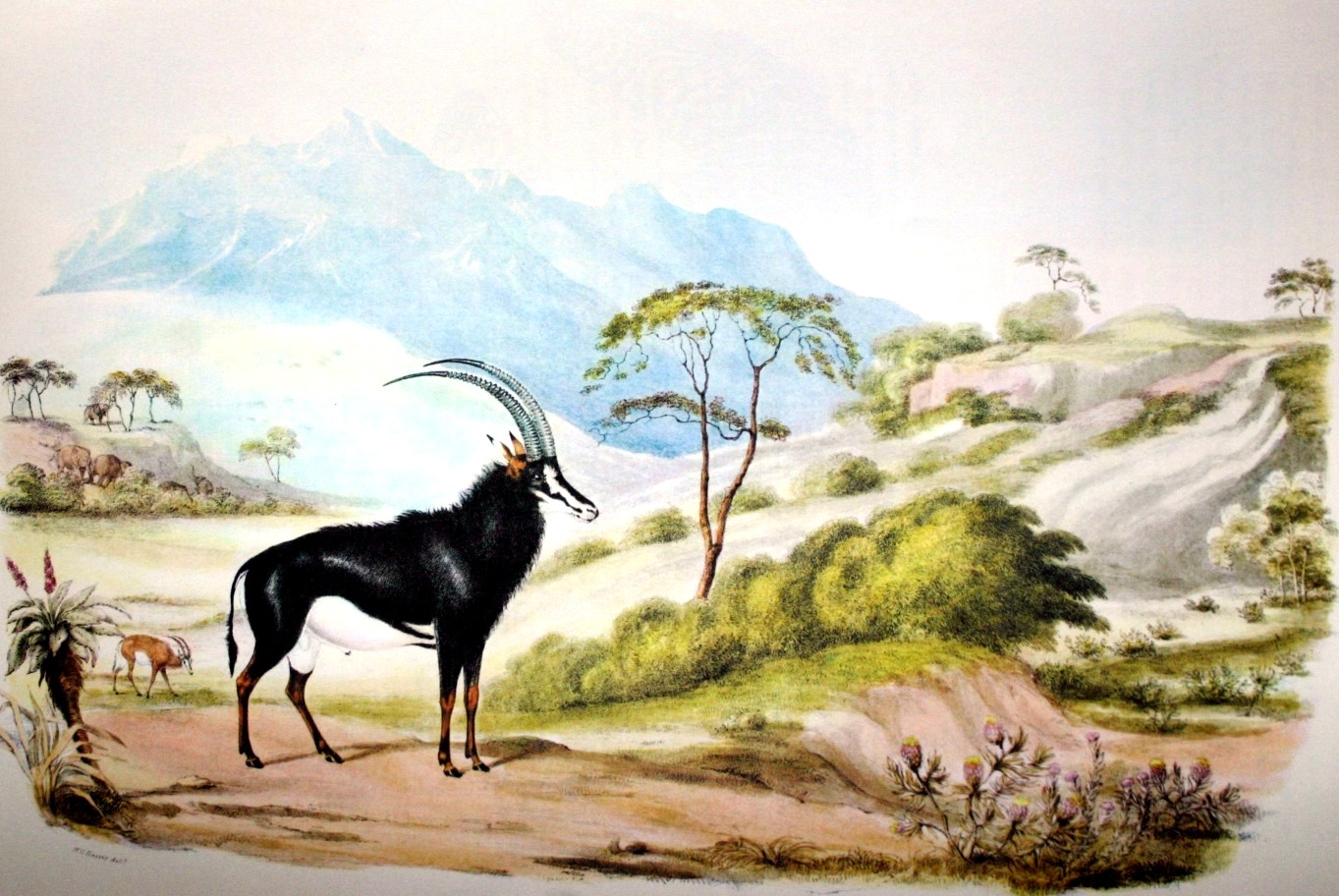
Painting of sable antelope by William Cornwallis Harris from Portraits of the Game Animals of Southern Africa.

Major Sir William Cornwallis Harris (1807–1848) was an English military engineer, artist, naturalist and hunter. Joining the Honourable East India Company in 1825, whilst in India he hunted tigers and blackbuck from elephant back and attempted to hunt lion in Gujarat. In 1836, following health issues, Harris was ordered to southern Africa to rehabilitate, where he went on a five-month safari from the Cape Colony to Matabeleland. During that trip Harris shot elephant, quagga, giraffe, hippopotamus, wildebeest, hartebeast, impala, rhinoceros, waterbuck and giraffe, the ivory from the elephant he shot funded the entire expedition. A naturalist, when not hunting Harris spent part of each day skillfully drawing animals and native Africans, he also collected two complete skulls of every quadruped found in southern Africa, along with a complete skeleton and skin of the sable antelope, which became known as the "Harris buck", these remains were later displayed in the British Museum. In 1838 Harris published an account of his time in southern Africa, The wild sports in southern Africa and in 1840 he published a folio volume of lithographs, Portraits of the game animals of southern Africa.

=== Henry Hartley ===
Henry Hartley (1815–1876) was an English-born 19th-century South African farmer and elephant hunter. Arriving in South Africa aged 4, he initially trained as a blacksmith but in the 1840s he took up farming near Magaliesberg in the Transvaal. From his farm, "Thorndale", Hartley would make annual treks to Matabeleland and further to Mashonaland to hunt elephant in the Zambezi Valley. Mzilikazi and Lobengula liked and trusted him, Mzilikazi called him the "Keeper of the King's Elephants". It is said that Hartley discovered gold in the Hartley Hills (later named in his honour) in 1866 near where he made his annual hunting camp, guiding Karl Mauch back the following year who confirmed the presence of gold, their announcing the discovery led to South Africa's gold rush. In 1869 Hartley escorted Thomas Baines to these goldfields. Hartley did all of his hunting from horseback, it is believed he shot between 1,000 and 1,200 elephant in his life, he eventually died from injuries caused by a rhinoceros collapsing on top of him after he had shot it.

=== J.A. Hunter ===
John Alexander "J.A." Hunter (1887–1963) was a Scottish born Kenyan game control officer, big-game hunter, safari guide, author and conservationist. Moving to Kenya in 1908, Hunter initially gained employment hunting lions for the Uganda Railway and over the next 50 years made a living as a professional hunter, it is believed Hunter killed over 1,400 elephant in his life. For much of his career Hunter was a Kenyan Government game control officer, between 1944 and 1946 he killed over 1,000 rhinoceros on behalf of the government in the Makueni District, the government wishing to clear the area of wildlife to resettle the Kamba people, Hunter later regretted the necessity of the task. An author of a number of books, his 1952 work Hunter was a Book of the Month Club selection the following year and was widely purchased by school libraries throughout the English speaking world in its abridged form African Hunter. In later years Hunter became concerned about the fate of African game and advocated for the establishment of wildlife protection areas. Hunter hunted with a number of rifles, he arrived in Kenya with his father's Purdey shotgun and a .275 rifle whilst later he used a .416 Rigby, a .500 Nitro Express and a .505 Gibbs rifle.

=== Bobby "Iodine" Ionides ===
Constantine John Philip Ionides (1901–1968), known since childhood as Bobby, was born in England and decided at a young age to follow in the footsteps of Selous. He joined the army and was posted to Africa, where during leaves of absence he went poaching. He learned to hunt big game of all sorts, including elephants. He left the army once his hunting became financially self-supporting, and set up with a partner in Nairobi to guide wealthy Americans. His specimens can be found in the collections of the British Museum, the National Museums of Kenya (in his day known as the Coryndon Memorial Museum), and Harvard's Museum of Comparative Zoology. He became a game warden and is known as the father of the Selous Game Reserve in what is now Tanzania.

=== Petrus Jacobs ===
Petrus Jacobs was an early Boer elephant hunter in South Africa, described by Frederick Selous as "the most experienced elephant hunter in South Africa." Over seventy-three years old when Selous met him, Jacobs must have been born around 1800. Jacobs is believed to have killed between 400 and 500 bull elephants, mostly from horseback but also on foot when hunting in tsetse fly country. Jacobs is also said to have killed over 100 lions, Selous saw him be mauled badly by one at over seventy-three years of age, he was saved by his three powerful dogs who attacked the lion's hind quarters, and within two months he was able to ride a horse again.

=== Frederick Vaughan Kirby ===
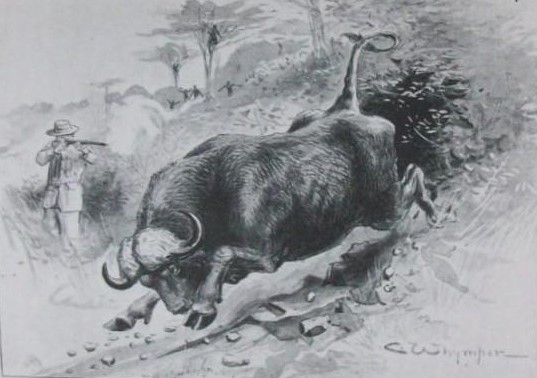
Kirby hunting buffalo from In Haunts of Wild Game.

Frederick Vaughan Kirby was a soldier, traveller, big-game hunter and collector of natural history specimens. Irish born, Kirby hunted extensively throughout Portuguese East Africa and the eastern Transvaal until the Anglo-Boer War, publishing two books on his hunting experiences, In haunts of wild game in 1896 and Sport in east central Africa in 1899. After service in the Anglo-Boer War Kirby applied for employment on the Sabie Game Reserve but instead he became superintendent of the Transvaal Museum's zoological gardens until 1907, by 1908 he was making a living by selling birds and mammals to museums and private collectors. In 1911 Kirby became the Game Conservator for Zululand and he was instrumental in the proclamation of the uMkhuze Game Reserve before his retirement in 1929. Over the course of his life Kirby hunted elephant, rhinoceros, hippopotamus, buffalo, lion, leopard, giraffe, eland, kudu, sable antelope, wildebeest, crocodiles and numerous smaller game. Kirby hunted extensively with a Gibbs–Farquharson–Metford and a Gibbs–Metford double rifle in .461 Gibbs, a Westley Richards 12 bore double rifle and a 10 bore double smoothbore.

=== Karl Larsen ===
Karl Larsen was a Danish professional elephant hunter who did most of his hunting in Portuguese East Africa and Portuguese West Africa in the early 20th century. It is believed Larsen had shot over 300 elephants by 1909, and he continued to hunt in West Africa for another 17 years. One of Larsen's favourite weapons for elephant was a .600 Nitro Express by W. J. Jeffery & Co. One incident recorded about Larsen occurred on 20 January 1909, whilst on the trail of a wounded bull elephant in the district of Benguela, he came upon a pride of lions, killing seven of them in two minutes with nine shots from his .600 Nitro Express.

=== Harry Manners ===
Harry Manners (1917–1997) was a 20th-century South African elephant hunter. Born in Grootfontein to an English father and German mother, Manners shot his first elephant aged 17 using an old 10.75 x 68mm Mauser rifle. In 1937 Manners moved to the Portuguese East African hinterlands to take up elephant hunting, at the time there were no hunting restrictions there, he continued to hunt elephant (also selling the meat) professionally until 1953 when commercial ivory hunting was closed in Portuguese East Africa. Manners shot approximately 1,000 elephants in his life, his finest tusker had tusks weighing 185 and 183 pounds (84 and 83 kg), the fourth largest African tusks ever recorded, he estimated that for every elephant he shot with tusks in the 90 to 100 pounds (41 to 45 kg) range, he had to walk 100 miles (160 km). Manners predominantly hunted with a Winchester Model 70 firing the .375 H&H Magnum over iron sights (he thought a rifle scope added unnecessary weight), although for a period when .375 H&H ammunition was suddenly unavailable he resorted to a .30-06 Springfield, although he only killed 40 elephants with it and only under the most certain conditions. Manners later ran a curio shop in the Skukuza camp in Kruger National Park, where he was a tourist attraction himself, in 1980 he published his autobiography, Kambaku!.

=== Bali Mauladad ===
Muhammad Iqbal "Bali" Mauladad (1926–1970) was a Kenyan sportsman and safari guide. Born in Nairobi, Mauladad's father was a millionaire building contractor and he was initially groomed to move into the family business, but his passions were hunting, cricket and car racing. Mauladad first went on safari aged 11, at 17 he started hunting big game and decided to become a professional safari guide, first working for Safariland and later Ker and Downey. Mauladad was the only non-white to be admitted to the East African Professional Hunter's Association, notable clients of his include King Mahendra of Nepal and Stavros Niarchos. For big-game hunting Mauladad used double rifles chambered in .470 Nitro Express and .475 Nitro Express along with a .416 Rigby magazine rifle.

=== Arthur H. Neumann ===
Arthur Henry Neumann (1850–1907) was an English explorer, hunter, soldier, writer and big-game hunter. Arriving in South Africa in 1869, Neumann held various jobs until 1877 when he took up hunting professionally, which except for a brief period of military service in 1879 for the Anglo-Zulu War, he did uninterrupted until 1890 in the Transvaal and Swaziland and along the Limpopo and Sabi rivers, shooting most game in southern Africa with the exception of elephant. In 1890 he entered the service of the Imperial British East Africa Company exploring for the Uganda Railway during which period he shot his first elephant. In 1893 Neumann departed on a 3-year hunting and exploring trip in East Africa, returning to England to publish Elephant hunting in Equatorial East Africa in 1897. Between 1899 and 1902 Neumann participated in the Second Boer War, in 1902 he returned to East Africa hunting elephant continuously until 1906 when he returned to England, dying the following year. One of the first to hunt elephant professionally in East Africa, it is unknown how many elephant Neumann shot in his life although it is believed to be in excess of 300. In his early career Neumann hunted with a .577 Black Powder Express double rifle and a .461 No 1 Gibbs–Metford–Farquharson rifle both by George Gibbs of Bristol and a 10 bore double rifle by Holland & Holland, when the .303 British cartridge was introduced he hunted extensively with a Lee-Metford rifle and in 1902 he acquired a Rigby .450 Nitro Express double rifle which was his favourite for elephant.

=== William Cotton Oswell ===
William Cotton Oswell (1818–1893) was an English-born 19th-century explorer and big-game hunter. In 1837 Oswell entered the service of the British East India Company, whilst in India he enjoyed fox coursing with Afghan hounds, pig sticking, snipe shooting, and big-game hunting, shooting sambar, chital and bear, although in 1844 after suffering from severe malaria he was sent to the Cape Colony to recover. Once Oswell arrived in Africa his health quickly recovered and over the next 8 years, except for a short period in England and India, he spent his time exploring and hunting. No source describes the total amount of game Oswell shot, but he shot large numbers of elephant, rhinoceros, buffalo, hippopotamus, giraffe and quagga. Every animal Oswell shot, except 3 elephant, were subsequently completely eaten by his camp followers or local tribesmen, he once fed 600 highly emaciated men, women and children of the Bakaa tribe for 7 weeks and sent them home with an abundant supply of meat. According to Sir Samuel Baker, Oswell "was a first-rate horseman, and all of his shooting was from the saddle, or by dismounting for a shot after he had run his game to bay". Always shooting game from the closest possible range, Oswell had horses he was riding killed by buffalo and white rhinoceros, and on one occasion a lioness landed on his horse's rump. Oswell did almost all of his hunting with a double-barrelled 10 bore muzzle loader made by Purdey which weighed 10 pounds (4.5 kg), fired 5 to 6 drams (8.9 to 10.6 g) of fine powder and was specially built to fire solid balls.

=== Pete Pearson ===
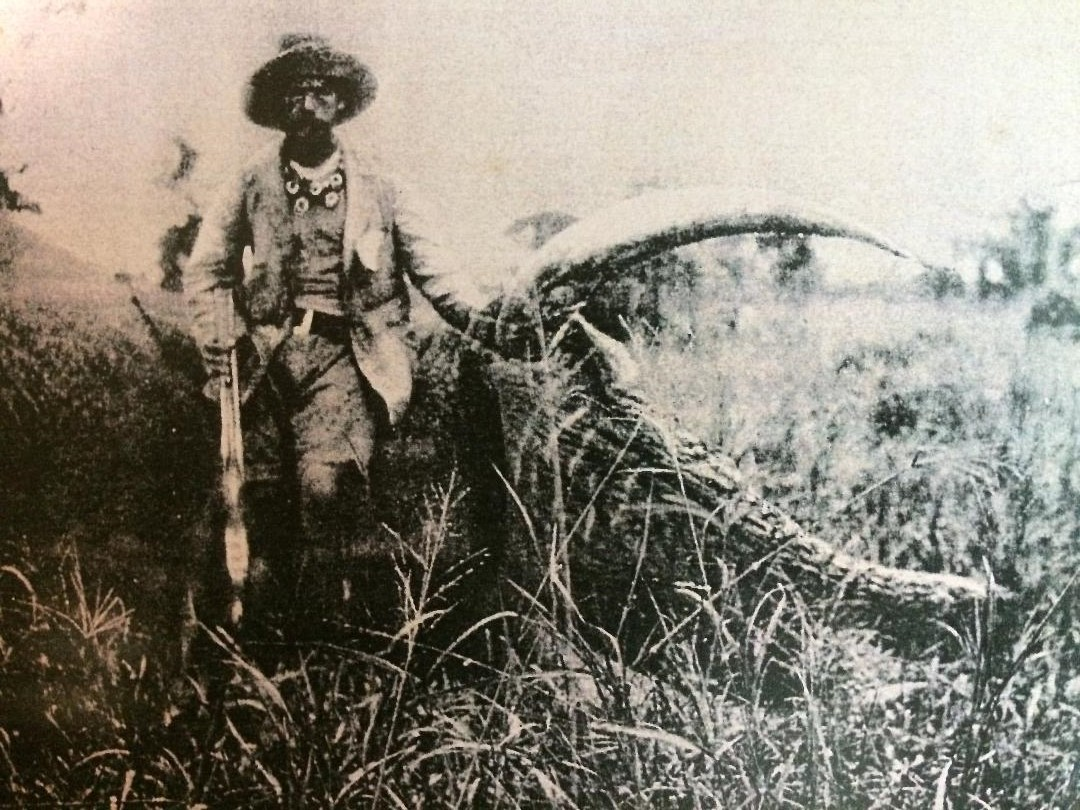
Pearson with elephant, Lado Enclave 1905

Peter C. "Pete" Pearson (1876–1929) was an Australian born game ranger and elephant hunter. Born in Melbourne, in 1900 he volunteered as an ordinary seaman to get to South Africa to reach the Anglo Boer War. After the Boer War, Pearson remained in Africa and in 1903 he arrived in Kenya to hunt elephant. In 1904 Pearson moved into the Lado Enclave to poach elephant, returning to licensed hunting in 1910 in the Belgian Congo and later in Ubangi-Shari. During the Great War Pearson enlisted to the intelligence department, afterwards he returned to hunting in Tanganyika. In 1924 Pearson joined the Uganda Game Department as an elephant hunter, controlling elephant numbers which were causing significant damage to crops. In 1924 Pearson accompanied the safari for the Duke and Duchess of York (later King George VI and Queen Elizabeth the Queen Mother) as a hunting guide during their visit to Uganda. In 1928 the Prince of Wales (later King Edward VIII) travelled through East Africa including Uganda, Pearson was charged with organising a hunting safari and for 8 days the Royal party hunted under Pearson's guidance. On the last day of the safari, a rogue bull elephant charged the Royal Party and Pearson placed himself between the Prince and the elephant, shooting with lethal effect. It is believed Pearson shot as many as 2,000 elephants over the course of his life, he used a .350 Rigby, a Rigby Mauser .375 H&H Magnum, a W. J. Jeffery & Co. .404 Jeffery and a .577 Nitro Express.

=== Philip Percival ===
Philip Hope Percival (1886–1966) was an English-born Kenyan professional hunter. In 1906, at the age of 21 Percival sailed to Kenya having been drawn to East Africa by the tales of his older brother Blaney. Initially Percival tried various agricultural pursuits whilst he hunted recreationally with his brother and local ostrich farmers Harold and Clifford Hill, predominantly shooting lion, in time he started talking clients on lion hunting trips. In 1909 Percival received his big break, he was invited by Sir Alfred Pease to assist with a lion hunt for Theodore Roosevelt and the Smithsonian–Roosevelt African Expedition, following this he took to guiding hunting safaris full-time. One of the earliest established professional guides, Percival became one of the most respected and highest paid hunters of his day, his clients included Baron Rothschild, the Duke and Duchess of Connaught, Gary Cooper, George Eastman, and arguably the most famous Ernest Hemingway, who used Percival as the inspiration for the character 'Pop' in Green Hills of Africa. Known by colleagues as "the dean of hunters", Percival hunted with a pair of .450 No 2 Nitro Express boxlock double rifles made by Joseph Lang.

=== Major P.G.H. Powell-Cotton ===
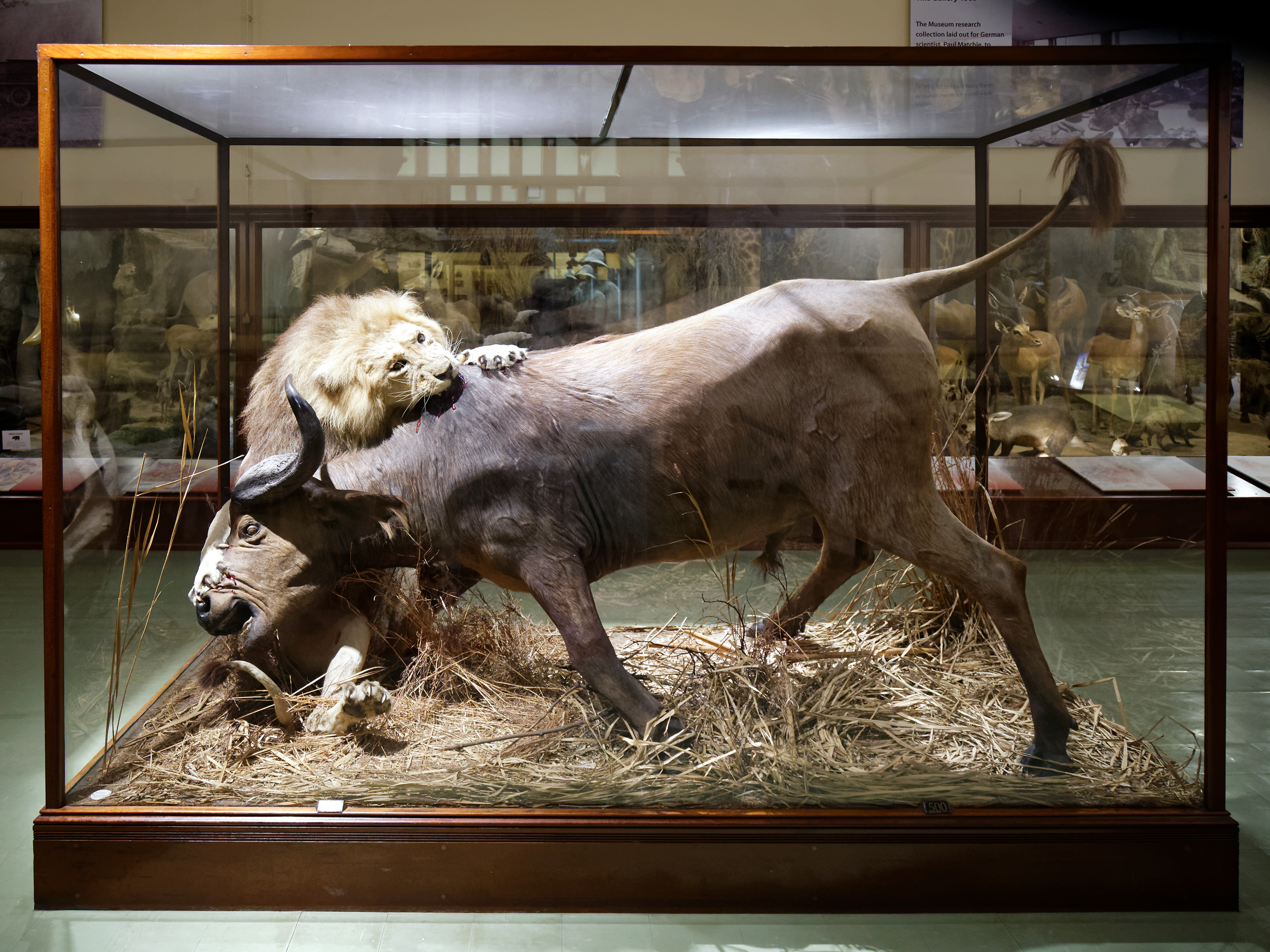
Diorama of a taxidermied lion and African buffalo, both shot by Powell-Cotton, at the Powell-Cotton Museum

Major Percy Horace Gordon Powell-Cotton (1866–1940) was an English naturalist, explorer, hunter collector and early conservationist. Embarking on his first expedition in 1890, Powell-Cotton made 28 expeditions over a 50-year period throughout Africa and Asia to gather and categorise zoological and ethnographical specimens. Powell-Cotton was primarily concerned with contributing to scientific knowledge through preservation and documentation, not with indiscriminately collecting trophies, returning with their remains to Britain to be mounted by renowned London taxidermist Rowland Ward. The Powell-Cotton Museum, built to house his specimens, contains over 16,000 mammal skeletons and skins but also includes butterflies, insects and birds. Among his most famous specimens was one of the largest tuskers ever killed, the pair of tusks weighed 372 pounds (169 kg), the largest tusk was 9 feet (2.7 m) long, 25 inches (64 cm) in diameter and weighed 198 pounds (90 kg). An inveterate client of W. J. Jeffery & Co., Powell-Cotton hunted with a .255 Jeffery Rook rook rifle, a scoped .256 Mannlicher, a .400 Jeffery Nitro Express double rifle, a .600 Nitro Express double rifle, a 12 bore ball and shot gun and an 8 bore hammer double rifle all by that maker, as well as a 12 bore paradox gun by Holland & Holland.

=== Paul Rainey ===
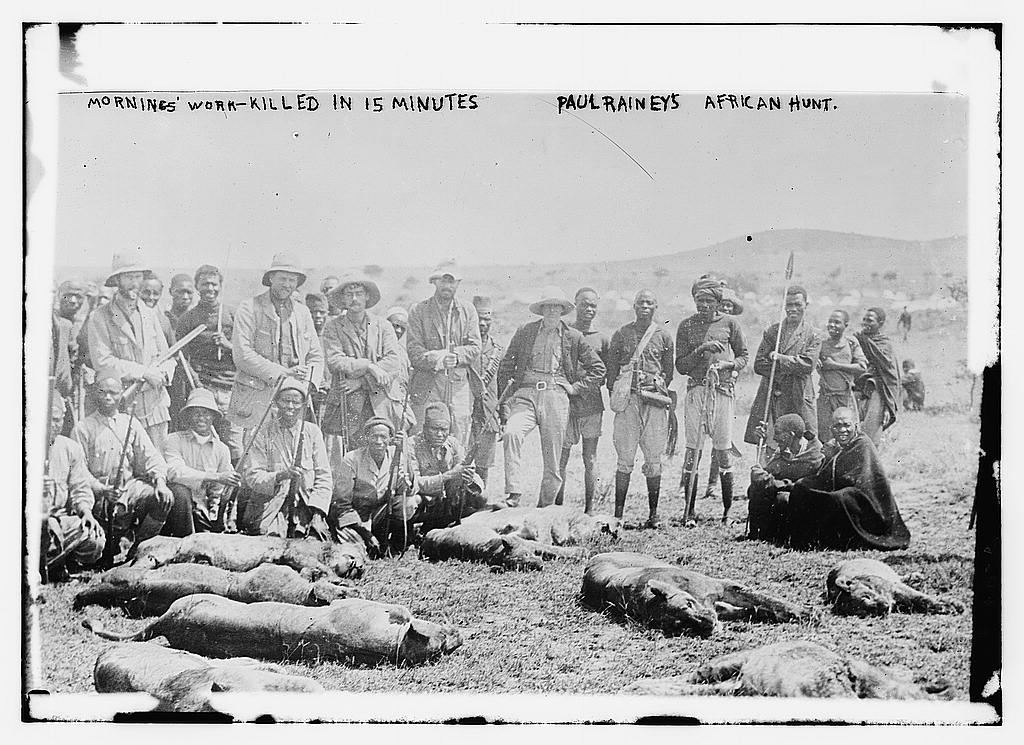
Paul Rainey's hunting party with a killed pride of lions.

Paul James Rainey (1877–1923) was an American businessman, philanthropist, hunter, and photographer. In 1911 Rainey set sail from New York with a pack of 15 Southern American Foxhounds, having informed a correspondent of The New York Times that his "principle desire" was "to trap wild animals and bring them back alive". Instead, Rainey is said to have killed over 200 lions using this pack. In an editorial, The New York Times later questioned Rainey's sportsmanship, equating his hunting to "butcher's work", John Guille Millais wrote "Paul Rainey's method of hunting lions with a large pack of hounds can hardly come into the true category of lion-hunting where risks are taken. The dogs, it is true, were often killed or wounded; but as a friend who had taken part in the hunts remarked: 'It is just like rat-hunting, and about as dangerous'." Rainey subsequently made a wildlife film of his hunting in Africa, Paul Rainey's African Hunt, released in April 1912 it was the largest money-making wildlife film of the decade.

=== Samaki Salmon ===
Roy John Dugdale "Samaki" Salmon (1888–1952) was a New Zealand born game warden and elephant control officer in Uganda. Arriving in Africa in 1911, Salmon became a coffee grower in the Uganda Protectorate the following year, gaining a reputation as a skilled elephant hunter by efficiently killing 20 elephant a year as was allowed with a planter's elephant hunting licence. During World War I, Salmon served in the King's African Rifles, being awarded a Military Cross for gallantry. In 1924, in an effort to combat the destruction to cropping and fencing caused by elephant that prevented the development of agriculture, the Ugandan Government created the Uganda Game Department and appointed Salmon as one of four white elephant control wardens, along with Deaf Banks and Pete Pearson. In the course of his duties Salmon shot as many as 4,000 elephant, more than anyone else in history, he predominantly used a pair of .416 Rigby bolt-action rifles, but also used a .470 Nitro Express double rifle if hunting in thick cover. In 1930 Salmon was appointed chief game warden of Uganda, remaining in that position until his retirement in 1949, during that time he was successful in extending the boundaries of Uganda's national parks and creating a number of additional game preserves.

=== Frederick Selous ===
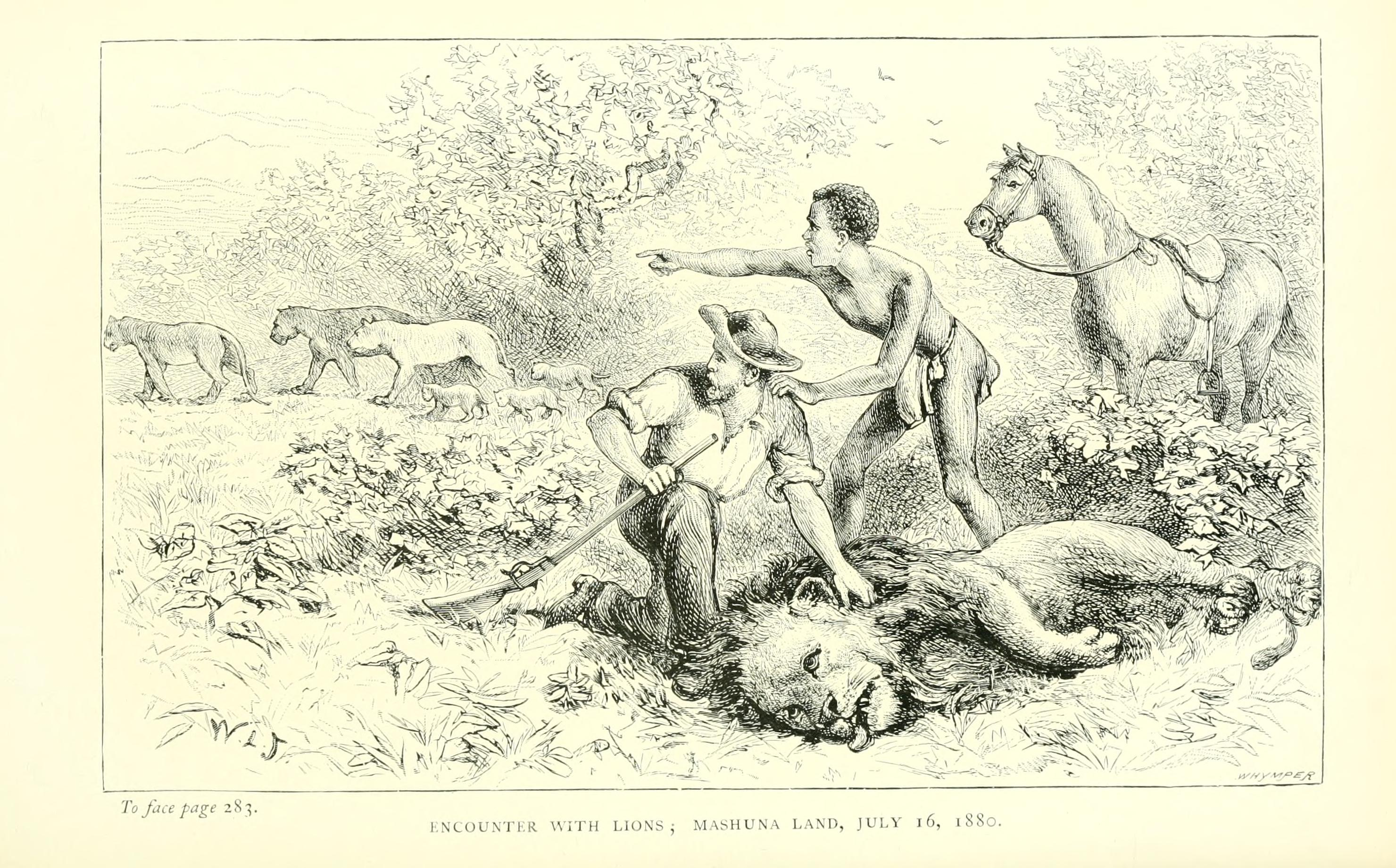
Illustration from A hunter's wanderings in Africa

Frederick Courtney Selous (1851–1917) was an English-born hunter, explorer, soldier and writer. Selous arrived in South Africa in 1870 determined to become an elephant hunter, hunting and trading predominantly in Mashonaland and Matabeleland until 1881, subsequently conducting several return hunting trips to Africa as well as hunting trips to Asia Minor, Wyoming, Transylvania, Canada, Sardinia, Kenya, the Yukon, Norway and the Sudan. Over the course of his life Selous shot 106 elephant, 177 buffalos, 31 lions, 23 white rhinoceros, 28 black rhinoceros, 67 giraffe and numerous antelope in Africa. Additionally, Selous shot moose, wapiti, caribou, wolf, lynx, deer and pronghorn in North America, red deer and wild goat in Asia Minor and red deer, reindeer, chamois and mouflon in Europe. Selous was provided with a large number of rifles by British gunmakers in the hope of his endorsement, but he makes mention of two Boer-style muzzle-loading muskets (known locally as "roer") which weighed about 14 pounds (6.4 kg) and fired 4 oz balls driven by 20 drams of powder, an 8 bore single-barrelled rifle, a 10 bore muzzle loading single-barrelled rifle, a 10 bore breech loading single-barrelled rifle, several 10 bore breech loading double rifles, a 12 bore double breech loading smooth bore made by W.W. Greener, at least one .461 No 1 Gibbs–Metford–Farquharson rifle by Gibbs of Bristol (a favourite), a single-barrelled .450 Black Powder Express by Henry of Edinburgh, a .375 Flanged Nitro Express falling block rifle and a .303 British falling block rifle both by Holland & Holland, a .303 British Lee–Metford rifle and a .256 Mannlicher falling block rifle.

=== Sir Alfred Sharpe ===
Sir Alfred Sharpe (1853–1935) was a British adventurer, planter, lawyer, professional hunter and colonial administrator in Nyasaland. After qualifying as a solicitor Sharpe practiced law in Lancaster for several years until 1853 when he moved his family to Fiji and unsuccessfully became a sugarcane planter, also acted as a local magistrate. In 1887, aged 34, he arrived in central Africa and spent the next two years hunting elephant professionally, predominantly in the Luangwa Valley. In 1889, whilst hunting in the lower Shire River valley, Sharpe had a chance meeting with Harry Johnston who immediately appointed Sharpe as his vice-consul. In 1897 Sharpe succeeded Johnston as consul of the British Central Africa Protectorate, later becoming the first governor of Nyasaland until his retirement in 1910. Whilst in the colonial service and after his retirement, Sharpe never lost his interest in hunting and whenever the opportunity arose he would go on long expeditions from central Africa into the Congo, from East Africa to Rhodesia, mainly to hunt elephant, the Sharpe's grysbok, Sharpe's greenbul and Sharpe's pied-babbler are all named after him. Between 1887 and 1892 Sharpe used an 8 bore double rifle and a single-barrelled 4 bore, whilst in 1893 he acquired his first bolt-actioned rifle, preferring them to doubles from that time on due to the availability for more than two shots. Sharpe hunted extensively with a .333 Jeffery and a .404 Jeffery, on an expedition in 1916 he used a .600 Nitro Express double rifle but discarded it after an incident involving four elephants; having shot the first two, he was charged by the remaining animals before he had time to reload.

=== Major C. H. Stigand ===
Major Chauncey Hugh Stigand (1877–1919) was a British soldier, colonial administrator and big-game hunter. Serving in Burma, British Somaliland, British East Africa and the Sudan, Stigand was a keen big-game hunter who took greater risks than most hunters and often came close to being fatally injured. Stigand was gored in the chest by a rhino, mauled by a wounded lion that he was following up in the dark, tusked through the leg by an elephant that he was trying to drive out of a garden (without a rifle) and was knocked to the ground by another wounded elephant which stood over him bleeding whilst he lay hidden. Stigand once crawled into a cave after another wounded lion which, luckily for him, had died by the time he reached it. Stigand wrote several books including Hunting the elephant in Africa and The game of British East Africa, he usually used a .256 Mannlicher for elephants, rhinoceros, lion, buffalo and smaller game, he also used an old big bore .450 Nitro Express double rifle which he usually had a gun bearer carry for him.

=== Jim Sutherland ===
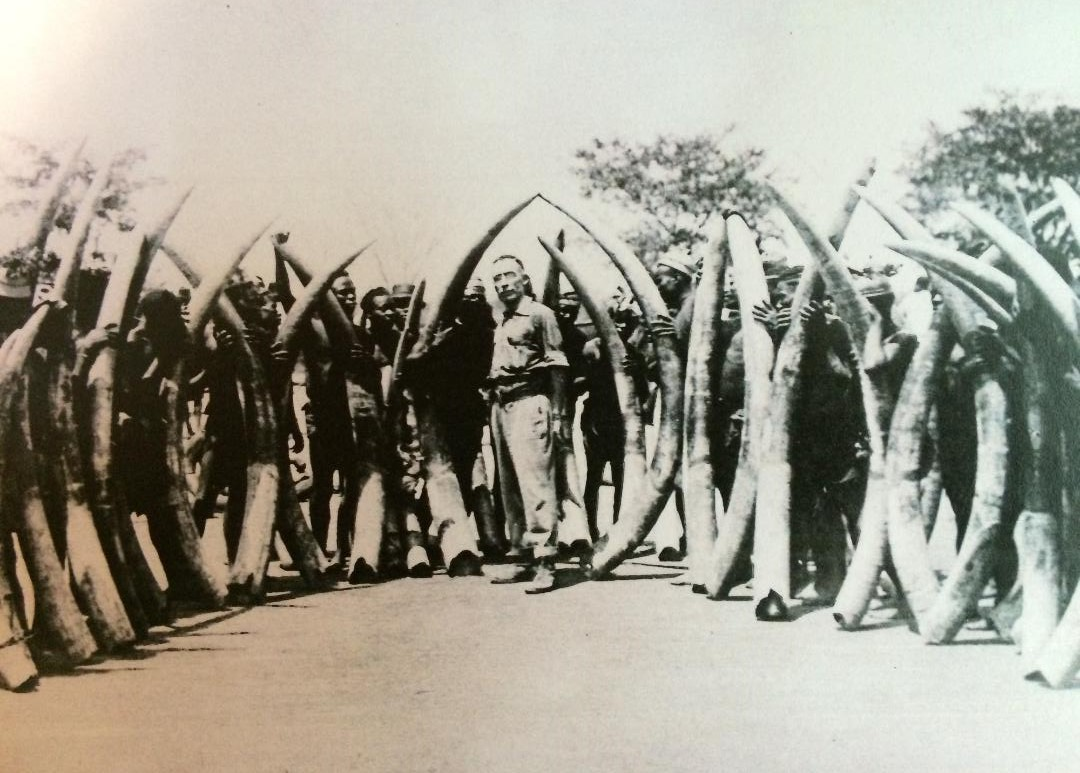
Sutherland with ivory, Ubangi-Shari 1925.

James H. "Jim" Sutherland (1872–1932) was a Scottish born soldier and professional elephant hunter. Arriving in Africa in the 1896, from 1902 Sutherland hunted elephant professionally in Portuguese East Africa, German East Africa, the Belgian Congo and the French Congo. Over the course of his life Sutherland shot between 1,300 and 1,600 elephants. Unlike "Karamojo" Bell, Sutherland preferred heavy calibre rifles for elephant and rhinoceros hunting, his favourite rifle being a Westley Richards single-trigger Droplock double rifle in .577 Nitro Express, he also used with a bolt action .318 Westley Richards for open country where quarry was difficult to approach and longer ranged shots were required. In 1912 he wrote an account of his exploits to that date, The adventures of an elephant hunter, upon his return to London in 1913 he was feted as the "World's greatest elephant hunter". Sutherland is considered one of the most successful of Africa's professional elephant hunters.

=== Colonel H. G. C. Swayne ===
Colonel Harald George Carlos Swayne (1860–1940) was a British soldier, explorer, naturalist and big-game hunter. Between 1884 and 1897 Swayne hunted whilst on active service in both Africa and India; between 1898 and 1927 he made roughly 40 further privately funded trips throughout Africa and Asia. Swayne shot numerous big game, including elephant, rhinoceros, lion, tiger, leopard and bear, the Swayne's hartebeest and Swayne's Dik-dik are both named after him. Swayne hunted with various rifles, in his earlier years his battery consisted of a 4 bore double smoothbore, an 8 bore double paradox gun and a .577 Black Powder Express double rifle all made by Holland & Holland, along with a Lee–Metford, a Martini–Henry and a 12 bore pistol. In later years he also used a .500/450 Nitro Express double rifle by Holland & Holland. He wrote 'Seventeen Trips through Somaliland' published by Rowland Ward in 1903.

=== John "Pondoro" Taylor ===
John Howard "Pondoro" Taylor (1904–1969) was an Irish-born big-game hunter, elephant poacher and writer. Arriving in Cape Town in 1920, Taylor hunted elephant professionally, often illegally, for almost 30 years in Kenya, Tanganyika and Portuguese East Africa, in his career he shot most of the big game of eastern Africa and it is believed he shot over 1,000 elephants. Taylor experimented widely with different types of hunting rifles, cartridges and bullet types throughout his career, his books African rifles and cartridges and Big game and big game rifles explore the practical application of bullet ballistics and type including articulating the "Taylor KO factor" to calculate the "knock out" value (a "knock out" meant that the elephant was sufficiently stunned by the hit that he would not immediately turn on the hunter) of cartridges and bullet types. Taylor's writings also discuss numerous American, British and European cartridges as well as rifle actions with comparative notes on double rifles, magazine rifles and single-shot rifles. In his writings Taylor expresses a preference for double rifles and makes particular mention of the .275 No 2 Magnum, the .300 H&H Magnum, the .333 Jeffery, the .375 H&H Magnum, the .450/400 Nitro Express (both the 3-inch and 3 1/4 inch versions), the .416 Rigby, the .450 No 2 Nitro Express, the .500/465 Nitro Express, the .470 Nitro Express and the .600 Nitro Express.

== Asia ==
=== Donald Anderson ===
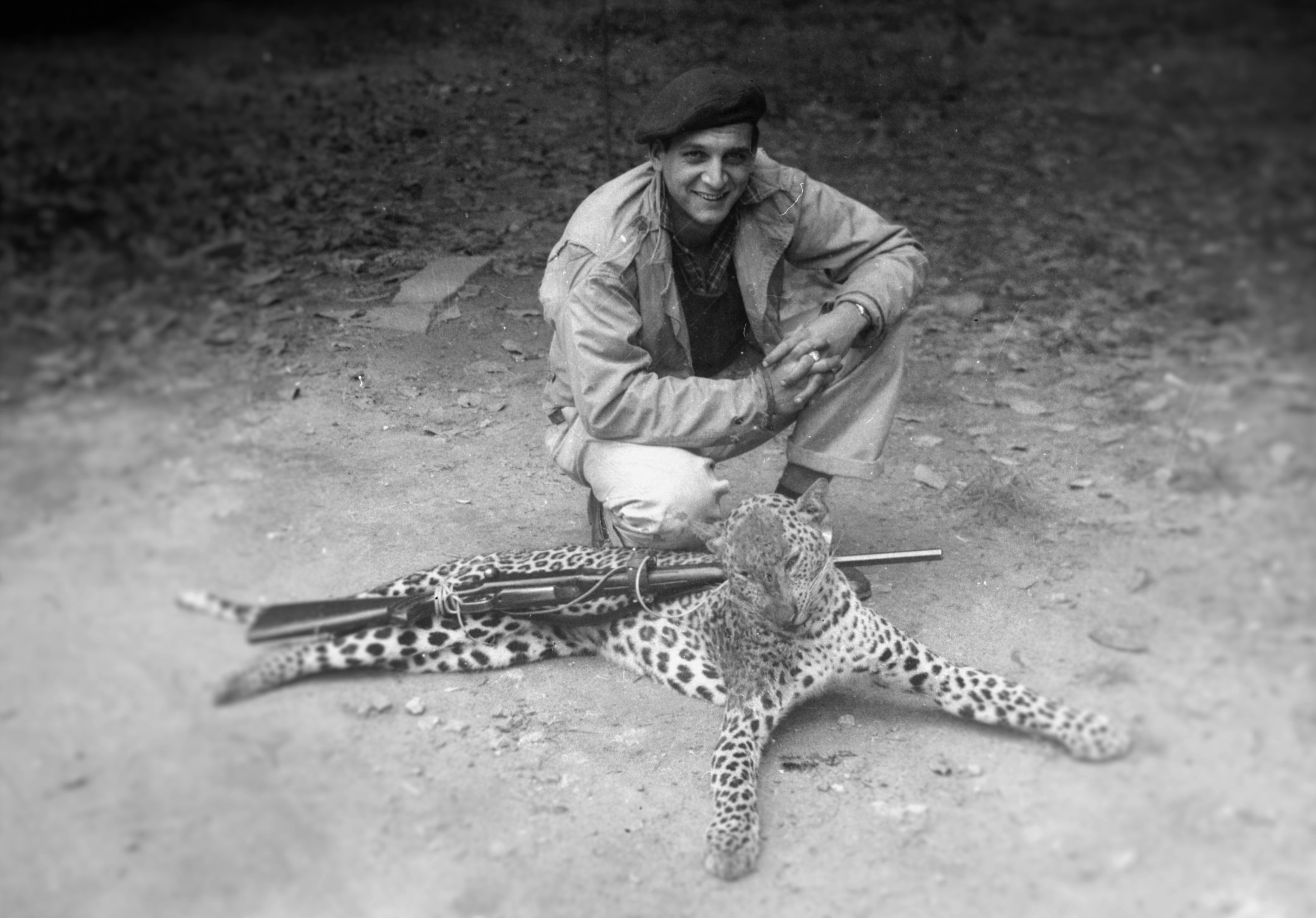
Donald Anderson with panther

Donald Malcolm Stuart Anderson (1934–2014) was an Anglo-Indian big-game hunter, angler and naturalist. The son of Kenneth Anderson, Donald shot his first leopard at the age of 13 and over the course of his life shot numerous elephant, tiger, leopard, bear, gaur, wild boar and deer, reluctantly giving up hunting in 1972 with the passing of the Indian Wildlife Protection Act. Donald gained fame from his contributions to his father's writings, describing several hunts for rogue and man-eating tigers and leopards, he was also Stewart Granger's stunt double for the film Harry Black and the Tiger. Donald lived in Bangalore and like his father hunted the forests of southern India, he hunted with a .423 Mauser rifle for large and dangerous game, a .30-06 Springfield rifle for deer and wild boar and a W. W. Greener shotgun. It has been claimed that Donald was one of the last white hunters from India's colonial period.

=== Kenneth Anderson ===
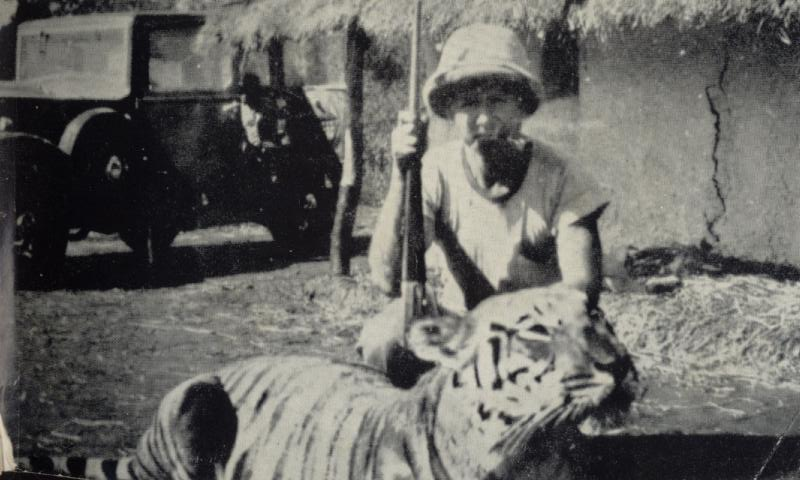
Kenneth Anderson with the Tigress of Jowlagiri.

Kenneth Douglas Stuart Anderson (1910–1974) was a British Indian hunter, writer and naturalist. Born into a family of Scottish descent that had been in India for several generations, Anderson was a civil servant in Bangalore whose main pastime was watching and hunting game in the forests of Southern India. On behalf of the government, Anderson shot a number of man-eating tigers and leopards as well as rogue bears and elephants that had threatened and killed local villagers, official records from 1939 to 1966 show he shot 7 man-eating tigers and 8-man-eating leopards, although he is rumoured to have shot many more. Anderson wrote several books about Indian wildlife, hunting and the locals of the jungle including Nine Maneaters And One Rogue, his observations about wildlife include the first account of a pack of dhole killing a tiger. Anderson usually hunted alone, his preferred method of hunting man-eaters was to sit in a machan over a bait, usually a cow or goat but on occasion the corpse of one of the man-eater's victims. Anderson hunted predominantly with a Winchester Model 1895 chambered in .405 Winchester and a double-barreled 12 bore shotgun, one barrel loaded with L.G. (Larger Grape) shot, the other with a solid slug.

=== Sir Samuel Baker ===
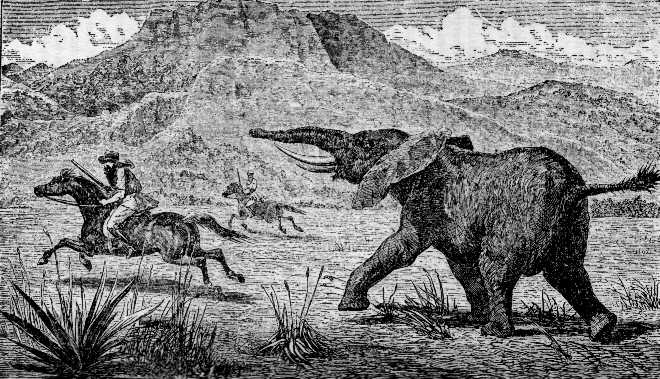
Baker being chased by an elephant.

Sir Samuel White Baker (1821–1893) was an English explorer, soldier, naturalist, big-game hunter, engineer, writer and abolitionist. Growing up on a country estate where he learnt to shoot, following a period in Mauritius Baker travelled to Ceylon in 1846 to satisfy his craving for wild sport, remaining there with some interruptions until 1855. Between 1861 and 1873 Baker conducted several trips to Africa to hunt, explore and on one occasion abolish some slave markets, in 1879 he started a three-year round the world trip which included North America and in later years he settled in England but would winter in India or Egypt. Over the course of his life Baker killed hundreds of Asiatic elephant, over 200 buffalo, 22 tigers, approximately 400 sambar, considerable numbers of boar, leopard, sloth bear, swamp deer, blackbuck and other game in Asia, over 50 African elephants, rhinoceros, hippopotami, buffalo, lion, giraffe, waterbuck, wild ass, 13 species of antelope and gazelle, ostrich, crocodile and others in Africa, wapiti, bear and a bison, in North America and numerous game in Britain and Europe. Baker shot most of his game, both dismounted and mounted on horseback, although whilst in Ceylon he also hunted sambar and boar with his own pack of hounds and a hunting knife, and coursed axis deer with greyhounds. Baker published his first of book, The rifle and hound in Ceylon in 1853, establishing his fame as a big-game hunter. Baker's career predominantly preceded the arrival of cordite, he shot with a number of black powder firearms including a specially built 6 bore single-barrelled muzzle loading rifle by Gibbs of Bristol, four 8 bore single-barrel rifles (two muzzle loaders, two breech loaders), seven 10 bore muzzle-loaded double rifles, one 10 bore muzzle-loaded double smoothbore, one 14 bore muzzle-loaded single-barrelled rifle, one .577 Black Powder Express double rifle by Holland & Holland (his favourite rifle) and two specially made single-barrelled rifles by Holland & Holland that fired explosive shells of his own design that weighed 8 ounces (230 g) each.

=== Jim Corbett ===
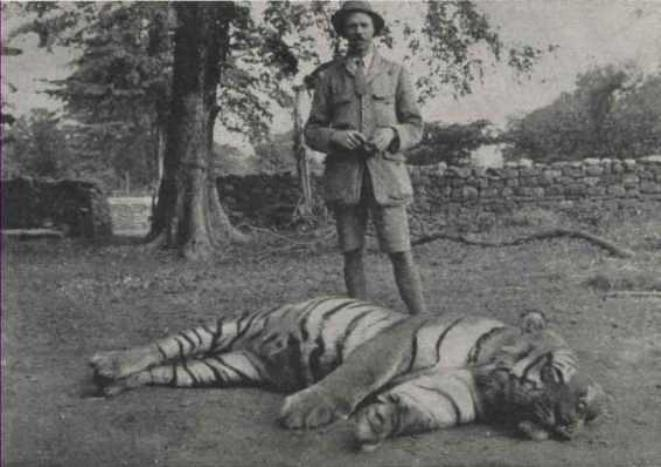
Jim Corbett with the slain Bachelor of Powalgarh, 1930.

Colonel Edward James "Jim" Corbett (1875–1955) was a British Indian soldier, conservationist, writer and hunter. Born and raised in India, Corbett served in the British Indian Army, serving in both world wars and rising to the rank of colonel. Never a trophy hunter of big cats, between 1907 and 1938 Corbett shot 33-man-eaters (31 tigers and 2 leopards) who had terrorised local villagers, it is estimated that the man-eaters he dispatched had collectively killed over 1,600 men, women and children. A keen conservationist, Corbett was instrumental in the establishment of wildlife protection areas in India, the Jim Corbett National Park was named in his honour, along with the Indochinese tiger (Panthera tigris corbetti). Corbett wrote a number of books including Man-Eaters of Kumaon, since publication his writings have never been out of print. Corbett usually hunted alone and on foot, only using a machan when absolutely necessary as he considered them unsporting. Corbett initially hunted with a rifle chambered in .500 Black Powder Express, later switching to a W. J. Jeffery & Co. .400 Jeffery Nitro Express double rifle and a Rigby bolt-actioned .275.

=== John Faunthorpe ===
Lieutenant Colonel John Champion Faunthorpe (1871–1929) was an English-born British Indian administrator, soldier, horseman, big-game hunter and sports shooter. Arriving in India in 1892, Faunthorpe was introduced to big-game hunting in 1894 and remained a keen sportsman for the remainder of his life. Faunthorpe was an avid horseman and was very keen on pigsticking, he is said to have also speared leopard, cheetah and swamp deer from horseback. Over the course of his life Faunthorpe is thought to have shot over 300 tigers, numerous leopard (he once shot over 100 in one year), bear and deer, shooting most of his tiger from elephant back. Between 1922 and 1923, Faunthorpe joined Arthur Vernay in conducting the Vernay-Faunthorpe expedition, collecting Asian wildlife specimens for the American Natural History Museums in Chicago and New York, during which he shot the rare Asiatic lion in the Gir forest. Faunthorpe was a crack rifle shot, he shot for Great Britain in the 1924 Paris Olympiad, he was also considered one of the best ever shots from a howdah, having the ability to make both snap shots and the patience to work with the sway of an elephant.

=== Captain Philip Gallwey ===
Captain Philip Payne-Gallwey (1812–1894) was a soldier, road builder and sportsman in Ceylon. Gallwey was the son of Sir William Payne-Gallwey, 1st Baronet and served in the 90th Regiment of Foot (Perthshire Volunteers). Gallwey is said to have killed between 700 and 1,300 elephants in Ceylon, depending on the source, in elephant control efforts. In the 1840s, the government of Ceylon offered rewards of 7–10 shillings for the killing of an elephant due to the destruction they caused to crops.

=== Sultan Ibrahim I of Johor ===
Sultan Ibrahim I of Johor (1873–1959) was the 22nd Sultan of Johor. An inveterate hunter of tiger, leopard and elephant, Ibrahim was also a keen conservationist who lent his wholehearted support and patronage to game protection in Jahor. Ibrahim appointed the first salaried Game Warden on the Malay Peninsula in 1921 and assisted with the establishment of the Endau-Rompin National Park in 1933.

=== "The Old Shekarry", Henry Astbury Leveson ===
Leveson shooting an Asian black bear, from Wild sports of the world.

Major Henry Astbury "The Old Shekarry" Leveson (1828–1875) was an English-born soldier, author and big-game hunter. At the age of 17, Leveson took a commission in the Honourable East India Company serving in India until 1853, he subsequently served in the Ottoman cavalry during the Crimean War, with Garibaldi's Red Shirts during the Expedition of the Thousand, in Lagos following the Lagos Treaty of Cession (where he was shot in the jaw) and with Robert Napier's expedition to Abyssinia. Over the course of his life Leveson shot tiger, lion, leopard, snow leopard, bear, wolf, gorilla, elephant, hippopotamus, gaur, wild cattle, buffalo, bison, wild boar, nilgai, ibex, chamois, bighorn sheep, moose, various species of deer and various species of antelope in addition to numerous small game and bird species throughout Europe, India, Asia, North America and Africa. Leveson wrote a number of books about his sporting experiences under the pen name "The Old Shekarry", including Hunting grounds of the Old World and Sport in many lands. Leveson stated his favorite gunmaker was Westley Richards, whilst a 12 bore breech loader was sufficient for all big-game hunting except elephant, for which a 10 bore was required.

=== St. George Littledale ===
Considered by many to be one of the greatest mountain hunters, St. George Littledale (December 8, 1851 – April 16, 1931) and his wife Theresa, conducted three great expeditions across central Asia, where they collected different species for animals and plants for the British Natural History Museum and the Liverpool Museum. Littledale has hunted horned and antlered game throughout the mountain regions of Asia, where he shot several wild goats and sheep, holding many trophies high on the Rowland Ward's Records of Big Game Lists, including 13 of the 19 caucasian chamois listed in the book, 6 Dagaestan Tur, a Tian Shan Ibex, and an Altai Argali. He also hunted extensively in North America, where he listed a Pronghorn antelope and a Rocky Mountain Big Horn Sheep.

Of the different Argali Sheep subspecies (Ovis ammon), the Littledale Argali (Ovis ammon Littledalei) smallest of the subspecies, located at the East of the Tian Shan was named after him.

=== Nripendra Narayan ===
Nripendra Narayan (1862–1911) was the Maharaja of Koch Bihar from 1863 to 1911. An avid sportsman, Narayan did most of his big game shooting mounted on elephant from a howdah. In his book Thirty-seven years of big game shooting in Cooch Behar, the Duars, and Assam, Narayan listed the total big game shot by him or his hunting party from 1871 to 1907 as; 365 tigers, 311 leopards, 207 rhinoceros, 48 bison, 133 bear, 259 sambar and 318 barasingh. Over the course of his hunting career, Narayan shot with "almost every variety of weapon", although he makes mention of a 4 bore double-barreled rifle firing 15 drams (26.6 g) of black powder, a .577 Nitro Express double rifle by Westley Richards, two .500 Nitro Express double rifles by Lang and Holland & Holland, a .500/465 Nitro Express double rifle by Holland & Holland, a .450 No 2 Nitro Express double rifle and a .450/400 Nitro Express both by Manton & Co, an early model 12 bore Paradox gun by Holland & Holland that fired 4.5 drams (8 g) of black powder and a later specially modified 12 bore Paradox gun by Holland & Holland that fired 33 grains (2.1 g) of cordite.

=== Major T. W. Rogers ===
Major Thomas William Rogers (1804–1845) was a British colonial administrator, soldier and sportsman in Ceylon. Rogers was the assistant government agent and district judge of Buttala, and a Major of the Ceylon Rifle Regiment who was said to have killed over 1,500 elephants in elephant control efforts. Rogers did all of his hunting with muzzle loaded 16 bore smoothbore longarms with the barrels cut down to 20 to 22 in (510 to 560 mm), and he used the proceeds from the ivory recovered to purchase his successive regimental commissions. Rogers was killed by a bolt of lightning in the course of his duties in the Haputale Pass, so popular was he with the locals, that the Buddhist population of the Uva district erected the Anglican St Mark's Church in Badulla in his honour.

=== Ganga Singh ===
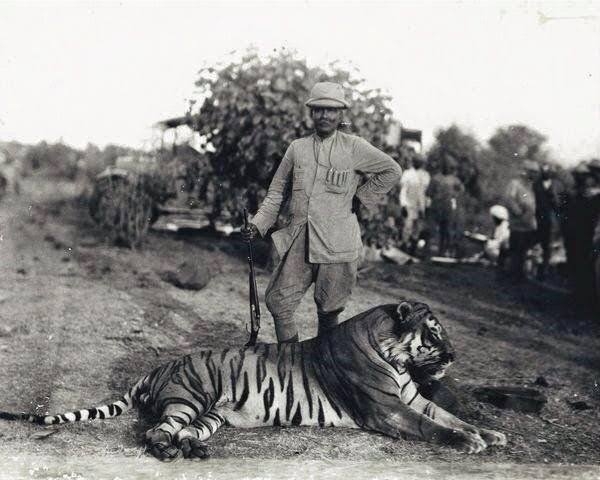
Ganga Singh with tiger, 1910.

Ganga Singh (1880–1943) was the Maharaja of Bikaner from 1888 to 1943. A very enthusiastic hunter who hunted extensively both within his own kingdom and beyond, Ganga Singh shot his first tiger, leopard and bear in 1869 aged 16 and in later years used hunting with visiting dignitaries to his kingdom as a means of diplomacy. By 1942 Ganga Singh had shot 266 tigers, 7 Asiatic lion and 61 leopards, most of these tigers and leopards were shot in Mewar, Gwalior, Kotah and British territories whilst the lions were all shot in or near the Gir forest. In addition to big game, over the course of his life Ganga Singh shot over 25,000 sandgrouse, 23,000 duck and 3,000 kunj.

=== Sadul Singh ===
Sadul Singh (1902–1950) was the last Maharaja of Bikaner from 1943 to 1949. The son of Ganga Singh, like his father Sudal Singh hunting extensively both within and outside of his own kingdom. Over the course of his life Sadul Singh shot tigers in central India, an Asiatic lion in the Gir forest, leopards in Bharatpur, wild water buffalo in Nepali Tarai, Asiatic cheetah in Rewah and beyond India cape buffalo, black rhinoceros and 31 other varieties of herbivore in Africa. Sudal Singh wrote an account of his hunting exploits, The big game diary of Sadul Singh, Maharajkumar of Bikaner which was privately published in 1936, in it he recounts shooting nearly 50,000 game animals and a further 46,000 game birds to that date; including 33 tigers, 30 Great Indian bustards and over 21,000 sandgrouse.

=== Major Thomas Skinner ===
Major Thomas Skinner (1804–1877) was a Canadian born British soldier, road builder and sportsman. Whilst Commissioner of Roads in Ceylon in the 1840s, he is said to have killed between 700 and 1,200 elephants, depending on the source, in elephant control efforts. In 1891 he published an autobiography, Fifty years in Ceylon: an autobiography.

=== Arthur de Carle Sowerby ===
Arthur de Carle Sowerby (1885–1954) was a British naturalist, big-game hunter and explorer in China in the early 1900s. Born in China to British missionary parents, Sowerby spoke fluent Chinese and in 1906 was invited to join the Duke of Bedford's mission to collect zoological specimens for the British Museum in Shaanxi. In 1909 Sowerby joined Robert Sterling Clark's expedition from the Yellow River into Shaanxi and then to Gansu to collect specimens, between then and 1915 he made four separate expeditions into Manchuria and Mongolia. Serving in the British Army during the Great War, in the early 1920s Sowerby found that his chronic arthritis was preventing him from making any more expeditions. Sowerby wrote several books about his sporting experiences, including Fur and feather in North China, A sportsman's miscellany and Sport and science on the Sino-Mongolian frontier. Over the course of his career Sowerby shot leopard, wolf, bear, argali, boar, goral, wapiti, roe deer, musk deer, sika deer and numerous small game species.

== Australia ==
=== Paddy Cahill ===
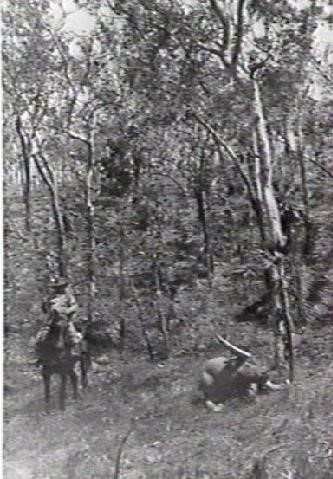
Wounded buffalo with shooter, believed to be Paddy Cahill.

Patrick "Paddy" Cahill (c.1863–1923) was an Australian buffalo shooter, farmer and protector of local Indigenous people. Born in Laidley, Queensland, in 1883 Paddy and his brothers joined Nat Buchanan in droving 20,000 head of cattle from Townsville, Queensland to Wave Hill Station in the Northern Territory, a task that took 54 weeks. Attracted by reports of up to 60,000 buffalo running wild on the plains of the Alligator River, during the dry season Cahill and his partner William Johnston hunted buffalo for their hides and horns from semi-mobile camps with a workforce of Aboriginal Australians; at the time buffalo hides were worth £1 each. Cahill later bought a pearling lugger and in 1906 he settled on a farm at Oenpelli (present-day Gunbalanya), deeply interested in and empathetic to the local Aboriginal people, he sought to minimize their contacts with Europeans, particularly missionaries, and in 1912 was appointed a 'Protector of Aborigines' and manager of a reserve based on Oenpelli. Cahill hunted buffalo mostly from horseback, he killed 1605 buffalo in his most successful season, his most successful day hunting saw 48 buffalo killed, he attributed much of his success to his fast intelligent horse St Lawrence.

=== Tom Cole ===
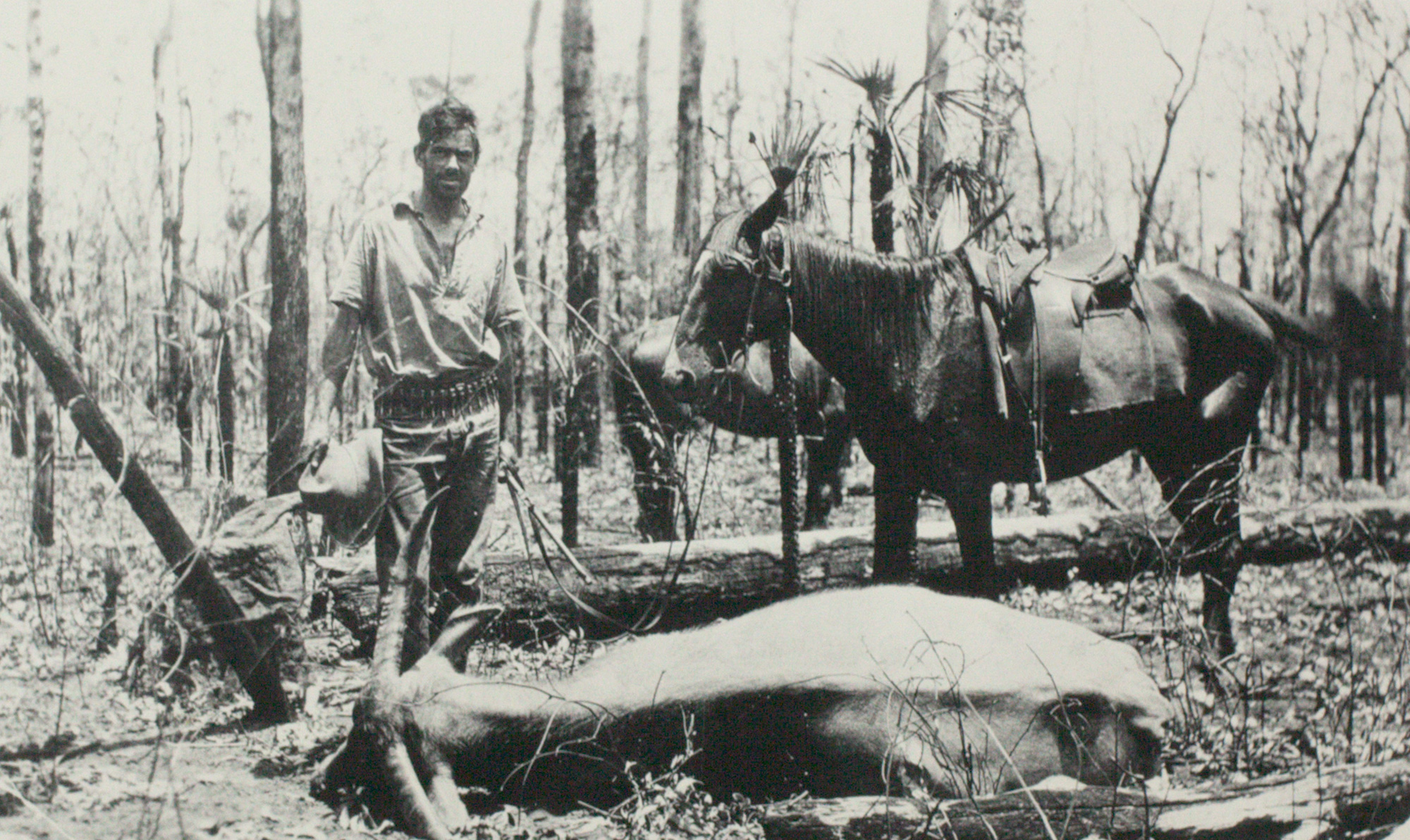
Tom Cole with dead buffalo.

Thomas Edward "Tom" Cole (1906–1995) was an English-born Australian stockman, horse-breaker, brumby runner, drover, buffalo shooter, crocodile shooter, coffee grower and author. Arriving in Australia in 1923, Cole worked on various cattle stations in Queensland and the Northern Territory before taking up droving for a year, then breaking horses at Banka Banka Station. After a short time running brumbies on Inverway Station, in 1932 Cole started hunting buffalo for their hides. In 1933 Cole purchased 100 square miles of land on the Wildman River and took to hunting buffalo professionally, also shooting crocodiles for their skins. After a brief period of service World War 2 Cole tried running a laundry and dry cleaning business in Sydney, before becoming Papua New Guinea's first professional crocodile shooter. Cole hunted buffalo mostly from horseback with a .303 British service rifle, he killed 1600 buffalo in his most successful season, his most successful day hunting saw 36 buffalo killed. In 1988 Cole published an autobiography, Hell west and crooked, which sold over 100,000 copies.

=== Joe Cooper ===
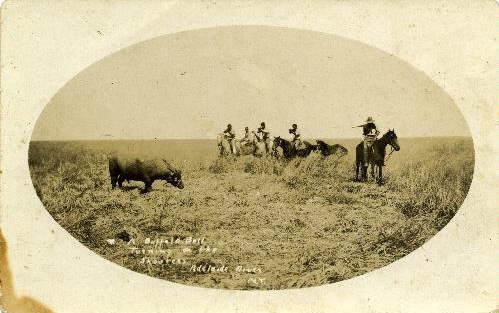
Buffalo turning on shooter, believed to be Joe Cooper.

Robert Joel "Joe" Cooper (1860–1936) was an Australian buffalo hunter. Born near Riverton in South Australia, between 1878 and 1881, with his brother Harry, Cooper arrived in the Northern Territory and for several years engaged in timber-getting and buffalo shooting on the Cobourg Peninsula and surrounding areas. In 1893 the brothers and Edward Robinson made an exploratory foray to Melville Island where, despite hostility from the local Indigenous population, they found thousands of buffalo. In 1895 Cooper returned to Melville Island as Robinson's manager, he was speared in the shoulder but abducted four Tiwi islanders, escaping with them to the mainland. Befriending his captives and learning their language, in 1905 Cooper returned with them and twenty Indigenous people from Port Essington and settled on the island. Cooper remained on Melville Island for ten years, shooting over 1000 buffalo a year for their hides and horns as well as cutting Cyprus pine and fishing for trepang. Known as 'The King of Melville Island', in 1915 Cooper left after accusations of cruelty by him and the Port Essington Indigenous people towards the local Tiwi islanders.

=== Edward Robinson ===
Edward Oswin Robinson (1847–1917) was an English-born Australian customs officer, trader, buffalo shooter, pastoralist and miner. Arriving in Australia before 1873, Robinson tried pearling at King Sound, trepanging on Croker Island, managing a cattle station at Port Essington and from 1881 was for several years a customs officer collecting duties and licence fees from Macassan trepangers. Whilst a customs officer, Robinson's main source of income was buffalo hides, he shot buffalo on the Cobourg Peninsula from the early 1880s and in 1884 he was the first to hunt buffalo commercially near the Alligator River. By 1897 Robinson claimed to have exported 20,000 buffalo hides from the mainland and another 6600 from Melville Island. Purchasing the lease for Melville Island in 1892, he appointed Joe Cooper as manager and supported his hunting on the island.

== Europe ==
=== William the Conqueror ===
William I (c. 1028 – 1087) was King of England from 1066 to 1087. Few hunting details have survived about William except that he was a keen huntsman whose introduction of royal forests and forest law to England (including the creation of the New Forest) have left an enduring impact on the ecology of that country to the present day. William of Malmesbury stated William's hunting was a form of relaxation to escape the pressures of daily business, the chronicler Ordericus Vitalis wrote that William enjoyed his regular hunting expeditions to the Forest of Dean and the Anglo-Saxon Chronicle stated he loved the red deer "as if he were their father". John Manwood listed the five animals protected by law for the early Norman kings as the hart, hind (both red deer), boar, hare and wolf, and it is assumed from the few hunting accounts of William's sons that the royal hunt was conducted on horseback with hounds. The royal accounts of 1136 from Henry I detail payments to over 100 hunt servants and archers as well as payments for numerous horses and hounds, the hounds were divided into the wolf pack, the king's pack and the main pack, the first two for the king's recreational hunting, the last for use by royal servants for supplying game to the royal table.

=== Louis XV of France ===
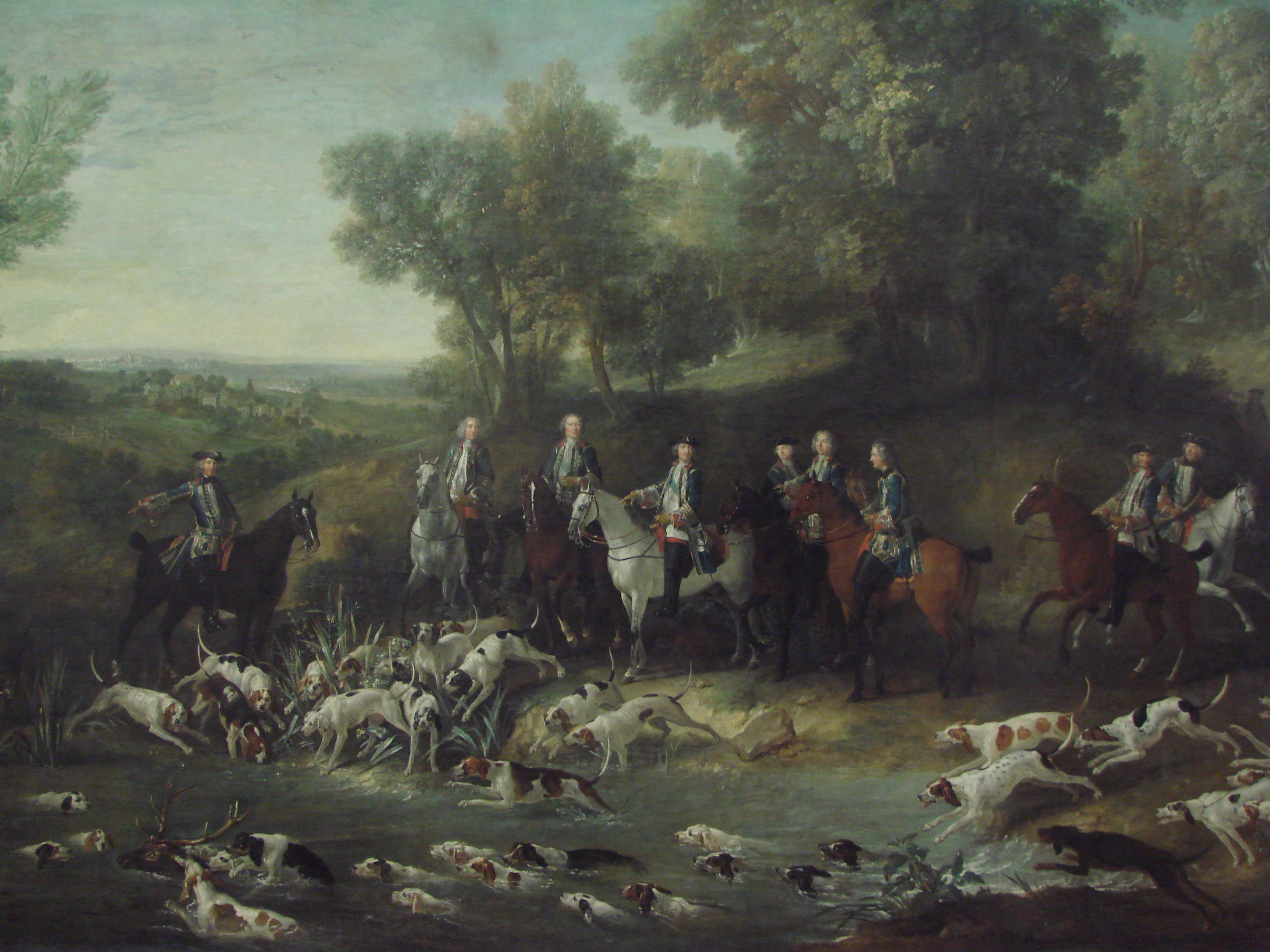
Louis XV stag hunting in the Forest at Saint Germain-en-Lay.

Louis XV (1710–1774) was King of France from 1715 to 1774. To the King hunting was an all-absorbing affair, in 1722 he drove from his coronation to his first hunt in the Villers-Cotterêts forest and by 1725 he hunted 276 days in the year and in that same year he was at the death of 362 kills, having ridden 3,121 leagues (12,166 km) behind his hounds. The King hunted with a huge pack of hounds called The Great Pack, made up of 40 to 90 couples (80 to 180 hounds) of different breeds, the number increasing during his reign. The pack was actually three packs divided between the game hunted, wild boar, wolf and red deer, and employed a staff of over 500 noblemen (each being on duty for 3 months at a time) and 250 horses, with a further 2,000 horses available for the use by the King, his courtiers and guests. Between 1743 and 1767 the kills of red deer alone by the Great Pack was 2,651 stags.

=== Victor Emmanuel II of Italy ===
Victor Emmanuel II (1820–1878) was King of Sardinia from 1849 to 1861 and King of Italy from 1861 to 1878. The King is credited with saving the Alpine ibex from extirpation from the Alps by creating the Royal Hunting Reserve of the Gran Paradiso in 1856. At the time of its creation there were estimated to be only 60 animals remaining in the Alps, the creation of the park and the appointment of a staff of 55 game keepers to watch and ward the remaining animals saw their numbers climb to between 500 and 1,000 head by 1877, this in spite of the King shooting on average 50 head a year. In 1920 the Royal Hunting Reserve formed the basis of Gran Paradiso National Park by which time it held over 4,000 head of ibex. An enthusiastic alpine sportsman, the King is believed to have shot around 232 male ibex, 22 female ibex and over 700 chamois in his life.

=== Ernest II, Duke of Saxe-Coburg and Gotha ===
Ernest II (1818–1893) was the Duke of Saxe-Coburg and Gotha from 1844 to 1893. The Duke held various extensive sporting estates including Reinhardsbrunn near Gotha, Schloss Rosenau near Coburg, an estate at Hinterriß and a boar forest in Alsace and much of his year was spent hunting; he was also a frequent guest of his brother Prince Albert at Balmoral Castle. The Duke shot 3,283 red deer and over 2,000 chamois in his life, as well as numerous boar, roe deer and small game, much of the shooting was stalked although in the forests of Thuringia the deer was usually driven and as the Duke aged, the chamois at Hinterriß were also driven. The Duke's favourite rifle was a .450 Black Powder Express by Alexander Henry with which he shot running deer out to 440 metres (480 yd).

=== John George I, Elector of Saxony ===
John George I (1585–1656) was the Elector of Saxony from 1611 to 1656. The Electors of Saxony were by ancient hereditary "Lord High Masters of the Chase" of the Holy Roman Empire, and John George I and his son John George II were possibly the greatest slaughterers of big game in history. Over the course of his life John George I shot 35,421 red deer, 1,045 fallow deer, 11,489 roe deer, 31,902 wild boar, 238 bears, 3,872 wolves, 217 lynxes, 12,047 hares, 19,015 foxes, 37 beavers, 930 badgers, 81 otters and 149 wild cats. These huge numbers of game were killed by a system of elaborate palisades and hundreds of game beaters who drove the game in enormous numbers to within range of the hunters and their still primitive muzzleloading firearms. John George I was also an enthusiastic organizer of area blood sports for the amusement of his court, using the great open market of Dresden as the stage he would pit aurochs brought from Poland against bears or wild boar and stag against wolves and occasionally the Elector would enter the arena himself to dispatch an animal with a spear, these events usually culminated in members of court participating in some fox tossing. It is said that John George I rejected the offer of the throne of Bohemia because the deer in Bohemia were smaller and fewer than those of Saxony.

=== John George II, Elector of Saxony ===
John George II (1613–1680) was Elector of Saxony from 1656 to 1680. John George II followed his father's love of slaughtering huge numbers of driven game, over the course of his life he shot 43,649 red deer, 2,062 fallow deer, 16,864 roe deer, 22,298 wild boar, 239 bears, 2,195 wolves, 191 lynxes, 16,966 hares, 2,740 foxes, 597 beavers, 1,045 badgers, 180 otters and 292 wild cats. In 1665 John George II rebuilt at enormous expense a high palisade fence originally built by his ancestor Augustus, Elector of Saxony in the preceding century and had fallen into disrepair. The fence ran the entire length of the border between Saxony and Bohemia and was rebuilt to prevent the Elector's stags from straying from his country.

=== James VI and I of Scotland and England ===
James VI and I (1566–1625) was King of Scotland as James VI from 1567 to 1625 and King of England and Ireland as James I from 1603 to 1625. James' reign was marked by his passion for hunting, he reimposed many previously relaxed game and forest laws, took a close interest in the royal forests and claimed the royal right to hunt all game all over England. Providing James with good days hunting was seen as a valuable way to curry favour with the king, although his secretaries often complained of delays in getting his signature due to his frequent lengthy absences hunting and various foreign ambassadors were on occasion kept waiting for weeks while James was away on an extended hunting trip. James born small and unable to walk properly or hold himself upright without experiencing pain in his legs, but he had considerable stamina mounted and he maintained to his couriers and ministers his need to hunt frequently to protect his health. James usually hunted stag and hare mounted with a pack of hounds.

=== Alfonso de Urquijo ===
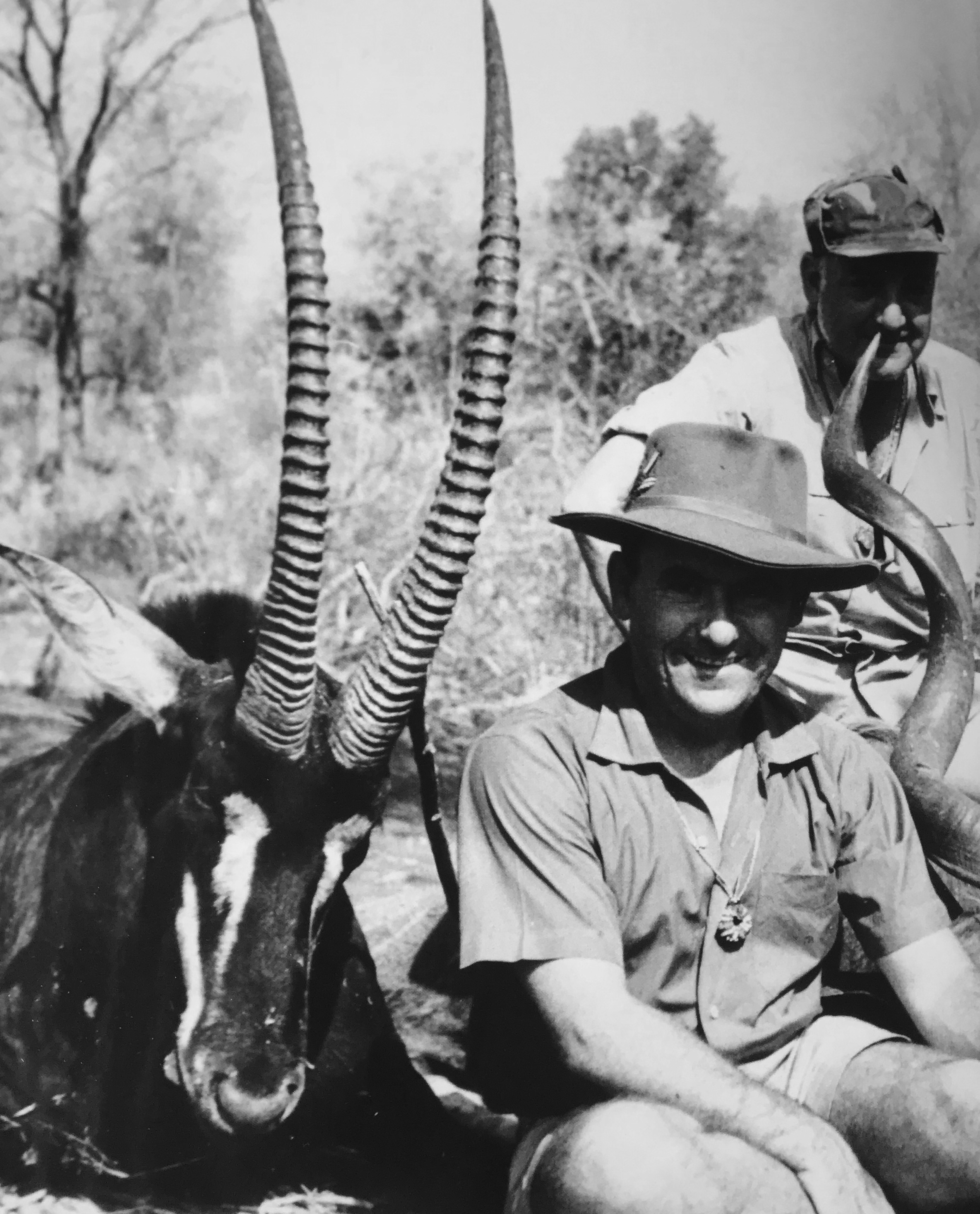
Urquijo (front) with the Duke of Peñaranda and a Sable antelope, Mozambique, 1967

Alfonso de Urquijo (1920–1994) was a Spanish big-game hunter, writer and banker. Born in one of the most illustrious families of Spain, he was introduced to hunting from young age. His hunting adventures were interrupted by the outbreak of World War II and his enlistment to the Blue Division, for which he fought throughout the Winter campaign of 1941–42, achieving the rank of lieutenant. Urquijo was a great expert in botany, a country lover and particularly fond of hunting, who suddenly found in the Aragonese Pyrenees the paradise of his hobby, although he also toured much of the world in pursuit of the most beautiful and remote hunting species. He was one of the first Spaniards to organise an expedition to the then territory of the Spanish Sahara, on the back of a camel. He was a prolific hunting writer, as well as of customs of the countries he visited. He published a large collection of biographical works, primarily of his hunting expeditions, and listed the 1,143 fincas or hunting estates that existed in Spain at the time. Already in the fullness of his life, he acquired the famous finca "Nava el Sach" in Sierra Morena, which he managed in an exemplary way, making it a meeting place for the great international hunters. In addition, he was a member of the Royal Spanish Hunting Federation, and a member of the National Board of Homologation of Hunting Trophies and introduced the International Council for Game and Wildlife Conservation (CIC) in Spain, an international body of which he was president for three years (1981–1984).

== North America ==
=== Holt Collier ===
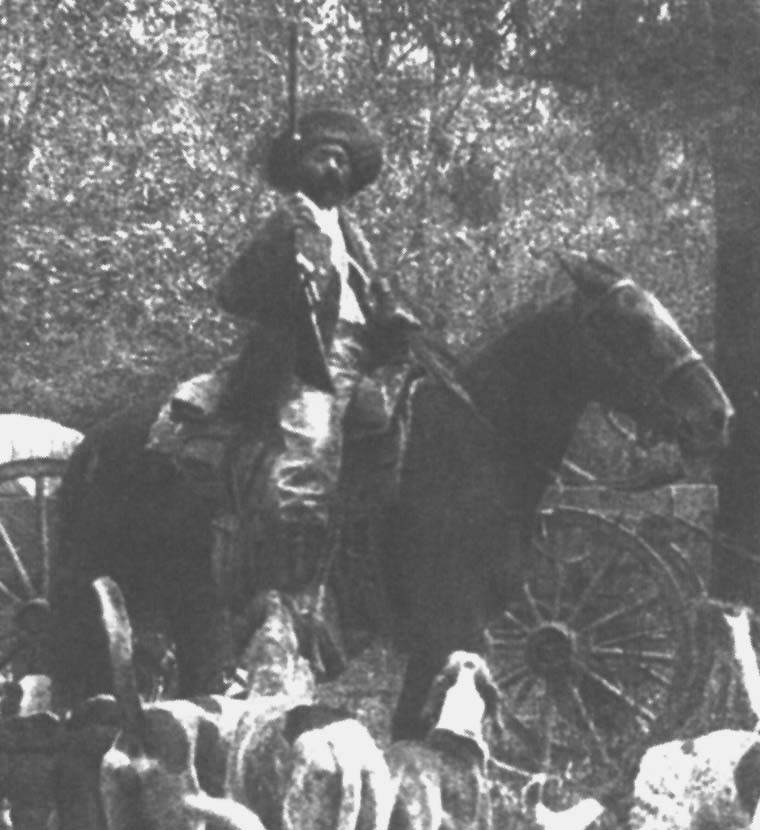
Collier with his hounds, 1907.

Holt Collier (c.1848–1936) was a onetime slave, soldier, cowboy and famed bear hunter. Collier was born a slave of the Hinds family of Mississippi; from a very young age he cared for the family's pack of hounds, and at the age of 10 he moved to their Plum Ridge Plantation in a rugged wilderness area of Washington County, where he was responsible for providing meat for the plantation's workers, he is believed to have killed his first bear that time. At the age of 14 Collier ran away to follow his owners, Howell and Thomas Hinds, into the Confederate Army (against their express orders because of his age), he was the only black man to serve in the Confederate Army from Mississippi, later serving in the 9th Texas Cavalry Regiment. After the war Collier worked briefly as a cowboy in Texas before returning to Mississippi and to hunting; he is credited with killing over 3,000 bears, hunting bears and cougars with a pack of hounds. Collier gained national fame when he took Theodore Roosevelt bear hunting, having promised a bear for Roosevelt he single-handedly captured and tied a large black bear to a tree, Roosevelt's refusal to shoot the bear as unsportsmanlike led the press to coin the nickname "Teddy bear".

=== General Wade Hampton ===
Lieutenant General Wade Hampton (1818–1902) was a Confederate soldier, South Carolina politician and plantation owner. Inheriting a significant fortune and significant landholdings in South Carolina and Mississippi, Hampton was a very keen hunter of wild game on his plantations, particularly one plantation located near Greenville in northern Mississippi. Over the course of his life, Hampton is thought to have been at the death of over 500 black bears, at least two-thirds of which he killed himself, and a similar number of deer. Hampton did all of his hunting mounted on horseback with a large pack of Southern American Foxhounds, with which in addition to bears and deer he killed around 16 cougars, several wolf as well as lynx and grey fox. Hampton was described by Theodore Roosevelt as "the mightiest hunter America has ever seen", he usually shot his prey after the hounds had brought it to bay, although he also killed 30–40 bear by hand with a knife, letting the hounds distract the bear whilst he walked up behind it to stab its throat.

=== Ernest Hemingway ===
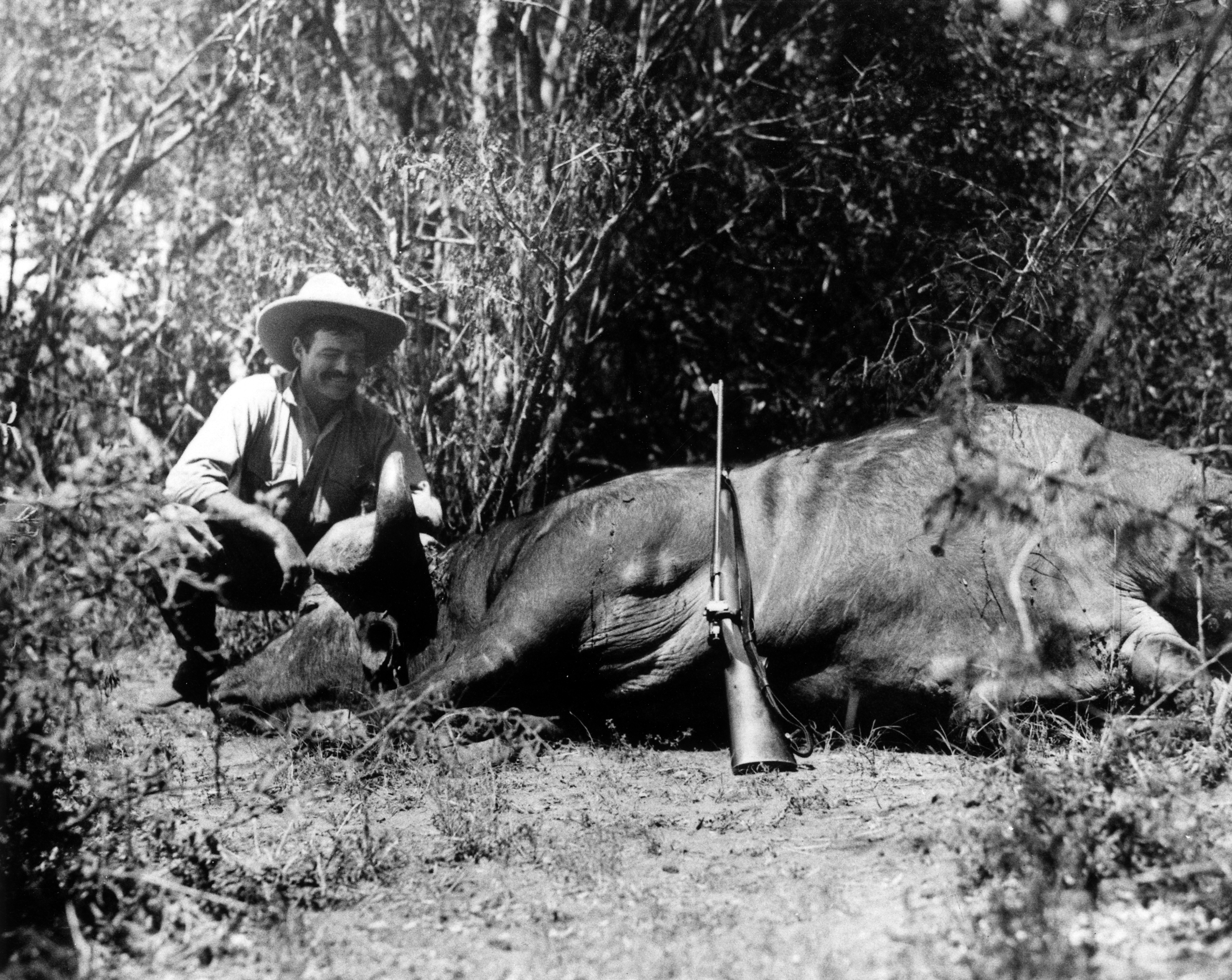
Hemingway posing with a buffalo on safari in 1933.

Ernest Miller Hemingway (1899–1961) was an American novelist, short story writer, journalist and sportsman. Introduced to fishing and hunting by his father when he was four years old, Hemingway maintained a lifelong love of both pursuits, trout fishing and duck shooting in various locations, deep sea fishing for marlin and tuna in the Gulf Stream and big-game hunting in Idaho, Montana and Wyoming as well as conducting two safaris in East Africa with Philip Percival as his guide. Hemingway shot brown bear, black bear, wapiti, deer and bighorn sheep in America and lion, leopard, rhinoceros, buffalo, kudu, roan antelope, zebra and numerous gazelle in East Africa, his sporting experiences gave him material for many of his short stories and novels. Hemingway hunted with a 6.5x54mm Mannlicher-Schönauer and a .30-06 Springfield sporter both by Griffin & Howe, a 10.75×68mm Mauser, a .470 Nitro Express double rifle and a .577 Nitro Express double rifle by Westley Richards (with which he also hoped to sink a German U-boat during World War II) as well as several .22 Rimfire rifles and shotguns for small game hunting.

=== Agnes Herbert ===
Agnes Elsie Diana Herbert (née Thorpe) (c. 1880–1960) was a Manx writer, traveller and sportswoman. Raised on the Isle of Man, Herbert found the prospect of a life of domesticity confining so, with her cousin Cecily Baird, she set out for the Canadian Rockies where the pair taught English cookery to Chinese kitchen workers and gained their first exposure to big-game hunting. Upon their return to Britain the cousins secretly began planning a solely sporting expedition, this time to Africa. In 1906 the pair arrived in Somaliland, shooting numerous game including lion, rhinoceros and various antelope, Herbert was mauled by a lion and one of her native guides was killed by a rhinoceros. The pair conducted two more major sporting expeditions, one to Alaska where they hunted bear, walrus, caribou, Dall sheep and moose and another to the Caucasus where they hunted tur, bear, ibex, deer and wild boar, Herbert published an account of all three trips. For their trip to Somaliland, an uncle provided them with a battery of rifles from his personal collection, including three 12 bore rifles, two .500 Black Powder Express double rifles, a .35 Winchester repeater and two 12 bore double-barrelled shikar pistols. Herbert's favourite rifle was a 12 bore firing soft spherical bullets and 5 1/2 drams (9.7 g) of powder which she considered ideal for lion and other dangerous game. For the Alaskan trip the pair took a .256 Mannlicher, a .375 Flanged Nitro Express double rifle and two .450 Nitro Express rifles, for the Caucasus trip they took .256 Mannlicher rifles and a pair of 12 bore shotguns.

=== Elmer Keith ===
Elmer Merrifield Keith (1899–1984) was an Idaho rancher, firearms enthusiast, author and sportsman. Keith became known as a regular contributor to Guns & Ammo magazine as well as authoring a number of books on rifles, pistols, hunting and shooting. Keith lived in the wilds within hiking distance of bear, wapiti, deer, mountain goat and moose, from boyhood he hunted these and other American big game species including caribou, bighorn sheep, dall sheep, antelope, bison, arctic game, cougar and jaguar, making frequent hunting trips to the remotest parts of British Columbia, Alberta, Alaska and the Yukon. An expert on shooting pistols and hunting rifles, Keith's preference was for cartridges with a caliber of .33 inches (8.4 mm) and heavy-for-caliber bullets from 250 grains (16 g) up, for African big-game hunting he used a .476 Nitro Express double rifle by Westley Richards and a .500 Nitro Express by Charles Boswell. Keith designed and used many unique cartridges for his North American hunting pursuits, his wildcat rifle cartridges are seen to have influenced the development of many modern hunting cartridges including the .338-06, .338-378 Weatherby Magnum and .340 Weatherby Magnum, he is credited with inspiring Winchester to develop the .338 Winchester Magnum.

=== Jack O'Connor ===
John Woolf "Jack" O'Connor (1902–1978) was an American author, outdoorsman and big-game hunter. After a brief Army career, O'Connor commenced teaching whilst moonlighting as a reporter. Moving on to writing magazine articles about hunting and rifles, he became best known as a writer for and later the shooting editor of Outdoor Life magazine, he also wrote several books about hunting, shooting and game animals. Over the course of his life O'Connor shot among other animals brown bear, black bear, cougar, bighorn sheep, dall sheep, mountain goat, moose, wapiti, caribou, mule deer, coues whitetail deer and pronghorn in North America; lion, leopard, elephant, rhinoceros, buffalo, kudu, sable antelope, oryx and various other antelope in Africa; tiger, ibex, urial, red sheep and blackbuck in Asia. O'Connor used and wrote very highly of the .257 Roberts, 7x57mm Mauser, .30-06 Springfield, .375 H&H Magnum, .416 Rigby and the .450 Watts Magnum, although for North American hunting he was an advocate of lighter flatter shooting projectiles and his name is synonymous with the .270 Winchester, his favourite cartridge.

=== Theodore Roosevelt ===
Theodore Roosevelt (1858–1919) was an American statesman, author, soldier, big-game hunter, naturalist, and the 26th President of the United States. An extremely enthusiastic hunter-naturalist, before his presidency Roosevelt hunted extensively during his ranching days, writing several books about these experiences including Hunting Trips of a Ranchman (1885), Ranch Life and the Hunting Trail (1888), and The Wilderness Hunter (1893). Throughout his life Roosevelt strove to save wildlife through the protection of natural habitat, during his political career he quadrupled the acreage of America's public forests, he built the United States Forest Service which came to administer one twelfth of the land of the United States and he created 55 wildlife refuges, expanded national parks, organized conservation conferences, and popularized a sensibility of respect for nature and preservation of the wilderness. After his presidency Roosevelt embarked on two major hunting expeditions to collect international wildlife specimens for American museums, the 1909–1910 Smithsonian–Roosevelt African Expedition to East Africa to collect for the National Museum of Natural History and the 1914–1915 Roosevelt–Rondon Scientific Expedition to the Paraguayan and the Brazilian Amazon to collect for the American Museum of Natural History. Over the course of his life Roosevelt shot cougar, grizzly bear, black bear, buffalo, moose, wapiti, caribou, white tailed deer, black tailed deer, mountain goat, big horn sheep and pronghorn in North America; lion, hyena, elephant, white rhinoceros, black rhinoceros, hippopotamus, zebra, giraffe, warthog, eland, oryx, roan antelope, wildebeest, topi, waterbuck, lechwe, hartebeest, kob, impala, gerenuk and gazelle in Africa; jaguar, tapir, peccary and wood deer in South America as well as numerous smaller game in all three continents. In his early days in the American West, Roosevelt hunted with a heavy .45–120 Sharps rifle and an English .500 Black Powder Express double rifle, due to their weight cumbersome nature he promptly swapped both for a .40–90 Sharps rifle, a .50–115 Bullard express 6 shot repeater and a Winchester Model 1876 chambered in .45-75 Winchester (a favourite). In later years he used a M1903 Springfield chambered in .30-03 (another favourite), which he supplemented for his African expedition with a Winchester Model 1895 chambered in .405 Winchester and a .500/450 Nitro Express double rifle by Holland & Holland.

=== Townsend Whelen ===
Colonel Townsend "Townie" Whelen (1877–1961) was an American soldier, hunter, writer, outdoorsman and rifleman. Retiring from a career in the Army in 1936, Whelen became a leading outdoor writer, contributing to various sporting publications including American Rifleman, Field and Stream, Guns & Ammo, Outdoor Life and Sports Afield, as well as writing a number of books on hunting and firearms. Whelen hunted all his life, taking his first deer in 1892 and his last 66 years later, over his life he shot numerous big game animals including brown bear, black bear, moose, wapiti, caribou, white tailed deer, mule deer, black tailed deer, bighorn sheep and mountain goat all over Canada, throughout the Rocky Mountains and in the Adirondacks. Whelen developed a number of rifle cartridges based on the .30-06 Springfield, including the .25 Whelen, .35 Whelen, .375 Whelen and the .400 Whelen.

=== Craig Boddington ===
Craig Boddington is an American hunter, multi-media outdoor journalist, author, outdoorsman, and retired Marine. He has been described as "one of the country's foremost authorities on African safari hunting" by ESPN and "one of the most experienced hunters of his generation" by Outdoor Channel. Born in Kansas in 1952, Boddington's early big-game experience included pronghorn and mule deer in Wyoming, whitetail and mule deer in Kansas, and mule deer in Colorado. Considered to be one of the most prolific writers in the outdoor genre, Boddington has written over 5,000 magazine articles, including for the Boone & Crockett Club's magazine Fair Chase and for Safari and Petersen's Hunting. He has written 30 books on hunting and firearms. and has hosted six outdoor TV series, including Tracks Across Africa and The Boddington Experience. Boddington has also been a featured speaker for numerous shows and organizations, including for the NRA's Great American Hunters Tour and Dallas Safari Club. His hunting expeditions have spanned all continents except Antarctica, and he holds numerous hunting achievements, including completing Africa's Big Five, hunting all nine principal spiral-horned antelopes, and holding the Capra Super 30, Ovis Super 20, two North American grand slams, and the North American Super Slam from Grand Slam/Ovis. Boddington stands out as one of two hunters reported to have taken all nine principal spiral-horned species twice. In 2017, he was named the recipient of the Weatherby Hunting and Conservation Award.

== South America ==
=== Sasha Siemel ===
Alexander "Sasha" Siemel (1890–1970) was a Latvian born South American adventurer, guide, actor, writer and jaguar hunter. At a young age, Siemel followed his brother Ernest to Argentina, in 1914 he moved on to the Pantanal of Brazil. Killing his first jaguar (with a spear) in 1925, Siemel became a bounty hunter for ranchers who had suffered severe losses of cattle to jaguar predation. An avid self-promoter, Siemel was famous in his own lifetime through numerous newsreels and articles, in 1953 he published a very popular autobiography Tigrero!. Siemel played a role in the 1937 series Jungle Menace and he was the subject of an abortive mid-1950s film project starring John Wayne (as Siemel) and Ava Gardner before filming was abruptly stopped whilst in the Amazon. Siemel hunted jaguars with a spear, a bow and arrows and with a rifle, using a pack of hounds to locate his quarry. By 1948, Siemel had killed 281 jaguars, 30 with a spear, 111 with a bow and arrows and the remainder with a rifle, as well as capturing 22 alive, this was 7 years before his retirement from hunting and it is believed he killed over 300 jaguars in his life.

== See also ==
- Big-game hunting
- Hunting
- White hunter
