= .461 Gibbs =

Rifle cartridge

.461 No 1 Gibbs
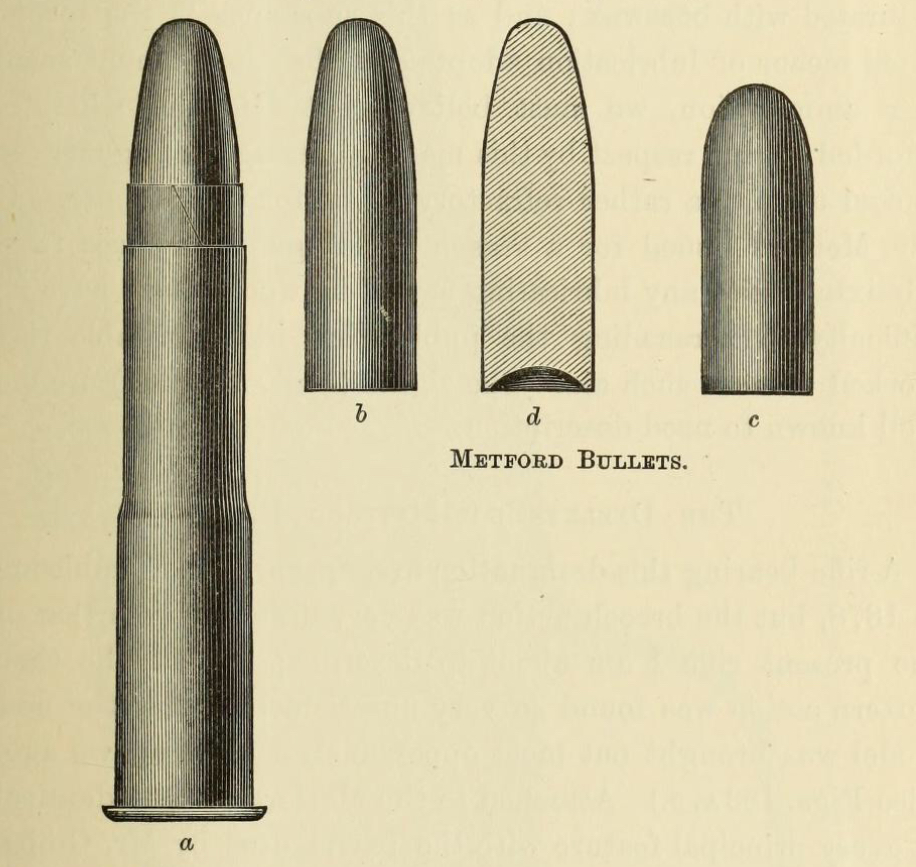
- .461 No 1 Gibbs with different bullets
- Type: Rifle
- Place of origin: United Kingdom

Production history
- Designer: George Gibbs of Bristol
- Designed: ~1879–1880

Specifications
- Case type: Rimmed, bottleneck
- Bullet diameter: .461 in (11.7 mm)
- Neck diameter: .482 in (12.2 mm)
- Shoulder diameter: .543 in (13.8 mm)
- Base diameter: .583 in (14.8 mm)
- Rim diameter: .669 in (17.0 mm)
- Rim thickness: .058 in (1.5 mm)
- Case length: 2.35 in (60 mm)
- Overall length: 3.38 in (86 mm)

Ballistic performance
Bullet mass/type	Velocity	Energy
360 gr (23 g)	UNK	UNK
540 gr (35 g)	1,300 ft/s (400 m/s)	2,027 ft⋅lbf (2,748 J)
- Sources: Imperial War Museums, Spanish Association of Cartridge Collectors & African Hunting Gazette

.461 No 2 Gibbs
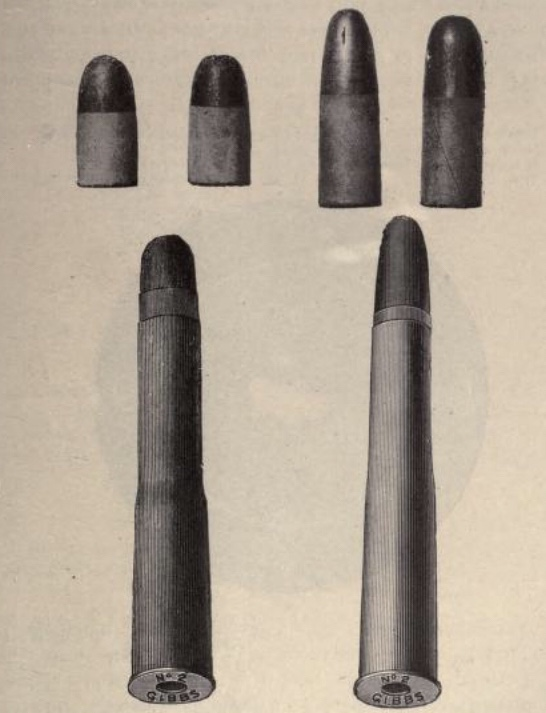
- .461 No 2 Gibbs cartridges, 360 grain cartridge and bullets on the left, 570 grain cartridge and bullets on the right.
- Type: Rifle
- Place of origin: United Kingdom

Production history
- Designer: George Gibbs of Bristol
- Designed: ~1890

Specifications
- Case type: Rimmed, bottleneck
- Bullet diameter: .461 in (11.7 mm)
- Neck diameter: .482 in (12.2 mm)
- Shoulder diameter: .533 in (13.5 mm)
- Base diameter: .578 in (14.7 mm)
- Rim diameter: .657 in (16.7 mm)
- Rim thickness: .059 in (1.5 mm)
- Case length: 2.75 in (70 mm)
- Overall length: 3.54 in (90 mm)

Ballistic performance
Bullet mass/type	Velocity	Energy
360 gr (23 g)	UNK	UNK
570 gr (37 g)	UNK	UNK
- Sources: Imperial War Museums & Spanish Association of Cartridge Collectors.

The .461 No 1 Gibbs and the .461 No 2 Gibbs are two obsolete proprietary rifle cartridges developed in 19th century Britain.

== Design ==
The .461 No 1 Gibbs and the .461 No 2 Gibbs are both rimmed, bottlenecked centerfire rifle cartridges designed for use with blackpowder. Both cartridges were offered with two loadings, when loaded with the lighter both cartridges were considered expresses.

=== .461 No 1 Gibbs ===
The .461 No 1 Gibbs, also known as the .461 No 1 Gibbs 2 11/32 inch, in express form it fired a 360 gr (23 g) projectile driven by 90 gr (5.8 g) of black powder, in its heavier loading it fired a 540 gr (35 g) projectile driven by 75 gr (4.9 g) of powder.

=== .461 No 2 Gibbs ===
The .461 No 2 Gibbs, also known as the .461 No 2 Gibbs 2 3/4 inch, was based on the No 1 cartridge case with a lengthened neck. It fired either a 360 gr (23 g) or a 570 gr (37 g) bullet driven by 90 gr of powder.

== History ==
Both cartridges were developed by Bristol gunmaker George Gibbs for use in his Gibbs–Farquharson–Metford single shot rifles built on the Farquharson falling block action, although Gibbs also built double rifles with Metford barrels chambering these cartridges. The .461 No 1 Gibbs was designed around 1879–1880, whilst the .461 No 2 Gibbs was designed around 1890.

Both cartridges were subsequently loaded with mild loadings of smokeless cordite, carefully balanced to replicate the ballistics of the original black powder versions, to become the .461 No 1 Gibbs Nitro for Black and the .461 No 2 Gibbs Nitro for Black, but unlike other similar black powder cartridges of their era, neither became a Nitro Express cartridges.

== Use ==
Both the .461 No 1 Gibbs and the .461 No 2 Gibbs were designed as match rifle cartridges for long range target shooting although both cartridges gained popularity as hunting cartridges.

Frederick Selous used a Gibbs–Farquharson–Metford rifle chambered in .461 No 1 Gibbs extensively in Africa. With this rifle he shot elephant, lion, giraffe, buffalo, hippopotamus, rhinoceros, zebra and numerous species of antelope.

Frederick Vaughan Kirby hunted extensively in southern Africa with several .461 Gibbs rifles, including at least one Gibbs–Farquharson–Metford rifle chambered in .461 No 1 Gibbs and a Gibbs–Metford double rifle chambered in .461 No 2 Gibbs regulated for the 570 gr loading. With these rifles he shot rhinoceros, buffalo, hippopotamus, lion, leopard and various antelope, stating that the .461 Gibbs was "perhaps as perfect a weapon for lion-shooting as one can desire". Kirby also shot elephant with these rifles, although stated elephant should only be killed with small bore rifles (Note: Before the advent of cordite cartridges such as the .303 British, all rifles under .577 in (14.7 mm) caliber were considered small bores.) under special circumstances.

== See also ==
- Express (weaponry)
- List of rifle cartridges
- List of rimmed cartridges
- 11 mm caliber
