= 10.75×68mm Mauser =

Rifle cartridge

- Type: Rifle
- Place of origin: Germany

Production history
- Designer: Mauser
- Designed: Early 1920s
- Manufacturer: Mauser

Specifications
- Case type: Rimless, bottleneck
- Bullet diameter: .424 in (10.8 mm)
- Neck diameter: .453 in (11.5 mm)
- Shoulder diameter: .480 in (12.2 mm)
- Base diameter: .495 in (12.6 mm)
- Rim diameter: .495 in (12.6 mm)
- Rim thickness: .051 in (1.3 mm)
- Case length: 2.677 in (68.0 mm)
- Overall length: 3.189 in (81.0 mm)
- Rifling twist: 1-16.53 in (420 mm)
- Maximum pressure (CIP): 47,862 psi (330.00 MPa)

Ballistic performance
Bullet mass/type	Velocity	Energy
347 gr (22 g) SP	2,200 ft/s (670 m/s)	3,830 ft⋅lbf (5,190 J)
347 gr (22 g) SP	2,230 ft/s (680 m/s)	3,870 ft⋅lbf (5,250 J)
347 gr (22 g) SP	2,250 ft/s (690 m/s)	3,900 ft⋅lbf (5,300 J)
- Source(s): Cartridges of the World.

The 10.75×68mm Mauser, also known as the .423 Mauser, is an obsolete rimless bottleneck centerfire rifle cartridge developed by Mauser and introduced in the early 1920s.

== Overview ==
The 10.75×68mm Mauser was introduced by Mauser in the early 1920s and chambered in their pre-World War II magnum sporting rifles.

The 10.75×68mm Mauser was a popular big-game cartridge with African and Indian hunters; it was used successfully on all dangerous game species up to and including elephants, although many experienced hunters considered it unsuitable for the latter.

John "Pondoro" Taylor stated the 10.75×68mm Mauser was undoubtedly one of the most widely used cartridges for hunting in Africa due to its low chamber pressure, the low weight of rifles chambering the cartridge, usually between 7.25–7.5 pounds (3.29–3.40 kg), and the low cost of the early German Mauser rifles. Taylor was very critical of the cartridge due to its poor sectional density and as a result poor penetration. Taylor stated the fully jacketed versions lacked the penetration for frontal headshots on elephant or shoulder shots on buffalo, and the expanding bullets were inadequate on lion and eland.

One prominent user of the 10.75×68mm Mauser was Donald Anderson, son of Kenneth Anderson, who used a rifle chambering this cartridge to hunt almost all Indian dangerous game species and who stated it was far superior to his father's .405 Winchester.

== See also ==
- List of rifle cartridges
