= Elephant gun =

Large caliber gun

- Type: Hunting rifle; Heavy rifle; (Limited military usage)
- Place of origin: Europe

Service history
- In service: Late 19th century–present
- Wars: Anglo-Zulu War; Mahdist War; Boer Wars; Second Matabele War; World War I; African campaigns of World War II

Production history
- Designer: Various
- Designed: Late 19th century
- Manufacturer: Various firearm manufacturers
- Produced: Late 1800s–present
- Variants: Double-barrel rifles; Bolt-action rifles; Single-shot rifles

Specifications (Typical examples)
- Mass: 4–8 kg
- Length: 1.1–1.4 m
- Barrel length: 55–75 cm
- Crew: 1
- Cartridge: Various large-calibre cartridges
- Caliber: 10–20 mm
- Barrels: 1 or 2
- Action: Break-action; Bolt-action; Single-shot
- Muzzle velocity: 600–900 m/s
- Effective firing range: 100–200 m (effective)
- Feed system: Single-shot; Internal magazine
- Sights: Iron sights

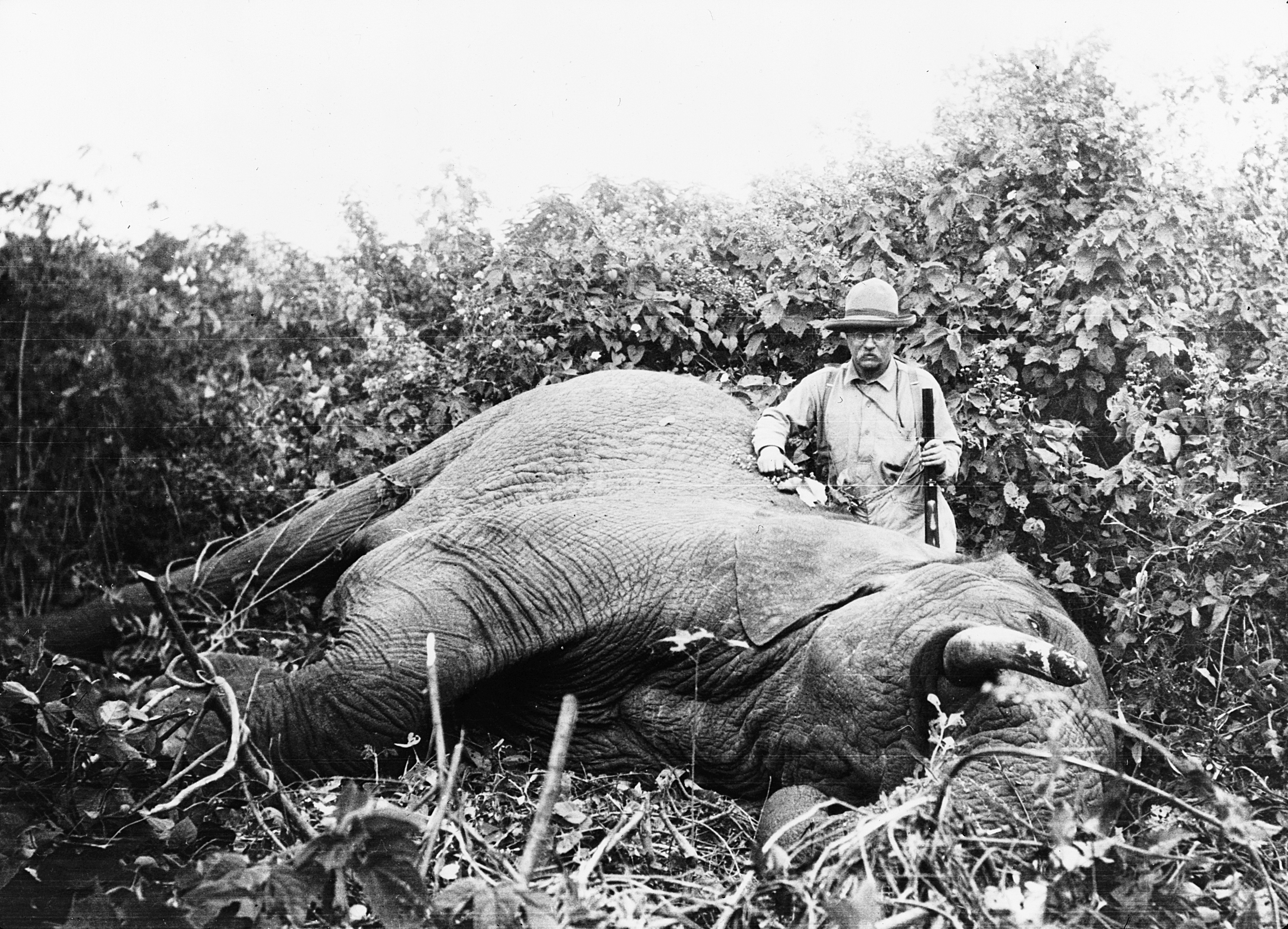
Theodore Roosevelt with a Holland & Holland double rifle in .500/450 Nitro and bagged elephant.

An elephant gun is a large caliber gun, rifled or smoothbore, originally developed for use by big-game hunters for elephant and other large game. Elephant guns were black powder muzzle-loaders at first, then black powder express rifles; they now use smokeless powder cartridges.

== Early use ==
As Europeans made inroads into Africa in the early 19th century, guns were developed to handle the very large game encountered. This was for self-protection, food gathering, and sport. The first guns were the simple muzzle-loading shotgun designs already used for birds and loaded with solid balls of lead for use on large game. Due to their ineffectiveness on the largest game (up to 35 shots being recorded by some writers for a single elephant), they soon developed into larger caliber black powder smoothbores. The caliber was still measured in bore or gauge—10, 8, 6, 4 bore, and 2 bore—or the guns were named by number of projectiles per pound. The projectiles were lead round balls or short conical slugs, sometimes hardened with antimony.

These very large and very heavy firearms were the first to be known as the elephant guns of the black powder era (1850–1900), though their use also included all thick-skinned dangerous game such as rhinoceros, hippopotamus and cape buffalo. Due to the velocity limitations of black powder and lead—usually around 460 metres per second (1,500 ft/s)—the only way to increase penetration was to make a larger gun. The largest-bore guns in common use (and bore rifles with the advent of breech loading and rifling in the late 19th century) included the-4 bore, using a 130-gram (2,000 gr) slug at up to 430 m/s (1,400 ft/s). Despite their enormous power, the short low-velocity slugs still suffered the penetration issues which plagued guns of this era, particularly for the toughest shot of all: defeating the bone mass for a frontal brain shot on an elephant. Thus, dangerous game hunting in the 19th century was as much a test of the gun-bearer's ability to relay guns to the hunter, and of horsemanship to evade charges long enough to reload.

Following the bore guns were the brass case "express" rounds, which incorporated black powder with modern ballistics by making relatively smaller projectiles go faster. The dangerous game projectiles were often hardened lead alloy. The .577 Black Powder Express was the go-to dangerous game caliber from the 1870s through 1900. It spawned the .577 Express around 1890, which used smokeless cordite instead of black powder, and then the .577 Nitro Express in 1900, which used modern metal jacketed and solid bullets pushed by more modern smokeless powders.

It was not until the parallel developments of jacketed projectiles, closely followed by smokeless powders in the late 19th century, that dangerous game could be taken with near 100% certainty.

== Nitro Express rifles ==
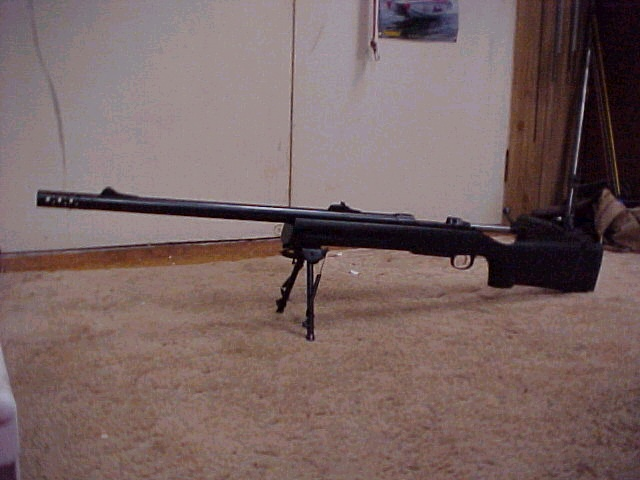
CZ 550 .585 caliber rifle

The Nitro Express line (c.1895), so named because the composition of the early smokeless powders such as Poudre B, ballistite and cordite, were the first of the new order of elephant guns. With smaller metal-jacketed projectiles ranging from 10.2 to 15.7 mm (.400 to .620 in) caliber and velocities around 610 m/s (2,000 ft/s) they possessed vastly improved trajectory and penetration over their black powder forebears. Within a few years the mighty bore guns of the previous era largely disappeared from the gamefields. The safari heyday of the early 20th century "nitro era" records much literature on such calibers as the .577 Nitro Express, .375 H&H Magnum, .416 Rigby, .404 Jeffery, .505 Gibbs, .450 Nitro Express, and .470 Nitro Express. These rifles came out in single shot, bolt action, and double rifle configurations and continued to be used until ivory hunting died off in the mid-20th century. Thereafter, they largely switched roles to tools for game wardens and as back-up firearms for professional hunters guiding international hunters.

The American gun market produced several famous dangerous game cartridges around this time, such as the .458 Winchester Magnum, .378 Weatherby Magnum and .460 Weatherby Magnum and many of these were "wildcatted" (to modify an existing case and rifle to fire a different caliber bullet). The rest of the old Nitro express calibers had faded into obscurity until a resurgence in safari hunting came about in the 1970s and 1980s. This prompted a new boom in elephant gun development and calibers such as the .416 Weatherby Magnum and .416 Remington Magnum arrived in factory offerings. The late 1980s and 1990s produced the .700 Nitro Express and the new brass manufacturers allowed even more powerful elephant guns such as the .585 Nyati by Ross Seyfried, .577 Tyrannosaur by Colonel Art Alphin and .585 Gehringer by Karl Gehringer to be made by wildcatters. The .600 Overkill made by Rob Garnick represents the greatest power available from a standard hunting action. Other wildcats based on the heavy machine gun .50 BMG and similar anti-materiel rounds have been devised which are much more powerful, though they are not generally considered useful hunting arms as their weight usually exceeds 11 kg (25 lb).

== Use in wartime ==
Elephant guns saw use in combat in Africa during the late 19th century; they were carried by elite units of the Mahdist State alongside Remington Rolling Block rifles captured from the Egyptians, used by Boers against the British and the Zulus, the latter also employed them against the British. According to an anonymous account from an English mercenary who served with the Transvaal Republic, during a border skirmish with Swaziland the Swazis employed a 2 bore elephant gun, which reportedly caused several casualties in the Boer ranks.

During World War I, both the British and German armies used elephant guns obtained from their African colonies on the Western Front. The British used elephant guns as a means of countering the German tactic of having their snipers advance towards enemy lines under the cover of a large, 6–10 millimeter (0.24–0.4 inch) thick steel plate. Though normal small arms were ineffective against the plate, elephant guns of the era had enough force to punch through. Additionally, to penetrate steel plate loopholes, large caliber firearms, such as elephant guns, were deployed to eliminate snipers.

In World War II, Prince Amedeo, Duke of Aosta gave his personal collection of elephant rifles to Royal Italian Army troops under his command during the East African campaign. They were used to target British armored cars, as Italian forces suffered from a lack of anti-tank guns during the campaign. The Lahti L-39, a Finnish-made 20 mm caliber anti-tank gun, was nicknamed the norsupyssy (lit. 'elephant gun') by Finnish Army troops during the Continuation War because of its stopping power, the British-made Boys anti-tank rifle was also nicknamed as the elephant gun.

== See also ==
- 9.3x62mm Mauser
- Express rifle
- Java arquebus
- Jiaozhi arquebus
- Wall gun
