= .577/500 No. 2 Black Powder Express =

Rifle cartridge

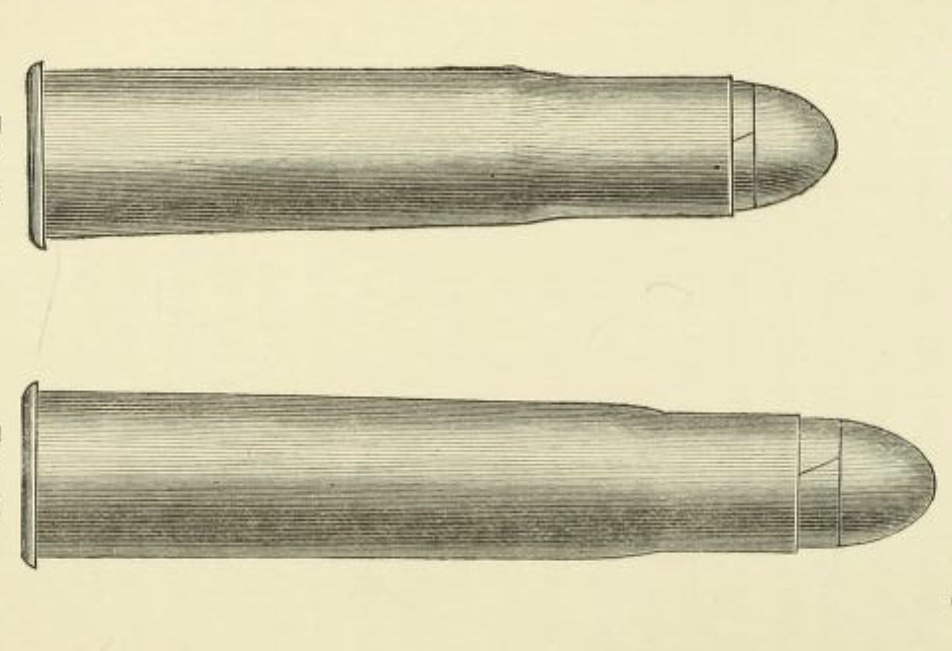
- Illustration of the 2 3/4-inch and 3 1/8-inch .577/500 No 2 Black Powder Express cartridges
- Type: Rifle
- Place of origin: United Kingdom

Production history
- Designed: Before 1879

Specifications
- Case type: Rimmed, bottleneck
- Bullet diameter: .507 in (12.9 mm)
- Neck diameter: .538 in (13.7 mm)
- Shoulder diameter: .560 in (14.2 mm)
- Base diameter: .641 in (16.3 mm)
- Rim diameter: .726 in (18.4 mm)
- Case length: 2.83 in (72 mm)
- Overall length: 3.40 in (86 mm)
- Primer type: Kynoch #31A

Ballistic performance
| Bullet mass/type | Velocity | Energy |
|---|---|---|
| 300 gr (19 g) | 1,870 ft/s (570 m/s) | 2,340 ft⋅lbf (3,170 J) |
| 340 gr (22 g) (factory load) | 1,925 ft/s (587 m/s) | 2,800 ft⋅lbf (3,800 J) |
- Source: "Cartridges of the World"

The .577/500 No. 2 Black Powder Express, also known as the 12.7mm British No. 2, is a British centerfire fire rifle cartridge.

== Development ==
The .577/500 No. 2 BPE was developed as a black powder round some time before 1879 by necking down the .577 Black Powder Express to .507-inches (12.9 mm) for use in single or double rifles, as well as a variety of Martini-based lever rifles.

Like the .450 Black Powder Express, the .577/500 BPE came in several case lengths, the most common having a 3-inch case. A 3 1/8-inch variant would later be loaded with cordite to become the .577/500 Nitro Express.

For some time the .577/500 No. 2 BPE was loaded with cordite to become the .577/500 No. 2 Nitro for Black, the same cartridge loaded with mild loadings of cordite, carefully balanced through trial to replicate the ballistics of the black powder version.

== Use ==
The .577/500 No. 2 BPE was a popular cartridge in India for hunting all thin-skinned game up to tigers. It did not face competition from comparable .450 rounds there in the decades following 1907 due to the ban on British military calibres. Like the .500 Black Powder Express, the .577/500 No. 2 BPE was never popular in Africa, not being powerful enough for thick-skinned game such as elephants.

Moderately popular in its day, the round has long since ceased to be offered commercially.

== See also ==
- 12mm caliber
- Express (weaponry)
- List of rifle cartridges
- List of rimmed cartridges
