= .700 Nitro Express =

Big game rifle cartridge

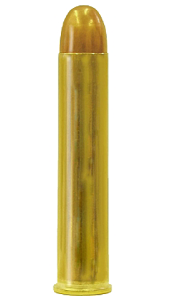
- .700 Nitro Express cartridge
- Type: Big Game Rifle
- Place of origin: United Kingdom

Production history
- Designer: Jim Bell / William Feldstein
- Designed: 1988
- Manufacturer: Holland & Holland
- Produced: 1988–present

Specifications
- Parent case: N/A
- Case type: Rimmed, straight
- Bullet diameter: .700 in (17.8 mm)
- Land diameter: .688 in (17.5 mm)
- Neck diameter: .730 in (18.5 mm)
- Base diameter: .780 in (19.8 mm)
- Rim diameter: .890 in (22.6 mm)
- Rim thickness: .086 in (2.2 mm)
- Case length: 3.50 in (89 mm)
- Overall length: 4.20 in (107 mm)
- Case capacity: 316.9 gr H_{2}O (20.53 cm^{3})
- Primer type: Boxer; Magnum Large Rifle

Ballistic performance
Bullet mass/type	Velocity	Energy
1,000 gr (65 g) SP	2,000 ft/s (610 m/s)	9,000 ft⋅lbf (12,000 J)

The .700 Nitro Express (17.8×89mmR), also known as .700 H&H, is a big-game rifle cartridge. The cartridge is typically charged with around 250 grains of powder, in addition to a two-grain igniter charge (to reduce the tendency of the cartridge to hang fire from such large powder charges). The cartridge was introduced in 1988 by the boutique gunmakers Holland & Holland (H&H) of London. It was developed by Jim Bell and William Feldstein and built by H&H. Feldstein had tried unsuccessfully to get H&H to build a .600 Nitro Express for him, but they had already ceased production. However, when Bell and Feldstein produced an entirely new .700 Nitro Express cartridge, they were able to attract the interest of H&H, which was looking for a new big-bore cartridge. After production began, the backlog of orders was so great that it continued to 2007 and H&H restarted the production of .600 Nitro Express guns.

== Specifications ==
In many respects, this cartridge parallels the .600 Nitro Express. It is essentially a scaled-up version of that cartridge, but is somewhat more powerful, and fires a heavier 1,000-grain (64.8 g) bullet. The case itself is a completely new case, not simply another case resized. Double rifles are extremely expensive, starting at about US $10,000 and selling up to US $260,000 in 2015, and have generally been replaced by repeater-rifles using rounds such as the .458 Winchester Magnum. A new H&H .700 Nitro Express had a retail price of $115,000 in 1990, as of 2022 that price has risen to $400,000.

Single factory loaded .700 Nitro cartridges are available, typically at US$100 each. As of July 2022 Holland & Holland had produced only 17 rifles chambered in .700 Nitro Express, with the 18th rifle being completed and sold by 2024.

== Ballistics ==
The .700 Nitro Express develops an approximate average of 8,900 foot-pounds force (12,100 J) of muzzle energy with a 1,000 gr (65 g) bullet at 2,000 ft/s (610 m/s). Handloaders can push the cartridge to generate as much as 15,000 foot-pounds (20,000 J) of energy in a modern bolt action, by using a 1,000 gr (65 g) bullet fired at 2,600 ft/s (792 m/s). However, doing so necessitates a rifle so heavy it is almost inoperable for hunting purposes. Lathe turned cases as used in the Accurate Reloading rifle above will suffer blown primers at this level though a good source of drawn brass would allow (in theory) velocities up to 2,700 ft/s (820 m/s).

The typical average muzzle velocity of a factory-loaded cartridge is 2,000 ft/s (610 m/s). In the 18-pound (8.2 kg) rifle used by Accurate Reloading this would result in recoil energy of approximately 160 ft⋅lbf (220 J), causing the average shooter's heart to skip a beat. This is more than ten times the average recoil from a .308 Winchester (16 ft-lbs), eight times the recoil of a .30-06 Springfield (20 ft-lbs), and five times the recoil of a strong .45-70 Government (30 ft-lbs), which are all popular big game hunting cartridges; plus four times the recoil of a .375 H&H Magnum (40 ft-lbs) and twice the recoil of the .460 Weatherby (80 ft-lbs), which are both popular for hunting extremely large game, prior to the .700 Nitro the .460 Weatherby was considered the world's most powerful sporting rifle.

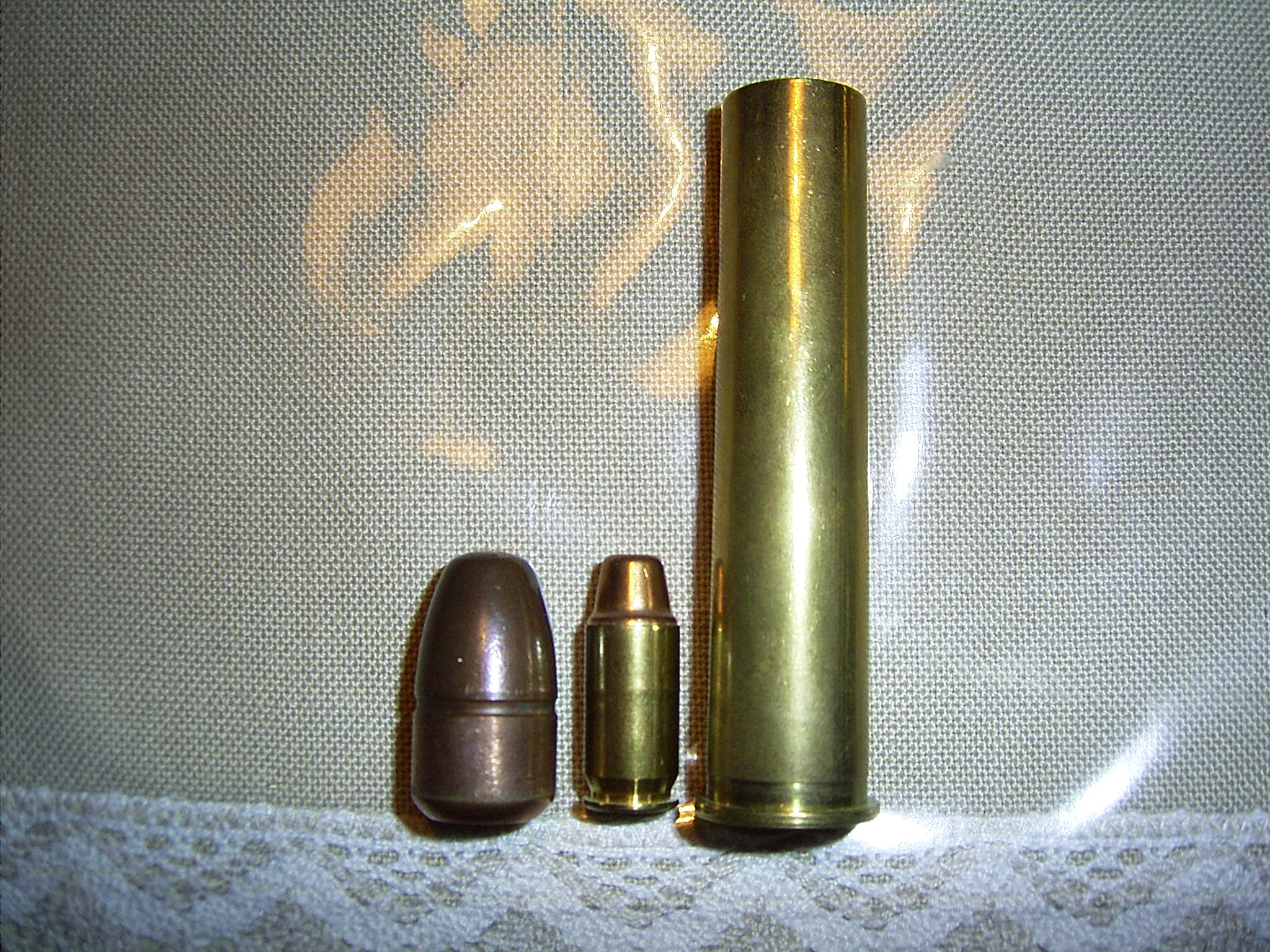
.700 Nitro Express bullet and case with .45 ACP cartridge (centre) for comparison

== Comparable calibers ==
Rifle calibres comparable to the .700 Nitro Express in terms of power and recoil include the following:

- .458 Winchester Magnum
- .460 Weatherby Magnum
- .475 A&M Magnum
- .50 BMG—One of the most powerful rifle rounds, used in anti-materiel rifles
- .577 Tyrannosaur
- .585 Nyati
- .600 Nitro Express
- .600 Overkill
- .950 JDJ—The world's largest rifle cartridge
- 4 bore
- 12.7×108mm
- 14.5×114mm
- 20 mm caliber

== See also ==
- List of rifle cartridges
- List of rimmed cartridges
