= .500/450 No. 1 Black Powder Express =

Rifle cartridge

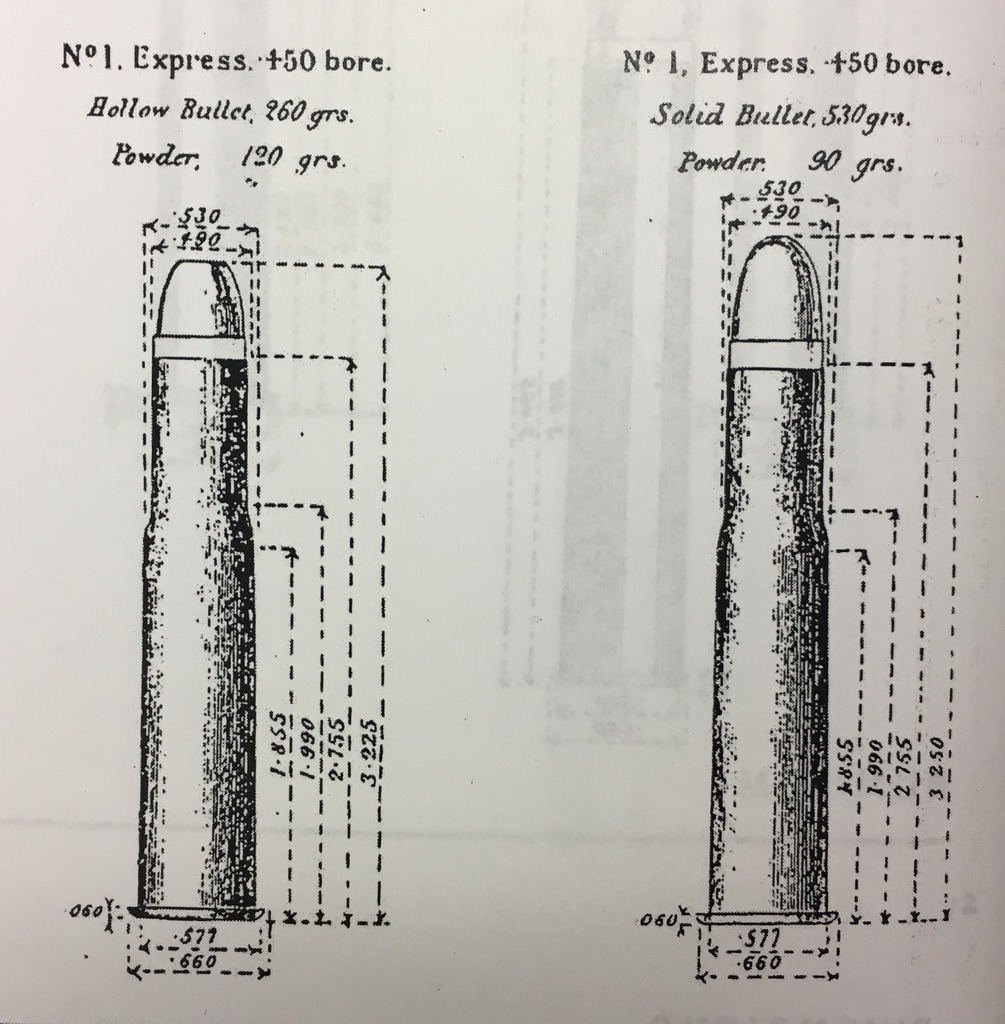
- Page from the 1884 Kynoch catalogue
- Type: Rifle
- Place of origin: United Kingdom

Production history
- Designer: Westley Richards
- Designed: 1870s
- Produced: 1870s

Specifications
- Case type: Rimmed, bottleneck
- Bullet diameter: .458 in (11.6 mm)
- Neck diameter: .485 in (12.3 mm)
- Shoulder diameter: .530 in (13.5 mm)
- Base diameter: .577 in (14.7 mm)
- Rim diameter: .660 in (16.8 mm)
- Case length: 2.75 in (70 mm)
- Overall length: 3.38 in (86 mm)
- Case capacity: 121.3 gr H_{2}O (7.86 cm^{3})
- Primer type: Kynoch # 40

Ballistic performance
Bullet mass/type	Velocity	Energy
260 gr (17 g)	1,900 ft/s (580 m/s)	2,160 ft⋅lbf (2,930 J)
530 gr (34 g)	UNK	UNK
- Sources: Cartridges of the World & Imperial War Museums.

The .500/450 No. 1 Black Powder Express, known in its day as the .500/450 No. 1 Express, was a centerfire rifle cartridge developed by Westley Richards and introduced in the late 1870s.

== Overview ==
The .500/450 No. 1 Black Powder Express was a rimmed, bottlenecked cartridge designed for use with black powder. The cartridge was originally designed as a deer stalking round with a 260 gr (17 g) bullet, although later a 530 gr (34 g) loading was produced for target shooting.

The .500/450 No. 1 Nitro for Black was the same cartridge loaded with mild loadings of cordite, carefully balanced to replicate the ballistics of the black powder version. Unlike other similar black powder cartridges, such as the .450 Black Powder Express and .500/450 Magnum Black Powder Express, the .500/450 No. 1 Express never became a Nitro Express cartridge.

== See also ==
- Express (weaponry)
- List of rifle cartridges
- List of rimmed cartridges
- 11 mm caliber other cartridges of similar caliber size.
