= .577 =

.577 may refer to:

- .577 Black Powder Express, a black powder, centerfire round
- .577 Nitro Express, a rimmed metallic cartridge
- .577 Tyrannosaur, a type of cartridge developed by A-Square in 1993 for big game hunting in Africa
- .577/450 Martini–Henry, a black powder, centerfire round used by the British and British Empire militaries
- .577 Snider, an obsolete cartridge produced around 1867 and replaced in service by the .577/450 Martini–Henry cartridge
- The first three digits in the decimal expansion of Euler's constant, .5772156649...
