= .577/500 Nitro Express =

Rifle cartridge

- Type: Rifle
- Place of origin: United Kingdom

Specifications
- Case type: Rimmed, bottleneck
- Bullet diameter: .508 in (12.9 mm)
- Neck diameter: .526 in (13.4 mm)
- Shoulder diameter: .585 in (14.9 mm)
- Base diameter: .645 in (16.4 mm)
- Rim diameter: .717 in (18.2 mm)
- Rim thickness: .055 in (1.4 mm)
- Case length: 3.13 in (80 mm)
- Overall length: 3.74 in (95 mm)
- Rifling twist: 1:16
- Primer type: .251 (6.38 mm) Berdan (Kynoch #31A)

Ballistic performance
Bullet mass/type	Velocity	Energy
440 gr (29 g)	1,725 ft/s (526 m/s)	2,920 ft⋅lbf (3,960 J)
- Source: "Cartridges of the World"

The .577/500 3 1/8-inch Nitro Express is a British centerfire fire rifle cartridge.

== Development ==
The .577/500 NE was developed by loading a 3 1/8-inch variant of the .577/500 Black Powder Express with smokeless cordite. The latter was developed by necking down the .577 Black Powder Express to .508".

Whilst very similar to the .577/500 No 2 Black Powder Express the two are not interchangeable.

== Use ==
Despite being a similar size, the .577/500 NE is not nearly as powerful as the .500 Nitro Express and is not suitable for such thick-skinned game as elephant. Like the .500 Black Powder Express, the .577/500 NE was never highly regarded for hunting in Africa, yet it was popular in India.

Moderately popular in its day, the round has long since ceased to be offered commercially.

== See also ==
- Nitro Express
- List of rifle cartridges
- List of rimmed cartridges
- 12mm caliber
