= 20/577 Alexander Henry =

Rifle cartridge

- Type: Rifle
- Place of origin: Scotland

Production history
- Designer: Alexander Henry
- Designed: 1895
- Produced: 1895

Specifications
- Parent case: 20 bore
- Case type: Rimmed, bottleneck
- Bullet diameter: .584 in (14.8 mm)
- Neck diameter: .607 in (15.4 mm)
- Shoulder diameter: .674 in (17.1 mm)
- Base diameter: .706 in (17.9 mm)
- Rim diameter: .754 in (19.2 mm)
- Rim thickness: .06 in (1.5 mm)
- Case length: 2.75 in (70 mm)
- Overall length: 3.27 in (83 mm)

Ballistic performance
Bullet mass/type	Velocity	Energy
560 gr (36 g)	UNK	UNK
570 gr (37 g)	1,725 ft/s (526 m/s)	3,770 ft⋅lbf (5,110 J)
- Sources: The big game express & The Spanish Association of Cartridge Collectors

The 20/577 Alexander Henry, also known as 20/577 Express, is an obsolete rifle cartridge.

== Overview ==
The 20/577 Alexander Henry was developed and introduced by the Scottish gunmaker Alexander Henry around 1895 exclusively for his hunting rifles.

The 20/577 Alexander Henry is a rimmed, bottlenecked centerfire rifle cartridge. The 20/577 Alexander Henry is derived from brass 20 bore cartridges necked down to accept a .584 in (14.8 mm) calibre bullet like the .577 Black Powder Express.

The 20/577 Alexander Henry fired a 560 or 570 gr (36 or 37 g) lead, paper patched bullet driven by 6 drams (10.6 g) of blackpowder at 1,725 ft/s (526 m/s), its ballistic performance replicating that of the .577 Black Powder Express 3-inch. Later versions were loaded with mild loadings of cordite, carefully balanced through trial to replicate the ballistics of the blackpowder version, a copper-tubed lead bullet was also available, offering improved performance against dangerous game.

== See also ==
- Express cartridges
- List of rifle cartridges
- 13 mm caliber
