= .600 Nitro Express =

Large bore hunting cartridge

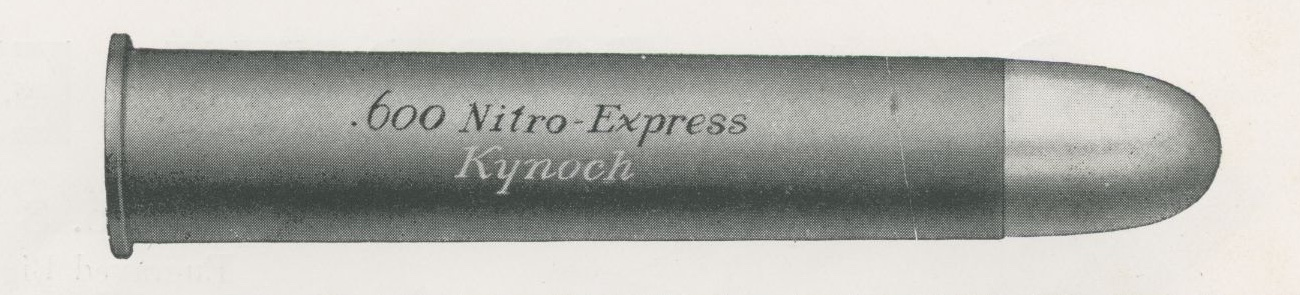
- Type: Rifle
- Place of origin: United Kingdom

Service history
- In service: 1915–1916
- Used by: British Army
- Wars: World War I

Production history
- Designer: W. J. Jeffery & Co.
- Designed: 1899
- Produced: 1900–present

Specifications
- Case type: Rimmed, tapered
- Bullet diameter: .620 in (15.7 mm)
- Land diameter: .606 in (15.4 mm)
- Neck diameter: .648 in (16.5 mm)
- Base diameter: .700 in (17.8 mm)
- Rim diameter: .810 in (20.6 mm)
- Rim thickness: .065 in (1.7 mm)
- Case length: 3 in (76 mm)
- Overall length: 3.70 in (94 mm)
- Case capacity: 211.4 gr H_{2}O (14 cm^{3})
- Primer type: Kynoch No. 40

Ballistic performance
Bullet mass/type	Velocity	Energy
900 gr (58 g)	2,050 ft/s (625 m/s)	8,400 ft⋅lbf (11,389 J)
900 gr (58 g)	1,950 ft/s (594 m/s)	7,600 ft⋅lbf (10,304 J)
900 gr (58 g)	1,850 ft/s (564 m/s)	6,840 ft⋅lbf (9,274 J)
- Test barrel length: 28; Sources: Barnes, Kynoch and C.I.P Data

The .600 Nitro Express (15.7×76mmR) is a large bore Nitro Express rifle cartridge developed by W. J. Jeffery & Co. for the purpose of hunting large game.

== Design ==
The .600 Nitro Express is a slightly tapered walled, rimmed, centerfire rifle cartridge designed for use in single-shot and double rifles.

The cartridge fires a .620 in (15.7 mm) diameter, 900 gr (58 g) projectile with three powder loadings: the standard being 100 gr (6.5 g) of cordite at a muzzle velocity of 1,850 ft/s (560 m/s); a 110 gr (7.1 g) loading which generates a muzzle velocity of 1,950 ft/s (590 m/s); and a 120 gr (7.8 g) loading which generates a muzzle velocity of 2,050 ft/s (620 m/s).

To handle the recoil forces generated by this cartridge, rifles chambered in it typically weigh up to 16 lb (7.3 kg).

== Dimensions ==
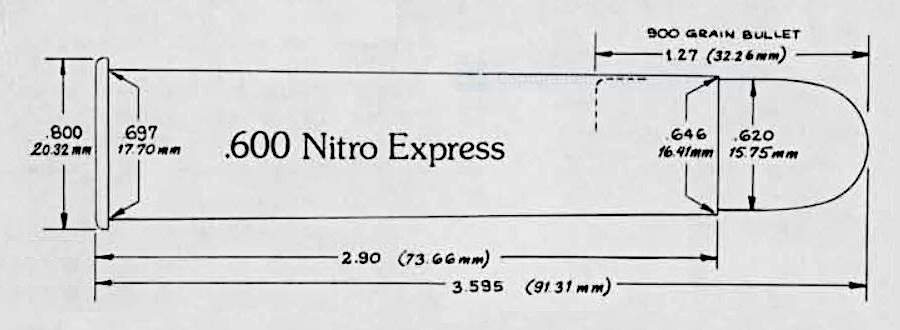

== History ==
The .600 Nitro Express was developed by London gunmakers W. J. Jeffery & Co. Sources vary about the date of its introduction, (Note: The majority of W. J. Jeffery & Co.'s records were lost or destroyed during World War II.) although it would seem in 1900 the first .600 Nitro Express rifle was produced by W. J. Jeffery & Co., a 15 lb (6.8 kg) double barrelled hammer rifle. Jefferys produced around seventy rifles in .600 Nitro Express in four actions, double barrelled hammer break-open, single barrelled break-open, falling block and double barrelled break-open with and without ejectors.

Until the introduction of the .700 Nitro Express in 1988, the .600 Nitro Express was the most powerful commercially available hunting rifle cartridge in the world. Aside from W. J. Jeffery & Co., several gunmakers have made and continue to offer rifles chambering this .600 Nitro Express, although in 2009 it was estimated by Holland & Holland that only around one hundred .600 Nitro Express rifles had ever been produced in that time.

=== WWI service ===
In 1914 and early 1915, German snipers were engaging British Army positions with impunity from behind steel plates that were impervious to .303 British ball ammunition. In an attempt to counter this threat, the British War Office purchased sixty-two large-bore sporting rifles from British rifle makers, including four .600 Nitro Express rifles, which were issued to regiments. These large-bore rifles proved very effective against the steel plates used by the Germans. In his book, Sniping in France 1914-18, Major H. Hesketh-Prichard, DSO, MC stated they "pierced them like butter".

Stuart Cloete, sniping officer for the King's Own Yorkshire Light Infantry, stated "We used a heavy sporting rifle - a .600 Express. These had been donated to the army by big game hunters and when we hit a plate we stove it right in. But it had to be fired standing or from a kneeling position to take up the recoil. The first man who fired it from the prone position had his collar bone broken."

== Use ==
The .600 Nitro Express, along with the .577 Nitro Express, was a specialist backup weapon for professional elephant hunters. Too heavy to be carried all day and used effectively, it was usually carried by a gun bearer. It was used when in thick cover and when an effective shot at the heart and lungs was not possible.

In his African Rifles and Cartridges, John "Pondoro" Taylor says the shock of a head shot from a .600 Nitro Express bullet is enough to knock out an elephant for up to half an hour.

=== Prominent users ===
In the course of his career, Taylor owned and used two .600 Nitro Express double rifles, the first was regulated for 110 gr (7.1 g) loadings, the second was a W. J. Jeffery & Co. double rifle that weighed 16 lb (7.3 kg) with 24 in (610 mm) barrels and was regulated for 100 gr loadings. He states he was very fond of his Jeffery .600 which he used as a second backup rifle to a .400 Jeffery Nitro Express, and with it he killed between 60 and 70 elephants.

Bror von Blixen-Finecke, Karl Larsen and Major Percy Powell-Cotton all used W. J. Jeffery & Co. .600 Nitro Express rifles extensively.

=== Parent case ===
In 1929 Holland & Holland produced the .600/577 Rewa by necking down the .600 Nitro Express to accept a .582 in (14.8 mm) bullet.

The .50 British ammunition used in the Vickers .50 machine gun was initially a necked-down .600 NE.

== Regulation ==
In the United States, a rifle with the bore size of a .600 Nitro Express would normally be classified as a destructive device by the National Firearms Act (NFA), which classifies any firearm with a rifled barrel that has a bore diameter larger than 0.50 inches (12.7 mm) as a destructive device, along with bombs, grenades/grenade launchers, rockets and explosive projectiles. Machine guns, short-barreled rifles, short-barrel shotguns and suppressors are also regulated by the NFA and Title II of the Gun Control Act of 1968, and are strictly regulated by the Bureau of Alcohol, Tobacco, Firearms and Explosives (ATF), requiring federal registration and an enhanced background check. However, the ATF grants exemptions from NFA regulation and registration requirements for large bore rifles if the ATF determines the firearm has a legitimate sporting use and is not likely to be used as a weapon, and therefore is not considered to be a destructive device. Firearms that would otherwise be destructive devices can also potentially be granted NFA exemptions for being an antique if they are more than 50 years old, or if they meet the definition of being a curio or relic (C&R), which is defined as a firearm of special interest to collectors by reason of some quality other than is associated with firearms intended for sporting use or as offensive or defensive weapons, including firearms that are novel, rare, bizarre, or because they are associated with some historical figure, period, or event. Since it was designed for use as a sporting rifle to hunt dangerous game, the .600 Nitro Express qualifies for the sporting clause exception and is not required to be registered as a destructive device under the NFA, it is also classified as a curios or relic by the ATF, as is the .700 Nitro Express. As such it is regulated as a regular Title I firearm under the GCA, requiring a standard background check and completion of a Firearms Transaction Record Form 4473, and as a curios or relic it may also be transferred without a background check to someone with a Type 03 Collector of Curios and Relics Federal Firearms Licence.

== In popular culture ==
In the 1997 film The Lost World: Jurassic Park the character Roland Tembo carries a Searcy Double Barrel Rifle chambered in .600 Nitro Express.

== See also ==
- 13 mm caliber and over
- List of rimmed cartridges
- List of rifle cartridges
- Pfeifer Zeliska .600 Nitro Express revolver
