= Express (weaponry) =

Term applicable to hunting rifles and ammunition

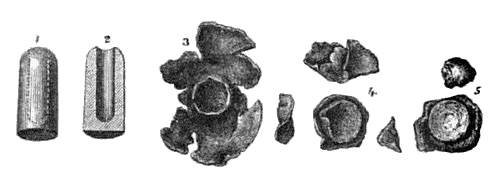
Drawings from 1870 of a hollow point express rifle bullet before firing (1, 2) and after recovery from the game animal (3, 4, 5). The hollow point made the express bullet lighter, faster, and disabled thin-skinned animals more quickly than a solid bullet, at the expense of penetration power and bullet sturdiness.

An express weapon is a hunting rifle chambered to fire ammunition capable of higher than typical velocities. Early express cartridges used a heavy charge of black powder to propel a lightweight, often hollow point bullet, at high velocities to maximize point blank range. Later the express cartridges were loaded with nitrocellulose-based gunpowder, leading to the Nitro Express cartridges, the first of which was the .450 Nitro Express.

Although the term express entered use in the mid-19th century, it is still in use today, applied to rifles, ammunition, and a type of iron sight. With the widespread adoption of small bore, high velocity rifle cartridges, the meaning of express has shifted in modern usage, and refers to high velocity, large bore rifles and ammunition, typically used for hunting large or dangerous game at close range.

== History ==
The name originates with a rifle built by James Purdey in 1856 (based on a pattern established a year earlier by William Greener) and named the Express Train, a marketing phrase intended to denote the considerable velocity of the bullet it fired. It was not the first rifle or cartridge of this type, but it was Purdey's use of express imagery that stuck.

Early hunting firearms were typically smoothbore, usually firing a spherical projectile. This meant that a given bore size must fire a given weight of projectile, which put significant limits on the external and terminal ballistics of the gun. The significant arc of the slow round ball limited the maximum point-blank range to very short distances, and the spherical nature of the ball required a large bore diameter to carry a ball large and heavy enough to provide a quick kill on large game. These early smoothbore guns were typically measured by gauge, as most modern shotguns still are, rather than by caliber. Typical gauges used ranged from 12 gauge to 4 gauge; the 4 gauge was for large game, fired a massive ball of 1500 grains weight (97 g).

In the 19th century, rifled firearms increasingly gained popularity, and the cylindrical (conical) bullet was introduced. This allowed a wide range of bullet weights to be used with a single bore size; the .450 Black Powder Express, for example, was loaded with bullets ranging from a 270 grain hollow point bullet for small game such as deer, to a 360 grain solid bullet for use on dangerous game, to even heavier hardened bullets for use on elephant. The early black powder express cartridges used paper patched lead bullets, to prevent lead buildup in the bore at the high velocities. These bullets were made of soft lead, and even in solid form they expanded readily and provided great killing power.

Typically the trajectory height would not be greater than 4.5 inches at 150 yards (140 m) and the rifle would have a muzzle velocity of at least 1,750 feet per second (533 m/s). While 1,750 ft/s (533 m/s) is not fast by modern standards, it was relatively fast in the era of black powder and spherical balls. As nitro powders were introduced and became the standard, bores grew smaller, and velocities grew ever larger, until the term express grew to mean something other than just high velocity. William Greener, for example, splits British sporting rifles at the turn of the 20th century into four classes:

- Large bore smoothbores, or Elephant guns
- Medium bore high velocity rifles, the express rifle
- Small bore, higher velocity rifles, the long range express rifle
- Miniature, short range rifles, or Rook rifle

Since then, express has gradually changed to denote a large bore diameter combined with high velocity. The 1911 Encyclopaedia Britannica, for example, lists express cartridges ranging from .360 to .577 calibre. The traditional express rifles were break action designs, either single- or double-barrel designs, and express rifles are still made in this form today. With the advent of repeating actions, many bolt-action rifles were chambered in express cartridges, and often the same cartridge will be found in "flanged" and "rimless" form, the flanged for break-open actions, and the rimless for easier feed from a bolt-action rifle's magazine.

Many modern rifle cartridges fire large-calibre, heavy bullets at velocities of well over 2,000 feet per second (600 m/s), and the designation express applies solely to British calibres whereas the word magnum applies to American calibres. With a few exceptions, such the .242 Rimless Nitro Express from the 1920s, and a brief period around 1980 when Remington renamed their .280 Remington cartridge the 7 mm Express Remington, the label express is today used for short range, big game rifles pushing large, fast bullets.

Another item to bear the name express is the iron sight combination, used by William Greener and still found on express rifles today, consisting of a bead front sight and shallow "V" rear sight. The large, usually white bead is easily seen in low light and the shallow "V" notch provides an unobstructed view of the surrounding area.

== Ammunition ==
Traditional express cartridges tend to be long cases, working at low pressures. This is partially due to their black powder roots, but the low pressure cases are also more reliable under extreme conditions, such as found in African hunting. Older designs may be rimmed for break actions or rimless for bolt-action rifles, while modern may use the belted magnum design;. The bullets were typically short, light, hollow-point designs intended for maximum velocity and ranges out to the maximum point blank range with fixed sights. Early cartridges were loaded with black powder, and many later converted to cordite or other smokeless powders, often yielding two similar cartridges with different loadings, such as the .450 Black Powder Express and the .450 Nitro Express. Older express cartridge ballistics are fairly similar to modern shotgun slug ballistics, while modern big game cartridges, such as the .577 Tyrannosaur and the .585 Nyati, provide ballistics that push the physical limits of the hunter with their tremendous power and recoil.

=== Examples ===
There is a large variety of express rounds, including the Nitro Express family of cartridges. Older black powder express cartridges include:

- .450/400 Black Powder Express
- .450 Black Powder Express
- .500/450 No 1 Black Powder Express
- .500/450 Magnum Black Powder Express
- .500 Black Powder Express
- .577/500 No 2 Black Powder Express
- .577 Black Powder Express
- 20/577 Alexander Henry

== Rifle design ==
Express rifles historically came in two forms, singles (single-shot) and doubles (double rifle), both are of break-action designs. The side-by-side double rifle was among the earliest and most popular, but by the early 20th century the bolt action began to replace it. The double rifle has two barrels, either in a side-by-side or over-and-under configuration, and with either a single or double trigger. Most parts of the firing mechanism of the gun are duplicated for the sake of simplicity and redundancy. In the unlikely event that a mechanical failure, such as a broken spring or firing pin should occur, the hunter can still fire the second barrel if necessary. This design allows the hunter to fire two shots in rapid succession, the second shot is used if the animal is missed or not stopped by the first shot. If the hunter were using a bolt-action rifle, he would have to work the bolt, taking additional time and possibly affecting accuracy. Bolt-action rifles for hunting typically have a small magazine of five rounds or less, rather than the ten rounds or more are found on more modern military rifles firing smaller caliber bullets (the maximum number of rounds a hunting rifle can take is fixed by law in many jurisdictions; two in the magazine and one in the chamber is the limit in the United Kingdom)

Modern express rifles are generally either single-shot or bolt-action rifle designs. Doubles are still made but are quite expensive; getting both barrels to shoot to the point of aim is a labor-intensive process. Single-shot rifles are not used as often when hunting dangerous game because follow-up shots are not made as quickly. Single-shot express rifles, such as the Ruger No. 1 Tropical, are more compact than bolt-action rifles, but while they usually weigh less, the reduced weight tends to increase the felt recoil. Lighter rifles are more likely to be in the hunter's hands, ready for a quick shot when game is located.

== See also ==
- James Purdey and Sons
- John Rigby & Company
- Eley Brothers
- Heym (gun manufacturer)
- Holland & Holland
- Westley Richards
- Ugartechea
- Table of handgun and rifle cartridges
