= .500/450 Magnum Black Powder Express =

Centerfire rifle cartridge

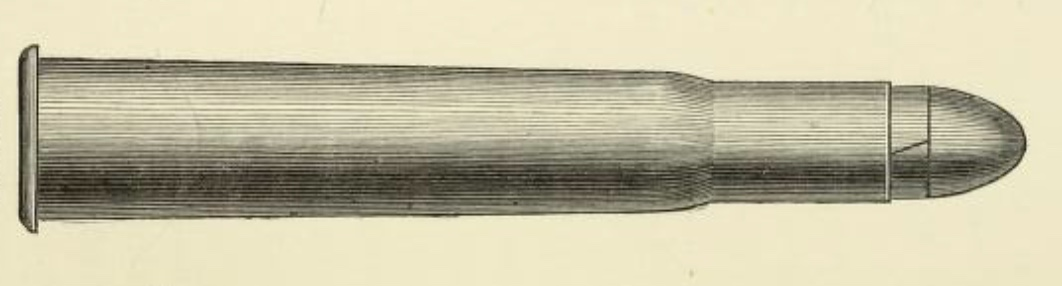
- Type: Rifle
- Place of origin: United Kingdom

Production history
- Produced: 1870s

Specifications
- Parent case: .500 Black Powder Express
- Case type: Rimmed, bottleneck
- Bullet diameter: .458 in (11.6 mm)
- Neck diameter: .479 in (12.2 mm)
- Shoulder diameter: .500 in (12.7 mm)
- Base diameter: .570 in (14.5 mm)
- Rim diameter: .644 in (16.4 mm)
- Case length: 3.25 in (83 mm)
- Overall length: 3.91 in (99 mm)
- Case capacity: 141.4 gr H_{2}O (9.16 cm^{3})
- Primer type: Kynoch # 40

Ballistic performance
Bullet mass/type	Velocity	Energy
325 gr (21 g)	1,950 ft/s (590 m/s)	2,745 ft⋅lbf (3,722 J)
365 gr (24 g)	1,875 ft/s (572 m/s)	2,850 ft⋅lbf (3,860 J)
- Source: "Cartridges of the World"

The .500/450 3 1/4-inch Magnum Black Powder Express, is a centerfire rifle cartridge developed in Britain.

== Development ==
The .500/450 Magnum BPE was created by necking down the .500 Black Powder Express to .45-inches.

For some time after the turn of the century, the .500/450 Magnum BPE was loaded with cordite to become the .500/450 Magnum Nitro for Black, the same cartridge loaded with mild loadings of cordite, carefully balanced through trial to replicate the ballistics of the Black powder version.

== Dimensions ==
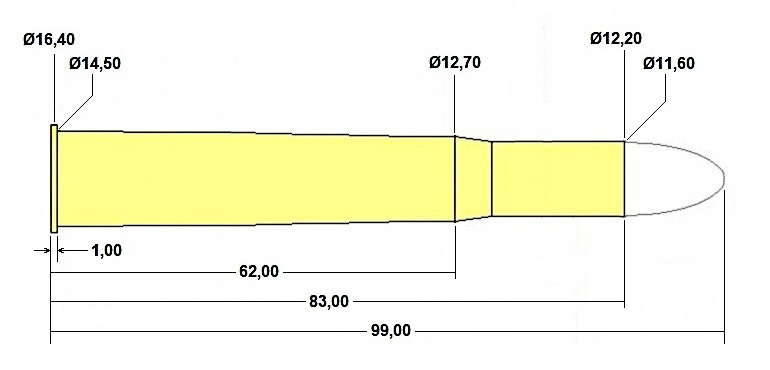

=== Nitro Express loadings ===
In 1898 John Rigby & Company loaded the .450 Black Powder Express cartridge with cordite to create the .450 Nitro Express, the first Nitro Express cartridge. Not to be left behind Holland and Holland followed suit, loading the .500/450 Magnum BPE with cordite to create the .500/450 Nitro Express.

== Use ==
The .500/450 Magnum BPE was a popular cartridge for deer and similarly sized game, particularly in Africa. Available until World War II, the round has long since ceased to be offered commercially.

== See also ==
- Express (weaponry)
- List of rifle cartridges
- 11 mm caliber
