= .577 Nitro Express =

British large-bore centerfire rifle cartridge

.577 Nitro Express 3-inch
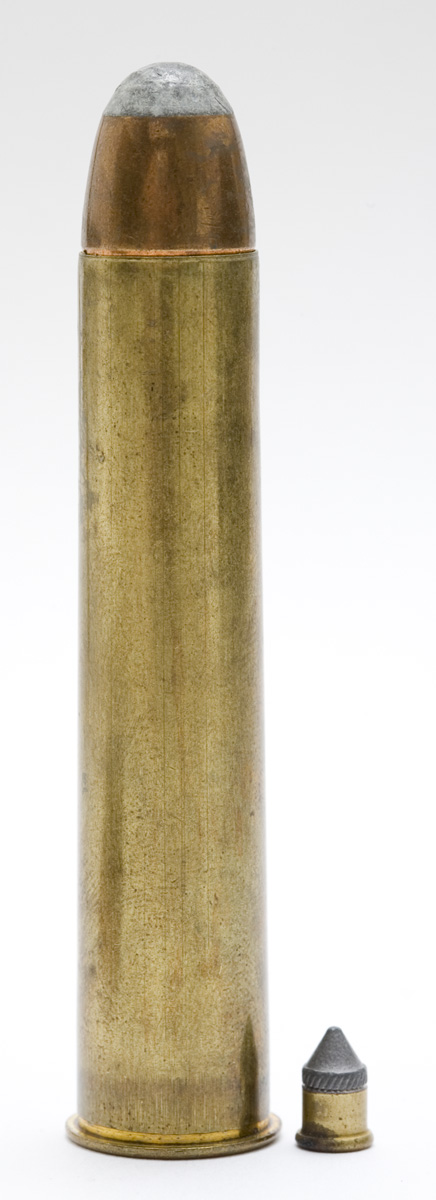
- The .577 Nitro Express is a large small-arms cartridge. In this picture, it is compared to one of the smallest cartridges, a .22 CB.
- Type: Rifle
- Place of origin: United Kingdom

Service history
- In service: 1915–1916
- Used by: British Army
- Wars: World War I

Production history
- Designed: 1890s

Specifications
- Parent case: .577 Black Powder Express
- Case type: Rimmed straight
- Bullet diameter: .585 in (14.9 mm)
- Land diameter: .577 in (14.7 mm)
- Neck diameter: .610 in (15.5 mm)
- Base diameter: .660 in (16.8 mm)
- Rim diameter: .748 in (19.0 mm)
- Rim thickness: .052 in (1.3 mm)
- Case length: 3.00 in (76 mm)
- Overall length: 3.70 in (94 mm)
- Case capacity: 185.3 gr H_{2}O (12.01 cm^{3})

Ballistic performance
Bullet mass/type	Velocity	Energy
750 gr (49 g)	2,050 ft/s (620 m/s)	7,010 ft⋅lbf (9,500 J)
- Test barrel length: 28 in (710 mm); Sources: Barnes and Kynoch

.577 Nitro Express 2 3/4-inch

Ballistic performance
Bullet mass/type	Velocity	Energy
750 gr (49 g)	1,800 ft/s (550 m/s)	5,400 ft⋅lbf (7,300 J)
- Test barrel length: 28 in (710 mm); Source: Kynoch.

The .577 Nitro Express (14.9×70-83mmR) is a large-bore centerfire rifle cartridge designed for the purpose of hunting large game such as elephant. This cartridge is used almost exclusively in single-shot and double express rifles for hunting in the Tropics or hot climates in general and is a cartridge associated with the golden age of African safaris and Indian shikars.

== Design ==
The .577 Nitro Express is a straight rimmed .584-inch (14.8 mm) calibre cartridge designed for use in single-shot and double rifles. It has been made in three case lengths based on their respective black-powder .577 Black Powder Express cartridges.

=== 2 3/4-inch ===
The .577 Nitro Express 2 3/4-inch [70 mm] is a conversion of the .577 Black Powder Express 2 3/4-inch, it fires a 750-grain (49 g) projectile at over 1,800 feet per second (550 m/s). Never as popular as the 3-inch version, today it is only available by special order.

=== 3-inch ===
The .577 Nitro Express 3-inch [76 mm] is a conversion of the .577 Black Powder Express 3-inch, it fires a 750-grain (49 g) projectile at over 2,050 feet per second (620 m/s). This cartridge was to become the most popular of the three and a standard round for African elephant hunters in the early 20th century.

=== 3 1/4-inch ===
The .577 Nitro Express 3 1/4-inch [83 mm] is a conversion of the .577 Black Powder Express 3 1/4-inch, again it was never as popular as the 3-inch version.

== History ==
Following the success of the development in 1898 of the revolutionary .450 Nitro Express by John Rigby & Company, achieved by loading the old .450 Black Powder Express with cordite, similar conversions were made to other blackpowder Express cartridges, including the .577 Black Powder Express in its various case lengths.

Once a standard rifle calibre, the rise of Mauser's Gewehr 98 bolt-action rifles offered cheaper alternatives to the expensive double rifles required by the Nitro Express cartridges. Several manufacturers still make rifles chambered in .577 Nitro Express, including Butch Searcy & Co., Hambrusch Hunting Weapons, Hartmann & Weiss, Heym, Holland & Holland, James Purdey and Sons and Westley Richards.

=== WWI service ===
In 1914 and early 1915, German snipers were engaging British Army positions with impunity from behind steel plates that were impervious to .303 British ball ammunition. In an attempt to counter this threat, the British War Office purchased fifty-two large-bore sporting rifles from British rifle makers which were issued to regiments, including two .577 Nitro Express rifles. These large-bore rifles proved very effective against the steel plates used by the Germans, in his book Sniping in France 1914-18 Major H. Hesketh-Prichard, DSO, MC stated that they "pierced them like butter".

== Use ==
The .577 Nitro Express is suitable for hunting all dangerous game, although it was considered something of a specialist elephant hunter's tool for close-cover hunting and emergencies, the harsh recoil this round produces requires a rifle of 13-pound (5.9 kg) minimum weight. Typically a hunter carried a lighter rifle in a smaller calibre for general hunting whilst a rifle bearer carried a heavy gun such as this, a necessity as an exhausted man could not reliably aim such heavy rifles as these.

In his African Rifles and Cartridges, John "Pondoro" Taylor says the .577 Nitro Express is "a magnificent killer – it literally crumbles up an elephant", further stating the shock of a head shot from a .577 Nitro Express bullet is enough to knock an elephant out for up to 20 minutes.

=== Prominent users ===
James H. Sutherland, who over the course of his life shot between 1,300 and 1,600 elephants, stated in his The Adventures of an Elephant Hunter, "after experimenting with and using all kinds of rifles, I find the most effective to be the double .577 with a 750 grains bullet and a charge in Axite powder equivalent to a hundred grains of cordite." And further stating "I think the superiority of the .577 over the .450 and .500 rifles, will be evident when I state that I have lost elephants with these last two rifles, while I have bagged others with identically the same shots from a .577."

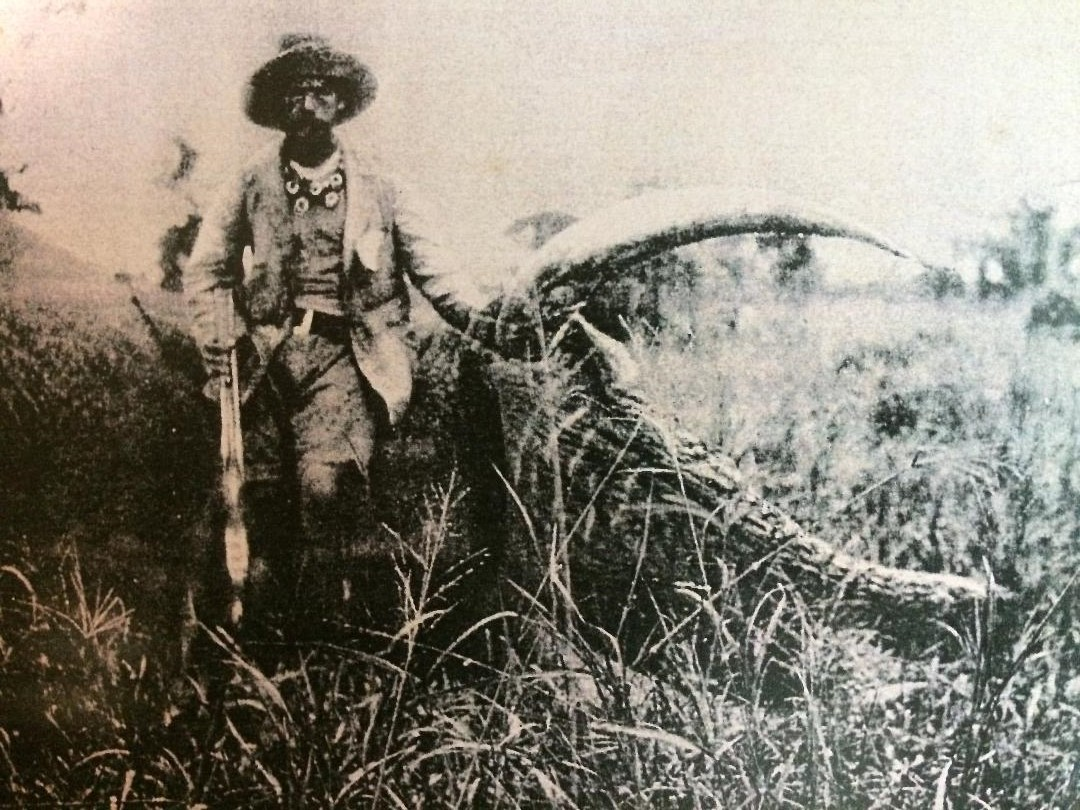
Pete Pearson with elephant shot with his .577 Nitro Express double rifle

Other famous African users include Major G.H. Anderson (shot between 350 and 400 elephants), Deaf Banks (shot over 1,000 elephants), Quentin Grogan, John A. Hunter (shot more than 1,000 rhinoceros) and Pete Pearson (shot over 2,000 elephants).

"Pondoro" Taylor used a Westley Richards .577 Nitro Express double rifle, stating "it did great work for me amongst elephant, rhino and buffalo; it's much too powerful for anything lighter." He parted with the rifle after only a short period because the single-trigger mechanism was unlike all of his other rifles.

Ernest Hemingway and Alfred Józef Potocki both owned Westley Richards Droplock .577 Nitro Express double rifles, Stewart Granger owned two including Potocki's rifle.

=== Parent case ===
- .585 Nyati - developed by turning out the rim and blowing out straight walls of the .577 Nitro Express to allow formation of enough of a shoulder for headspace purposes, making it a "rimless" version.
- .600/570 JDJ - developed by straightening the taper of the .577 Nitro Express to accept .620-inch (15.7 mm) diameter bullets from the .600 Nitro Express.

== See also ==
- 13 mm caliber
- List of rifle cartridges
- List of rimmed cartridges
