= CZ 550 =

CZ-550
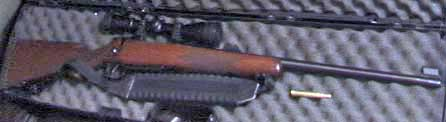
- CZ-550 American Safari in .375 H&H. (Shown with Leupold VX-2 scope)
- Type: Bolt-action rifle
- Place of origin: Czech Republic

Production history
- Manufacturer: Česká zbrojovka Uherský Brod, CZ-USA

Specifications
- Mass: various, see article
- Length: various, see article
- Barrel length: various, see article
- Caliber: various, see article
- Action: bolt action square bridge
- Feed system: 3–5 shot internal or detachable box magazine
- Sights: iron sights or aiming optics

The CZ-550 is a bolt-action hunting rifle series manufactured by Česká zbrojovka Uherský Brod (CZ UB). The CZ 550 series is available with a medium or magnum sized action. The CZ 550 rifle is based on the Mauser 98 rifle.

As the CZ 550 magnum action can be chambered for super magnum cartridges some elephant gun wildcat cartridges were tested and others specially designed (see .600 Overkill) with and for this action.

== Design details ==
As a modern civilian offspring of the Karabiner 98k service rifle the CZ 550 series offers several features and factory options, that are also typical for sporterised Mauser Karabiner 98k ex-service rifles, ranging from various technical departures from the basic Mauser service rifle on to luxury wood grades. Some of the available options were originally developed and introduced by John Rigby & Co. on Rigby Mauser hunting rifles.

=== Operating mechanism ===
The operating mechanism of the CZ 550 series is based on the Mauser M 98 controlled-feed bolt action system. The original Mauser M 98 is a simple, strong, safe, and well-thought-out design that inspired other military and hunting/sporting rifle designs that became available during the 20th century. For the CZ 550 series the action system is machined out of high-grade steel. It also features a double square bridge for mounting a telescopic sight.

=== Features ===
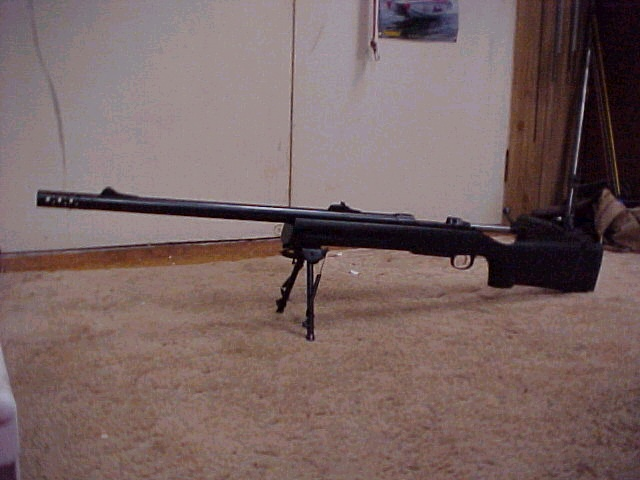
CZ 550 elephant gun/stopper rifle chambered for the .585 Gehringer wildcat cartridge.

The CZ 550 system consists of a receiver that serves as the systems shroud and a bolt group of which the bolt body has three locking lugs, two large main lugs at the bolt head and a third safety lug underneath the bolt handle acting as a backup. The bolt handle is permanently attached to the bolt and is turned-down and backwards for use with optical sights.

Another distinctive feature of the CZ 550 system is the controlled-feed mechanism, consisting of a large, non-rotating claw extractor that engages the cartridge case rim as soon as the round leaves the magazine and firmly holds the cartridge case until the round is ejected by the ejector, mounted inside the receiver. The CZ 550 bolt action will cycle correctly irrespective of the way the rifle is moved or positioned during the bolt cycling action or if the cartridge has been fired or not. Only if the bolt is not brought back far enough, sharply enough, in a controlled round feed bolt action the cartridge case may not be cleanly ejected and a jam may result.

The bolt houses the firing pin mechanism that visually and tactilely protrudes from the rear of the bolt indicating if the action is cocked or not. A small disassembly button offers the possibility to access the firing pin and spring.

The action features a large gas relief hole at the bolt body designed to protect the user's head in case of a primer or cartridge rupture or detonation. When the action suffers a catastrophic failure it is designed to deflect the debris away from the operator's face.

The CZ 550 bolt group can be easily removed from the receiver simply by pushing the disassembly button, located at the left wall of the receiver, and then by rotating and pulling the bolt out.

=== Safety ===
A horizontal two-position safety is mounted on the right side just behind the bolt system. The safety locks the bolt and sear. The user interface consists of a rather compact grooved button that should ensure good operability of the safety with low mounted aiming optics.

=== Trigger ===
The single set trigger on a CZ-550 operates as a single stage during normal operation. However, when it is desirable to have less trigger pull, such as for longer range or very accurate shooting, the trigger can be pushed forward, making it a set trigger. These rifles are factory set with the trigger pull set at approximately 15 N (3.4 lb_{f}) in standard mode and approximately 7 N (1.6 lb_{f}) in the set mode. Both settings are adjustable.

=== Barrel ===
The rifles have hammer forged steel barrels. The twist rate is caliber specific.

=== Ammunition feeding ===
For some models the internal magazine of the CZ 550 series M 98 system consists of an integral box machined to match the cartridge for which the rifle was being chambered, with a detachable floorplate, that can hold up to 5 standard sized rifle cartridges. Other models are fed by detachable box magazines, that can hold up to four standard-sized rifle cartridges. The detachable magazines are released by a magazine release located at the front of the trigger guard.

=== Sights ===
Depending on the model various open sight are mounted as standard. All CZ 550 receivers, except the Minnesota and Scandinavia models, have a 19 mm dovetail rail milled into the top of the front and rear of the receiver as factory preparation for telescopic sight mounts (bases in square bridge) or complete mounts for telescopic sights with or without a mounting rail.

=== Stock ===
The stocks vary from model to model and can be made out of wood or polymers. On CZ 550 MAGNUM STANDARD, HA 550 HUNTER, CZ 550 MAGNUM LUX and CZ 550 SAFARI MAGNUM models one or two steel cross bolts are mounted to distribute the forces and hence the effects of recoil on the stock bedding, reducing the chance to split the stock.

== Variants ==
The CZ-550 rifle is available in two basic variants. These variants technically differ in the size (length and other dimensions) of the action. These variants are offered in several versions.

=== Medium size action ===
Standard
This is the basic version of this rifle series. Available in .243 Winchester and .308 Winchester with a 4-round detachable magazine or .308 Winchester, 7×64mm and .30-06 Springfield with a 4-round fixed magazine. , with a two-position safety, adjustable set trigger, open sights, ventilated rubber butt plate, and 1 inch sling swivels. It is mounted in a PUR lacquer stock with a semi-matte finish.
The Standard weighs 3.3 kg (7.3 lb) is 1,135 mm (44.69 in) long and has a 600 mm (23.62 in) barrel.

Scandinavia
The same rifle as the Standard version, with the addition of a Monte Carlo type walnut stock with a raised comb provided with checkerings and a rubber decelerator buttplate. The chambering palette is .243 Winchester, .270 Winchester, .308 Winchester, 7×64mm, 6.5×55mm and .30-06 Springfield with a 4-round fixed magazine.

Lux
The same rifle as the Standard version, with the addition of a Bavarian cheek piece. The chambering palette is .243 Winchester, .308 Winchester and .22-250 Remington with a 4-round detachable magazine or .243 Winchester, .270 Winchester, .308 Winchester, 7×64mm, 6.5×55mm, .30-06 Springfield and 8×57mm IS with a 5-round fixed magazine.

Medium Lux
The same rifle as the LUX version chambered for larger cartridges. The chambering palette is .300 Winchester Magnum with a 3-round detachable magazine or .300 Winchester Magnum, 7 mm Remington Magnum or 9.3×62mm with a 3-round fixed magazine.

American
This rifle features a classic American pattern stock with reduced drop at heel, 18 LPI checkering, sporter weight hammer forged barrel and a single-set trigger. There is also a Kevlar reinforced polymer stock available. This rifle is designed for aiming with optical sights only. The CZ 550 American is supplied with 1” steel scope rings. The chambering pallet is .243 Winchester, .308 Winchester and .22-250 Remington with a 4-round detachable magazine (a limited run in .300 Winchester Short Magnum was also available) or .270 Winchester, 6.5×55mm, .30-06 Springfield and 9.3×62mm with a 5-round fixed magazine.
The American weighs 3.4 kg (7.5 lb) is 1,135 mm (44.69 in) long and has a 600 mm (23.62 in) barrel.

FS
The FS comes with a Mannlicher-style full-length wood stock, made of Turkish walnut. The chambering palette is .243 Winchester and .308 Winchester with a 4-round detachable magazine or .243 Winchester, .270 Winchester, 7×64mm, 6.5×55mm, .30-06 Springfield, 8×57mm IS and 9.3×62mm with a 5-round fixed magazine.
The FS weighs 3.3 kg (7.3 lb) is 1,055 mm (41.54 in) long and has a 520 mm (20.47 in) barrel.

Battue Lux
The same rifle as FS, except that the sights are Battue type and the stock is not full length. This rifle is intended for shooting moving game at shorter than average distances. The chambering palette is 7×64mm, .30-06 Springfield and 9.3×62mm with a 5-round fixed magazine.
The Battue Lux weighs 3.5 kg (7.7 lb) is 1,055 mm (41.54 in) long and has a 520 mm (20.47 in) barrel.

Varmint
The Varmint features a walnut stock without cheekpiece, with reduced drop at heel, furnished with checkering and a ventilated rubber buttplate. There is also an Aramid composite reinforced polymer stock available. A heavy hammer forged barrel together with the shape of stock predisposes this rifle for shooting with optical aiming devices only. The chambering palette is .308 Winchester and .22-250 Remington with a 3-round detachable magazine.
The VARMINT weighs 4.2 kg (9.3 lb) is 1,085 mm (42.72 in) long and has a 650 mm (25.59 in) barrel.

Varmint-Laminated
The same rifle as the Varmint model with a more weather resistant laminated wooden stock with reduced drop at the heel, Monte Carlo style cheekpiece and with a strengthened fore-end.

HA 550 Hunter or Ultimate Hunting Rifle
The HA 550 Hunter is primarily engineered for shooting at long distances having high accuracy of fire. The high precision is achieved by applying advanced manufacturing technologies to exacting standards. The stock is made from hand-picked walnut wood. This rifle comes with one-piece dural telescopic sight mount with a 30 mm diameter. The only available chambering is .300 Winchester Magnum with a 4-round fixed magazine.
The HA 550 Hunter weighs 3.95 kg (8.7 lb) is 1,135 mm (44.69 in) long and has a 600 mm (23.62 in) barrel.

CZ 750 Sniper
The CZ 750 Sniper is primarily engineered for precise target shooting up to 800 m (875 yd). Though a member of the CZ 700 rifle family this rifle is based on the 550 standard action. The rifle has a synthetic thumb hole stock that is adjustable for comb height as well as length of pull. The underside of the fore-end is fitted with a 220 mm long rail that provides an attachment point for a bipod. Two optical sight mounting options are available. A Weaver rail mount comes installed, or by removing the rail, the integrated CZ 19 mm dovetail may be used. The CZ 750 SNIPER also features a muzzle brake, thread protector, mirage band and two 10-round detachable magazines. The only available chambering is .308 Winchester/7.62×51 mm NATO.
The CZ 750 Sniper weighs 5.4 kg (11.9 lb), is 1,200 mm (47.24 in) long and has a 660 mm (25.98 in) barrel.

=== Magnum size action ===
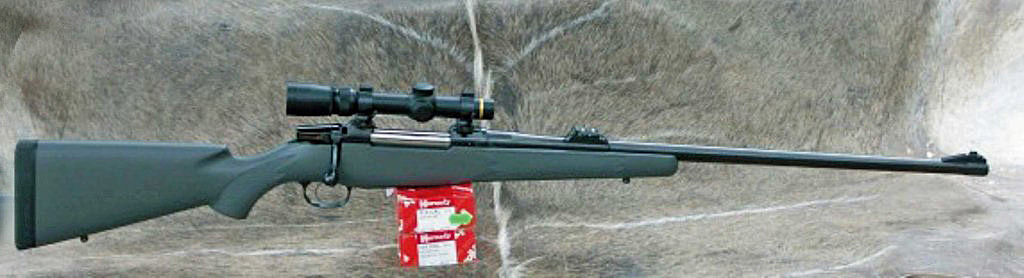
CZ 550 SAFARI MAGNUM with McMillan CZ Express fiberglass aftermarket stock

The magnum-sized action is a magnum variant of the CZ 550 intended for big-game and safari hunting. This action can be chambered for cartridges found in elephant guns. These cartridges are dimensionally larger compared to regular magnum rifle cartridges.

Standard
This rifle is the basic magnum size version fitted with walnut wood stock without cheekpiece, furnished with checkering and ventilated rubber buttplate. The stock type allows aiming both with open sights and aiming optics. Available in .375 Holland & Holland, .416 Rigby and .458 Winchester Magnum with a 5, 3 and 4-round fixed magazine. The Standard weighs 4.2 kg (9.3 lb) is 1,180 mm (46.46 in) long and has a 635 mm (25.00 in) barrel.

Lux
The same rifle as the STANDARD version, with the addition of a Bavarian cheek piece. It is available in .375 Holland & Holland, .416 Rigby, .458 Lott and .458 Winchester Magnum with a 5-, 3-, 3- or 4-round fixed magazine.

SAFARI MAGNUM
The SAFARI MAGNUM special features include express sights (1 standing, 2 folding), hammer forged barrel and single set trigger. The stock is made from select walnut wood and has a classic safari shape with rubber Pachmayr butt plate to reduced felt recoil. This model is specifically designed for heavy and dangerous game hunting. Available in .375 Holland & Holland, .416 Rigby, .458 Winchester Magnum, and .458 Lott with a 5, 3 and 3-round fixed magazine.

AMERICAN SAFARI MAGNUM
The same rifle as the SAFARI MAGNUM version, but offered by CZ USA in an American pattern stock available in 3 different laminate color combinations, as well as field and fancy grade American black walnut. There is also an Aramid composite reinforced polymer stock available.

H.E.T
The H.E.T. model is a CZ USA model intended for long range shooting with a Bell & Carlson tactical Kevlar reinforced stock with a full length aluminum bedding block, a bull barrel, and a SureFire muzzle brake. An oversized bolt handle adds to the ergonomics of the H.E.T. model. Available in .300 Winchester Magnum, .300 Remington Ultra Magnum and .338 Lapua Magnum with a 5, 5 and 4-round fixed magazine. The weights and overall and barrel length of the H.E.T. vary with chambering.

=== Safari Classics ===
These rifles are based on the CZ 550 standard and magnum sized actions. CZ USA offers with this series semi custom and custom-built rifles intended for big-game and safari hunting. The Express Rifle uses the standard size CZ 550 action and the Magnum Express Rifle uses the CZ 550 Magnum action.

For the standard-length action the standard chambering palette is .270 Winchester, .30-06 Springfield, .300 Winchester Magnum, .338 Winchester Magnum, 9.3×62mm, .375 Ruger, .416 Ruger, .416 Taylor and .425 Westley Richards. For the magnum length action the standard chambering palette is .300 Holland & Holland, .338 Lapua Magnum, .375 Holland & Holland, .404 Jeffery, .416 Remington Magnum, .450 Rigby, .500 Jeffery and .505 Gibbs. The rifles chambered in .505 Gibbs and .500 Jeffery include a mercury recoil reducer installed in the stock. An American Safari Magnum in .458 Lott was found to have a pre-drilled cylindrical opening (empty in this case) in its walnut stock when the recoil pad was removed for measurement. It may be a simple matter to insert an appropriate recoil reducing device into such an opening. Since these rifles offer many options and can be built to individual customer specifications the weights and overall and barrel lengths vary. The range of possible chamberings is wider than for other CZ 550 rifles and not limited to the above-mentioned standard chambering palette.

== See also ==
- List of firearms
