= CZ 700 sniper rifle =

CZ 700
- Type: Sniper rifle
- Place of origin: Czech Republic

Production history
- Manufacturer: Česká zbrojovka Uherský Brod (CZ)

Specifications
- Mass: 6.2 kg empty (CZ 700); 5.4 kg empty(CZ 700M1)
- Length: 1215 mm (CZ 700) 1142 mm (CZ 700M1)
- Barrel length: 610 mm
- Cartridge: 7.62×51mm NATO
- Action: Bolt-action
- Feed system: 10-round detachable box magazine

The CZ 700 is a bolt-action sniper rifle designed and manufactured in the Czech Republic by the Česká zbrojovka Uherský Brod (CZ) company.

It is currently being replaced by the CZ 750 model.

== Variants ==
The CZ 700M1 model is slightly lighter and shorter than the standard model.
