= .450/400 Nitro Express =

Rifle cartridge

.450/400 Nitro Express (3 1/4-inch)
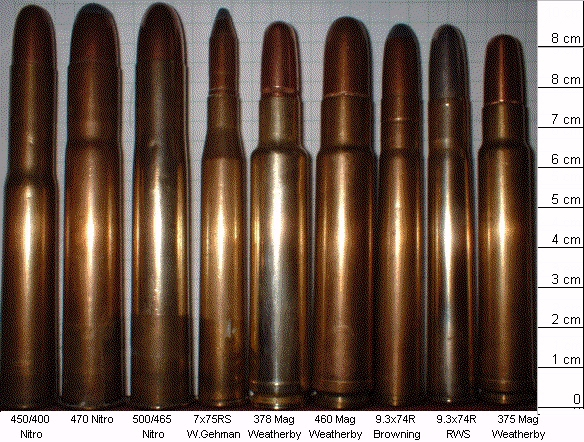
- .450/400 3 1/4 inch Nitro Express in a line up.
- Type: Rifle
- Place of origin: United Kingdom

Production history
- Designer: Kynoch, Jeffery, and others
- Designed: 1899
- Manufacturer: Various
- Produced: 1899–present

Specifications
- Parent case: .450/400 Black Powder Express
- Case type: Rimmed, bottleneck
- Bullet diameter: .405 in (10.3 mm)
- Neck diameter: .432 in (11.0 mm)
- Shoulder diameter: .502 in (12.8 mm)
- Base diameter: .544 in (13.8 mm)
- Rim diameter: .614 in (15.6 mm)
- Rim thickness: .042 in (1.1 mm)
- Case length: 3.25 in (83 mm)
- Overall length: 3.85 in (98 mm)
- Primer type: Kynoch #40

Ballistic performance
Bullet mass/type	Velocity	Energy
400 gr (26 g)	2,150 ft/s (660 m/s)	4,110 ft⋅lbf (5,570 J)
- Test barrel length: 26 inches Sources: Kynoch & Barnes

The .450/400 Nitro Express is a Nitro Express rifle cartridge that is produced in three case lengths: 2 3/8-inches, 3 inches and 3 1/4-inches, and is intended for use in single shot and double rifles. The 3-inch and 3 1/4-inch versions are considered classic Nitro Express cartridges.

== Development ==
Both the .450/400 2 3/8-inch NE and .450/400 3 1/4-inch NE were created by loading the .450/400 Black Powder Express cartridges of both case lengths with smokeless cordite.

=== .450/400 2 3/8-inch Nitro Express ===
The .450/400 2 3/8 inch Nitro Express was loaded with a 400 gr. RN bullet with 42 or 43 grains of cordite, and meant for use in newer rifles chambered for it, as this loading generates greater pressure than the Black Powder Express versions of the cartridge.

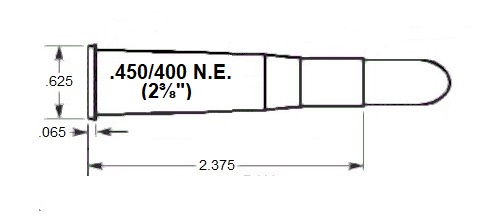

=== .450/400 3-inch Nitro Express ===
This cartridge is better known as the .400 Jeffery Nitro Express.

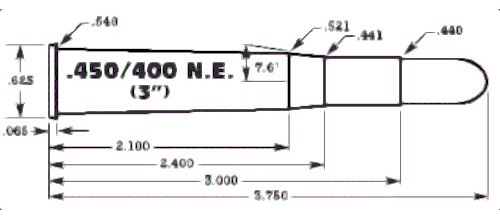

=== .450/400 3 1/4-inch Nitro Express ===
The .450/400 3 1/4-inch NE conversion was not initially entirely successful, under the increased pressures of the cordite loading the long neck could stick in the chamber causing the rim to pull off at extraction, a problem not encountered under the milder black powder loadings. To counter this, the rim was increased in thickness to .042-inches. W. J. Jeffery & Co. further improved the cartridge by reducing the length of the case to 3-inches and moving the neck further forward, creating the .450/400 3-inch NE.

Additionally, the caliber had to be standardised, slight variations existed in both the rifles and the low-pressure black powder cartridges produced by different manufacturers, the bullet diameter is nominally given as .405 inches, bore as large as .411 existed, not a significant problem in black-powder rifles. In Nitro Express loadings, an undersized bullet in an oversized bore may experience accuracy issues while an oversized bullet fired in an undersized bore may cause a catastrophic failure in the firearm.

The .450/400 3 1/4-inch Nitro Express fires a 400 gr. jacketed bullet ahead of a charge of 56 - 60 gr. of cordite at a velocity of 2,150 ft/s (660 m/s). This cartridge is considered unsafe to use for older rifles chambered for the black powder version of this cartridge due to higher pressures generated by this loading. .450/400 3 1/4-inch Nitro Express rifles are heavier and were considered as the minimum cartridge necessary when hunting dangerous game.

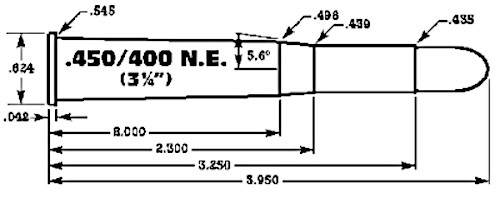

== Use ==
The .450/400 NE in both the 3-inch and 3 1/4-inch versions were extremely popular in Africa and India, prior to the introduction of the .375 Holland & Holland they were considered the best all-round African hunting caliber. Both cartridges were extremely popular in India with Maharajas and British sportsmen for hunting tiger.

In his African Rifles and Cartridges, John "Pondoro" Taylor stated the 3-inch and 3 1/4-inch .450/400 NE were adequate for all African game in almost all conditions when used by an experienced hunter.

== See also ==
- Nitro Express
- List of rifle cartridges
- 10 mm caliber other cartridges of similar caliber size.
