= .450/400 Black Powder Express =

Rifle cartridge

.450/400 3 1/4 inch Black Powder Express
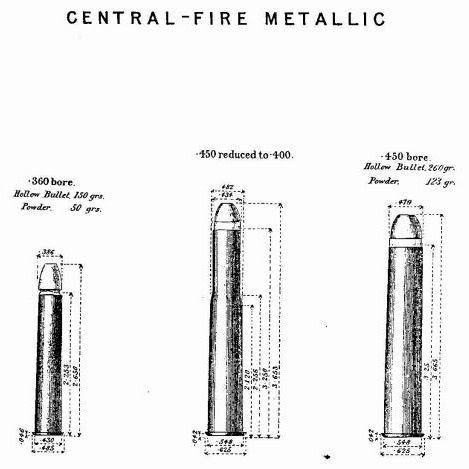
- Drawing of .360, .450/400 & .450 Black Powder Express cartridges
- Type: Rifle
- Place of origin: United Kingdom

Production history
- Designed: 1880s

Specifications
- Parent case: .450 Black Powder Express
- Case type: Rimmed, bottleneck
- Bullet diameter: .405 in (10.3 mm)
- Neck diameter: .432 in (11.0 mm)
- Shoulder diameter: .502 in (12.8 mm)
- Base diameter: .544 in (13.8 mm)
- Rim diameter: .615 in (15.6 mm)
- Rim thickness: .040 in (1.0 mm)
- Case length: 3.25 in (83 mm)
- Overall length: 3.85 in (98 mm)
- Primer type: Kynoch # 40

Ballistic performance
Bullet mass/type	Velocity	Energy
270 gr (17 g) Lead	1,850 ft/s (560 m/s)	2,050 ft⋅lbf (2,780 J)
- Test barrel length: 26 inches (660 mm); Sources: Barnes & Kynoch.

.450/400 2 3/8 inch Black Powder Express

Specifications
- Case length: 2.375 in (60.3 mm)

Ballistic performance
Bullet mass/type	Velocity	Energy
270 gr (17 g) Lead	1,650 ft/s (500 m/s)	1,630 ft⋅lbf (2,210 J)

The .450/400 Black Powder Express cartridges were black powder rifle cartridges introduced in the United Kingdom in the 1880s.

== Design ==
The .450/400 Black Powder Express cartridges are bottlenecked centerfire black powder express rifle cartridges produced in two case lengths, 2 3/8 inches (60.3 mm) and 3 1/4 inches (83 mm). Both cartridges were later loaded as "Nitro for Black" cartridges, the same cartridges loaded with mild loadings of cordite carefully balanced through trial to replicate the ballistics of the black powder versions.

=== .450/400 2 3/8 inch Black Powder Express ===
The .450/400 2 3/8 inch Black Powder Express was loaded with a bullets from 210 to 270 grains (14 to 17 g) driven by 79 to 84 grains (5.1 to 5.4 g) of black powder. The .450/400 2 3/8 inch Nitro for Black was loaded with a jacketed 270 grain round nose bullet driven by 38 grains (2.5 g) of cordite.

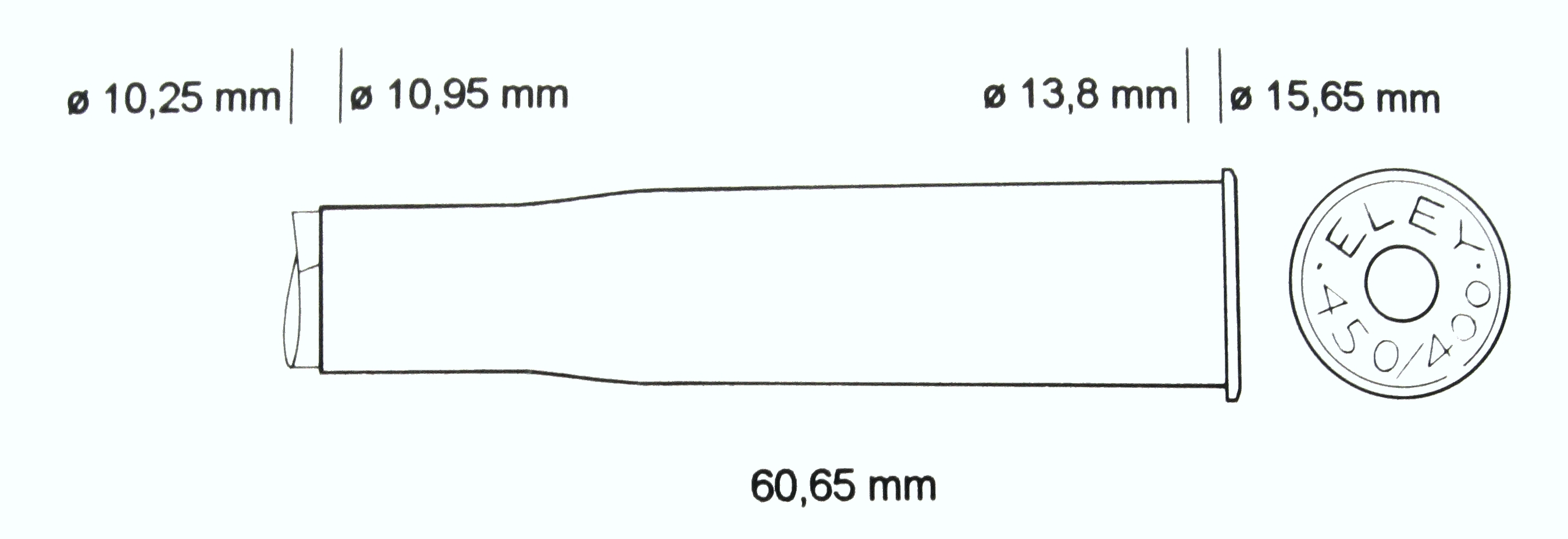

=== .450/400 3 1/4 inch Black Powder Express ===
The .450/400 3 1/4 inch Black Powder Express was loaded with a bullets from 230 to 300 grains (15 to 19 g) driven by 110 grains (7.1 g) of black powder. The .450/400 3 1/4 inch Nitro for Black was loaded with bullets of 270 to 316 grains (17.5 to 20.5 g) driven by 45 to 48 grains (2.9 to 3.1 g) of cordite.

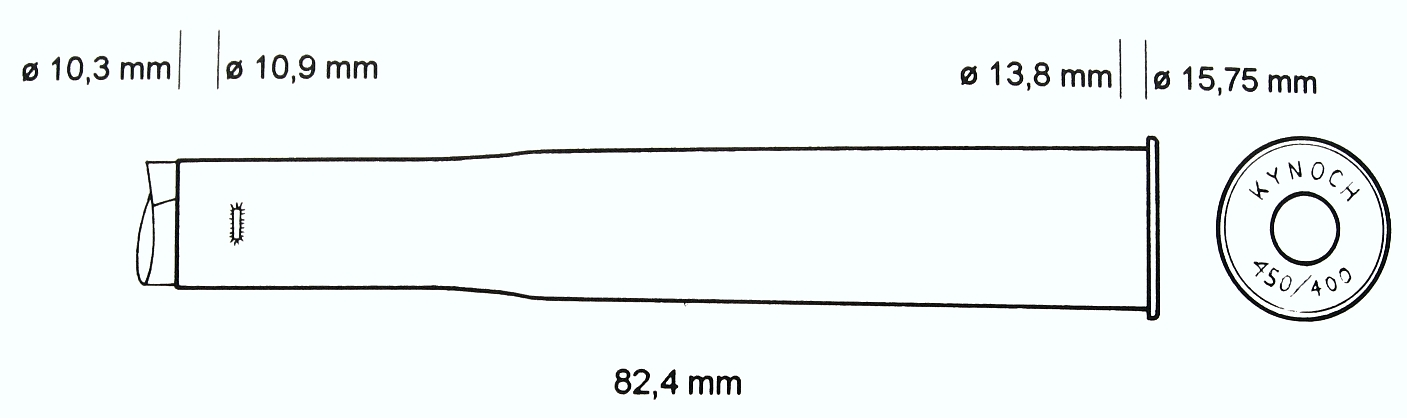

=== Nitro Express loadings ===
The .450/400 Black Powder Express cartridges served as the parent cases for the .450/400 Nitro Express cartridges, the same cartridge cases loaded with greater loads of cordite and heavier bullets to produce far more powerful rounds.

== History ==
The .450/400 Black Powder Express in both cartridge lengths were developed in the 1880s by necking down the .450 Black Powder Express, the .450/400 2 3/8 inch Black Powder Express simply a shortened version. The .450/400 3 1/4 inch Black Powder Express was listed in the Kynoch catalogue of 1884 as the .450 reduced to . 400.

Whilst obsolete, .450/400 3 1/4 inch Black Powder Express ammunition can still be purchased from ammunition manufacturers such as Kynoch.

== Use ==
The .450/400 Black Powder Express in both case lengths were considered good deerstalking cartridges and was usually chambered in a lightweight stalking rifle.

== See also ==
- Express (weaponry)
- List of rifle cartridges
- List of rimmed cartridges
- 10 mm caliber
