= .450 Black Powder Express =

Rifle cartridge

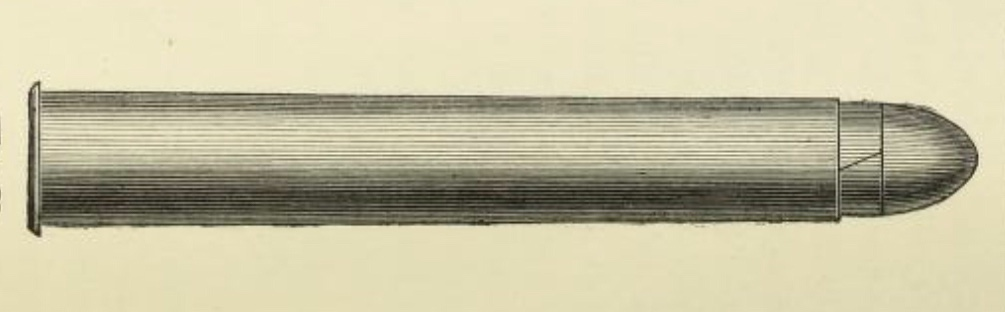
- Type: Rifle
- Place of origin: United Kingdom

Production history
- Designed: 1870s

Specifications
- Case type: Rimmed, straight
- Bullet diameter: .458 in (11.6 mm)
- Neck diameter: .479 in (12.2 mm)
- Base diameter: .545 in (13.8 mm)
- Rim diameter: .624 in (15.8 mm)
- Rim thickness: .040 in (1.0 mm)
- Case length: 3.25 in (83 mm)
- Overall length: 4.11 in (104 mm)
- Case capacity: 136.3 gr H_{2}O (8.83 cm^{3})
- Primer type: Kynoch # 40

Ballistic performance
| Bullet mass/type | Velocity | Energy |
|---|---|---|
| 270 gr (17 g) Lead copper-tubed | 1,975 ft/s (602 m/s) | 2,340 ft⋅lbf (3,170 J) |
| 310 gr (20 g) Lead solid | 1,800 ft/s (550 m/s) | 2,240 ft⋅lbf (3,040 J) |
| 325 gr (21 g) Lead copper-tubed | 1,775 ft/s (541 m/s) | 2,280 ft⋅lbf (3,090 J) |
| 350 gr (23 g) | 2,150 ft/s (660 m/s) | 2,340 ft⋅lbf (3,170 J) |
| 365 gr (24 g) Lead solid | 1,700 ft/s (520 m/s) | 2,340 ft⋅lbf (3,170 J) |
- Sources: Barnes, Kynoch and Taylor.

The .450 Black Powder Express, also known as the .450 3 1/4-inch BPE, was a popular black powder cartridge in the late 19th and early 20th century.

== Design ==
The .450 Black Powder Express is a rimmed, straight walled, centerfire rifle cartridge designed for use with blackpowder. It was available in a number of loadings with bullets weighing from 270 to 365 grains (17.5 to 23.7 g), all driven by 120 grains (7.8 g) of black powder.

The .450 Nitro for Black is the same cartridge with mild loadings of modern smokeless powder, balanced to replicate the ballistics of the black powder version.

== Dimensions ==
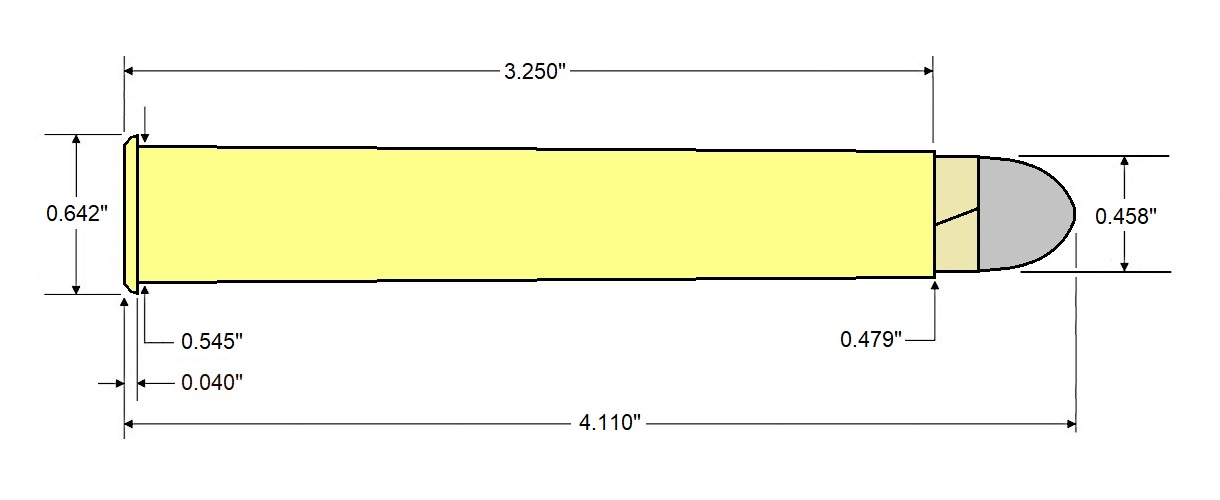
.450 Black Powder Express dimensions

== History ==
In 19th century Britain there were a large number of straight .450 cartridges developed of varying case lengths up to the 3 1/4-inch version. The .450 3 1/4-inch Black Powder Express was originally developed by Alexander Henry as an experimental military cartridge for the 1869 British Army rifle trials that led to adoption of the Martini–Henry rifle. The original military trial "long chamber" cartridge was loaded with a bullet weighing 480 grains (31 g), although for military use it was found to be awkwardly long and difficult to handle and to load, in response Eley Brothers developed the much shorter, bottlenecked .577/450 Martini–Henry cartridge.

In the 1870s the .450 3 1/4-inch "long chamber" cartridge became the basis for the .450 Black Powder Express when loaded with lighter projectiles fired at higher velocities than the original. The .450 Black Powder Express was the most popular sporting Express cartridge and was manufactured in the UK, France, Germany, Austria and Canada and was readily available in both black powder and Nitro for Black versions well into the 20th century.

=== Parent case ===
Around 1880 this cartridge was necked down to .405 inch to make the .450/400 Black Powder Express which in turn, when loaded with cordite, became the .450/400 Nitro Express which was further developed into the .400 Jeffery Nitro Express.

=== Nitro Express loadings ===
In 1898 John Rigby & Company loaded this cartridge with smokeless cordite to create the .450 Nitro Express, the first Nitro Express cartridge.

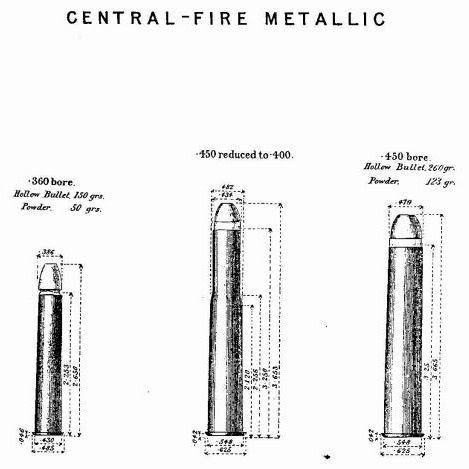
Illustration of the .360, .450/400 & .450 Black Powder Express cartridges.

== Use ==
The .450 3 1/4-inch Black Powder Express was one of the most popular cartridges ever devised, it was widely used to shoot deer and similar sized game, as well as large dangerous game up to and including elephant.

Frederick Selous owned a single barrelled .450 Black Powder Express by Alexander Henry which he used to shoot lion when low on ammunition for his favourite .461 Gibbs No 1 Farquharson rifle.

John "Pondoro" Taylor owned two rifles in .450 Black Powder Express, a single falling block rifle and a double rifle by Holland & Holland, with these rifles he killed elephant, rhinoceros and buffalo shooting 365 grain hardened lead bullets, and lion shooting soft solid lead bullets of the same weight.

The favourite rifle of the great continental sportsman Ernest II, Duke of Saxe-Coburg and Gotha was a .450 Black Powder Express by Alexander Henry, with which he shot running deer out to 440 metres (480 yd).

== See also ==
- Express (weaponry)
- List of rifle cartridges
- 11 mm caliber other cartridges of similar caliber size.
