= .400 Jeffery Nitro Express =

.40 caliber elephant gun cartridge

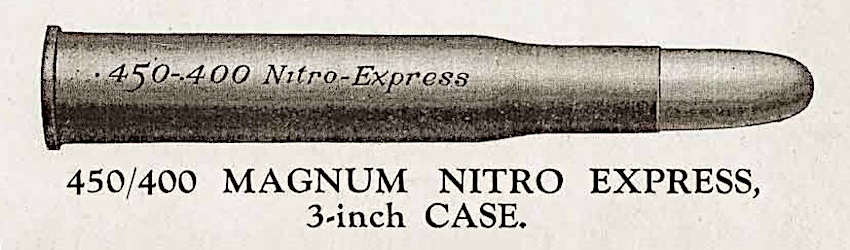
- Illustration from the 1938–1939 Westley Richards brochure
- Type: Rifle
- Place of origin: United Kingdom

Production history
- Designer: W. J. Jeffery & Co.
- Designed: 1896
- Produced: 1896–present

Specifications
- Parent case: .450/400 Black Powder Express
- Case type: Rimmed, bottleneck
- Bullet diameter: .410 in (10.4 mm)
- Neck diameter: .440 in (11.2 mm)
- Shoulder diameter: .520 in (13.2 mm)
- Base diameter: .548 in (13.9 mm)
- Rim diameter: .625 in (15.9 mm)
- Rim thickness: .065 in (1.7 mm)
- Case length: 3.00 in (76 mm)
- Overall length: 3.75 in (95 mm)
- Case capacity: 117.0 gr H_{2}O (7.58 cm^{3})
- Rifling twist: 1-15 in (381 mm)
- Primer type: Boxer
- Maximum pressure: 40,611 psi (280.00 MPa)

Ballistic performance
Bullet mass/type	Velocity	Energy
400 gr (26 g)	2,100 ft/s (640 m/s)	3,920 ft⋅lbf (5,310 J)
- Test barrel length: 26 inches Sources: Kynoch & Barnes.

The .400 Jeffery Nitro Express or .450/400 Nitro Express 3-inch is a medium bore, bottlenecked, Nitro Express cartridge designed by W. J. Jeffery & Co. in 1896, intended for use in single shot and double rifles.

== Development ==
The W. J. Jeffery & Co. developed the .400 Jeffery NE from the .450/400 3-1/4-inch Nitro Express, following extraction problems with the latter cartridge.

The .450/400 3-1/4-inch NE was recreated by loading the old .450/400 3-1/4-inch Black Powder Express with cordite, transforming a low-velocity deerstalking cartridge into a genuine big-game hunting round capable of tackling even the largest Indian and African game. The conversion was not initially entirely successful, under the increased pressures of the cordite loading the long neck could stick in the chamber causing the rim to pull off at extraction, a problem not encountered with the milder black powder loadings. To counter this, W. J. Jeffery & Co. reduced the length of the case to 3-inches and moved the neck further forward, creating this cartridge, as such it was never loaded with black powder.

Unlike earlier .450/400 3-1/4-inch NE cases the .400 Jeffery NE was standardised on the .410 caliber bullets, renewed interest in the double rifles meant more bullets in this caliber were becoming available.

== Dimensions ==
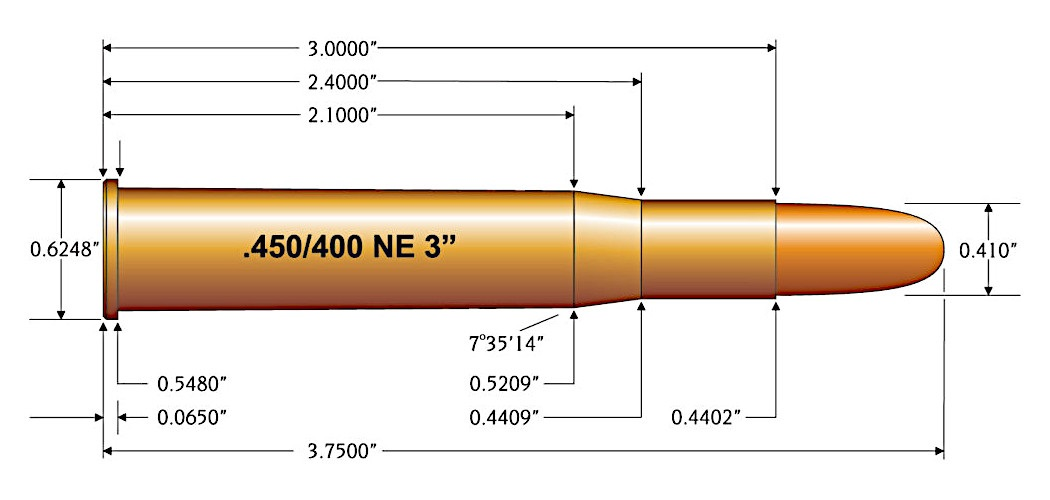

== Use ==
The .450/400 NE in both the 3-inch and 3-1/4-inch versions were extremely popular in Africa and India, prior to the introduction of the .375 Holland & Holland they were considered the best all-round African hunting caliber. Both cartridges were extremely popular in India with Maharajas and British sportsmen.

Karamojo Bell started his elephant hunting career with a Jeffery built .450/400 double rifle prior to moving to his famous .275 Rigby. Jim Corbett switched from a .500 Black Powder Express to a W.J. Jeffery boxlock double rifle in .400 Jeffery NE which he used along with a .275 Rigby.

In his African Rifles and Cartridges, John "Pondoro" Taylor stated the 3-inch and 3-1/4-inch .450/400 NE cartridges to be "the grandest weapons imaginable for all big game hunting" adequate for all African game in almost all conditions when used by an experienced hunter. He further stated "I derived greater pleasure from using the .400 than any other calibre; and no weapon behaved more successfully in my hands. I would happily finish the remainder of my career with a pair of them and nothing else-unless it was a third!"

Major Percy Powell-Cotton wrote the "Jeffery .400 ejector express rifle I first carried in my Abyssinian expedition is my favourite weapon for dangerous game. With all nickel-covered bullets it is excellent for head or heart shots at elephant. With the lead just showing at the nose they do good work on rhino and buffalo; whilst with half the lead exposed I do not think you can get a better weapon for lion."

Elmer Keith stated this cartridge would be his first choice when hunting brown bear in Alaska.

Jim Corbett used this cartridge to hunt man-eating tigers and leopards in India.

== See also ==
- Nitro Express
- List of rifle cartridges
- 10 mm caliber other cartridges of similar caliber size.
