= .600 Overkill =

Rifle cartridge

- Type: Hunting, rifle
- Place of origin: United States

Production history
- Designer: Robert Garnick
- Designed: 2000

Specifications
- Parent case: None
- Case type: Belted, straight
- Bullet diameter: 15.7 mm (0.62 in)
- Neck diameter: 16.4 mm (0.65 in)
- Shoulder diameter: 16.4 mm (0.65 in)
- Base diameter: 16.7 mm (0.66 in)
- Rim diameter: 16.3 mm (0.64 in)
- Rim thickness: 1.5 mm (0.059 in)
- Case length: 76 mm (3.0 in)
- Overall length: 93 mm (3.7 in)
- Case capacity: 196.6 cm^{3} (3,034 gr H_{2}O)
- Primer type: Magnum large rifle

Ballistic performance
Bullet mass/type	Velocity	Energy
900 gr (58 g) FMJ	2,400 ft/s	11,510 ft⋅lbf

The .600 Overkill is a hunting cartridge designed by American Hunting Rifles to fit the CZ-550 action.

== Design ==
The .600 Overkill was designed by Robert Garnick of Las Vegas, Nevada in 2000. The case is a custom, with a belt, .683 in (17.35 mm), added for headspacing and the rim to fit that of the .505 Gibbs .640 in-(16.26 mm) size, bolt face.

This cartridge was intended to fire the largest bullet able to fit in the CZ-550, and was designed specifically for the purpose of killing an elephant. The CZ-550 can fit two cartridges, with slight alterations. The .600 Overkill fires a 900-grain (58 g) bullet at more than 2,400 ft/s (730 m/s),
