= .585 Nyati =

Rifle cartridge

- Type: Rifle

Production history
- Designer: Ross Seyfried

Specifications
- Parent case: .577 Nitro Express
- Bullet diameter: .585 in (14.9 mm)
- Rim diameter: 0.640 in (16.3 mm)
- Case length: 2.800 in (71.1 mm)

Ballistic performance
Bullet mass/type	Velocity	Energy
750 gr (49 g) Solid	2,466 ft/s (752 m/s)	10,130 ft⋅lbf (13,730 J)
- Source(s): Accurate Reloading

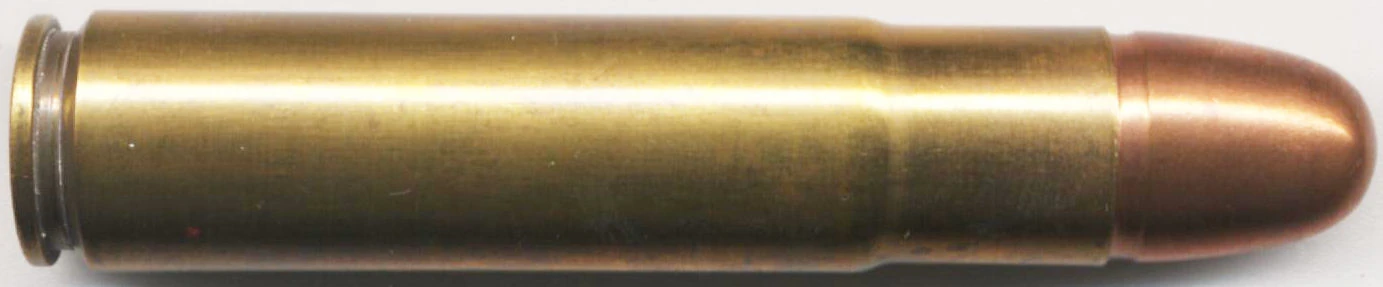
.585 Nyati on its side

The .585 Nyati (14.9×71mmRB) is a shoulder-fired rifle cartridge. Nyati (n-ya-te) means Cape Buffalo in many African languages such as Swahili. The .585 Nyati can generate 10,000 lb⋅ft (13,600 N⋅m) of muzzle energy. This places it at or near the top of the list for most powerful cartridges that can be chambered in a rifle that can still be carried afield.

== History ==
The .585 Nyati was developed by Ross Seyfried. He was motivated by the desire to create a rifle with tremendous stopping power at a fraction of the cost of expensive double guns such as the various Nitro Express rounds.

The rims were turned from .577 Nitro brass and the case blown out straight to allow formation of enough of a shoulder for headspace purposes. Brass formed by this method, during the developmental phase, had a relatively weak case head because the parent .577 Nitro case was designed for a double rifle which supports the case head all the way to the rim. In a bolt-action rifle, a portion of the case head is unsupported and requires more strength in that area.

== See also ==
- .577 Tyrannosaur
- List of rebated rim cartridges
- 13 mm caliber
