= .500 Black Powder Express =

Rifle cartridge

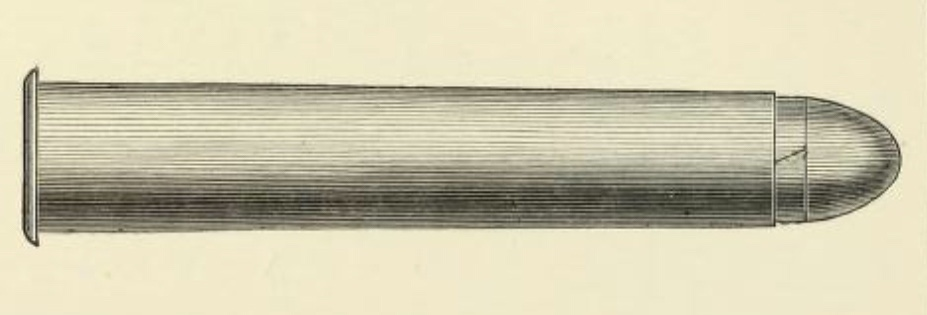
- Type: Rifle
- Place of origin: United Kingdom

Production history
- Designed: 1860s

Specifications
- Case type: Rimmed, straight
- Bullet diameter: .510 in (13.0 mm)
- Neck diameter: .535 in (13.6 mm)
- Base diameter: .580 in (14.7 mm)
- Rim diameter: .660 in (16.8 mm)
- Rim thickness: .055 in (1.4 mm)
- Case length: 3.01 in (76 mm)
- Overall length: 3.39 in (86 mm)
- Primer type: Kynoch # 31A

Ballistic performance
Bullet mass/type	Velocity	Energy
440 gr (29 g)	1,900 ft/s (580 m/s)	3,530 ft⋅lbf (4,790 J)
- Test barrel length: 28; Source(s): Barnes & Amber and Kynoch

The .500 Black Powder Express was a series of Black powder cases of varying lengths that emerged in the 1860s.

== Development ==
The cartridge was offered in several case lengths including 1 1/2-inch, 2-inch, 2 1/4-inch, 2 5/8-inch, 3-inch and 3 1/4-inch, several were successful and endured others lasted only a short period.

The 3-inch and 3 1/4-inch .500 BPE cartridges have survived to the current day as the .500 3-inch Nitro for Black and the .500 3 1/4-inch Nitro for Black, the same cartridges loaded with mild loadings of modern smokeless powder, carefully balanced through trial to replicate the ballistics of the Black powder version. The two cartridges offer almost identical ballistic performance to each other, and are very similar to the .50-140 Sharps.

=== Nitro Express loadings ===
The 3-inch and 3 1/4-inch cartridges were later loaded with smokeless cordite to create the .500 Nitro Express, with the 3-inch version becoming the most popular.

=== Parent case ===
In the 1870s the 3 1/4-inch cartridge was necked down to .45-inches to create the .500/450 Magnum Black Powder Express which in turn, when loaded with cordite, became the .500/450 Nitro Express. After the British government's 1907 ban of .450 caliber ammunition to India and Sudan, the .500/465 Nitro Express and the .470 Nitro Express were formed from this cartridge.

== Dimensions ==
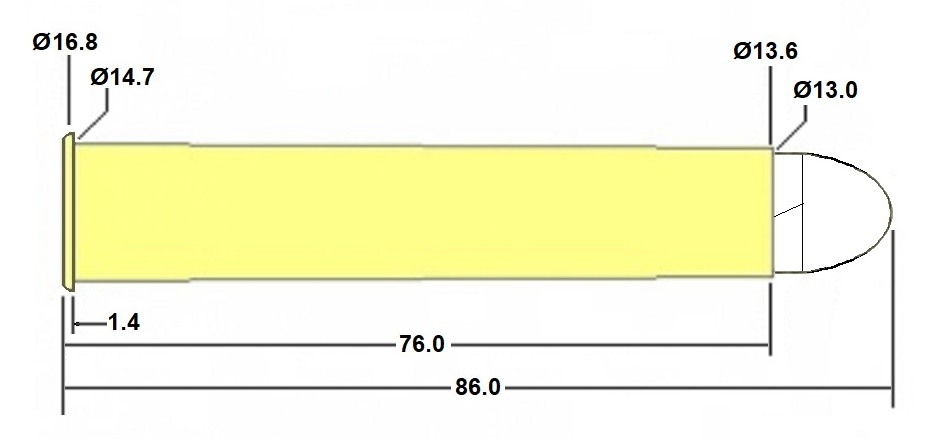

== Use ==
The .500 BPE was considered a good cartridge for medium-sized non dangerous game and can still be used for such.

The .500 BPE was never highly regarded for hunting in Africa, yet it was a popular cartridge in India, considered a good general purpose rifle cartridge popular for hunting tigers. Jim Corbett was a user of a .500 BPE rifle prior to switching to a .400 Jeffery Nitro Express double rifle, shooting cordite Nitro for Black loadings this rifle was used to dispatch the first man-eater he shot, the Champawat Tiger.

== See also ==
- Express (weaponry)
- List of rifle cartridges
- List of rimmed cartridges
- 13 mm caliber
