= Alexander Henry (gun maker) =

Scottish gunsmith (1818–1894)

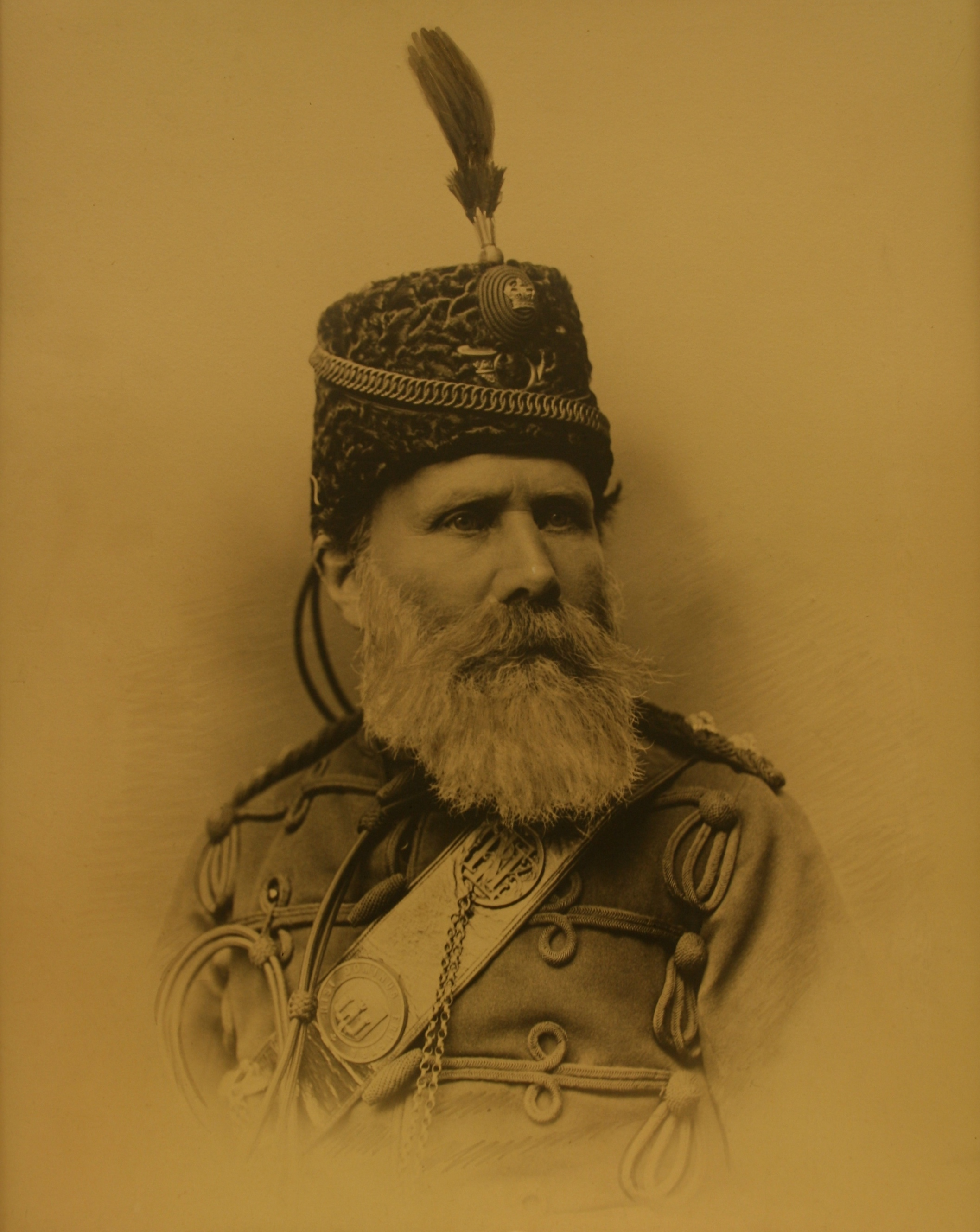
- Photo held by The City of Edinburgh Council Museums & Galleries. Inscription reads: "The First Scottish Volunteer March 1859"
- Born: 4 June 1818; Leith
- Died: 27 January 1894 (aged 75); Edinburgh
- Resting place: Warriston Cemetery, Edinburgh
- Occupation: Gunsmith
- Known for: Martini–Henry rifle

Signature
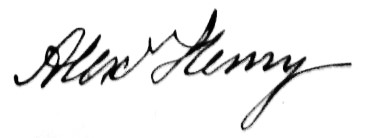

Alexander Henry (1818–1894) was a Scottish gun maker, based in Edinburgh, and designer of the Henry rifling and barrel used in the Martini–Henry rifle.

He submitted a rifle to the competition organised by the British government for a replacement for their existing Snider–Enfield service weapon. His breech action and barrel were both judged to be the best (and won the prizes). The War Office did not adopt its action, preferring that of Friedrich von Martini, but did adopt its seven-grooved barrel rifling scheme. The resulting Martini-Henry rifle is named after von Martini and himself.

During his life Henry was the "First Volunteer", the first signatory to the creation of the Queen’s Edinburgh Rifle Volunteers, Moderator of the High Constables of Edinburgh, a Justice of the Peace, a Freemason (initiated in Lodge St Clair No 349) and an Edinburgh town councillor.

He was admitted to The Royal Scottish Society Of Arts in March 1856.

In 1872 he was appointed "gun and rifle manufacturer to His Royal Highness the Prince of Wales".

In 1873, one of his double rifles was specially made by Henry for Queen Victoria in 1873 and presented it to her personal servant John Brown for Christmas that year. The "extremely rare" Royal .450 double-barrelled hammer rifle was on public display for the first time from June to November 2019 in the National Museum of Scotland's Wild and Majestic: Romantic Visions of Scotland exhibition.

He and his wife Isabella had nine children : Eliza Mackay Henry, Jemima Janet Henry, James Alexander Henry (accidentally shot and killed by his father in 1860, aged 12), William Orchardson Henry (died aged 2, possibly named after portrait painter William Quiller Orchardson), Isabella Henry, a stillborn child, Alexander (Alick) Henry, Alice Mills Henry (died aged 1) and John Chave Luxmoore Henry. When Alexander Henry died, he left the business to Alick and John, but they sold it within a couple of months, beginning the slow decline of the "brand".

The first comprehensive biography of Alexander Henry, Alexander Henry, Rifle Maker, was published on 23 November 2017. It was written by gunmaking history author Donald Dallas, with considerable input from Henry's great great grandson, Richard Brown.

His grave is in Warriston Cemetery, Edinburgh.
