= .577 Black Powder Express =

Rifle cartridge

.577 Black Powder Express (3-inch)
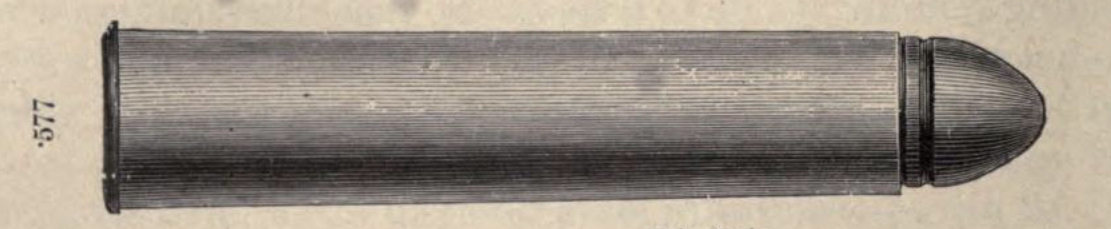
- Type: Rifle
- Place of origin: United Kingdom

Production history
- Designed: 1870s

Specifications
- Case type: Rimmed, straight
- Bullet diameter: .584 in (14.8 mm)
- Neck diameter: .608 in (15.4 mm)
- Base diameter: .660 in (16.8 mm)
- Rim diameter: .728 in (18.5 mm)
- Rim thickness: .052 in (1.3 mm)
- Case length: 3 in (76 mm)
- Primer type: Kynoch # 40

Ballistic performance
Bullet mass/type	Velocity	Energy
570 gr (37 g) Lead copper tubed	1,725 ft/s (526 m/s)	3,770 ft⋅lbf (5,110 J)
610 gr (40 g) Lead solid	1,650 ft/s (500 m/s)	3,690 ft⋅lbf (5,000 J)
- Test barrel length: 28; Sources: Barnes, Kynoch and Taylor.

.577 Black Powder Express (2 3/4-inch)

Ballistic performance
Bullet mass/type	Velocity	Energy
520 gr (34 g) Lead copper tubed	1,725 ft/s (526 m/s)	3,440 ft⋅lbf (4,660 J)
560 gr (36 g) Lead solid	1,650 ft/s (500 m/s)	3,380 ft⋅lbf (4,580 J)

The .577 Black Powder Express is a series of black powder cartridges of varying lengths including 2 1/2-inch, 2 3/4-inch, 3-inch and 3 1/4-inch.

== Development ==
The .577 BPE originated around 1870 with the 2 1/2-inch variant.

The 3-inch cartridge has survived to the current day as the .577 Nitro for Black, the same cartridge loaded with mild loadings of modern smokeless powder, carefully balanced through trial to replicate the ballistics of the Black powder version.

The 2 3/4-inch, 3-inch and 3 1/4-inch cartridges were later loaded with smokeless cordite to create the .577 Nitro Express, with the 3-inch version becoming the most popular.

== Use ==
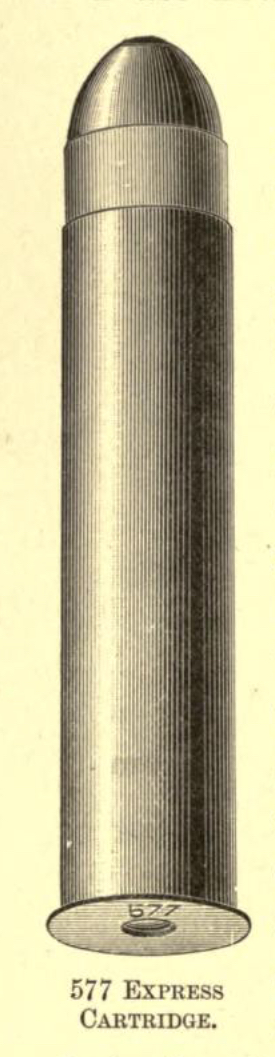

These cartridges were used for the heavier species of soft skinned game, including dangerous ones such lions, tigers and wild boar. Its also useful under all but the most adverse condition against thick skinned quarries such as the gaur, cape buffalo and even elephants.

In his African Rifles and Cartridges, John "Pondoro" Taylor describes the .577 Black Powder Express as the most popular cartridge for shooting tiger in India and that many of the greatest lion hunters in Africa preferred it to anything else. He further states "If I was concentrating on tiger or man-eating lion to the exclusion of anything else, I shouldn't hesitate: I would almost certainly have a double .577 [Black Powder Express] built....".

=== Prominent users ===
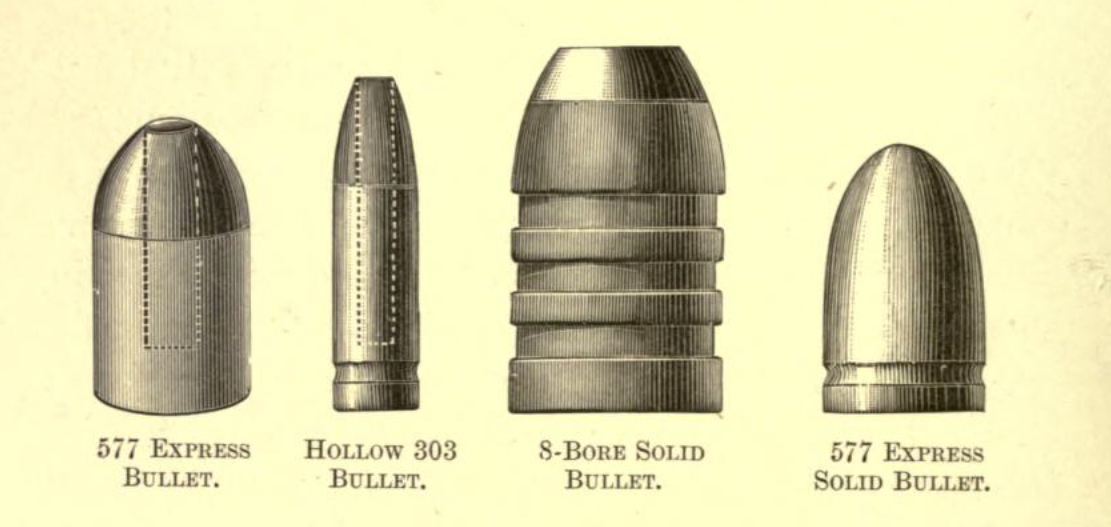
Comparison of a .577 Express solid and hollow bullets with a .303 British and 8 bore bullet.

Sir Samuel Baker's favourite rifle at the end of his hunting life was a .577 Black Powder Express built by Holland and Holland, with which he hunted various game all over the world. He mentioned that it was ideal for any animal bigger than the fallow deer and smaller than the cape buffalo, "as the .577 is the most fatal weapon I ever used, and with 6 or 6 1/2 drams of powder it is quite equal to any animals in creation, provided the shot is behind the shoulder".

Arthur Henry Neumann preferred the .577 Black Powder Express to all other calibres for hunting elephant until the introduction of the .450 Nitro Express.

The specialist lion hunter Yank Allen shot most of his lions with a .577 Black Powder Express double rifle.

Harald G.C. Swayne used a Holland & Holland .577 Black Powder Express double rifle extensively for hunting in Africa and India.

== See also ==
- .577 (disambiguation)
- Express cartridges
- 20/577 Alexander Henry
- List of rifle cartridges
- 13 mm caliber
