= .577 Tyrannosaur =

American rimless rifle cartridge

577 Tyrannosaur
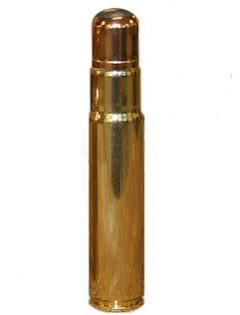
- 577 Tyrannosaur
- Type: Rifle
- Place of origin: United States

Production history
- Designed: 1993

Specifications
- Case type: Rimless, bottleneck
- Bullet diameter: 0.585 in (14.9 mm)
- Neck diameter: 0.6135 in (15.58 mm)
- Shoulder diameter: 0.673 in (17.1 mm)
- Base diameter: 0.689 in (17.5 mm)
- Rim diameter: 0.688 in (17.5 mm)
- Rim thickness: 0.063 in (1.6 mm)
- Case length: 2.990 in (75.9 mm)
- Overall length: 3.710 in (94.2 mm)
- Rifling twist: 1 in 12 in (305 mm)
- Primer type: Large rifle magnum
- Maximum pressure: 65,000 psi (450 MPa)

Ballistic performance
Bullet mass/type	Velocity	Energy
750 gr (49 g) Monolithic solid	2,480 ft/s (760 m/s)	10,240 ft⋅lbf (13,880 J)
- Test barrel length: 26 in Source: Alphin (1996)

The .577 Tyrannosaur or .577 T-Rex (14.9×76mm) is a very large and powerful rifle cartridge developed by A-Square in 1993 on request for professional guides in Zimbabwe who escort clients hunting dangerous game. The cartridge is designed for use in "stopping rifles" intended to stop the charge of dangerous game. The cartridge contains a .585-inch (14.9 mm) diameter 750-grain (49 g) monolithic solid projectile which when fired moves at 2,460 ft/s (750 m/s) producing 10,180 foot-pounds force (13,800 J) of muzzle energy. The production model from A-square was based on their Hannibal rifle. A-Square is defunct as of 2012.
