= Ross rifle =

Canadian bolt-action rifle

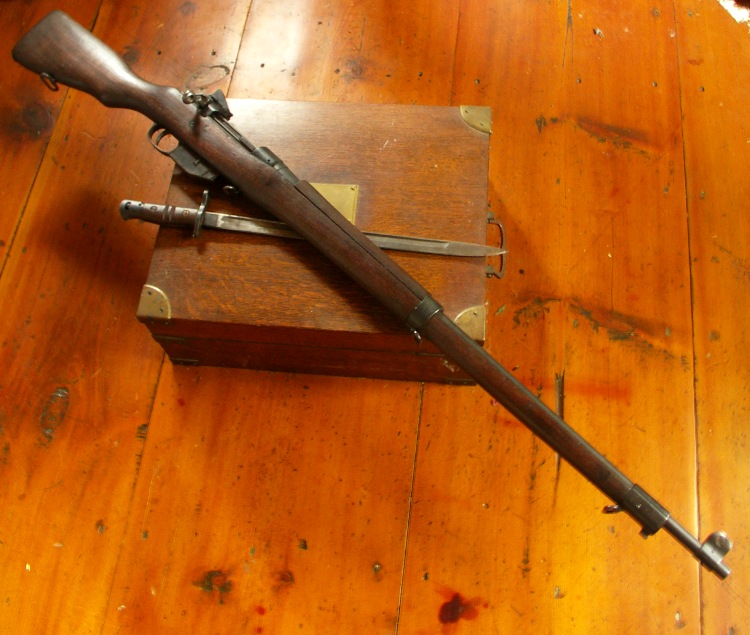
- Type: Bolt action rifle
- Place of origin: Canada

Service history
- In service: 1905–1918; 1939–1945
- Used by: See Users
- Wars: World War I; Irish War of Independence; Spanish Civil War; World War II; 1947–1949 Palestine war

Production history
- Designer: Charles Ross
- Designed: 1903
- Produced: 1903–1918
- No. built: 420,000
- Variants: Mark I (1903); Mark II (1905); Mark II .280 (1907); Mark III (1910); Mark IIIB (1914); Huot Automatic Rifle (1916)

Specifications
- Mass: 3.9 kg (8.6 lb)
- Length: 1,320 mm (52 in)
- Barrel length: 711 mm (28.0 in) (Mk 1 and Mk IIs); 774 mm (30.5 in) Mk II** and Mk III)
- Cartridge: .303 British (7.7×56mmR)
- Caliber: .303 in (7.70 mm)
- Action: Straight-pull bolt action
- Rate of fire: User dependent
- Feed system: 5-round stripper clip/charger

The Ross rifle is a straight-pull bolt action rifle chambered in .303 British that was produced in Canada from 1903 until 1918.

The Ross Mk.II (or "model 1905") rifle was highly successful in target shooting before World War I, but the close chamber tolerances, lack of primary extraction and length made the Mk.III (or "1910") Ross rifle unsuitable for the conditions of trench warfare, exacerbated by the often poor quality ammunition issued.

The Ross Rifle Co. made sporting rifles from early in its production, most notably chambered in .280 Ross, introduced in 1907. This cartridge is recorded as the first to achieve over 3,000 ft/s (914 m/s) muzzle velocity and the cartridge acquired a very considerable international reputation among target shooters and hunters.

== History ==
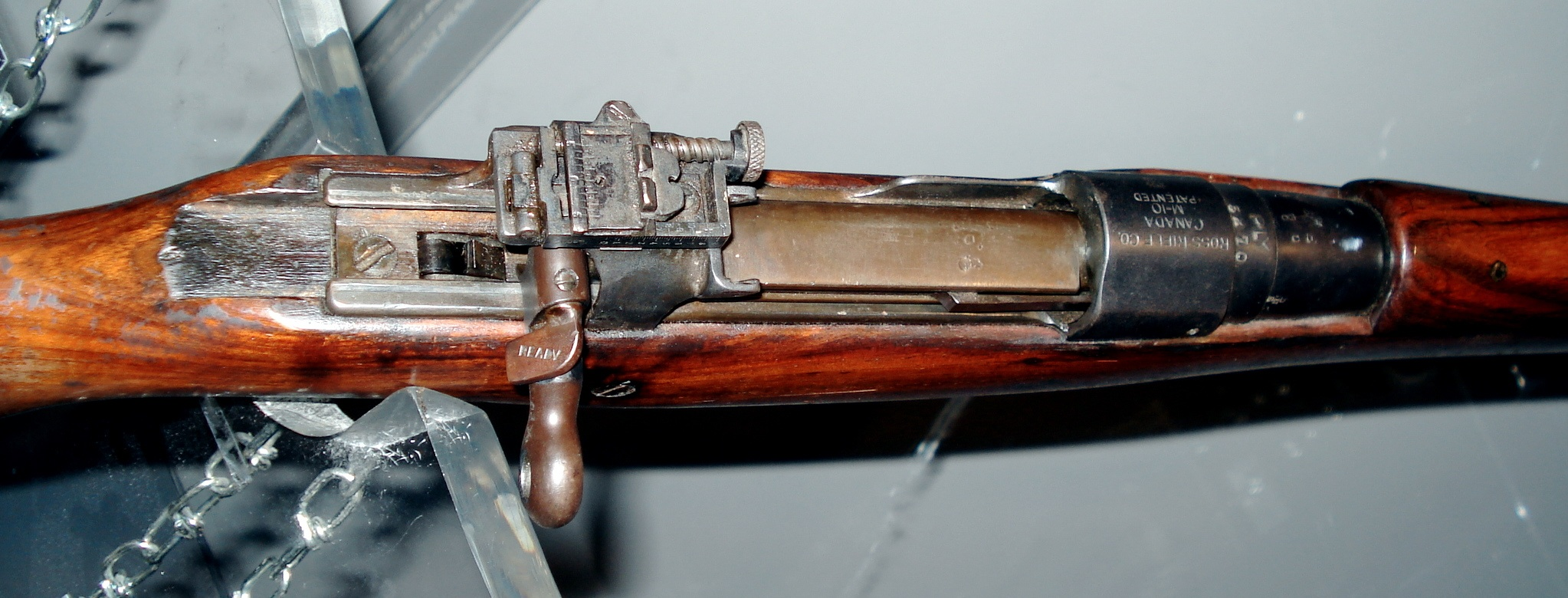
Ross rifle in the Royal Canadian Regiment Museum in London, Ontario

During the Second Boer War (1899–1902), a minor diplomatic fight broke out between Canada and the United Kingdom, after the latter refused to license the Lee–Enfield SMLE design for production in Canada. Sir Charles Ross offered to finance the construction of a factory in Canada to produce his newly designed straight-pull rifle for Canadian service. This offer was accepted by the Liberal government of Sir Wilfrid Laurier and Ross was awarded his first contract in 1903 for 12,000 Mark I Ross rifles.

It is generally accepted that Ross' design was inspired by the straight-pull Austrian Mannlicher M1895 rifle introduced into Austro-Hungarian service in the 1890s and used throughout World War I, and as secondary weapons into World War II. Ross' earliest rifles unmistakably borrowed a number of mechanical details directly from the Mannlicher which was a relatively new design at the time Ross was producing his first rifles in the late 1890s.

The operating principle of the straight-pull bolt action comprises a bolt "sleeve" to which the bolt lever or handle is attached. The sleeve is hollow and has spiral grooves or "teeth" cut into its inner surface in which slide corresponding projections or "teeth" on the outside of the bolt head or "body". As the bolt lever and sleeve are moved, the bolt head is forced to rotate through about 90°, locking or unlocking it in the receiver of the rifle. The bolt handle and sleeve thus need only be pushed backwards or forwards to open or close the action of the rifle.

In conventional bolt-action rifles such as the Mauser, Mosin–Nagant or Lee–Enfield, the bolt is unlocked or locked by the raising or lowering of the bolt handle, before the bolt is drawn back and after it is pushed forward. The single motion required to open or close the bolt of a straight-pull-action rifle is theoretically faster and easier for soldiers to learn, thus perhaps offering a higher rate of fire. Unlike the Lee–Enfield, the bolt of the Ross rifle could be taken apart without special tools, although this was not necessarily an advantage as it encouraged unauthorized disassembly by soldiers.

== Service ==
The first 1,000 rifles were given to the Royal North-West Mounted Police (RNWMP) for testing. Routine inspection before operational testing found 113 defects bad enough to warrant rejection. One of these was a poorly designed bolt lock that enabled the bolt to fall right out of the rifle. Another was poorly tempered component springs that were described as being as "soft as copper". In 1906, the RNWMP reverted to their Model 1894 Winchesters and Lee–Metfords. The Ross rifle was modified to correct these faults and became the Mark II Ross [Model 05 (1905)]. In 1907, the Mk II was modified to handle the higher pressure of new .280 Ross, this variant was called Mk II**. The Model 10 (1910) was a new design, to correct the shortcomings of the 1905. None of the major parts are interchangeable between the 1905 and the 1910 models. Although the British were now encouraging standardization in the Empire on the Lee–Enfield, Canada stayed with the Ross. The Model 10 was the standard infantry weapon of the First Canadian Contingent of the Canadian Expeditionary Force when it first arrived in France in February 1915.

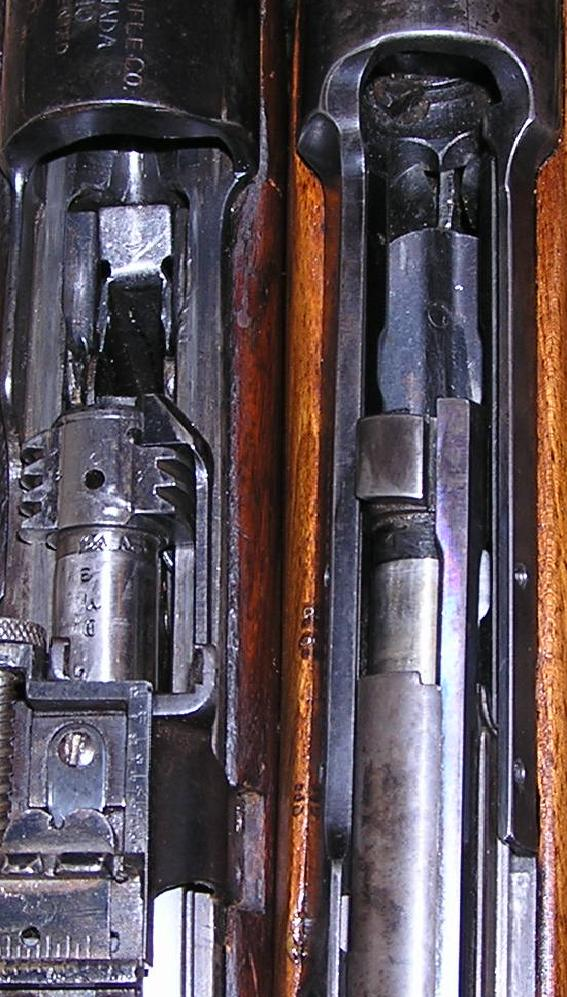
Mechanism comparison between Ross Mk III (1910) and Mk II** (1907)

The shortcomings of the rifle were made apparent before the Second Battle of Ypres in April 1915. Princess Patricia's Canadian Light Infantry was the first unit to voice its objections about the rifle; the regiment replaced the Ross rifle with the more familiar and rugged Lee-Enfield and later persuaded the 3rd Division to switch to the Lee-Enfield. The rifle had problems when British-made ammunition was used, which was produced with lower tolerances than Canadian-made ammunition. Another part of the jamming problem came from the bolt's outer face hitting the bolt stop, then deforming the thread shape. The bolt could also be taken apart for cleaning and inadvertently reassembled in a manner that would fail to lock but still allow a round to be fired, leading to serious injury or death of the operator as the bolt flew back into his face. Armourers in France added a simple rivet or screw in the bolt sleeve to prevent misalignment, but this improvement came too late to prevent the replacement of the Ross with the SMLE.

Another deficiency was the tendency for the bayonet to become dislodged and fall off when firing the rifle. Many Canadians of the First Contingent (now renamed the 1st Canadian Division) at Ypres took Lee–Enfield rifles from fallen British soldiers to replace their Ross rifles. Lieutenant Chris Scriven of the 10th Battalion, CEF, commented that it sometimes took five men just to keep one rifle firing. Major T.V. Scudamore of the British Columbia Regiment, having been captured at Ypres after being wounded, wrote of the "contemptible" Ross rifle, "Those in the front line with that rifle will never forget... what it is like to be charged by the flower of the German army... and be unable to fire a shot in return".

Complaints rapidly reached the rifle's chief sponsor, the Canadian Minister of Militia and Defence Sam Hughes. He continued to believe in its strengths despite the professional opinion of Sir Edwin Alderson, the British Army officer who was commander of the First Canadian Division. The rifle became an element in political issues within Canada and between Canada and the British. Hughes responded to Alderson's criticism by accusing Alderson of ignorance and copied the letter to many officers in the corps. The effect was to undermine confidence in Alderson and the rifle. Hughes also made accusations that Canadian officers were induced to produce adverse reports on the rifle. After negative reports regarding the rifle were published through the Ottawa Citizen, it became increasingly clear that his claims before the House of Commons that all the faults of the rifle had been cured were patently false and Hughes' defence of the rifle could no longer be supported by the Prime Minister. The Ross was more accurate at long range than the SMLE, and this potentially overcame the serious problem British and Canadian troops had faced during the Boer War, with the accurate long-range fire from the 7×57mm Mauser chambered Mauser Model 1895 rifle. In all, approximately 420,000 Ross service rifles were produced, 342,040 of which were purchased by the British. After being replaced by the SMLE, some rifles were scrapped or shipped to Russia, others were given to the Royal Navy and a few Ross rifles were kept as sniper rifles, a role where it excelled, provided it was kept clean and well-maintained.

== Replacement ==
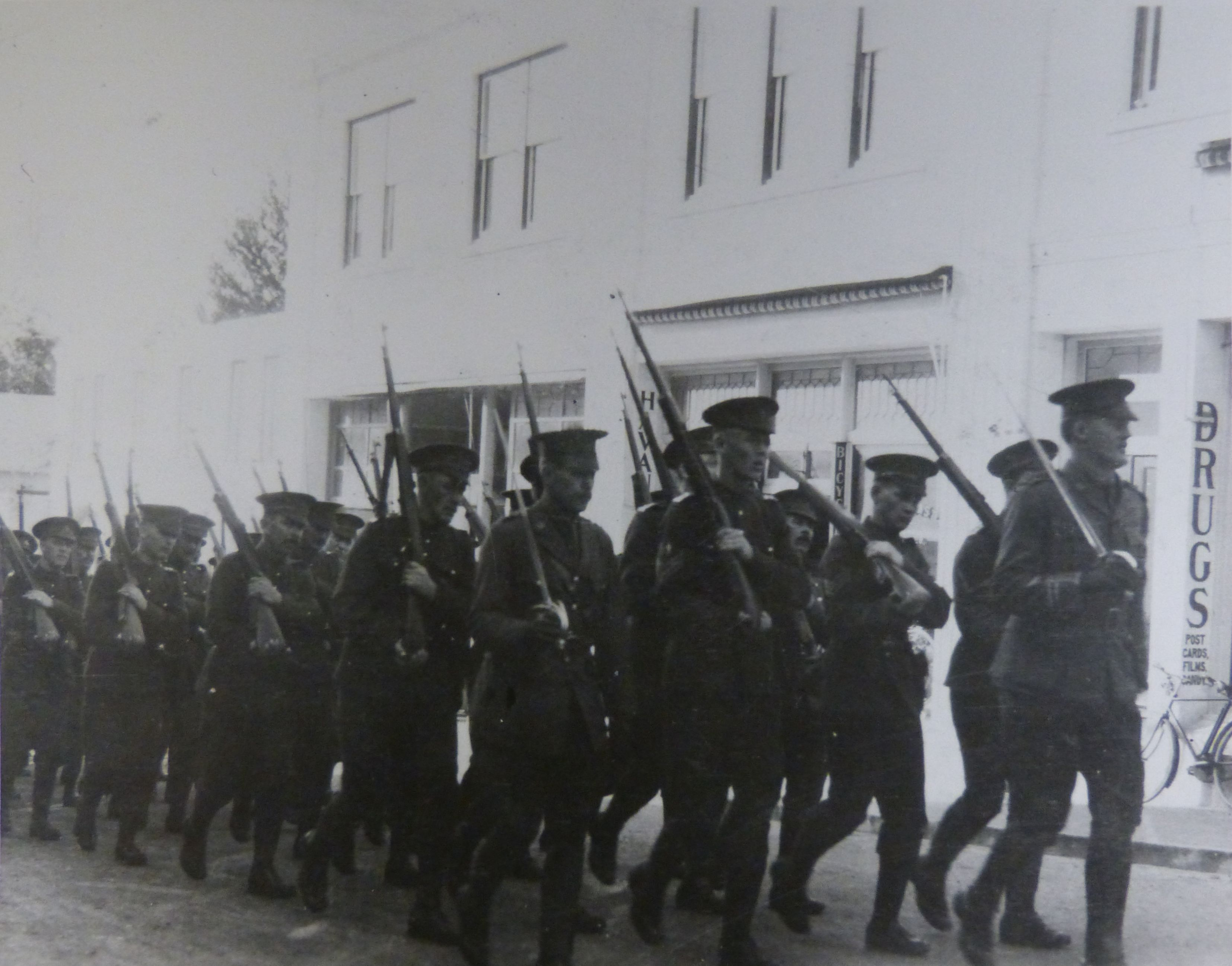
38th Battalion CEF armed with the Ross on Queen Street, City of Hamilton, Bermuda in 1915

Canadians retained the Ross even as additional contingents arrived in France. On 12 June 1915, the 1st Canadian Division replaced all its Ross rifles with Enfields. By the time of the Somme battles of July 1916, Sir Douglas Haig, the new Commander-in-Chief of the British Expeditionary Force, had ordered the replacement of all Ross rifles in the three Canadian Divisions by the Pattern 1914 Enfield, which was finally available in quantity. Hughes refused to accept that there were problems with the Ross, and it took the intervention of many influential people to persuade him otherwise. In November 1916, Hughes resigned after Sir Robert Borden's decision to appoint a Minister of Overseas Forces. Ross rifles were then used for training, in Canada and the UK, to release Lee–Enfields for the front. After the United States entered the war in 1917, Ross rifles were shipped to the U.S. for the same reasons, for more M1903 Springfield rifles at the front. Hughes' reputation was inevitably tarnished, but Sir Charles Ross had already made a considerable fortune from his rifle design and manufacturing contracts despite its reputation. At around the same time, the Dominion Rifle Factory (Quebec City) converted a number of Rosses into the Huot automatic rifle, under the guidance of designer Joseph Alphonse Huot. It was an effective design, feeding from a drum magazine, and cheaper than a Lewis Gun. Despite successful trials, it was never adopted for service.

== Military variants ==
Rifle, Ross Mk I

This was the first production military model Ross Rifle. The first few hundred were fitted with the full-length folding Sight, Ross Mk I. Before any were delivered, the sight was replaced with a shorter version graduated to 2,200 yards rather than 2,500 yards. Years later, this sight would be designated Sight, Ross Mk I*. Many weapons would have this replaced with the Sight, Ross Mk II, a curved sliding "Lange Vizier" type. The barrel was 28 inch long, and the fore-stock ended 4 inches short of the muzzle. The front band had a bayonet lug. The safety was a sliding flat plate on the back of the bolt handle operated by pushing a square button on the plate. The magazine cut-off was on the lower right of the magazine protruding through the stock, and pressing it down engaged the cut-off. The magazine cut-off release was inside the front of the trigger guard, and depressing it would disengage the cut-off. A large lever was on the right side which was used to depress the magazine follower for "dump loading" all five rounds at once. The weapon was a straight-pull cock-on-close design. There was a sliding trap in the butt-stock for cleaning tools. A total of 10,500 were manufactured. A number of the original 500 were re-purposed as training rifles and fitted with longer front barrel bands as used on later production Rifle, Ross Mk II. This was done so they could more easily endure the stress of constant bayonet practice.

Carbine, Ross Mk I

The RNWMP purchased 1,000 shorter versions of the Ross Mk I. The main difference was the barrel length of 26 inches. The full stock of the rifle was retained, and the barrel projected only 2 inches past the forestock. As presented for inspection, the carbines used the shorter version of the Sight, Ross Mk I. However, at the inspector's request, the weapons were delivered fitted with the Sight, Ross Mk II.

Rifle, Ross Mk II

This designation was a 1909 re-designation of those Mk I rifles that had been fitted with the Sight, Ross Mk II.

Rifle, Ross Mk II/Rifle, Ross Mk II with Sight, Ross Mk II

After various complaints had been received, the weapon was re-designed to address the issues. The 28 inch barrel length was retained, and the Sight, Ross Mk II was used. The most noticeable change was the replacement of the side-mounted magazine cut-off control and trigger-guard mounted cut-off release with a single hook shaped control inside the front trigger guard that performed both functions. The action was also changed to cock-on-open. The safety was similar to the earlier model's, but the slider was more solid and inside the bolt handle, moved by pushing a round button on the back of the bolt handle. Changes were introduced in production without change in designation until the introduction of the Sight, Ross Mk III when the nomenclature of the earlier rifles was expanded to Rifle, Ross Mk II with Sight, Ross Mk II.

Rifle, Ross Mk II with Sight, Ross Mk III

The "Sight, Ross Mk II" proved more fragile than desired, and it was replaced with a simpler version, the "Sight, Ross Mk III". Instead of a curved bend to the slider, they employed a straight slider with curve-cut sides bent down. The official nomenclature for this model was "Rifle, Ross Mk II with Sight, Ross Mk III". The 28 inch barrel was retained, the sight change being the difference. Further improvements would be introduced to production without changing the designation.

Rifle, Ross Mk II*

In early 1909 it was decided to adapt the Rifle Ross Mk II with Sight, Ross Mk II for cadet use, doing full maintenance and upgrading components to later production changes. The Sight, Ross Mk II was retained, however. 5,800 weapons were so converted from late 1909 to mid 1910. The weapons were designated Rifle, Ross Mk II*. This designation identified specific conversions of older weapons and did not reflect any changes to new production.

Rifle, Ross Mk II**

Development of this weapon began in the spring of 1908, and the planned designation was Rifle, Ross Mk III. This model was intended as a major improvement over the previous Rifle, Ross Mark II with Sight, Ross Mk III. The barrel length was extended to 30.5 inches, the rear hand-guard was simplified, the safety was replaced by a completely new flag-type safety, and the rear sight was changed to the third-party Sight, Sutherland Mk I. The magazine cut-off was dispensed with entirely. By the time it was ready to be produced in numbers, an even more radical design change was in the works to become the Mk III, and this model was designated Rifle, Ross Mk II** instead. In May 1909, it was decided to convert some 500 of the Rifle, Ross Mk II, with Sight, Ross Mk III to the new design for field trials. This was increased to 700. While these weapons were being trialed, production of the shorter "Mk II" continued, with some of the "Mk II**" changes being introduced. In 1911, the Rifle, Ross Mk II** became the standard Canadian issue, and production began. Some 13,000 were newly manufactured before this model was superseded by the Rifle, Ross Mk III in 1912.

Rifle, Ross Mk II^{3}*

This rifle was an adaptation of the Rifle, Ross Mk II to use the Sight, Sutherland Mk II. Some internal improvements were made as well. The original sliding button safety and the magazine cut-off were retained, along with the 28 inch barrel and the stylish older rear hand-guard. None of this model were newly manufactured. All were converted from Rifle, Ross Mk II with Sight, Ross Mk III or the later Rifle, Ross Mk II^{4}*. Some 26,000 were converted from 1910 to 1912. 20,000 were sold to the United States in Nov, 1917. In 1911, the shorter variants were replaced by the longer Rifle, Ross Mk II** as standard Canadian issue.

Rifle, Ross Mk II^{4}*

This rifle was a simple upgrade of the last 4,000 manufactured Rifle, Ross Mk II with Sight, Ross Mk III to include the new larger extractor introduced with the Mk II**. The 28 inch barrel, stylish rear hand-guard, sliding button safety, and magazine cut-off were retained. They were completed in the early summer of 1910, then all 4,000 were immediately converted into the Rifle, Ross Mk II^{3}*.

Rifle, Ross Mk II^{5}*

The last of the shorter (28 inch barrel) Mk II line would be produced using the "Sight, Sutherland Mk I" and simplified rear hand-guard of the Mk II**. The 28 inch barrel, sliding button safety, and magazine cut-off were retained. Starting in 1910, some 15,000 were manufactured. In 1911, the shorter variants were replaced by the longer Mk II** as standard Canadian issue.

Rifle, Ross Mk III

For all practical purposes, the Mk III was an entirely new design. It incorporated the 30.5 inch barrel and flag safety of the Mk II**, taking that re-design much further. The internal double-stack magazine was replaced with an exposed single-stack magazine. The "dump loading" lever was gone, and a charger guide was added for loading with stripper clips. A magazine cut-off was employed, but the design that lowered the magazine shell was discarded and replaced by one that restricted the rearward travel of the bolt. The bolt-stop plunger was replaced by a flag lever with three positions (cut-off enabled, bolt release, cut-off disabled). The bolt was far sturdier and had multi-thread locking lugs. A new rear sight designated the "Ross Battle Aperture" was installed on the bridge of the receiver rather than on top of the barrel. World War I increased demand, and at least 235,540 were produced for Canadian forces.

Rifle, Ross Mk IIIB

The British government chose to purchase a version of the Mk III with a far simpler rear sight known as the "War Office Pattern Sight". The stock was also strengthened. Some 66,590 were produced.

A "Rifle, Ross Mk III*" may have existed, employing a strengthened action, new front barrel band, and different front sight. The one source mentioning it considers the designation dubious.

== Military name changes ==
In 1907, Rifle, Ross Mk II became Rifle, Ross Mk II with Sight, Ross Mk II and Rifle, Ross Mk II with Sight, Ross Mk III.

In 1912, all military variants were redesignated as follows:

- Rifle, Ross Mk I and Rifle, Ross Mk I* became Rifle, G.P. Ross (G.P. meaning "general purpose").
- Rifle, Ross Mk II with Sight, Ross Mk II and Rifle, Ross Mk II* became Rifle, Cadet, Ross.
- Rifle, Ross Mk II with Sight, Ross Mk III became Rifle, Short, Ross Mk I.
- Rifle, Ross Mk II^{3}* and Rifle, Ross Mk II^{5}* became Rifle, Short, Ross Mk II.
- Rifle, Ross Mk II** became Rifle, Long, Ross Mk II.
- Rifle, Ross Mk III became Rifle, Long, Ross Mk III.

In 1918, Rifle, G.P. Ross, Rifle, Cadet, Ross, Rifle, Short, Ross Mk I, and Rifle, Short, Ross Mk II became Rifle, Ross, .303", Cadet D.P. (D.P. meaning "Drill Purpose").

== Sniper rifles ==
Two types of Mark III sniper rifles are identified by different telescopic sights. Five hundred rifles were fitted with 5.2× Warner & Swasey Company Model 1913 prismatic telescopic sights manufactured in Cleveland, Ohio. Serial numbers for rifles manufactured in 1915 have a FK prefix; while those manufactured in 1917 have a LU prefix. Another 907 rifles were fitted with Winchester Repeating Arms Company A5 telescopic sights. Both telescopic sights were mounted offset so the iron sights were usable and the rifle could still be loaded from charging strips.

== Sporting variant ==
Ross settled a gun factory in Hartford, Connecticut, with machinist J. A. Bennett, to produce a sporting rifle called the Model 1897 Magazine Sporting Rifle, a hinged hammer type rifle. By the same time, he made a commercial agreement with the famous gunmaker firm Charles William Lancaster, inventor of the oval bore, to be his exclusive UK agent.

Early 1900, he brought out the Model 1900 Sporter, still made in Bennett's factory. This action used a coil spring to activate the firing pin, instead of the hinged-hammer of the M1897. Very few of these sporting rifles are known to exist. The militarized Pattern 1900 was also the first to be offered for trial to Canada.

Following was the Model 1903 Sporter; some of these rifles were made in Hartford, Connecticut, but most (200 units, made from spare parts) were assembled at the brand new fabricating plant in Quebec City. Some of the Pattern 1903 Sporting Rifles were made in the .370 Express calibre, while some prototype chambered for .450/.500 Nitro is known to exist. Models .303 Brit. are common, .256 Mannlicher rare, and .370 Express are rare.

Some sporterised M1905 (Mk II) military rifles were made available to general public in 1906. This model was called Model M. In 1907, Ross brought out the Model E, his first entirely Canadian-made rifle, based on the 1905 military action, chambered for .303 British and .35 WCF. Following was Model R, which was a plain looking rifle, no checkering, in .303 British only. In November 1906, Ross while in the process of developing a new and very powerful .280 caliber sporting cartridge, made some experimental tests with a necked-down version of the new .30-06 Springfield case which he called the .28-1906 (one rifle is known to exist). This led to the design of the .280 Ross. The new high-pressure round required some strengthening of the bolt and action receiver, but the rifle was otherwise only slightly different from the .303 Mark II. This design, called MK II**, was a transitional step between Mk II and Mk III actions.

- Model M (1905 Mk II action); .303 Brit
- Model R (1905 Mk II action); .303 Brit.
- Model E (1907 Mk II** action heavy barrel); .303 Brit., 35 WCF
- Model 1907 'Scotch Deer Stalking Pattern'; .280 Ross

The Model 1910 (Mk III) was made with a totally different bolt head; instead of having the solid bolt lugs travel in a vertical position and lock in a horizontal position, like for the Mk II and Mk II** (see illustration), Ross turned it 90 degrees so it travels in a horizontal position and locks vertically. Then, he used screw threads on the lugs outside which are locking into the matching threaded receiver. Some very scarce Mk II** with the same threaded lugs and receiver are known to exist. He also used the same shape of heavy barrel as used on the Mk II**. The M-10, in .280 Ross, is considered by many as being the finest rifle ever made by the Ross Rifle Co.

- Model R-10; .303 Brit.

Model E-10; .303 Brit and .35 WCF

Model M-10; .280 Ross

The .22 rimfire sporting rifle was introduced in 1912. While using a simpler mechanism, it was still a straight-pull action. This model was very popular in Canada.

- Model 1912 Cadet Commercial.
- Model 1912 Cadet "Leftover" (no serial numbers or any other markings)

The problems with the Ross in combat were that it was really a sporting design of rifle asked to do the work of a military rifle under trench warfare conditions. However, as a sporting rifle, the Ross became quite popular after the war. The new .280 Ross cartridge gained it a fine reputation for medium-sized game, and for a time after 1918 it was a fairly common rifle on safari. It also proved itself as being an outstanding Match Rifle, building a strong reputation for accuracy.

Match rifles

Ross Mark II** Commercial Target Model in .303 British, with a 30 1/2 inches (770 mm) heavy barrel, was a real success in the Match Ranges from 1908 to 1913. This rifle was looking like the military Mk II**, using the same bolt, except having the sight bridge mounted on the receiver. A scarce Presentation Target Rifle was also available. Unlike its military counterpart, it had the serial number stamped on the barrel.

Model 1907 and 1905/1910 Match Target Rifle These very important single-shot rifles (two rifles are known to exist) are bearing special feature that would make the M1910 so different; the threaded locking lugs and receiver.

Military Match Target Rifle unlike the military Mk III this rifle was using a box type magazine with flat floorplate. It was using the Ross Mk III military sight modified to fit the .280 Ross ammunitions. Barrel was 26 inches long.

== Developments ==
After the rejection of the Ross as a battlefield rifle, the Dominion Rifle Factory adapted the action to a light machinegun, the Huot, using surplus rifles. These were cheaper than the Lewis guns then in use. They were subjected to extensive trials, but the war ended before they entered service.

== Other users ==
British Coast guard units in Ireland were armed with Ross rifles during 1920 to 1921.

After the First World War, the British Empire supplied several models of .303 cal rifles, including Rosses to Estonia, Latvia, Armenia and White Russian anti-communist forces. In the course of gaining control of the country, the Soviets captured large numbers of non Soviet origin rifles. In the 1930s Stalin approved aid shipments to the Spanish Civil War Republicans, disposals actually, of American Winchester M1895 Muskets, German Mauser 98s, British Lee Enfields, Austrian Mannlichers, and several French types. One shipment from the Baltic Sea port of Memel on 6 Nov 1936, included 18,000-odd Pattern '14s and 2310 Canadian .303 M10 Rosses. Reports suggest few of donated rifles were militarily effective due to insufficient ammunition supplies.

Ross rifles were issued once again in the Second World War. The Mark 3 Ross rifle was supplied to the Royal Canadian Navy, the Veteran's Guard of Canada, coastal defence units, training depots, the British Home Guard, Metropolitan Police, London Fire Brigade, Port of London Authority Police and the Soviets.

Ross Rifles were collected hurriedly from stocks held in the Shetland Islands in May 1942 to re-equip the survivors of Operation Fritham in Spitsbergen who had lost everything when their ship was sunk. The Ross rifles and equipment being delivered by Catalina 210/P captained by Flying Officer Tim Healy.

In the 1950s straight-pull Rosses were well known in European sport shooting for biathlon and running deer disciplines. During the World Shooting Championships in Moscow, visiting shooters were allowed to sign for Ross rifles converted to 7.62x54R to try out the competitions. Before biathlon switched to .22LR rifles, it was fired with full-bore cartridge rifles. While various models of Swedish Carl-Gustav rifle were popular, Soviet biathletes had success with Ross rifles outfitted with slings, target sights and 3-position stocks.

== Users ==
- Canada – Standard issue rifle of the CEF from 1905 to 1916, where it was replaced with the SMLE MK. III and MK. III*. Still used by snipers throughout the war for its accuracy.
- Chile – In 1920, Britain finally delivered the Almirante Latorre (HMS Canada), which had been sold to Chile, but had been compulsorily purchased by the British government after World War I broke out. Aboard the ship were 200 Mk III Ross rifles which became property of the Chilean Navy.
- China – British born Morris Cohen, a General for Sun Yat-sen, acquired 500 Ross rifles (probably Mark I) for the Chinese in 1911, described as "weren't up to much, but good enough for training". He made a second trip to Canada in 1925 to buy more Ross rifles, but it is unknown if any were acquired.
- Estonia – The British supplied Mk III Rosses to the Baltic states after World War I which wound up in the hands of the Soviet Union after their occupation in 1940.
- France – An off-hand comment by Sir Charles Ross, stating that the French "never complained" about his rifles, leads some to believe that some Ross rifles may have been supplied to the French during World War I.
- Germany – Some were captured and used by the Germans during World War I.
  - Germany - Ross rifles captured from Canadian soldiers designated the Gewehr 280(e). Ross rifles captured from Soviet soldiers designated the Gewehr 280(r).
- Haganah – The Haganah (Jewish paramilitary organization in the British Mandate of Palestine) purchased and used the Ross Rifles during the 1947–1949 Palestine war. The rifles were called "Canadian Rifles" by the Haganah soldiers.
- India – Around 8,000 Mk III Rosses were supplied to India in 1942 for "police duty", but were withdrawn in 1943.
- Indonesia – The Mk III Rosses supplied to the Netherlands are believed to have remained in Indonesia.
- Latvia – Mk IIIB Ross rifles were used by newly formed Latvian army during the Latvian War of Independence. They were delivered, together with ammunition and other war materials, by British warships. After the war, Ross rifles became the standard-issue service rifle of Latvian army, since the decision was taken to standardize rifle calibers to British .303. The rifles were also issued to members of the Aizsargi paramilitary guard and, since 1928, the Latvian police.
- Lithuania – The British supplied Mk III Rosses to the Baltic states after World War I which wound up in the hands of the Soviet Union after their occupation in 1940. The Lithuanian Army had bought 55,000 rifles with about 50–60 million rounds for a low price in Italy in 1924, after the Lithuanian Wars of Independence. They were mainly distributed among infantry regiments, although they were disliked, as they weren't as accurate as the Mauser rifles. At the first opportunity, the rifles were sold, gaining good profit, with the resulting money being used to order Mauser rifles at the Belgian Fabrique Nationale d'Armes de Guerre and the Czechoslovak Brno weapons factory.
- Luxembourg – Issued to the Grand Ducal Guard in 1945, replaced by Lee–Enfield in the same year.
- Netherlands – Britain is believed to have supplied Mk III Rosses to Netherlands forces bound for Indonesian "police actions", issued from stores at Woerden.
- New Zealand – The British shipped some 300 Mk III Rosses to the New Zealand division of the Royal Navy, and these weapons transferred the Royal New Zealand Navy in 1941 to see active duty during World War II.
- Norway – In May 1942, some Free Norwegian troops were re-supplied at Spitzbergen with Ross Mk III rifles after their original weapons were lost at sea.
- Soviet Union – The British supplied Mk III Rosses to the Baltic states after World War I which wound up in the hands of the Soviet Union after their occupation in 1940. Some of these were supplied to Republican forces for the Spanish Civil War. Some additional weapons are thought to have been supplied under a lend-lease arrangement during World War II, though this has never been verified. In 1954, Ross Mk IIIs converted to Russian 7.62mm ammunition were used successfully in the World Shooting Championships in Caracas.
- Spain – The Soviets are believed to have supplied Ross Mk III rifles to Spanish Republican forces during the Spanish Civil War. These weapons were used by Canadian and American volunteer units and were originally believed to have been supplied by Canada, which the Canadian government denied.
- United Kingdom – issued to the Royal Navy to free up Lee–Enfields for land use. Used on minesweepers to detonate floating mines with rifle fire. The home guard had a number of Ross Mark IIIB rifles that were previously purchased in World War I. These were supplemented with 75,000 Ross Mark III rifles supplied by the Canadian government.
- United States – The US purchased 20,000 Mk II^{3}* for use as training rifles for World War I.
- White Movement – The British supplied arms (probably including Mk III Rosses) to the White Movement after World War I which most likely fell into the hands of the Soviet Union after the end of the Russian Civil War. Around 1,000 rifles were issued with little proof of them being used or even working. Most of the shipments sent were captured by the Red Army.

== See also ==
- Huot automatic rifle
