= .404 Jeffery =

Rifle cartridge

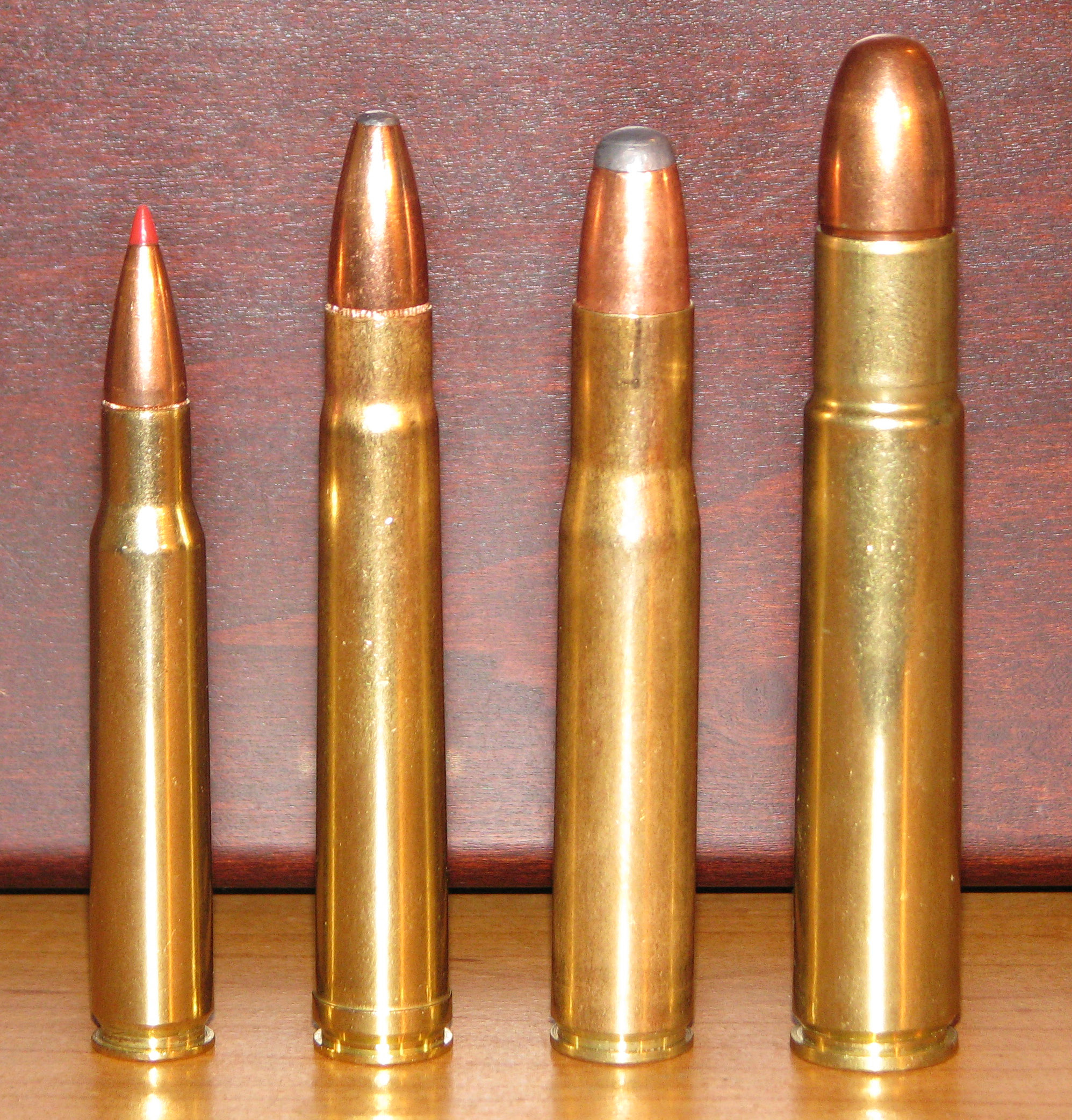
- L/R: .30-06 Springfield, .375 H&H Magnum, .404 Jeffery, .505 Gibbs
- Type: Rifle
- Place of origin: England

Production history
- Designer: W. J. Jeffery & Co.
- Designed: 1905
- Produced: 1905–present

Specifications
- Case type: Rimless, bottleneck
- Bullet diameter: 10.72 mm (0.422 in)
- Land diameter: 10.46 mm (0.412 in)
- Neck diameter: 11.48 mm (0.452 in)
- Shoulder diameter: 13.46 mm (0.530 in)
- Base diameter: 13.84 mm (0.545 in)
- Rim diameter: 13.79 mm (0.543 in)
- Rim thickness: 1.27 mm (0.050 in)
- Case length: 73.02 mm (2.875 in)
- Overall length: 89.66 mm (3.530 in)
- Case capacity: 7.32 cm^{3} (113.0 gr H_{2}O)
- Rifling twist: 1 in 16.5 in (420 mm)
- Primer type: Large rifle magnum
- Maximum pressure (C.I.P.): 365.00 MPa (52,939 psi)

Ballistic performance
Bullet mass/type	Velocity	Energy
300 gr (19 g) SP	2,600 ft/s (790 m/s)	4,600 ft⋅lbf (6,200 J)
400 gr (26 g) FMJ/SP	2,125 ft/s (648 m/s)	4,020 ft⋅lbf (5,450 J)
400 gr (26 g) FMJ/SP (modern)	2,300 ft/s (700 m/s)	4,700 ft⋅lbf (6,400 J)
450 gr (29 g) FMJ/SP	2,150 ft/s (660 m/s)	4,620 ft⋅lbf (6,260 J)
- Test barrel length: 610 millimetres (24 in); Sources: Cartridges of the World, Ammo Encyclopedia, Kynoch & Norma

The .404 Jeffery is a rifle cartridge designed for hunting large, dangerous game animals, such as the "Big Five" (elephant, rhino, cape buffalo, lion and leopard) of Africa. The cartridge is standardized by the C.I.P. and is also known as .404 Rimless Nitro Express (Riml. N.E.). It was designed in 1905 by London based gunmaker W. J. Jeffery & Co. to duplicate the performance of the .450/400 Nitro Express 3-inch in bolt-action rifles. The .404 Jeffery fires a bullet .422 inches (10.7 mm) in diameter of either 300 grains (19 g) with a muzzle velocity of 2,600 feet per second (790 m/s) and muzzle energy of 4,500 foot-pounds force (6,100 N⋅m) or 400 gr (26 g) with a muzzle velocity of 2,150 ft/s (660 m/s) and 4,100 ft⋅lbf (5,600 N⋅m) of energy. It is very effective on large game and is favored by many hunters of dangerous game. The .404 Jeffery was popular with hunters and game wardens in Africa because of its good performance with manageable recoil. By way of comparison, the .416 Rigby and .416 Remington Magnum cartridges fire .416 in (10.6 mm) bullets of 400 gr (26 g) at 2,400 ft/s (730 m/s) with a muzzle energy of approximately 5,000 ft⋅lbf (6,800 N⋅m). These cartridges exceed the ballistic performance of the .404 Jeffery but at the price of greater recoil and, in the case of the .416 Rigby, rifles that are more expensive.

== History ==
Originally the .404 Jeffery was very popular with hunters in Africa and saw significant use in both British and German colonies. As the British Empire began to shrink, many of the popular British big-bore cartridges also dwindled in popularity, and the .404 Jeffery was one of them. By the 1960s it had all but disappeared from common firearm usage. This condition was mostly the result of the closing of the British ammunition giant Kynoch, which was the primary manufacturer of the .404 Jeffery and many other British cartridges. The introduction of the .458 Winchester Magnum in 1956 in the Winchester Model 70 bolt-action rifle provided an affordable alternative to the big Nitro Express rifles and cartridges. Winchester also started a marketing campaign at about this time called "Winchester in Africa" with much success. Renewed interest in heavy game rifles combined with political stability in Africa has led to a resurgence in African hunting and the rifles suited for it. Several ammunition makers like Kynoch, Norma, Federal, and Hornady are offering .404 Jeffery sporting ammunition.

A more recent development by Norma of Sweden has been the introduction of 400 gr (26 g) & 450 gr (29 g) ammunition under their African PH banner. The increase in bullet weight and sectional density improves the ballistics of the .404 Jeffery. With velocities of 2,325 ft/s (709 m/s) & muzzle energy of 4,802 ft⋅lbf (6,511 J) (400 gr) and 2,150 ft/s (660 m/s) & 4,620 ft⋅lbf (6,260 J) (450 gr), the cartridge is almost as powerful as the .416 Rigby, with a relatively mild recoil due to the efficient design of the cartridge.

== Commercial variations ==
In 1908, W. J. Jeffery & Co. created the .333 Jeffery by shortening the .404 case, giving it greater taper and necking it down to .333 inches (8.5 mm). In 1913, Jeffery further necked down the .333 Jeffery to .288 inches, creating the .280 Jeffery.

In the early 1990s, the .404 case has seen a resurgence in use due to an renewed interest in African hunting, and for use by wildcatters. This case has no belt, unlike many other magnum cartridges, which can be desirable for handloading because of possible problems with case head separation with repeated reloading of belted magnum cartridges. The rimless design also contributes to smooth feeding from the box magazine of bolt-action rifles.

Some common commercial children of the .404 Jeffery case are the Remington Ultra Magnum (RUM) cartridge family, which in turn spawned the Remington Short Action Ultra Magnum (RSAUM) cartridges. Also, the Winchester Short Magnum (WSM) and the Winchester Super Short Magnum (WSSM) families are derived from the .404 Jeffery case. Both the Winchester and Remington cartridges have also spawned many current wildcats, like the popular .338 Edge.

All but one (.450 Dakota, based on .416 Rigby) of the proprietary cartridges of Dakota Arms such as .375 Dakota, and the .400 Tembo by Velocity USA, and the once-famous .460 G&A, used by Jeff Cooper in his "baby" rifles, are based on .404 Jeffery.

More examples of the popularity of creating small-bore, high-velocity cartridges based on the .404 Jeffery design are the .26 Nosler, .28 Nosler, .30 Nosler, and the .33 Nosler, introduced by Nosler between 2013 and 2016.

== See also ==
- 10 mm caliber
- List of rifle cartridges
- Table of handgun and rifle cartridges
