= .333 Jeffery =

Rifle cartridge

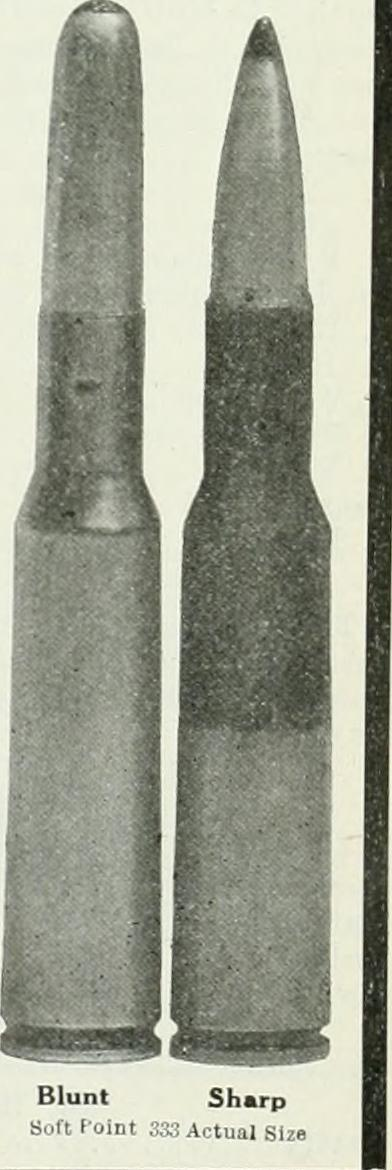
- Type: Rifle
- Place of origin: United Kingdom

Service history
- In service: UK
- Used by: British Army
- Wars: World War I

Production history
- Designer: W. J. Jeffery & Co.
- Designed: 1908
- Manufacturer: W. J. Jeffery & Co.

Specifications
- Parent case: .404 Jeffery
- Case type: Rimless, bottlenecked
- Bullet diameter: .333 in (8.5 mm)
- Neck diameter: .359 in (9.1 mm)
- Shoulder diameter: .496 in (12.6 mm)
- Base diameter: .540 in (13.7 mm)
- Rim diameter: .538 in (13.7 mm)
- Rim thickness: .050 in (1.3 mm)
- Case length: 2.48 in (63 mm)
- Overall length: 3.48 in (88 mm)
- Case capacity: 84.0 gr H_{2}O (5.44 cm^{3})
- Primer type: Kynoch # 59
- Maximum pressure: 46,000 psi (320 MPa)

Ballistic performance
Bullet mass/type	Velocity	Energy
250 gr (16 g) SP	2,500 ft/s (760 m/s)	3,480 ft⋅lbf (4,720 J)
300 gr (19 g) SP	2,200 ft/s (670 m/s)	3,230 ft⋅lbf (4,380 J)
- Test barrel length: 28 inches Sources: Kynoch & Barnes

.333 Jeffery Flanged

Specifications
- Case type: Rimmed, bottlenecked
- Bullet diameter: .333 in (8.5 mm)
- Neck diameter: .356 in (9.0 mm)
- Shoulder diameter: .484 in (12.3 mm)
- Base diameter: .544 in (13.8 mm)
- Rim diameter: .625 in (15.9 mm)
- Case length: 2.50 in (64 mm)
- Overall length: 3.49 in (89 mm)
- Primer type: large rifle

Ballistic performance
Bullet mass/type	Velocity	Energy
250 gr (16 g) SP	2,400 ft/s (730 m/s)	3,200 ft⋅lbf (4,300 J)
300 gr (19 g) SP	2,150 ft/s (660 m/s)	3,090 ft⋅lbf (4,190 J)
- Test barrel length: 28 inches Sources: Kynoch & Barnes.

The .333 Jeffery and .333 Jeffery Flanged are medium-bore rifle cartridges developed by W. J. Jeffery & Co. and introduced in 1908.

== Design ==
The .333 Jeffery and the .333 Jeffery Flanged are both bottlenecked centerfire rifle cartridges. Originally both cartridges were released with two factory loads, one with a bullet of 250 grains (16 g) and the other with a bullet of 300 grains (19 g).

=== .333 Jeffery ===
The .333 Jeffery, also known as the .333 Jeffery Rimless Nitro Express or as the .333 Rimless Nitro Express, is a rimless cartridge intended for use in magazine rifles. It is derived from the .404 Jeffery and can be used in both standard and magnum-length Mauser 98 actions. It fires the 250-grain bullet at 2,500 feet per second (760 m/s) and the 300-grain bullet at 2,200 feet per second (670 m/s).

=== .333 Jeffery Flanged ===
The .333 Jeffery Flanged or .333 Flanged Nitro Express is the rimmed version of the .333 Jeffery, intended for use in single-shot and double rifles. It is loaded to slightly lower velocities than the rimless .333 Jeffery, firing the 250-grain bullet at 2,400 feet per second (730 m/s) and the 300-grain bullet at 2,150 feet per second (660 m/s).

== History ==
Upon its introduction in 1908, the .333 Jeffery firing the 300 grain bullet quickly developed an excellent reputation due to the very high sectional density and exceptional penetration of the round. Unfortunately the original 250 grain bullet was a copper-capped hollowpoint that was too fragile to be fired at 2,500 feet per second, making it unpopular and marring the .333 Jeffery's reputation for some time. The .333 Jeffery Flanged never enjoyed the popularity of its rimless counterpart, this has been attributed to Jeffery's initial reluctance to regulate double rifles in this round for the 300 grain loading.

The .333 Jeffery was somewhat overshadowed by the arrival of the .375 Holland & Holland in 1912. As with many British proprietary cartridges, the .333 Jeffery was forced into obsolescence when Kynoch suspended ammunition manufacturing in the 1960s, Kynamco resumed manufacture of the Kynoch range of cartridges in the 1990s meaning the ammunition is again commercially available, although no firearms manufacturers make factory rifles in .333 Jeffery today.

== Use ==
The .333 Jeffery was not intended for dangerous game; however, due to the excellent penetration of the 300-grain round, it has been used successfully on all African game species up to and including elephant. In his African Rifles and Cartridges, John "Pondoro" Taylor wrote of the .333 Jeffery, "Time and again have I driven it the length of an animal's body, and cut the perfectly mushroomed bullet out of his hindquarters. I have never had one break up."

Sir Alfred Sharpe used a bolt-actioned .333 Jeffery rifle extensively for hunting in Africa, using it to hunt elephant and other game.

The cartridge was very similar in performance to the .318 Westley Richards. The .280 Jeffery was created by W. J. Jeffery & Co. by necking down the .333 Jeffery to .288 inches (7.3 mm).

== WWI service ==
In 1914 and early 1915, German snipers were engaging British Army positions with impunity from behind steel plates that were impervious to .303 British ball ammunition. In an attempt to counter this threat, the British War Office purchased a number of larger calibre sporting rifles from British rifle makers, including .333 Jeffery rifles.

In his Sniping in France 1914-18, MAJ H. Hesketh-Prichard, DSO, MC, stated "I proceeded to try on these plates all kinds of rifles, from Jeffery's high velocity .333 to heavy elephant guns of various bores, and was delighted to find the bullets from the .333, as well as the elephant guns, pierced them like butter."

== See also ==
- 8 mm caliber
- List of rifle cartridges
- Nitro Express
