= .276 Enfield =

British experimental rifle cartridge

- .276 Enfield experimental rifle cartridge
- Type: Rifle
- Place of origin: United Kingdom

Production history
- Designer: Royal Laboratory
- Designed: 1912
- Produced: 1912–1916

Specifications
- Case type: Rebated, tapered, bottleneck
- Bullet diameter: .282 in (7.2 mm)
- Neck diameter: .323 in (8.2 mm)
- Shoulder diameter: .460 in (11.7 mm)
- Base diameter: .528 in (13.4 mm)
- Rim diameter: .517 in (13.1 mm)
- Case length: 2.35 in (60 mm)
- Overall length: 3.23 in (82 mm)
- Case capacity: 72 gr H_{2}O (4.7 cm^{3})
- Rifling twist: 1 in 10" (254 mm)
- Primer type: Berdan
- Maximum CUP: 50,763 CUP

Ballistic performance
Bullet mass/type	Velocity	Energy
165 gr (11 g)	2,785 ft/s (849 m/s)	2,842 ft⋅lbf (3,853 J)
- Sources: Major E. G. B. Reynolds (1960). The Lee-Enfield Rifle (PDF). London, Reading and Fakenham: Cox and Wyman Limited. p. 126.

The .276 Enfield (7×60mmRB) was an experimental rebated rim tapered bottlenecked centerfire military rifle cartridge developed in conjunction with the Pattern 1913 Enfield (P'13) rifle. Development was discontinued by the onset of World War I.

== History ==
During the Second Boer War, British authorities were obliged to re-evaluate rifle and ammunition design and tactics after facing Boer sharpshooters and snipers armed with Mauser Model 1895 rifles firing 7×57mm Mauser rounds with withering effectiveness, easily outranging the .303 British Mark II cartridge as regards accurate long-range fire.

=== Government driven efforts to improve performance ===
The .276 Enfield was designed with the intent of being more powerful than the .303 British cartridge used in the Lee–Enfield rifles and to be at least similar in size and performance to other large, powerful early 20th century military rifle cartridges, like the .280 Ross, 7.92×57mm Mauser, .30-06 Springfield and 7.5×55mm Swiss GP11. Before arriving on the RL18000C 1913 trials round, dozens of .256 and .276 cartridge case and projectile iterations were developed and tested over several years. The longest .276 cartridge iterations featured an overall length of 3.587 in (91.11 mm) and a case length of 2.76 in (70.10 mm). Cartridge case design RL18000 emerged as the likely final choice with various .276 spitzer bullets of 165 gr (10.69 g), 175 gr (11.34 g) and 188 gr (12.18 g) lengths. The Small Arms Committee decided all were generally acceptable, but preferred the 165 gr (10.69 g) projectile design as the trajectory was flatter to 800 yd (732 m) than the 175 gr (11.34 g) projectile. They recommended that one thousand rifles should be made up for troop trials.

To allow for the larger dimensions and higher muzzle energy .276 cartridge a new experimental rifle was developed. The experimental Pattern 1913 Enfield rifle featured a modified Mauser-type action that was very substantial and designed to be stronger than the Lee–Enfield action. While the .303 British round has a larger-diameter projectile than the .276 Enfield, the .276 Enfield cartridge case is larger and contains more propellant developing higher chamber pressures and higher muzzle velocities; as such, it is more powerful than the .303 British. The .303 British Mark VII round introduced in 1910 to which the British eventually modernized, for instance, has a projectile weight of 174 gr (11.28 g) and a muzzle velocity of 2,441 ft/s (744 m/s), while the .276 has a projectile weight of 165 gr (10.69 g) and a muzzle velocity of 2,785 ft/s (849 m/s) and a trajectory vertex at 800 yd (732 m) of 5.23 ft (1.59 m) against 9 ft (2.74 m) for the .303 Mk VII round.

The combination of a slimmer more aerodynamic projectile—reverse engineering the trajectory from the previous paragraph indicates a ballistic coefficient (G1 BC) of approximately 0.55—with a higher sectional density propelled at a higher muzzle velocity and designed to travel at faster velocities, gave the .276 Enfield better ballistics than the .303 British Mark VII. The .276 Enfield was also rimless to ensure greater reliability in magazine-fed weapons, a problem with the older .303 British round. However, due to the approach of World War I, the .276 Enfield was not implemented for military service.

== 1913 troop trials ==
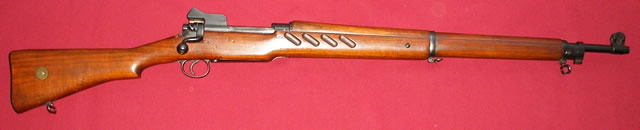
Pattern 1913 Enfield experimental rifle

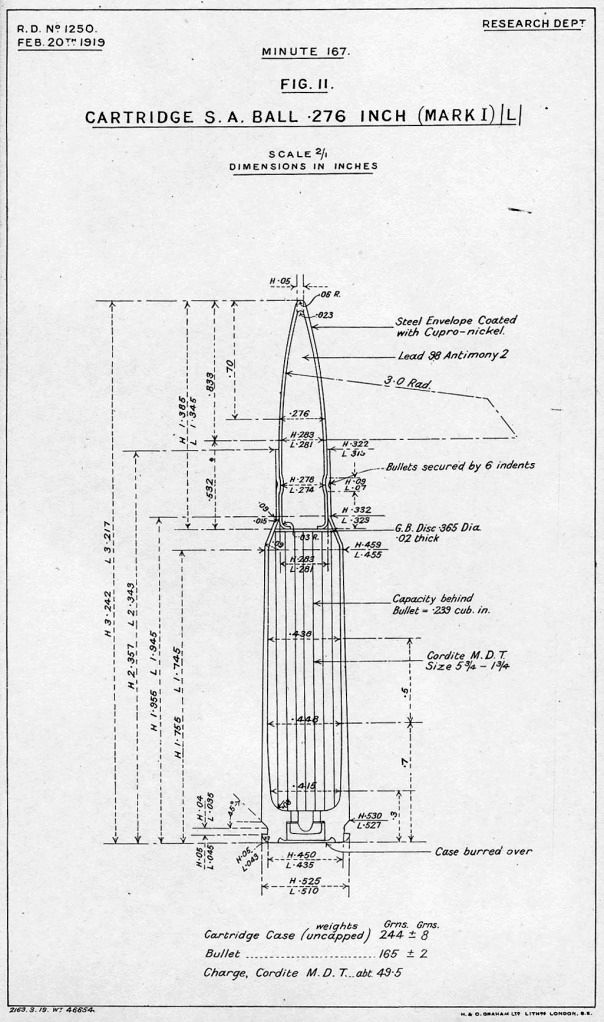
Drawing of the (Experimental) Cartridge S.A. Ball .276 inch Mark I L

Several developmental versions of ammunition were prepared beginning in 1910, before approximately 1,000 Pattern 1913 Enfield rifles with 600,000 rounds of RL18000C trials cartridges were distributed to troops in 1913. The troop trial rifles' left handed rifling twist rate was 1 in 10 in (254 mm), with 5 grooves, and a groove depth of .005 inches (0.127 mm) and land width of .09352 inches (2.375 mm). The troop trial RL18000C cartridges had slightly thinner case walls than earlier RL1800 iterations to increase powder capacity and an annular groove around the primer to prevent "caps out". The primer caps were made of copper containing 0.6 gr (0.04 g) of priming composition. The great majority of troop trial ammunition was manufactured by the Royal Laboratory with the headstamp simply "R^L", but it was also made by Kings Norton, Kynoch and Greenwood and Batley. Although the troop trial round was never formally approved, it was referred to as "Cartridge S.A. Ball .276 inch Mark I" in some documents and on the packet labels. The troop trial rifles and ammunition were distributed to the musketry school at Hythe, to one squadron in each of three cavalry regiments, and to one company in each of eight infantry battalions. One of the cavalry squadrons was stationed in South Africa and one of the infantry companies was stationed in Egypt. The remainder of the units were in the United Kingdom. Cartridges were packaged in 5-round stripper clips similar to those used by the Mauser Gewehr 98 and M1903 Springfield rifles. Ball ammunition was loaded with 49.3 gr (3.19 g) of cordite MDT 5 3/4-1 3/4 (cordite MD pressed into tubes) behind 165 gr (10.69 g) cupronickel-jacketed .282 in (7.16 mm) diameter 1.365 in (34.67 mm) long spitzer bullets. The bullet core was made of 98% lead and 2% antimony alloy. Drill rounds containing no primer or powder have been reported in two versions. One has a tin-plated case with the standard bullet, and the other has a round-nose wood bullet with an unplated brass case.

Inert Dummy or Inspection RL20408 blank and proof ammunition was also produced based on the case of RL 18000C. Proof test ammunition was made in a RL 18000.B(i) variant for use with pressure barrels and a RL 18000.B(j) variant for proofing rifles. The 50,763 CUP maximum pressure for this cartridge translated to being similar to the Pmax piezo pressure used in C.I.P. regulated countries and SAAMI maximum average pressure (MAP) to the .30-06 Springfield cartridge rated at 50,000 CUP.

The troop trial results reported the cartridge produced heavy metal fouling in the bore, heavy recoil, very loud report, undesirable muzzle flash, overheated rifle barrels, and difficulty in extraction (especially with a heated rifle). Overheating caused excessive barrel wear, unintentional premature discharges due to heat in the surrounding environment, and some potentially dangerous pressure indications from cooked off cartridges in (pre-heated) hot barrels, generating (excessive) chamber pressures of about 64,960 psi (447.9 MPa) (about 54,658 CUP). As a safety precaution, the programme was amended so that not more than fifteen rounds were fired without the rifle being allowed to cool off.

By mid-1913, it became clear that until a suitable propellant with a more moderate combustion temperature than cordite had been developed the new cartridge and rifle could not be passed for service. Work continued into 1914 on both the propellant and the metal fouling problems, but the outbreak of war brought work to a close in August 1914. Rather than confront continued development of a new cartridge simultaneously with inevitable wartime production problems, the United Kingdom continued manufacturing .303 British caliber Lee–Enfield rifles as the standard military arm through the first world war. Canada, on the other hand, had some experience with the similar .280 Ross cartridge and appears to have taken interest in potential use of the P13 rifles to arm newly mobilized troops. Canada contracted with Winchester Repeating Arms to manufacture ammunition until more suitable rifles became available for standard issue.

In August 1916, Winchester Repeating Arms made a batch of .276 inch rounds, apparently to the RL18000C design. It is known that this contract was placed by the Canadian authorities but the reason is unknown.

Ammunition is known to have been manufactured by:

- Royal Laboratory (headstamped R^L)
- Kings Norton Metal Company (headstamped KN, some with date 13)
- Greenwood & Batley (headstamped GB or G&B)
- Kynoch (headstamped K)
- Winchester (headstamped WRA Co. 8-16)

== Subsequent developments ==
The Pattern 1913 Enfield (P'13) rifle design was modified as the Pattern 14 Rifle (P'14) chambered for the .303 British cartridge. Production was initially assigned to Vickers, but tooling was shortly passed to United States manufacturers so Vickers could focus on machine gun production. Remington Arms and Winchester manufactured 1,233,075 P'14 rifles for the United Kingdom in 1915 and 1916. Remington subcontracted the largest share of production to the Baldwin Locomotive Works Eddystone Arsenal. The design was modified again as the M1917 Enfield rifle chambered for the .30-06 Springfield cartridge, of which, Remington, Winchester and Baldwin manufactured 2,193,429 for the United States. Approximately 75% of the American Expeditionary Forces carried M1917 rifles into combat. Nearly half of these M1917 rifles were sent to the United Kingdom as Lend-Lease in the early days of World War II. Remington modified the design again as the basis of their model 30, 30S, and 720 rifles for civilian production.

The .276 Enfield case was necked up to .303 caliber to produce the .303 Magnum for various armor-piercing bullet tests conducted in the United Kingdom between 1922 and 1935. Furthermore, it has been noted that the .276 Enfield cartridge performs similarly to the 1917 German 7×64mm cartridge that is rated at 50,500 CUP maximum pressure.

=== Propellant development ===
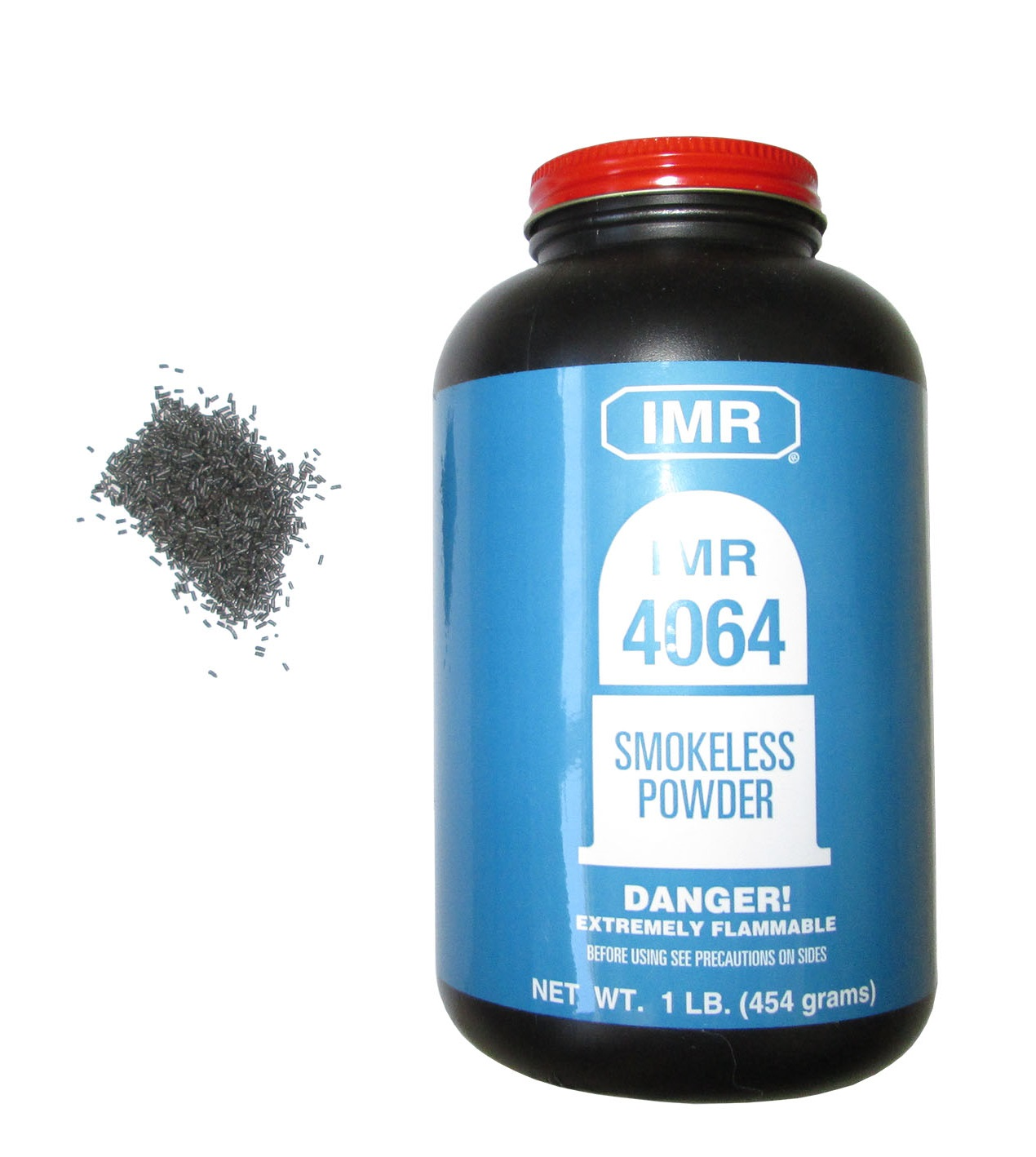
IMR 4064 powder

The lack of a suitable (cooler-burning) propellant led to the design in 1914 of Improved Military Rifle (IMR) tubular nitrocellulose smokeless powder # 15 as a replacement for cordite for the .276 Enfield cartridge. In 1919, IMR # 15 1/2 added 2% tin to IMR # 15 to reduce metal fouling from cupronickel-jacketed bullets. IMR # 4064 replaced both powders in 1935, and has been available since.

== See also ==
- List of rebated rim cartridges
- 7 mm caliber
- .275 H&H Magnum
- List of rifle cartridges
