= .303 Magnum =

Centerfire rifle cartridge

- Type: Rifle
- Place of origin: England

Production history
- Designer: W. J. Jeffery & Co.
- Designed: 1919
- Produced: 1919–1932

Specifications
- Parent case: .276 Enfield
- Case type: Semi-rimmed or rimless, bottleneck
- Bullet diameter: .312 in (7.9 mm)
- Neck diameter: .345 in (8.8 mm)
- Shoulder diameter: .462 in (11.7 mm)
- Base diameter: .530 in (13.5 mm)
- Rim diameter: .557 in (14.1 mm)
- Case length: 2.35 in (60 mm)
- Overall length: 3.35 in (85 mm)
- Case capacity: 73.6 gr H_{2}O (4.77 cm^{3})

Ballistic performance
Bullet mass/type	Velocity	Energy
174 gr (11 g)	2,850 ft/s (870 m/s)	3,050 ft⋅lbf (4,140 J)
- Source: Cartridges of the World.

The .303 Magnum is an obsolete medium bore rifle cartridge.

== Overview ==
The .303 Magnum was a bottlenecked centerfire rifle cartridge that was produced in both semi-rimmed and rimless versions. The cartridge fired a projectile of 174 grains (11.3 g) at 2,850 feet per second (870 m/s). The cartridge's case capacity was the same as the .30-06 Springfield, although performance was considered to favour the .303 Magnum.

The .303 Magnum was developed by W. J. Jeffery & Co. by necking up the experimental .276 Enfield to .312 inches (7.9 mm), it was introduced in 1919 for target shooting and was used for some time by the British Match Rifle Committee. The cartridge had a brief life, only appearing in the Kynoch catalogue until 1930 and it appears to have become obsolete by 1932.

== See also ==
- .303 British
- 7mm rifle cartridges
- List of rifle cartridges
