= .280 Flanged =

Rimmed, bottleneck, centerfire rifle cartridge

.280 Flanged Nitro Express
- Type: Rifle
- Place of origin: England

Production history
- Designer: Charles Lancaster
- Designed: 1906

Specifications
- Case type: Rimmed, bottleneck
- Bullet diameter: .287 in (7.3 mm)
- Neck diameter: .316 in (8.0 mm)
- Shoulder diameter: .423 in (10.7 mm)
- Base diameter: .535 in (13.6 mm)
- Rim diameter: .607 in (15.4 mm)
- Rim thickness: UNK
- Case length: 2.6 in (66 mm)
- Overall length: 3.62 in (92 mm)
- Primer type: Kynoch # 60

Ballistic performance
Bullet mass/type	Velocity	Energy
140 gr (9 g) SP	2,900 ft/s (880 m/s)	2,620 ft⋅lbf (3,550 J)
150 gr (10 g) SP	2,800 ft/s (850 m/s)	2,610 ft⋅lbf (3,540 J)
160 gr (10 g) SP	2,700 ft/s (820 m/s)	2,600 ft⋅lbf (3,500 J)
180 gr (12 g) SP	2,550 ft/s (780 m/s)	2,600 ft⋅lbf (3,500 J)
- Source: Cartridges of the world.

The .280 Flanged Nitro Express, also known as the .280 Lancaster, is an obsolete rimmed bottleneck centerfire rifle cartridge developed by Charles Lancaster and introduced in 1906.

== Overview ==
The introduction of the semi-rimmed .280 Ross in 1906 caused considerable interest amongst sportsmen and gunmakers. Gunmakers Charles Lancaster introduced the rimmed .280 Flanged Nitro Express later by in the same year for use in single shot and double rifles. The .280 Flanged Nitro Express is very similar to the .280 Ross, although loaded to slightly lower velocities.

Like the .280 Ross, the popularity of the .280 Flanged Nitro Express waned after a number of hunters were killed by the dangerous game they were attempting to hunt with the cartridge.

The .280 Flanged Nitro Express was said to have been a favourite of King George V.

== See also ==
- List of rifle cartridges
- Nitro Express
