= .280 Jeffery =

UK centerfire rifle cartridge

- Type: Rifle
- Place of origin: England

Production history
- Designer: W. J. Jeffery & Co.
- Designed: 1913
- Produced: 1913–present

Specifications
- Parent case: .333 Jeffery
- Case type: Rimless, bottleneck
- Bullet diameter: .288 in (7.3 mm)
- Neck diameter: .317 in (8.1 mm)
- Shoulder diameter: .504 in (12.8 mm)
- Base diameter: .542 in (13.8 mm)
- Rim diameter: .538 in (13.7 mm)
- Case length: 2.50 in (64 mm)
- Overall length: 3.45 in (88 mm)
- Primer type: .217/59

Ballistic performance
Bullet mass/type	Velocity	Energy
140 gr (9 g)	3,000 ft/s (910 m/s)	2,800 ft⋅lbf (3,800 J)
- Source: Cartridges of the World.

The .280 Jeffery, also known as the .280 Jeffery Rimless Nitro Express and the .33/280 Jeffery, is a rimless bottleneck centerfire rifle cartridge developed by W. J. Jeffery & Co. and introduced in 1913.

== Overview ==
The cartridge was created by Jeffery by necking down their successful .333 Jeffery to .288 inches. The .280 Jeffery's performance is comparable to the .280 Ross, the cartridge is larger than the Ross with greater capacity, but it is typically not loaded for greater velocities.

The .280 Jeffery fires a 140 gr projectile at 3000 fps.

== See also ==
- 7mm rifle cartridges
- Nitro Express
- List of rifle cartridges
