= .280 Ross =

Rifle cartridge

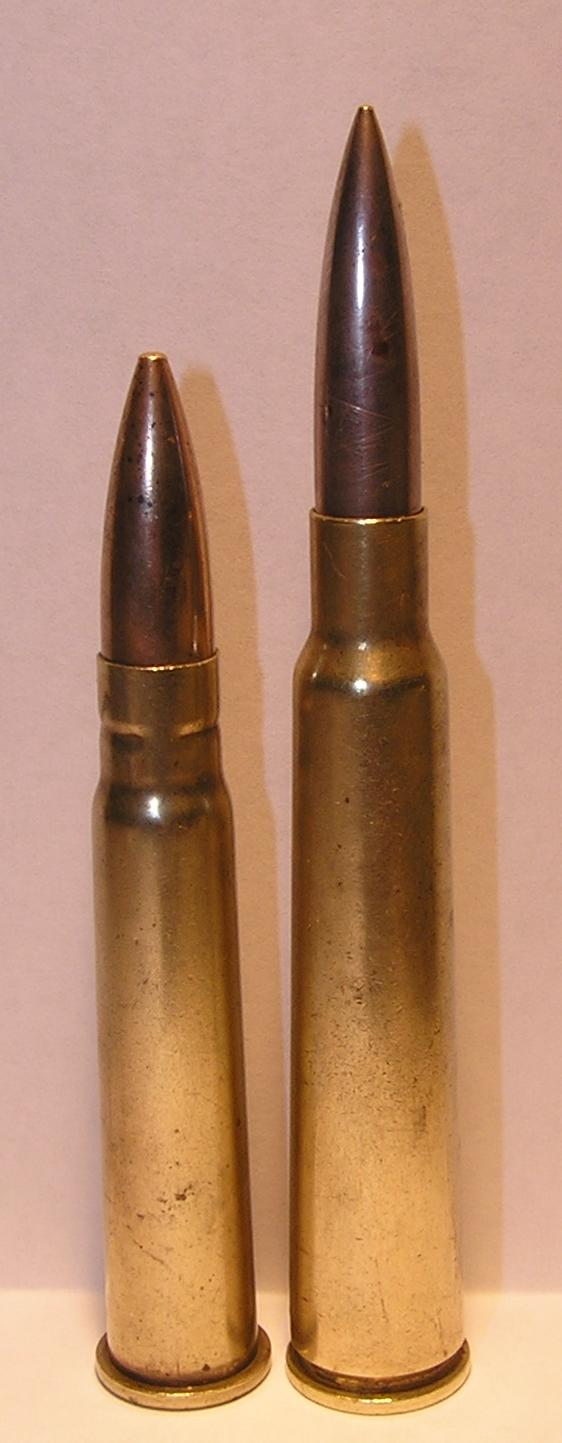
- .303 British next to the .280 Ross cartridge.
- Type: Rifle
- Place of origin: Canada

Service history
- In service: Canada

Production history
- Designer: F.W. Jones
- Designed: 1906
- Manufacturer: Ross Rifle Company
- Variants: 280 Flanged (280 Lancaster)

Specifications
- Case type: Semi-rimmed, bottleneck
- Bullet diameter: .287 in (7.3 mm)
- Neck diameter: .317 in (8.1 mm)
- Shoulder diameter: .404 in (10.3 mm)
- Base diameter: .534 in (13.6 mm)
- Rim diameter: .556 in (14.1 mm)
- Case length: 2.59 in (66 mm)
- Overall length: 3.50 in (89 mm)
- Case capacity: 76 gr H_{2}O (4.9 cm^{3})
- Primer type: Berdan #59
- Maximum pressure: 47,200 psi (325 MPa)

Ballistic performance
Bullet mass/type	Velocity	Energy
140 gr (9 g) SP	2,900 ft/s (880 m/s)	2,620 ft⋅lbf (3,550 J)
150 gr (10 g) SP	2,800 ft/s (850 m/s)	2,610 ft⋅lbf (3,540 J)
160 gr (10 g) SP	2,700 ft/s (820 m/s)	2,600 ft⋅lbf (3,500 J)
180 gr (12 g) SP	2,550 ft/s (780 m/s)	2,600 ft⋅lbf (3,500 J)
- Source: "Cartridges of the World"

The .280 Ross, also known as the .280 Nitro, .280 Rimless Nitro Express Ross (CIP) and .280 Rimless cartridge, is an approximately 7mm bullet diameter rifle round developed in Canada by F.W. Jones as a consultant to Sir Charles Ross, 9th Baronet, and his Ross Rifle Company of Quebec, Canada for use as a Canadian military cartridge as a replacement for the .303 British, and in a civilianised and sporterised version of his controversial Mark II and Mk III Ross rifle, and first commercially produced by Eley Brothers of London, England, in late 1907.

== History ==
The .280 Ross was the first practical cartridge to reach the edge of 3,000 ft/s (914 m/s) muzzle velocity. Sir Charles Ross did many attempts while in the process of creating the "perfect cartridge", one of them leading to the creation of the .28-1906 in November 1906.

Ross also tried to convince the British War Department to adopt the .280 Ross (and his rifle) as the new service cartridge, but World War I came along and dashed his hopes.

The .280 also paved the way for Sir Charles' newly designed bullets, such as "Full Metal Patch" and "Metal Covered Hollow Point". The Ross Mk III rifle was especially developed to handle the .280. The .280 (and the Ross Rifle) won the famous Bisley international matches in 1908, 1912 and 1913 (King's Prize) plus many other prizes in different competitions on both sides of the Atlantic.

== Performance ==
Firing a 140-grain (9.1 g) bullet at a muzzle velocity of 2,900 ft/s (884 m/s), the new cartridge qualified for the contemporary designation "magnum". It was used as a military sniper's cartridge, in addition to achieving some celebrity as an African plains game cartridge in the years immediately following the First World War. However the large capacity case was capable of moving the bullets available at that time faster than would be desirable for reliable expansion, causing them to fragment rather than penetrate properly. Commercially, the .280 Ross was popular for stalkers in the United Kingdom and other Commonwealth countries like New Zealand and Canada, chambered in sporting versions of the Ross rifle. It was found to be an excellent cartridge on red deer with a terminal performance comparable to the modern .270 Winchester or .280 Remington. Compared to other cartridges of the period such as the 6.5×54mm Mannlicher, 7x57 Mauser and the .303 British, all with the slower loadings of the time, it was notably superior. Ballistically, the .280 Ross cartridge's performance was broadly comparable to that of the more modern .280 Remington / 7 mm Express Remington and 7×64mm. It works well on all North American game when used with an appropriate bullet. Once the Ross rifle company went out of business after WW1, the cartridge was orphaned as no one else chambered rifles for it. As a commercially manufactured item this cartridge has been obsolete for some years, because of the inappropriate bullets often used in it originally, as well as problems associated with the Ross rifle that it was normally chambered in. Handloaders continue to load successfully for it, by removing the belt from 7mm Remington Magnum or .300 Holland & Holland before resizing or by using swaged and necked-down .300 Remington Ultra Magnum cases. Proper head stamped brass is also available from Roberson Cartridge Company. Hawk 160 grain 286 diameter bullets are specifically made for the 280 ross. 275 h&h 287 diameter bullets of 160 and 175 grain from Woodliegh Bullets should also work. The German round .280 Halger Magnum is based on the .280 Ross case. Load references can be found in the September/October 1973 issue of the Handloader Magazine. As of 2020 correct size bullets are available from Woodleigh in Australia and Kynamco (Kynoch) from the United Kingdom.

== See also ==
- .275 H&H Magnum
- .276 Enfield
- .280 Flanged
- 7 mm caliber
- List of rifle cartridges
