= .275 H&H Magnum =

Rifle cartridge

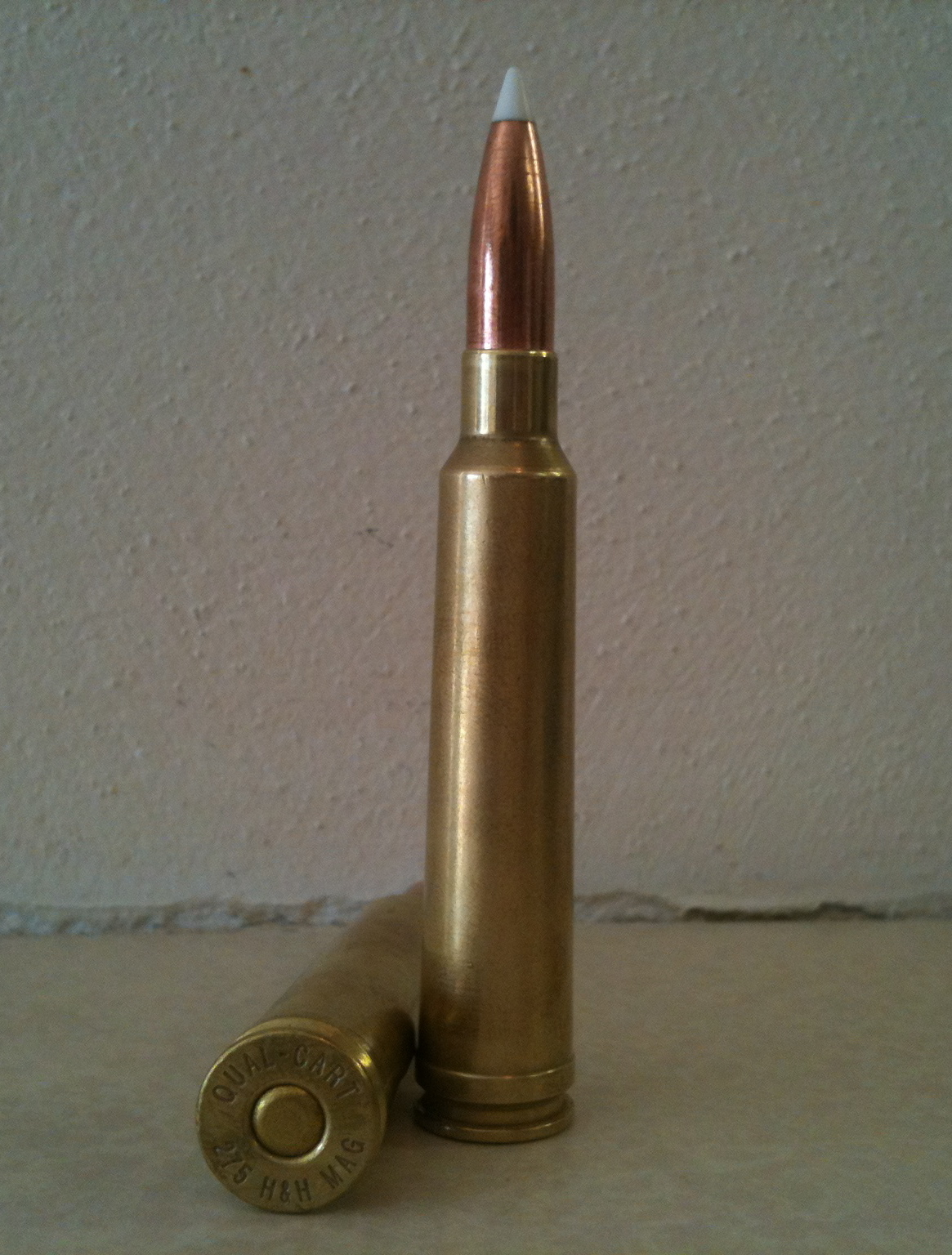
- .275 H&H Magnum cartridges
- Type: Rifle
- Place of origin: United Kingdom

Production history
- Designer: Holland & Holland
- Designed: 1912
- Produced: 1912–1939

Specifications
- Case type: Belted, bottleneck
- Bullet diameter: .287 (7.29 mm) (as per orig. H&H spec.)
- Neck diameter: .325 in (8.3 mm)
- Base diameter: .513 in (13.0 mm)
- Rim diameter: .532 in (13.5 mm)
- Rim thickness: .220 in (5.6 mm)
- Case length: 2.5 in (64 mm)
- Overall length: 3.42 in (87 mm)
- Primer type: Large Rifle Magnum

Ballistic performance
Bullet mass/type	Velocity	Energy
140 gr (9 g)	3,000 ft/s (910 m/s)	2,150 ft⋅lbf (2,920 J)
160 gr (10 g)	2,700 ft/s (820 m/s)	2,600 ft⋅lbf (3,500 J)
175 gr (11 g)	2,680 ft/s (820 m/s)	2,810 ft⋅lbf (3,810 J)

The .275 Holland & Holland Magnum is a semi-obsolete rifle cartridge similar to the 7mm Remington Magnum. Essentially the .275 Holland & Holland Magnum is a necked down shortened variant of the .375 Holland & Holland Magnum. It was introduced by the British company Holland & Holland with the .375 Holland & Holland Magnum that was introduced in 1912 as the .375 Belted Rimless Nitro-Express. The .375 Holland & Holland Magnum was intended for dangerous African game animals, while the .275 Holland & Holland Magnum was intended for longer range shooting of antelope in Africa and Red Stag in the highlands of Scotland.

== History ==
Aside from the belted case, the .275 H&H was very similar to the .276 Enfield cartridge of the Pattern 1913 Enfield rifle then under development by the British military to replace the Lee–Enfield. Cordite loadings gave both cartridges a reputation for unpleasant muzzle flash and short barrel life. Western Cartridge Company offered United States loadings of the .275 H&H Magnum in 1925 with the .300 H&H and the .375 H&H. The .275 H&H was omitted when Winchester Repeating Arms Company started chambering their Winchester Model 70 rifle for the other two in 1937. The .275 H&H offered little ballistic advantage over the .270 Winchester with contemporary smokeless powders. U.S. ammunition production ceased during 1939.

== Subsequent developments ==
Following World War II, independent gunsmiths in the United States began exploring the ballistic possibilities of military surplus IMR 4831 powder salvaged from Oerlikon 20mm cannon cartridges and marketed by Hodgdon Powder Company. The long range ballistics of wildcat cartridges resulted in commercial availability of the 7mm Weatherby Magnum in 1945, the 7×61mm Sharpe & Hart in 1953, and the 7mm Remington Magnum in 1962.

Holland & Holland continue to supply factory loaded .275 ammunition and the cartridge is occasionally chambered in custom made "classic" rifles. With modern powders, the 275 H&H can be handloaded to approximate many currently available 7mm Magnum chamberings. Correctly headstamped empty brass cases are made by Quality Cartridge Co. USA. The cartridge was loaded in two different versions rimless, and flanged, for double rifles and single shots. The flanged version was loaded to a lower pressure and velocity. (2650 fps with a 140 grain bullet).

== See also ==
- List of rifle cartridges
