= Pattern 1913 Enfield =

British service rifle

Rifle, Pattern 1913
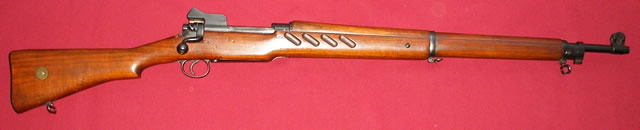
- Pattern 1913 Enfield experimental rifle
- Type: Bolt-action rifle
- Place of origin: United Kingdom

Service history
- Used by: United Kingdom

Production history
- Designed: 1912
- Produced: 1912–1914
- No. built: 1,257
- Variants: Pattern 1914, Model of 1917(US)

Specifications
- Mass: 8 lb 11 oz (3.94 kg) (Empty)
- Length: 3 ft 10.3 in (1,176 mm)
- Barrel length: 26 in (660 mm)
- Cartridge: .276 Enfield
- Caliber: .276 inch (7.0 mm)
- Action: Modified Mauser bolt action
- Rate of fire: Manual, as determined by skill of operator
- Muzzle velocity: 2,785 ft/s (849 m/s)
- Feed system: 5-round internal magazine with charger clip loading

The Pattern 1913 Enfield (P13) was an experimental rifle developed by the Royal Small Arms Factory for the British Army as a result of its combat experience in the Second Boer War from 1899 to 1902. The weapon was to serve as a replacement for the Short Magazine Lee–Enfield (SMLE). An advanced chamber design allowed for a high-velocity .276 Enfield rimless round, which was more powerful than the service-issued .303 British cartridge. Introduction of the P13 was rendered impractical by the outbreak of the First World War.

== History ==
During the Second Boer War, the British Army had been faced with expert Boer marksmen equipped with the Mauser Model 1895, in 7×57mm caliber. The Boers were able to fire at long range, sometimes as far as 2,000 yards, with the flat-shooting cartridge. This experience prompted the War Office to develop its own "magnum" round in 1910, using a .276-calibre rimless cartridge. In August 1910, the Small Arms Committee, which had been responsible for the adoption of the Short Magazine Lee–Enfield, was asked by the Director of Artillery to produce a new specification for a service rifle. The main changes called for a Mauser-style action and a one-piece stock (a cheaper and more serviceable option). In response, Birmingham Small Arms (BSA) submitted a design chambered for a rimless high-velocity cartridge. In 1911, the Royal Small Arms Factory (RSAF) at Enfield, the British Government's design and production facility, produced a modified Mauser-pattern rifle for a similar cartridge, the .276. This rifle was presented to the Small Arms Committee on 3 April 1911 by the Assistant Superintendent Carnegie, and the Chief Designer Reavill.

.276 Enfield (7×60mm) rimless bottlenecked rifle cartridge for which the Pattern 1913 Enfield action was designed.

Initially Enfield experimented with calibers ranging from .25 to .28. The Pattern 1911 variant included two calibres; the .276 and the .256. The .256 was found to be inaccurate and the .276 was adopted in mid-1911 for further testing. Problems with pressure and jacket fouling in the bore resulting from the high velocity round led to the cartridge being redesigned. Numerous changes to the rifle and the cartridge led to eleven Pattern 1911 and Pattern 1912 rifles being manufactured. At the end of 1912, it was decided to put the latest incarnation of the design into limited production for troop trials in 1913 and 1,000 were ordered from RSAF. By the end of 1912, 508 rifles had been completed, and by the end of January 1913, 1,251 had been manufactured. The rifle was distributed to the army as the Rifle, Magazine, Enfield, .276-inch. The trials took place in Britain, Ireland, Egypt and South Africa, by battalions out of Suffolk and Munster, as well as the 5th Dragoon Guards. Upon the completion of field trials, the Chief Inspector of Small Arms recommended a number of changes, which resulted in a quantity of 6 improved Pattern 1913 rifles being manufactured between March and April 1914. The outbreak of World War I led to the abandonment of the effort to introduce a smaller calibre rimless cartridge for purely practical reasons. Adapting the design (with largely cosmetic alterations aside from chamber and extractor redesign) to fire the standard .303 British round led to the Pattern 14 Rifle (P14), which was fed from a five-round internal magazine by five-round stripper clips. Effective mass production in Britain during World War I was impossible, and many Pattern 1914s were produced in the United States. Due to the outbreak of war and logistical demands, the SMLE remained the standard British rifle during World War I and the Pattern 1914 never fully replaced the Lee Enfield. It was redesigned for US service to use the .30-06 Springfield cartridge as the M1917 Enfield rifle following the US entry into that war in 1917.

== Design ==
The Pattern 1913 Enfield was influenced by the Mauser line of bolt-action rifles. Engineering concepts found in the German Gewehr 98 and American M1903 Springfield service rifles were combined with design features of the British Short Magazine Lee–Enfield Mk III service rifle. This rifle was about 5 inches shorter than its first design. The design of the Pattern 1913 Enfield showed the emphasis on accurate, rapid fire emphasized by British Army training during this period. The adjustable flip-up aperture rear sight with a 300 yd (274 m) battle setting when folded down allowing rapid and accurate sight acquisition. The Mauser-type bolt had a low-profile bolt handle with an integral safety lug built into its base that locked in the receiver. It also had a large gas shield to protect the shooters eyes in case a cartridge were to rupture.

The unusual 'dog-leg' shaped bolt handle has a low profile and places the bolt knob just rearwards of the trigger close to the firer's hand,facilitating rapid cycling and fire. Like the Lee–Enfield, the safety falls under the firer's thumb and can be operated silently. The action was configured to be easily operable, even when heated by sustained rapid fire, with slick operation, cock-on-closing feature and positive camming action when opening or closing the bolt. The Pattern 1913 Enfield bolt locking lugs had a 4 degree helical angle with matching angles on the receiver lug seats, which is also called interrupted threading. This means that final head space is not achieved until the bolt handle is turned down all the way.

The Lee–Enfield rifle also featured helical locking surfaces. Helical locking is a momentum locking characteristic when a screw is inserted. This creates a friction fit when a screw is inserted so that the screw does not back out to any force on the gun or vibrations from the rifle being fired. The British probably used helical locking lugs to allow for chambering imperfect or dirty ammunition and that the closing cam action is distributed over the entire mating faces of both bolt and receiver lugs. This is one reason the bolt closure feels smooth. The angled lugs had no tendency to unwind with chamber pressure since the "angle of repose" of smooth, lubricated steel surfaces is approximately 8 degrees. One advantage was that when the bolt handle was turned up was that the lugs cleared each other immediately so full effort was applied to the extraction cam. The trigger had a mechanical interlock to prevent firing unless the bolt was fully locked. The nickel-steel action was large and strong and had a long bolt throw compared to other military service rifle bolt actions, since it had to be capable of handling the dimensionally large .276 Enfield cartridge variants, and the barrel was given a heavy profile.

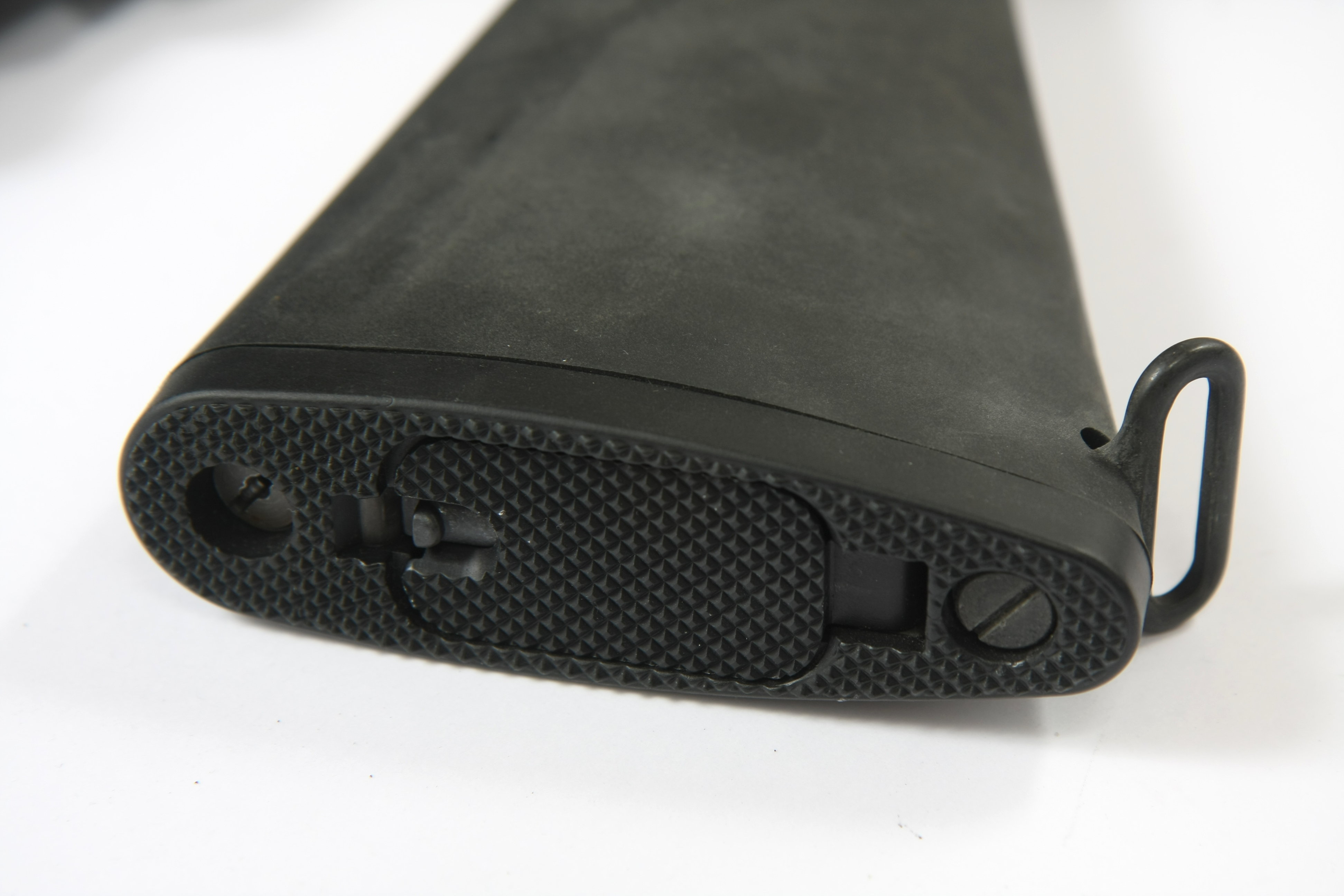
This picture is an example of a bottom-hinged trap. This is a picture of an AR-15 butt plate with a bottom-hinged trap.

The entire wooden stock of the rifle was all one piece and the metal butt plate had a bottom-hinged trap. These traps were used to store various cleaning items for the rifle. This was seen in Pattern '14 and '17 rifle productions but traps on the Short Magazine Lee-Enfield rifles were all top-hinged.

The Pattern 1913 Enfield had no magazine cut-off mechanism, which when engaged permits the feeding and extraction of single cartridges only while keeping the cartridges in the magazine in reserve. It was a long and comparatively heavy rifle compared to the Lee-Enfield Mk III which weighed 8 lb 10 oz (3.91 kg) empty.

The Pattern 1913 Enfield is distinguished by unusual angled finger grooves on the fore end of the stock, which were not present on the later P14 and M1917. Few examples exist on the collector's market due to the small-scale production. Some Pattern 1913s were later converted to target rifles in the UK.

== See also ==
- Pattern 1914 Enfield
- M1917 Enfield rifle
