= Pattern 1914 Enfield =

British service rifle

Rifle, .303 Pattern 1914
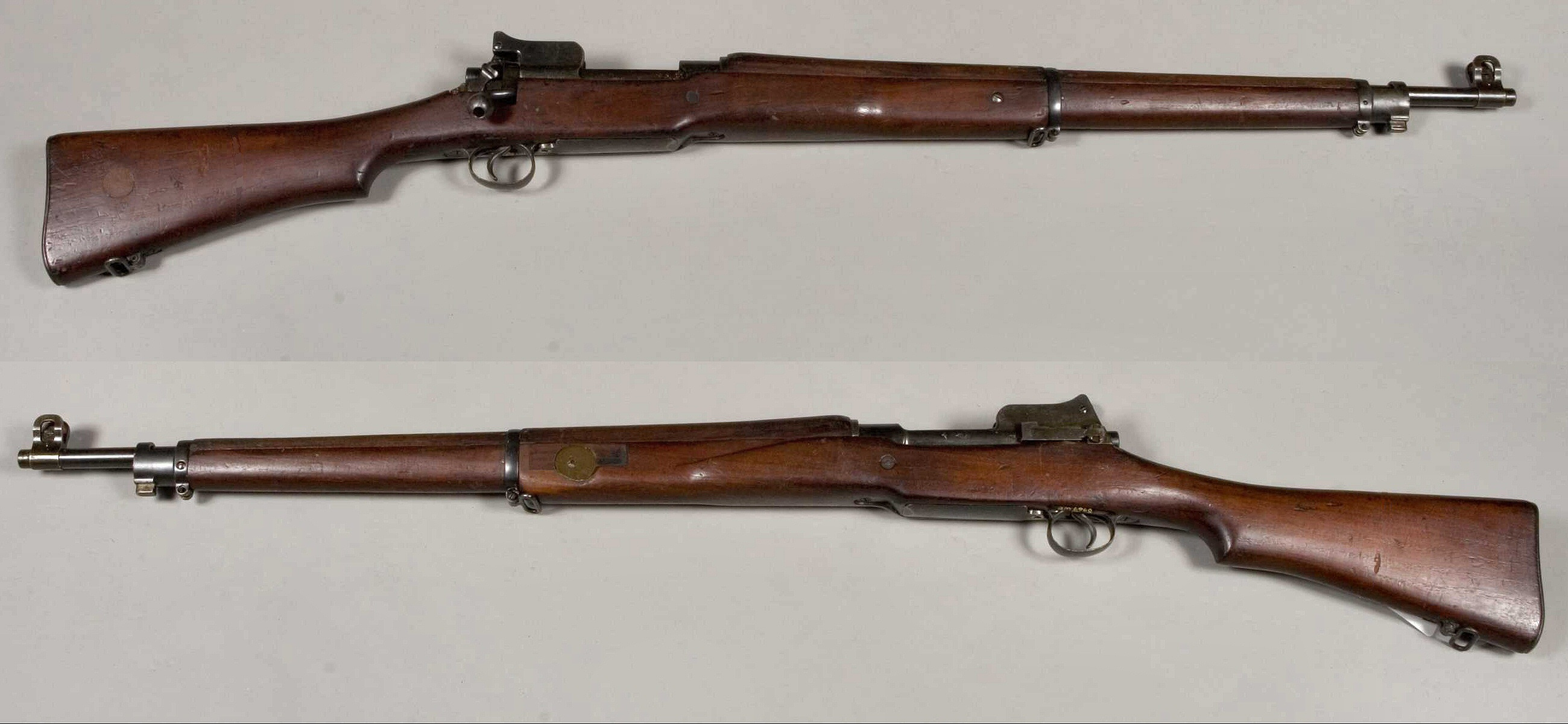
- Pattern 1914 Enfield
- Type: Service rifle Bolt-action rifle Sniper rifle
- Place of origin: United Kingdom

Service history
- In service: 1916–1945 (UK)
- Used by: World War I; Estonian War of Independence; Spanish Civil War; World War II; Korean War; Annexation of Goa; Portuguese Colonial War; 1958 Lebanon crisis; Lebanese Civil War; Soviet–Afghan War

Production history
- Designed: 1914–1915
- Produced: 1915–1917
- No. built: 1,235,298 total
- Variants: Sniper (telescopic and unmagnified), grenade launcher, US M1917 rifle

Specifications
- Mass: 9 lb 6 oz (4.25 kg) unloaded
- Length: 46.25 in (1,175 mm)
- Barrel length: 26 in (660 mm)
- Cartridge: .303 British
- Calibre: .303 in (7.7 mm)
- Action: Modified Mauser turn bolt-action
- Rate of fire: Manual, as determined by skill of operator
- Muzzle velocity: 2,380 ft/s (725 m/s)
- Effective firing range: 800 yd (732 m)
- Feed system: 5-round, stripper clip reloading

The Rifle, .303 Pattern 1914 (or P14) was a British service rifle of the First World War period, principally manufactured under contract by companies in the United States. It was a bolt-action weapon with an integral 5-round magazine. It served as a sniper rifle and as second-line and reserve issue, until declared obsolete in 1947. The Pattern 1914 Enfield was the successor to the Pattern 1913 Enfield experimental rifle and the predecessor of the U.S. Rifle M1917 Enfield.

== History ==
.276 Enfield (7×60mm) rimless bottlenecked rifle cartridge for which the action was originally designed

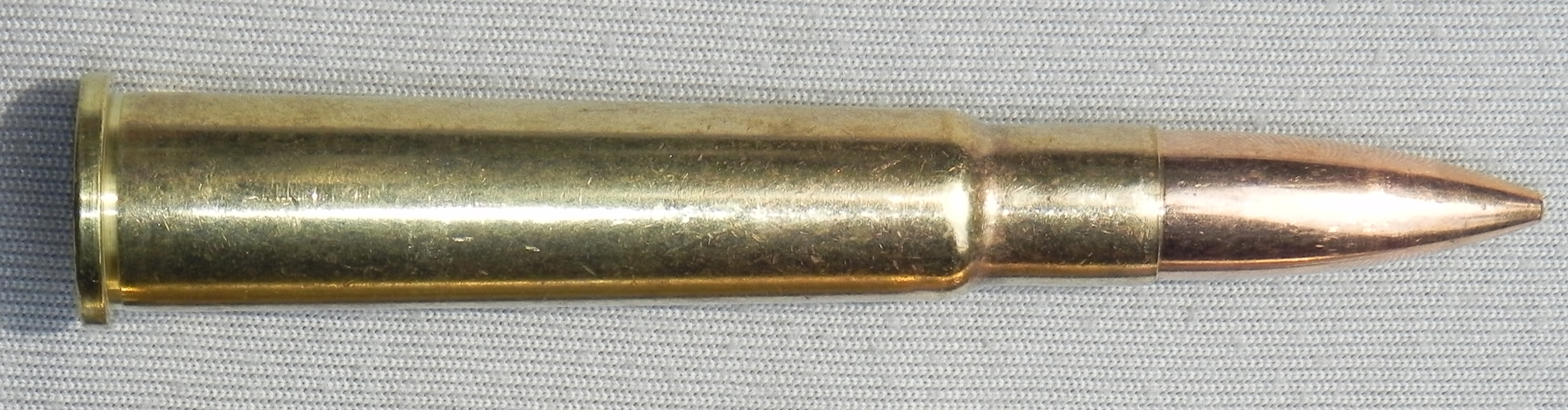
.303 British (7.7×56mmR) rimmed cartridge for which the P14 action was adapted

During the Second Boer War, the British were faced with accurate long-range fire from Mauser rifles, model 1893 and 1895, in 7×57mm calibre. This smaller, high-velocity round prompted the War Office to develop their own "magnum" round, the .276 Enfield, in 1910. An advanced new rifle using a modified Mauser M98-pattern action was built to fire it, the Pattern 1913 Enfield (P13); effective mass production was still not in effect when World War I started, due to the logistical issues that introducing a new rifle cartridge in wartime would cause, so nothing came of it.

== Production history ==
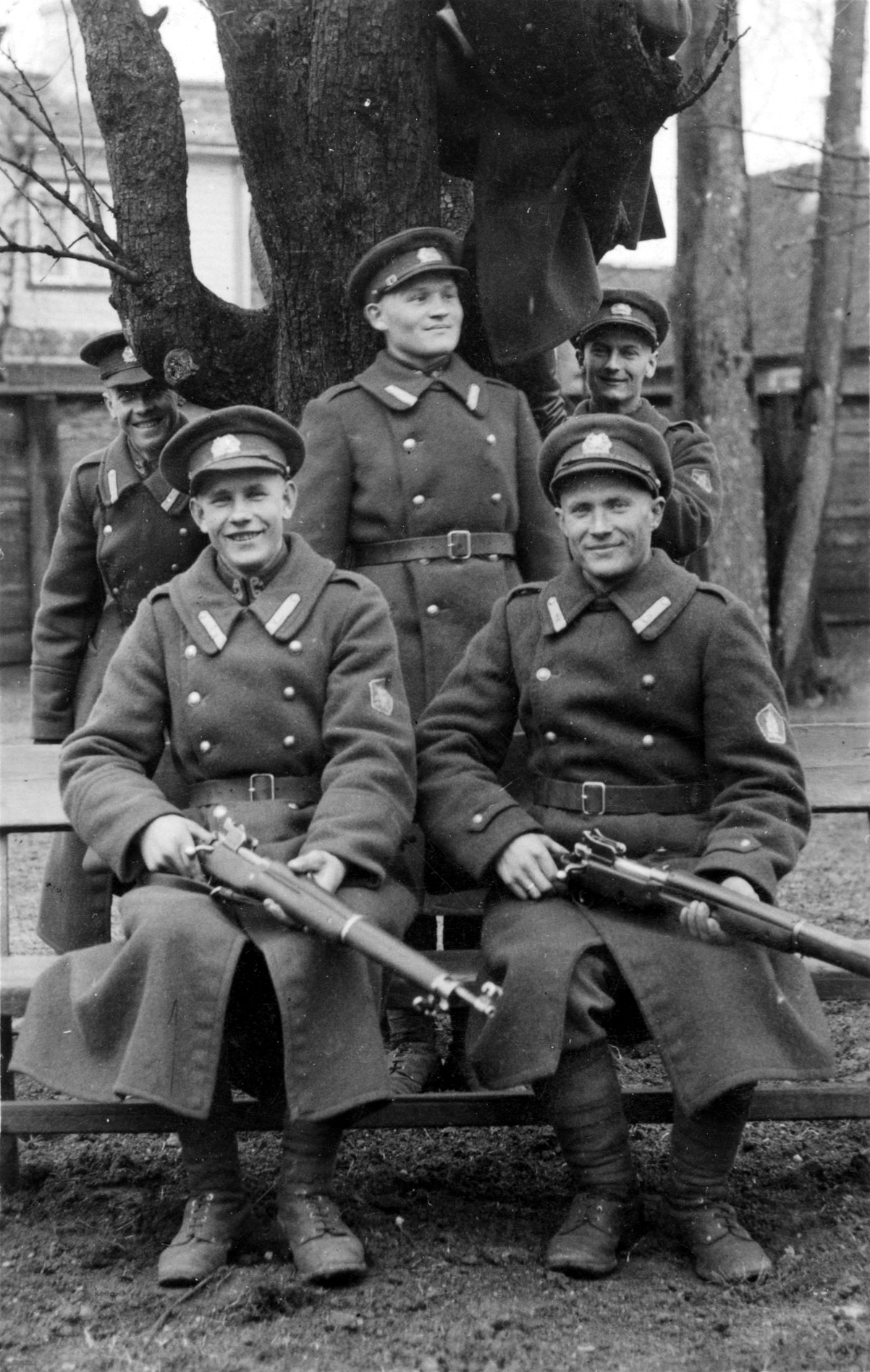
Conscripts of the Estonian Sakala Partisan Battalion with P14 rifles in 1939 or 1940

The primary contractor (Vickers) was unable to produce more than a handful of rifles, so the P14 became a de facto afterthought. The Short Magazine Lee–Enfield therefore remained the standard British rifle during World War I and beyond.

The need for additional small arms combined with a shortage of spare industrial capacity led the British government to contract with United States commercial arms manufacturers, Winchester, Remington and Eddystone (a subsidiary of Remington set up principally to manufacture the P14) to produce the P14 for the British, which continued until the U.S. entered the war in 1917. However, each factory produced slightly differing parts, leading to interchangeability issues. Therefore, the official designation of the rifle was dependent upon its manufacturer: e.g., the Pattern 1914 Mk I W is a Mk I of Winchester manufacture, R would be Remington, or E for Eddystone. Problems were encountered with specifications, quality and shortage of machine tools and skilled workers, with the result that the first rifles were not accepted by British inspectors until February 1916. In December 1916, a modification was made to enlarge the bolt lugs and the rifle became the Mark I*. They were still designated by the letter of their manufacturer (W, R or E), although production had become more standardized. The Mk I were soon confined to training usage and marked DP, meaning Drill Purpose.

The P14's principal combat use during World War I was as a sniper rifle, since it was found to be more accurate than the Short Magazine Lee–Enfield, either in standard issue form or with modified "fine-adjustment" aperture rearsights designated Pattern 1914 Mk I W (F) and Pattern 1914 Mk I* W (F) or, from April 1918, Aldis Pattern 1918 telescopic sights designated Pattern 1914 Mk I* W (T) (modified and telescopic sights were mainly used on Winchester-manufactured rifles, the Winchesters being thought to be of superior quality). Eventually Winchester manufactured 235,293 rifles, Remington manufactured 400,000 and Eddystone manufactured 600,000, totaling 1,235,293 rifles.

When the U.S. entered World War I, the P14 was modified and standardized by the Ordnance Department and went into production at the same factories as had produced the P14, production of that rifle having ceased, as the Model of 1917. Sometimes called the M1917 Enfield, it was chambered for the standard U.S. .30-06 Springfield cartridge and enjoyed some success as a complement to the Springfield M1903 rifles which were America's official standard issue, soon far surpassing the Springfield in total production and breadth of issue.

In 1926, the Pattern 1914 Enfield was re-designated by the British military as the No.3 Mk I.

Prior to and during World War II, over 670,000 Pattern 1914 Enfields were used, after undergoing modification ("Weedon Repair Standard", formally the Mk II standard) in the UK, mainly as a rearguard rifle. The modification consisted of armourers at the Weedon Royal Ordnance Depot or various other commercial companies inspecting the rifles, removing the volley sights and performing any necessary repair prior to issue. Post Dunkirk and with the great loss of arms that the British forces endured in 1940, the stock of No3Mk1 suddenly became a valued resource. The rifle was also used again as a sniper rifle, the configuration being different from the World War I incarnation. Additionally, the U.S. sent some M1917 Enfield rifles to the UK under Lend-Lease, though the different .30-06 Springfield chambering limited use and necessitated clearly marking the rifles with a 2 inch wide red band around the stock. The Australian Army also used some quantities of the sniper variant of the P14 during World War II. Once sufficient numbers were built up of the Short Magazine Lee–Enfield and No.4 rifles, the No.3 Mk I were either relegated primarily to equip the World War II British Home Guard or used as sniper rifles. Some sniper rifles were used during the Korean War.

The P14/No.3 Mk I was declared obsolete in British service in 1947.

Surplus P14s were sold throughout the Commonwealth, especially Canada, New Zealand, Australia and South Africa, where they proved popular for full-bore target shooting, and being sporterised for game shooting.

== Design details ==
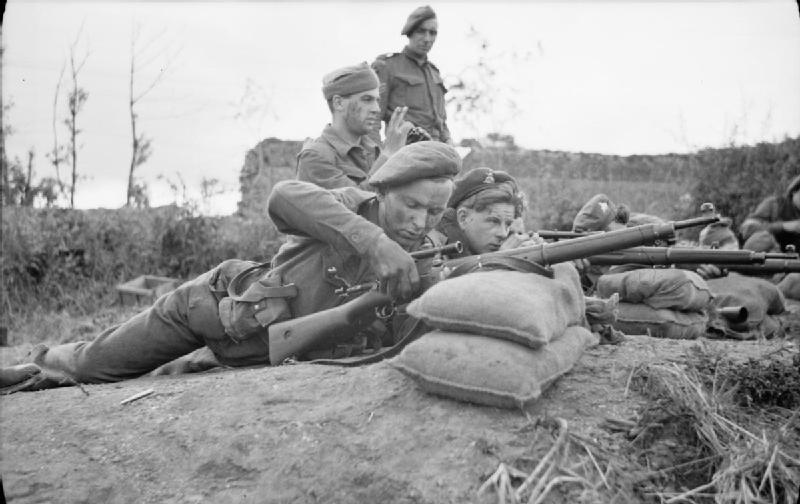
British sniper training in France 1944

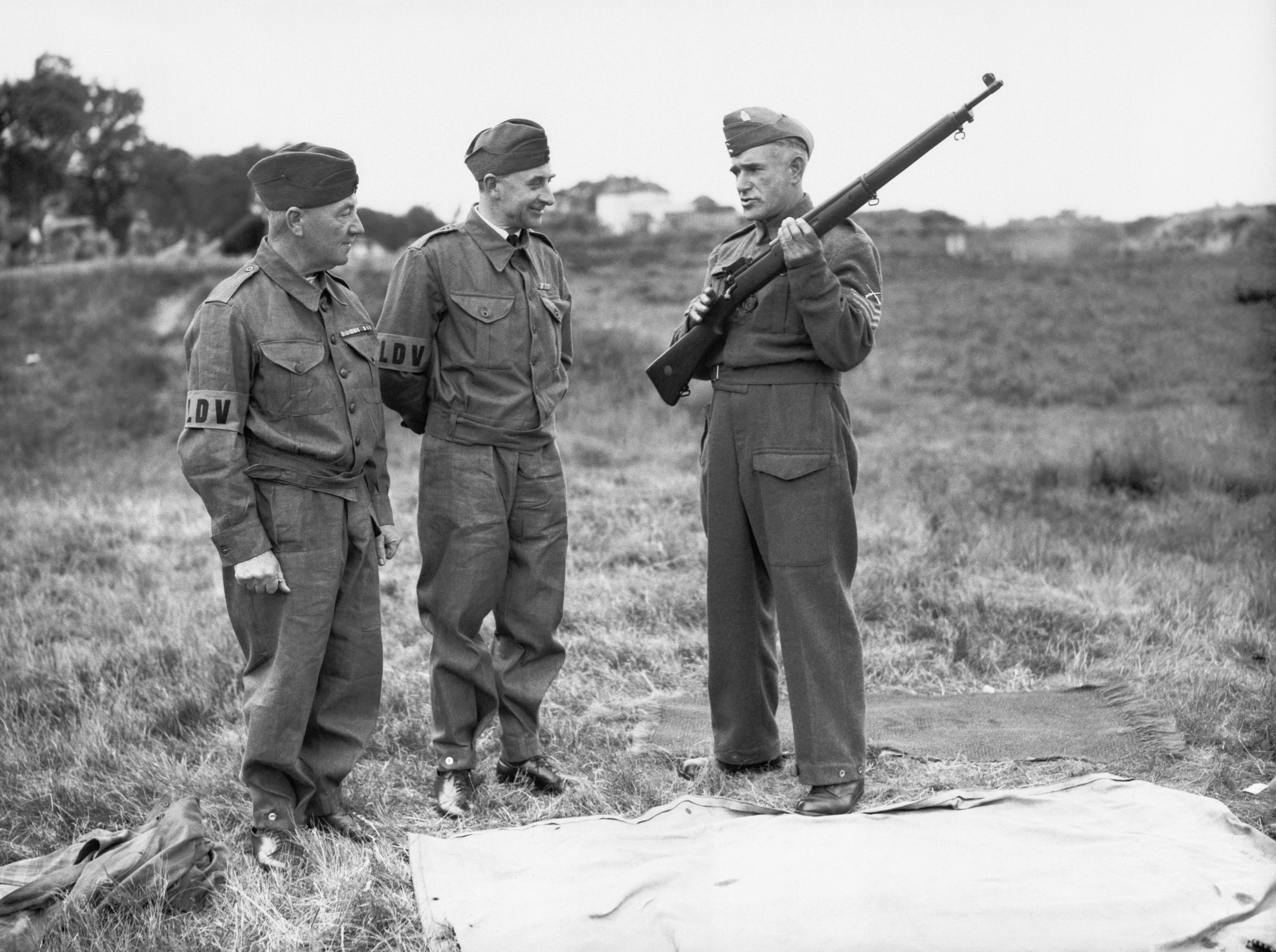
Home Guard volunteers were instructed on the working of a P14 rifle during World War 2.

Adapting the design to fire the standard .303 British round led to the Rifle, .303 Pattern 1914 (P14), a design fed from a five-round internal box magazine. With its prominent sight protection ears on the receiver, "dog-leg" bolt handle and "pot-belly" magazine, it was distinctive in appearance. The action was essentially a Mauser design with some Lee–Enfield features and optimised for rapid fire, with the action cocking on closing, a feature highly valued by the British Army with its emphasis on riflemen highly trained for rapid fire, but less valued in other armies, such as the U.S. or Germany, where cock-on-opening designs such as the M1903 Springfield and Gewehr 98 were preferred. Cock-on-opening actions became more difficult to operate when heated by rapid fire as the effort to open the bolt had to overcome the striker spring to cock the action as well as unsticking the fired case from the chamber. The P14 was an advanced design for the time, and was said to be the most advanced service rifle of World War I.

The Pattern 1914 Enfield had a large, strong bolt action made from nickel-steel, and the bolt travel is long, as it was designed for the dimensionally large and powerful .276 Enfield cartridge. The bolt action had a Model 98 Mauser type claw extractor and two forward lugs; there was also a rear safety lug formed by the base of the bolt handle sitting in a recess in the receiver. Much faster and smoother to operate than a Model 98 Mauser, the bolt was well-supported throughout its travel and the camming action on opening and closing the bolt facilitated ease and speed of operation. The unusual 'dog-leg' shaped bolt handle is low profile and places the bolt knob just rearwards of the trigger close to the firer's hand, again facilitating rapid cycling and fire. Like the Lee–Enfield, the safety falls under the firer's thumb and can be operated silently.

Due to the original Pattern 1913 Enfield action being designed around the high-powered .276 Enfield experimental cartridge with a larger diameter case than the .303 British, the internal box magazine capacity for the smaller diameter .303 British was six rounds, although the employed stripper clips held only five cartridges. The Pattern 1914 Enfield, as well as the Mauser Gewehr 98, did not have a magazine cut-off mechanism which when engaged permits the feeding and extraction of single cartridges only while keeping the cartridges in the magazine in reserve.

The rifle was designed with an iron sight line consisting of rear receiver aperture battle sight calibrated for .303 British Mk VII ball ammunition at 300 yd (274 m) with an additional ladder aperture sight that could be flipped up and was calibrated for 200–1,000 yd (183–914 m) in 100 yd (91 m) increments and 1,000–1,650 yd (914–1,509 m) in 50 yd (46 m) increments. The ladder aperture sight moves vertically on a slide, and hence was not able to correct for wind drift. The rear sight element was protected by sturdy "ears" and proved to be faster and more accurate than the typical mid-barrel sight offered by Mauser, Enfield or the Buffington battle sight of the 1903 Springfield. The front sighting element consisted of a wing guards protected front post, and was adjusted laterally and locked into position during assembly at the arsenal. The Pattern 1914 Enfield rear sight element was situated on an elongated receiver bridge, which added weight to the action, as well as lengthening the bolt. There were also volley-fire sights similar to those on the Short Magazine Lee–Enfield fitted to the left side of the weapon for use up to 2,600 yd (2,377 m), though these were of little use and were usually deleted when the weapon was refurbished.

The advanced aperture sights with their long sight radius contributed to a well-deserved reputation for accuracy, and WW1 snipers considered it to be more accurate than the standard Short Magazine Lee-Enfield Mk III infantry rifle.

Compared to the Lee–Enfield, the Pattern 1914 Enfield was more accurate and more durable. However, it was heavier – it weighed 8 lb 10 oz (3.91 kg) empty – and had only half the magazine capacity, giving it a significantly lower effective rate of fire. The pre-World War professional British Army emphasized marksmanship and rapid-fire training, resulting in the annual Mad minute qualification shoot for their riflemen. In contrast to the Boer War experience which had led to the P13/P14 project, World War I conditions favoured volume of fire, at which the Short Magazine Lee–Enfield excelled.

== Users ==
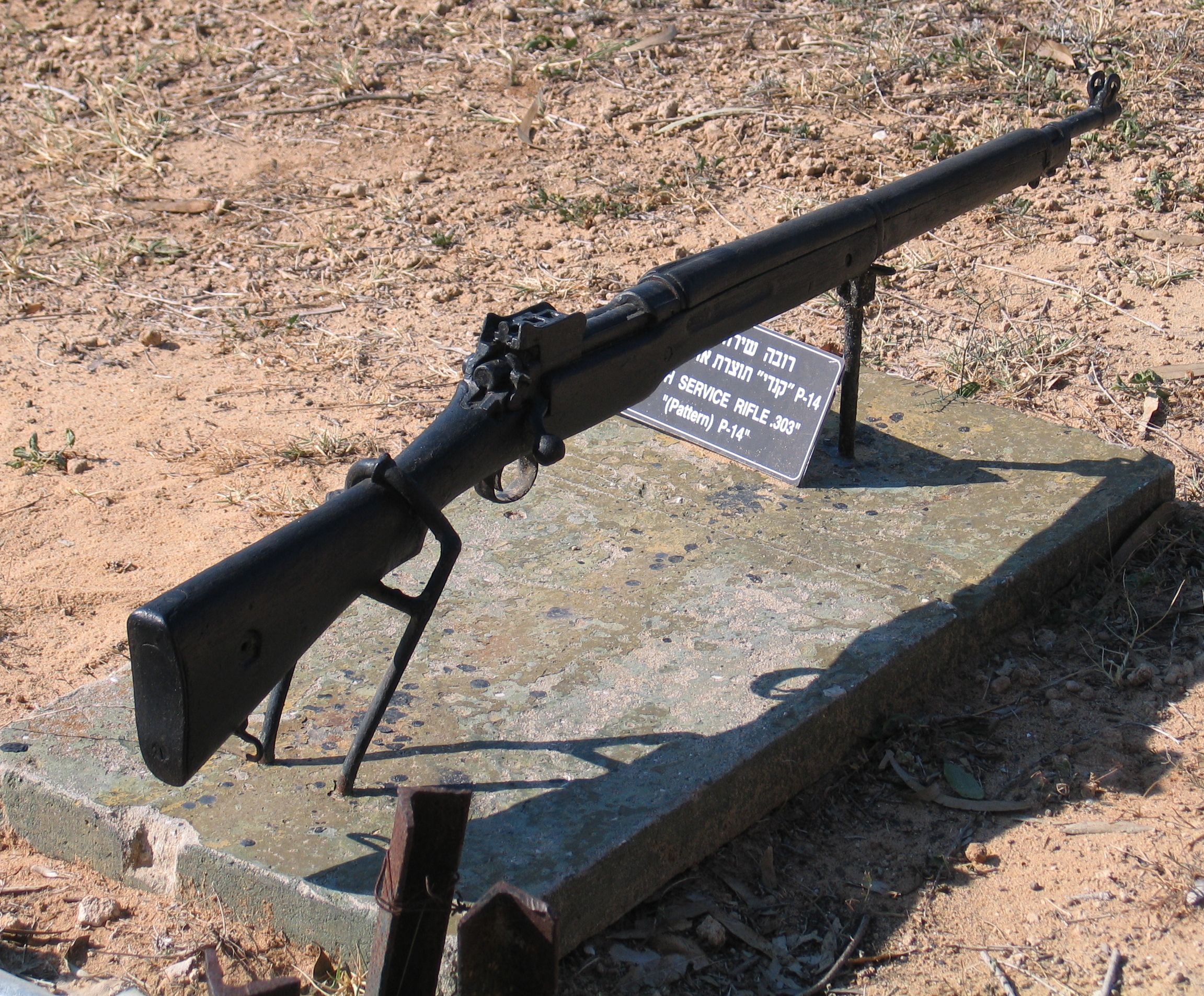
Israeli P14 Enfield at Yad Mordechai battlefield reconstruction site

- Afghanistan
- Australia
- British Empire
- Canada
- China: Zhang Zongchang acquired 6,000 ex-Latvian P14s and a variant chambered in 7.92×57mm Mauser was also produced for China
- Egypt
- Estonia
- Ethiopian Empire: acquired after World War I
- France: used by Free French Forces
- India
- Ireland
- Latvia: about 20,000 used 1918–1940 by Latvian Army infantry (both regular and sniper versions as šautenes 14. g.) and the Border Guard Brigade
- Lithuania: 47,650 bought from Italy
- Netherlands: used by units of the Royal Netherlands East Indies Army in Australia
- New Zealand
- Norway: Received from Allied airdrops to the resistance during WW2 and given by Britain to the Norwegian Brigade during the occupation of Germany in 1947. Returned to Britain in 1952 in exchange for P-17 rifles.
- Portugal
- Spanish Republic: 250 P14 rifles sourced from Estonia were received during the Spanish Civil War

== See also ==
- British military rifles
