= .250-3000 Savage =

Rifle cartridge

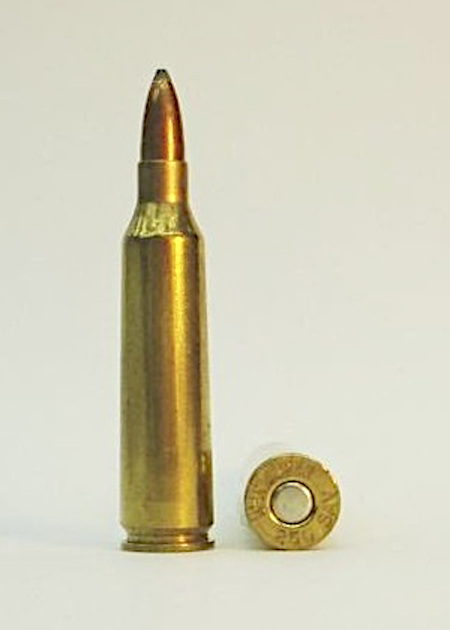
- Type: Rifle
- Place of origin: United States

Production history
- Designer: Charles Newton
- Designed: 1915
- Manufacturer: Savage Arms Company
- Variants: .250 Ackley

Specifications
- Parent case: .30-06 Springfield
- Case type: Rimless, bottleneck
- Bullet diameter: 6.553 mm (0.2580 in)
- Neck diameter: 7.254 mm (0.2856 in)
- Shoulder diameter: 10.251 mm (0.4036 in)
- Base diameter: 11.857 mm (0.4668 in)
- Rim diameter: 12.01 mm (0.473 in)
- Rim thickness: 1.24 mm (0.049 in)
- Case length: 48.56 mm (1.912 in)
- Overall length: 58.93–63.88 mm (2.320–2.515 in)
- Case capacity: 42.7 cm^{3} (659 gr H_{2}O)
- Rifling twist: Originally 14 in, later 10 in
- Primer type: Large rifle
- Maximum CUP: 45,000 CUP

Ballistic performance
Bullet mass/type	Velocity	Energy
75 gr (5 g) HP	3,170 ft/s (966 m/s)	1,674 ft⋅lbf (2,270 J)
90 gr (6 g) HPBT	2,997 ft/s (913 m/s)	1,795 ft⋅lbf (2,434 J)
100 gr (6 g) SP	2,864 ft/s (873 m/s)	1,822 ft⋅lbf (2,470 J)
117 gr (8 g) SBT	2,652 ft/s (808 m/s)	1,828 ft⋅lbf (2,478 J)
- Test barrel length: 24"; Source: Accurate Powder

The .250-3000 Savage / 6.5x48mm (also known as the .250 Savage) is a rifle cartridge created by Charles Newton in 1915. It was designed to be used in the Savage Model 99 hammerless lever action rifle. The name comes from its original manufacturer, Savage Arms, and the fact that the original load achieved a 3,000 ft/s (910 m/s) velocity with an 87 grain (5.6 g) bullet.

== Background ==
In 1915, Charles Newton designed the .250-3000 Savage case to fit the popular Savage Model 99 lever-action rifle, which unlike the previous lever actions had no problems with aerodynamic spitzer bullets thanks to its rotary magazine. To facilitate handloading, casing geometry was based on the .30-06 Springfield, albeit shortened in order to fit into the aforementioned magazine designed for the .303 Savage. Newton recommended loading 100 grain (6.5 g) bullets at 2,800 ft/s (850 m/s); but Savage Arms reduced bullet weight to obtain a velocity of 3,000 ft/s (910 m/s), making it the first American cartridge capable of that velocity. Achieving that velocity may have been the reason for the choice of the light-for-caliber 87-grain (5.6 g) bullet. Newton questioned if the publicity over the advantages of velocity compensated for reduced penetration of the lighter bullet in larger game animals.

The cartridge has a pressure limit of 45,000 CUP set by SAAMI. It lacks the power of the bigger .25-06 Remington but provides less noise and less recoil. Performance is very close to the .257 Roberts. It is arguably a better overall cartridge for hunting than the more popular .30-30, but in recent years has lost ground to the .257 Roberts and flatter-shooting 6mm cartridges such as the .243 Winchester.

Currently, there are very few new firearms being made in .250 Savage. It is an excellent cartridge with moderate recoil for hunting small up to deer-sized game.

== Variants ==
Some varmint hunters use the improved version of this cartridge, known as the .250 Ackley, .250 Improved or .250 Ackley Improved as a dual-purpose intermediate-range cartridge. The .250 Ackley is the same basic cartridge with a steeper shoulder and with the sides blown-out or straightened to increase powder space. This provides a velocity improvement of more than 250 ft/s (76.2 m/s) over standard factory loads.

== Official SAAMI Dimensional line Drawing 250 Savage ==
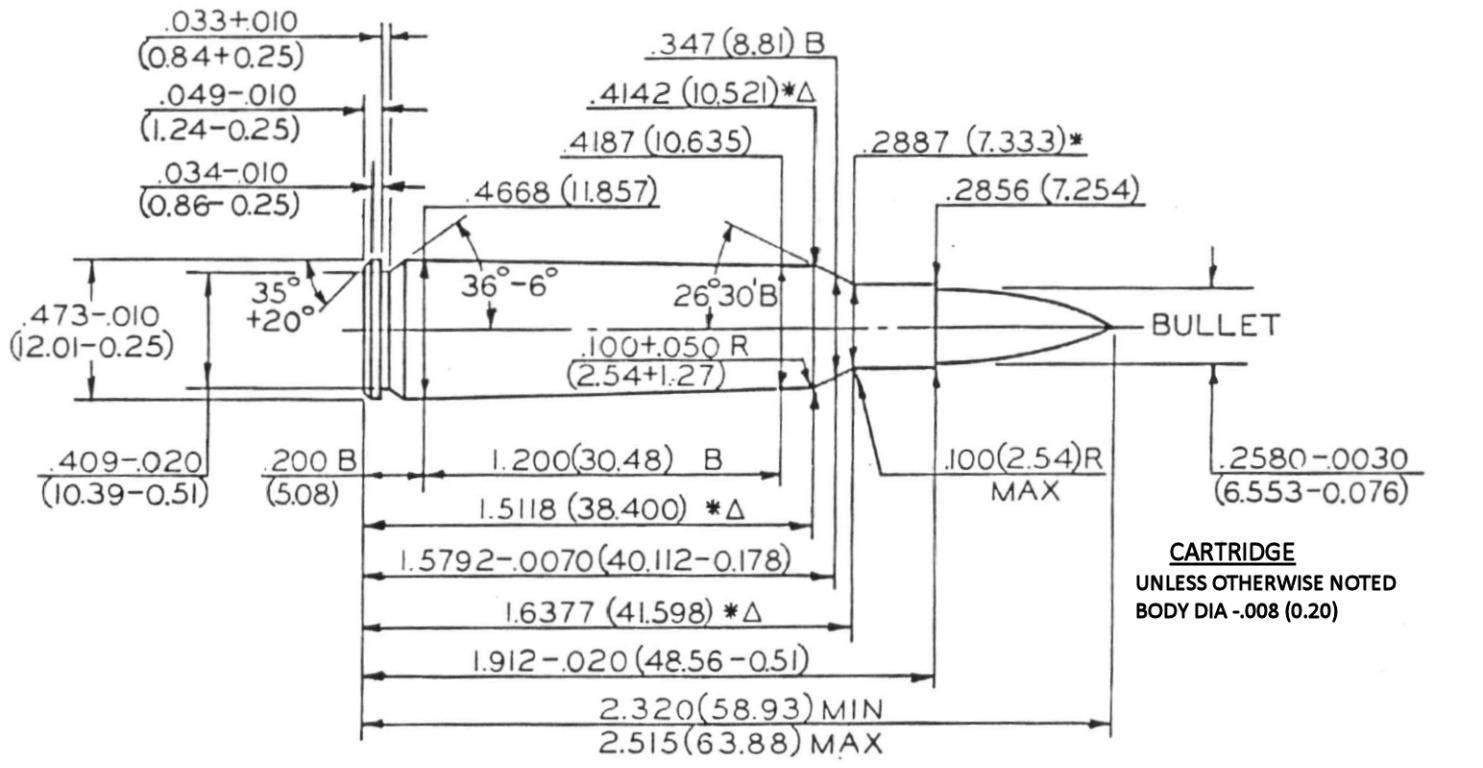
250 Savage Dimensions, designed by Charles Newton in 1915

== See also ==
- .300 Savage
- .303 Savage
- .308 Winchester
- .257 Roberts
- .25-06 Remington
- List of rifle cartridges
- Table of handgun and rifle cartridges
