= .300 Savage =

Rimless, .30 caliber rifle cartridge

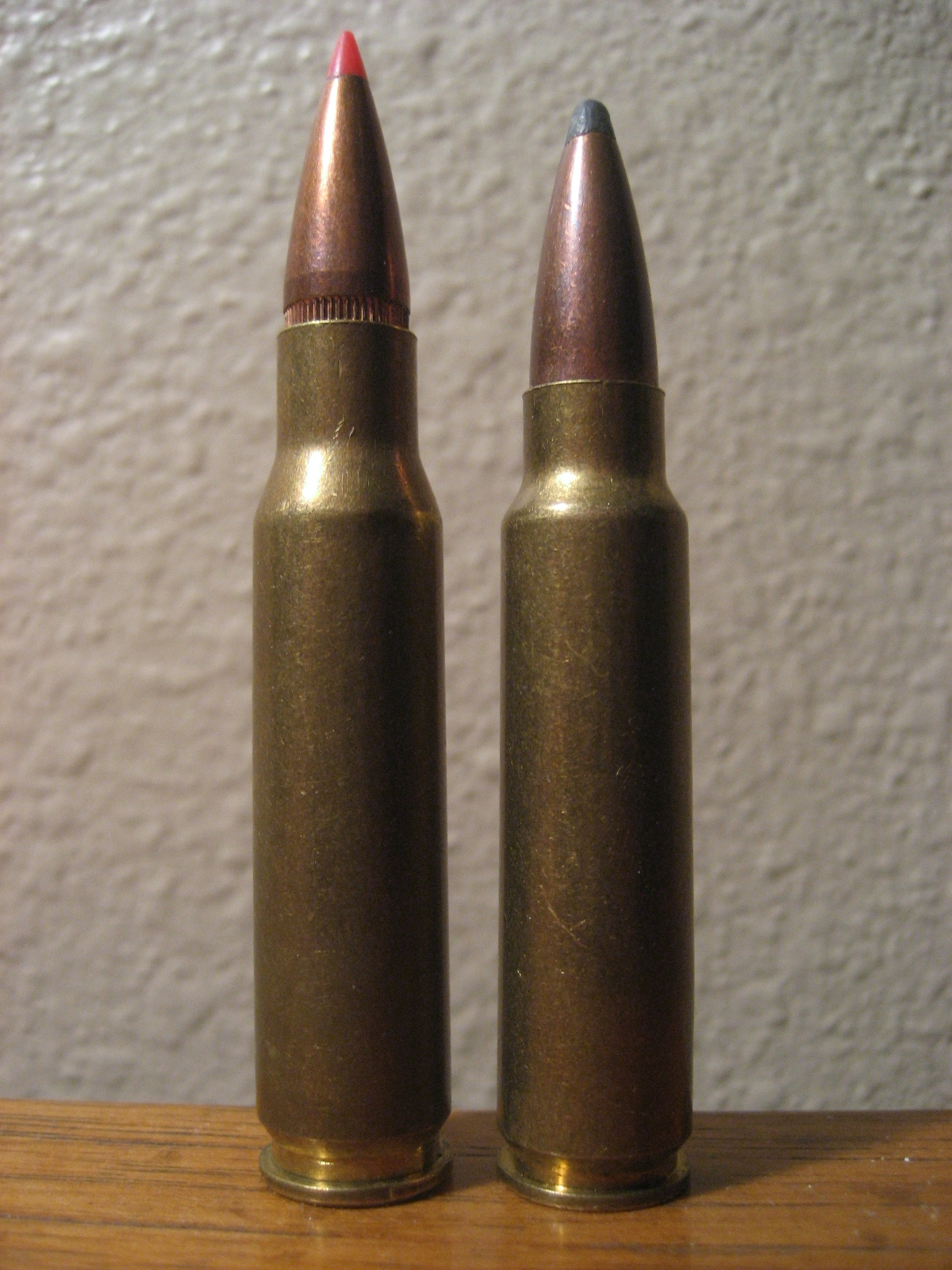
- A side-by-side size comparison between the .308 Winchester (left) and the .300 Savage (right)
- Type: Rifle
- Place of origin: United States

Production history
- Designer: Savage Arms
- Manufacturer: Savage Arms
- Produced: 1920–present

Specifications
- Parent case: .250 Savage
- Case type: Rimless, bottleneck
- Bullet diameter: .308 in (7.8 mm)
- Neck diameter: .339 in (8.6 mm)
- Shoulder diameter: .446 in (11.3 mm)
- Base diameter: .471 in (12.0 mm)
- Rim diameter: .473 in (12.0 mm)
- Case length: 1.871 in (47.5 mm)
- Overall length: 2.60 in (66 mm)
- Case capacity: 52.5 gr H_{2}O (3.40 cm^{3})
- Rifling twist: 1-10 in
- Primer type: Large rifle
- Maximum pressure (C.I.P.): 52,939 psi (365.00 MPa)
- Maximum pressure (SAAMI): 47,000 psi (320 MPa)
- Maximum CUP: 46,000 CUP

Ballistic performance
| Bullet mass/type | Velocity | Energy |
|---|---|---|
| 150 gr (10 g) Remington Core-Lokt soft point factory load | 2,630 ft/s (800 m/s) | 2,303 ft⋅lbf (3,122 J) |
| 150 gr (10 g) Hornady Superperformance SST factory load | 2,740 ft/s (840 m/s) | 2,500 ft⋅lbf (3,400 J) |
| 180 gr (12 g) Federal soft point factory load | 2,350 ft/s (720 m/s) | 2,207 ft⋅lbf (2,992 J) |
| 150 gr (10 g) FMJ hand load | 2,765 ft/s (843 m/s) | 2,547 ft⋅lbf (3,453 J) |
| 165 gr (11 g) PSPCL hand load | 2,676 ft/s (816 m/s) | 2,624 ft⋅lbf (3,558 J) |
- Test barrel length: 24; Sources: Midway USA (factory loads); Accurate Powder (hand loads)

The .300 Savage cartridge is a rimless, .30 caliber rifle cartridge developed by Savage Arms in 1920. It was designed to replace the less powerful .303 Savage in their popular Savage Model 1899 hammerless lever-action rifle, which they started to produce again as Model 99, as well as the new Savage Model 1920 bolt-action rifle. Despite having a short case in order to fit the original Model 99 magazine and a rather stumpy neck, the cartridge is capable of propelling a 150-grain (9.7 g) bullet at over 2,600 ft/s (790 m/s) with an effective range of over 300 yd (270 m).

After WW2, US Ordnance authorities working on the next phase of US Military small arms used the .300 Savage as the basis for experiments developing new ammunition, eventually leading to the 7.62×51mm NATO cartridge (see section "T65 series experimental cartridges").

== Performance ==
Pressure level for the .300 Savage is set by SAAMI at 46,000 CUP.

== Official SAAMI .300 Savage dimensional line drawing ==
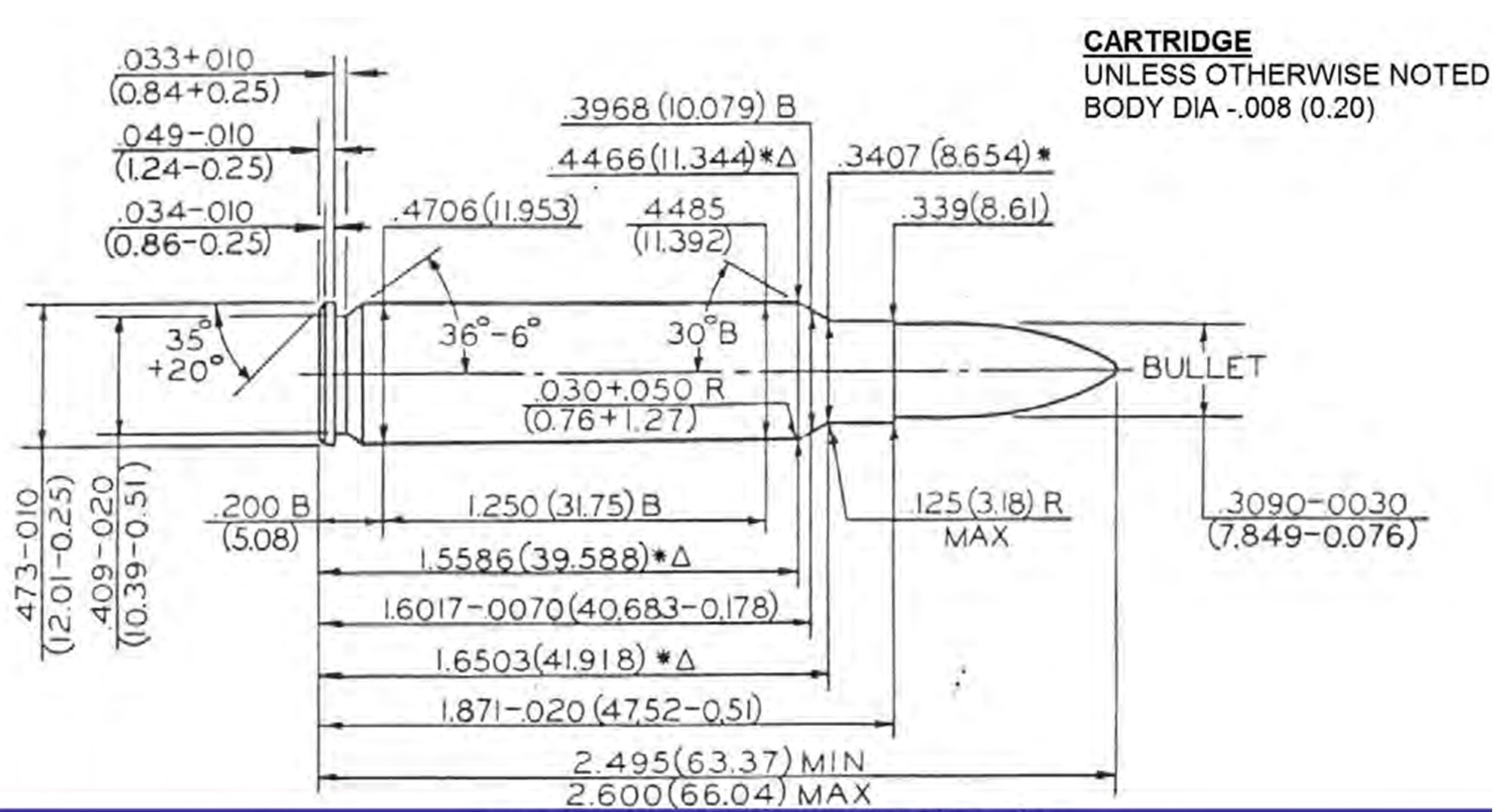

== See also ==
- .303 Savage
- .30-06 Springfield
- 7.62×51mm NATO
- .308 Winchester
- Table of handgun and rifle cartridges
