= .22 Savage Hi-Power =

Cartridge

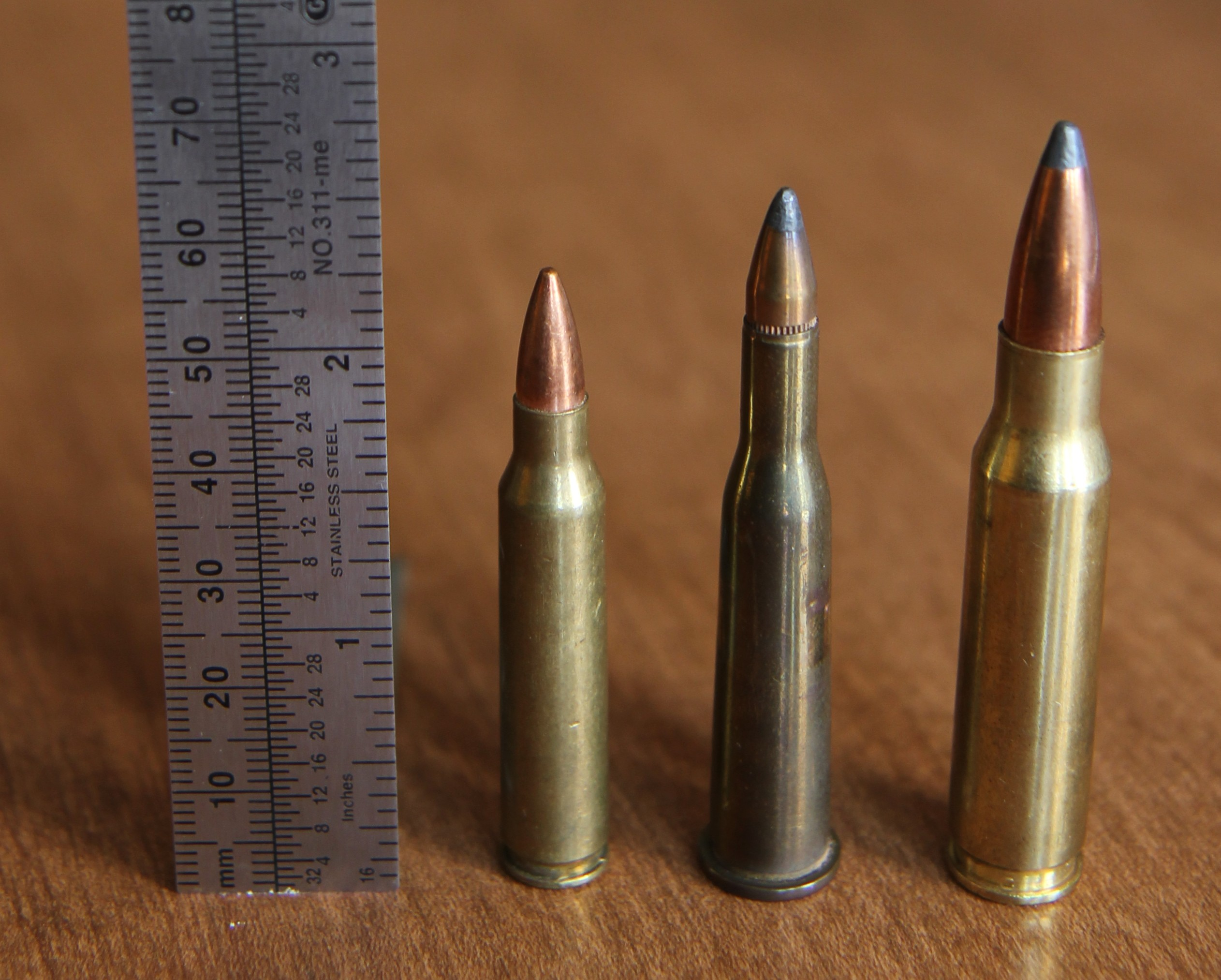
- .22 Savage Hi-Power (center) with .223 Rem (left) and .308 Win (right)
- Type: Rifle
- Place of origin: United States

Production history
- Designer: Charles Newton
- Manufacturer: Savage Arms; Norma (company); Sellier & Bellot; Wolf Ammunition
- Produced: 1912
- Variants: .22 Marciante Blue Streak

Specifications
- Parent case: .25-35 Winchester
- Case type: Bottleneck, Rimmed
- Bullet diameter: .228 in (5.8 mm)
- Neck diameter: .254 in (6.5 mm)
- Shoulder diameter: .362 in (9.2 mm)
- Base diameter: .423 in (10.7 mm)
- Rim diameter: .506 in (12.9 mm)
- Case length: 2.05 in (52 mm)
- Overall length: 2.51 in (64 mm)
- Rifling twist: 12
- Primer type: large rifle

Ballistic performance
| Bullet mass/type | Velocity | Energy |
|---|---|---|
| 70 gr (5 g) | 2,800 ft/s (850 m/s) | 1,493 ft⋅lbf (2,024 J) |
- Sources: Barnes, Frank C. "Cartridges of the World." Digest Books, Inc. 3rd Edition: 1972

The .22 Savage Hi-Power cartridge, also known as 5.6×52mmR, was created by Charles Newton and introduced by Savage Arms in 1912. It was designed to be used in the Savage Model 99 hammerless lever action rifle. It is based upon the .25-35 Winchester cartridge necked down to accept a .227 in/.228 in diameter bullet. Its original loading was a 70 grain soft point bullet with a velocity of about 2790 feet per second.

== History and description ==
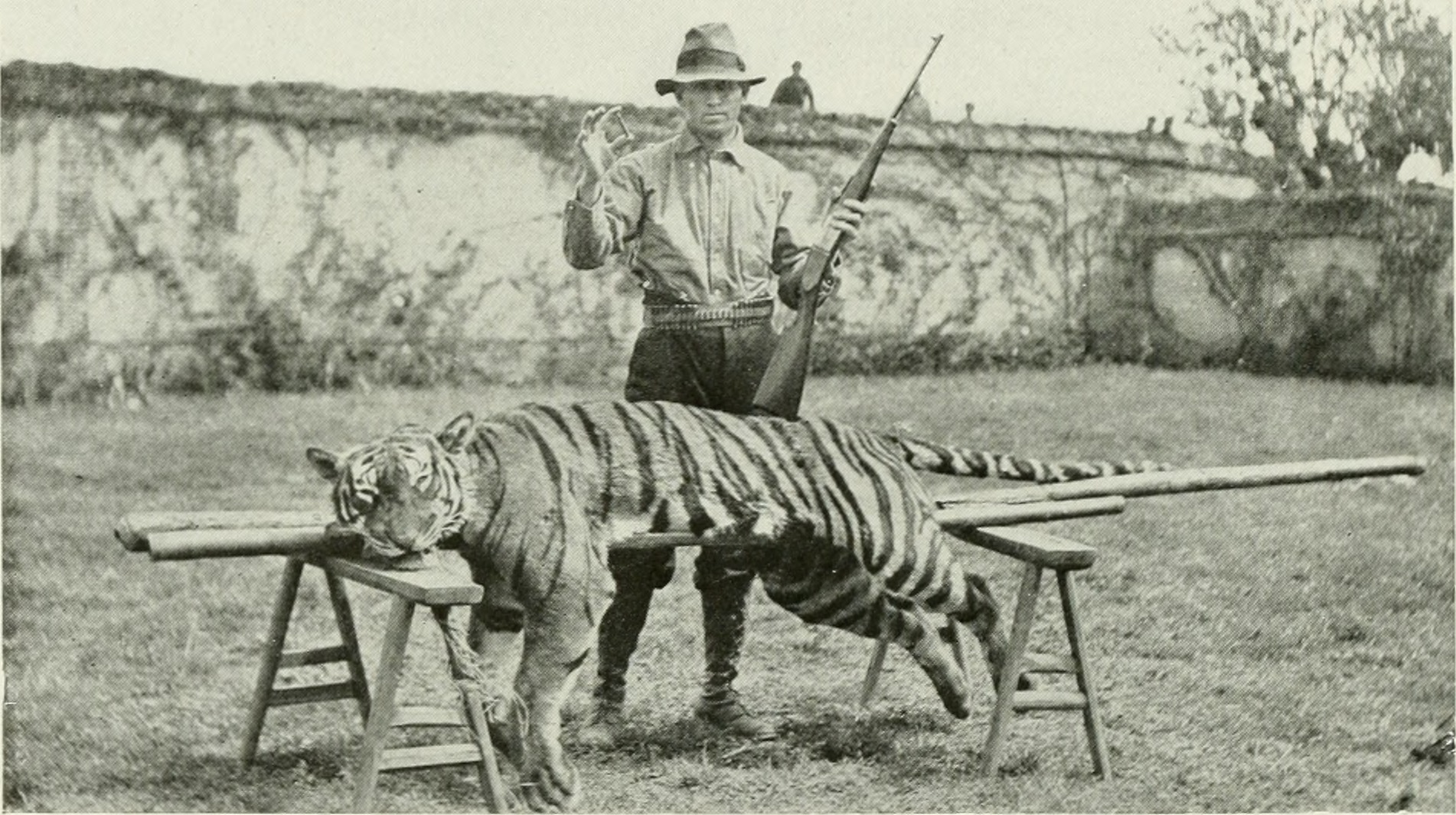
400 pound Tiger taken by Reverend H. R. Caldwell using a Savage Model 99 chambered for .22 Savage Hi-Power

The .22 Savage Hi-Power's relatively high velocity for the time and "shocking" power led to an initial surge of popularity, and was attributed with almost magical killing powers even on large and dangerous soft-skinned game such as tigers. Missionary H. R. Caldwell used his .22 Savage Hi-Power on a 400 pound tiger in China with success, something the Savage rifle company exploited in its advertising for the cartridge in the early days. The famous elephant-hunter W. D. M. Bell used a .22 Savage Hi-Power to kill forest buffalo in West Africa in the 1920s, and reported in his magazine articles that the cartridge was popular at that time for red deer stalking in Scotland. Michigan author and hunter James Oliver Curwood used a Savage 1899 chambered in 22 Hi-Power to hunt mountain goats in Alberta with Canadian hunting guide, Jack Otto. While it was used in the UK on deer as large as Red Stags, it fell out of favour as a big game cartridge after being superseded by other cartridge developments such as the .250-3000. As time went on, other .22 centerfire cartridges outstripped it in performance such as the .220 Swift, and with the advent of the .223 Remington in the 1960s, the cartridge was considered obsolete. Today it is regarded as a vintage round, and aficionados use it for small game hunting in similar applications as the .223 Remington, though it is used for deer hunting where it is legal to do so. In Europe the cartridge is still chambered in drillings and similar combination guns, and the cartridge is still used by hunters for smaller European deer species such as Roe deer.

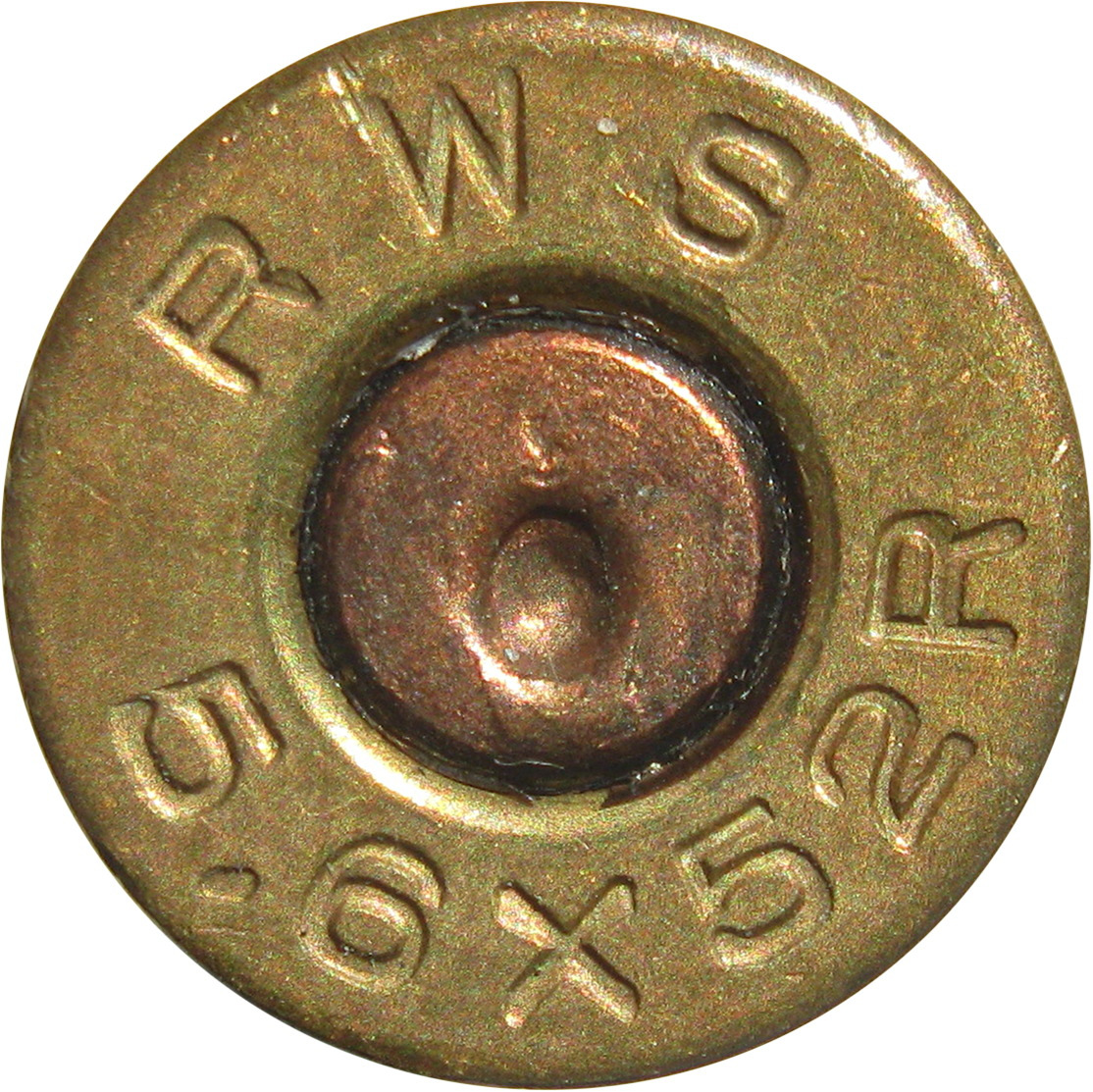
RWS 5,6x52R cartridge base

Although the .22 Savage Hi-Power is no longer made in the United States, it is still produced by several European makers. In Europe, the .22 Savage Hi-Power is called the "5.6×52mmR", and is still made by RWS, Norma, Sellier & Bellot, and Prvi Partizan.

== See also ==
- List of rimmed cartridges
