= Savage Model 99 =

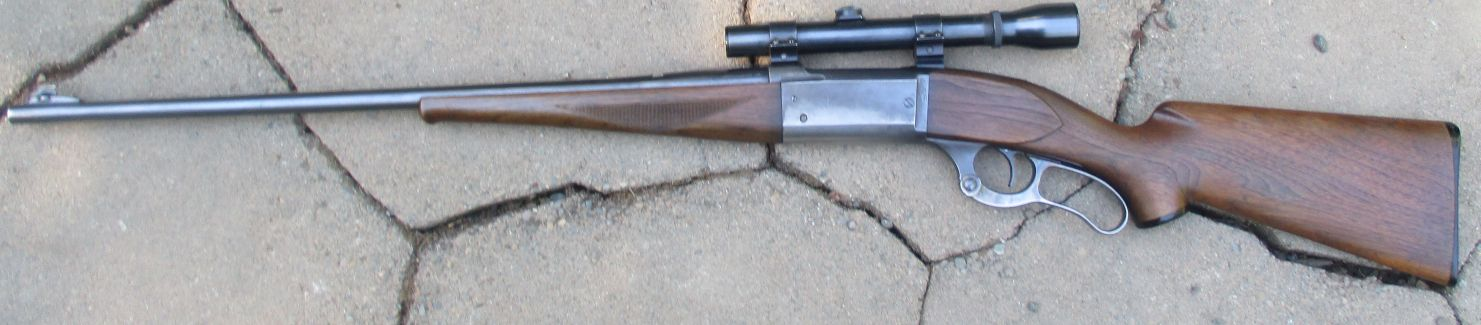
- A Savage Model 99 with Weaver Scope
- Type: Lever Action, hammerless rifle
- Place of origin: United States

Service history
- Used by: See Users
- Wars: World War I

Production history
- Designer: Arthur W. Savage
- Designed: 1892–1899
- Manufacturer: Savage Arms Company
- Produced: 1899–1997
- No. built: 1,000,000+
- Variants: Model 1892, Model 1895, Model 1899

Specifications
- Barrel length: 20 in (508 mm) to 26 in (660 mm)
- Cartridge: .303 Savage, .32-40 Winchester, .300 Savage, .30-30 Winchester, .25-35 Winchester, .250 Savage, .22 Savage Hi-Power, .22-250 Remington, .243 Winchester, .308 Winchester, .358 Winchester, 7mm-08 Remington, .284 Winchester, .38-55 Winchester, .375 Winchester, .410 bore
- Action: Lever action, hammerless, tilting bolt
- Feed system: Rotary five-shot magazine plus one in the chamber, later models had a detachable box magazine.
- Sights: Open iron sights, tang or receiver-mounted aperture sights. Later models had provisions for mounting rifle scopes

The Savage Model 99, Model 1899, and their predecessor the Model 1895 are a series of hammerless lever action rifles created by the Savage Arms Company in Utica, New York. The Model 99 family featured a unique rotary magazine, and later added some detachable magazine models. The rifle was extremely popular with big game hunters and was even issued to the Montreal Home Guard during the First World War.

== History ==
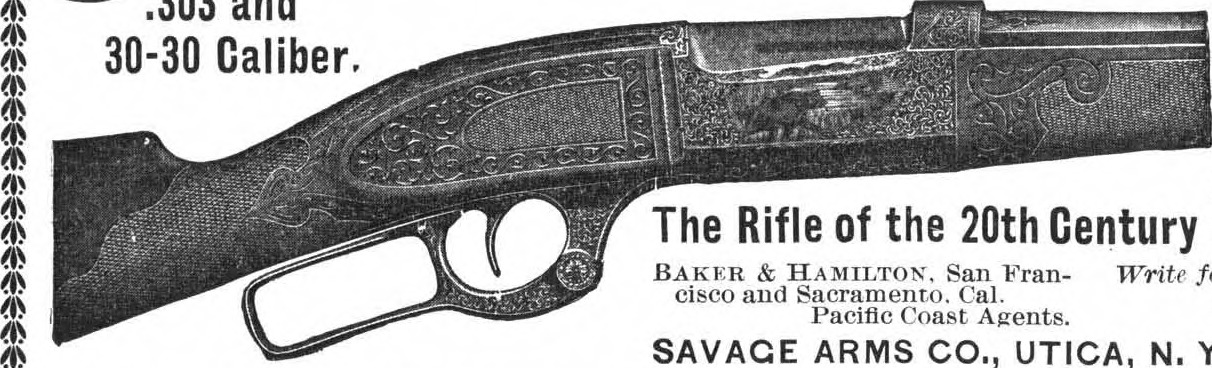
The Savage 99 in Scientific American Volume 85 Number 10 (September 1901)

The earliest predecessor of the Model 1895 was the Model 1892, and it was one of the contending rifle models offered to the U.S. Army when they were looking to replace the Springfield Model 1873 trapdoor rifle. The Krag–Jørgensen was chosen over the Savage and other models. The Model 1892 was never put into production (and indeed pre-dated the actual establishment of the Savage Repeating Arms Company; the Model 1892 was a collaborative venture between Arthur Savage and probably the E.W. Bliss Company). Followed by the Model 1893 prototypes, that evolved into the Model 1895 whose prototypes and design was done by Colt's Manufacturing Company and production rifles made by Marlin Firearms. A Model 1895 musket possibly in .30-40 Krag was the winner of an 1896 competition for a New York National Guard rifle contract, beating out the Winchester Model 1895 and several other rifles. Political controversy and the offer of free rifles from the US Army led to the cancellation of the contract, and the New York National Guard was therefore equipped with obsolete single-shot Trapdoor Springfield rifles during the Spanish–American War. Similarly, the Model 1895 musket won a contract for arming the Mexican Army in 1897, but again had to cancel - this time due to lack of a factory to produce the rifles. Later refinements to the Model 1895 design led to the Model 1899, whose name was changed to the Model 99 with the introduction of the 300 Savage cartridge in 1921. In 1899, Savage offered to convert any existing Model 1895 rifle or carbine to Model 1899 configuration for a $5 fee. After changes to the Model 1899 receiver and internals in 1908, Savage would no longer work on 1895's or pre-1909 1899's and would instead offer to sell a new rifle at discounted price.

During World War I, the Montreal Home Guard was issued Model 1899 rifles in "musket" form, which incorporated a bayonet lug and military-style stock. While similar to the earlier catalogued 1899 military muskets, it has several differences and is thus known as the Montreal Home Guard Musket. The Montreal Home Guard contract was for a total of 2,500 rifles, though according to the Savage ledgers only 803 were delivered. These rifles were chambered in .303 Savage, as altering the design for the Canadian standard .303 British Mk VII cartridge would have resulted in an unacceptable delay in delivery. Guardsmen were responsible for purchasing their own rifles and had the option of having their names stamped on the stock. Many also chose to have their names engraved on the left side of the receiver.

Initially the Model 1895 was available only chambered in the 303 Savage, a similar cartridge to Winchester's .30-30 but usually loaded with heavier bullets of 185gr or 190gr. The Model 1899 was also only available in 303 Savage initially, but in 1900 they added the 30-30 and in 1903 they added the 25-35, the 32-40, and 38-55. Charles Newton worked with Savage Arms to introduce the 22HP in 1912, the 250-3000 in 1915, and finally the .300 Savage in 1921. In 1956 the .243 Win, .308 Win and .358 Win were added, and later the .284 Win, .375 Win, .22-250 and 7mm08 would all make appearances.

Originally incorporated as the Savage Repeating Arms Company from 1894 to 1897 in Utica, NY (present on the barrel address of Model 1895's), the company reincorporated as the Savage Arms Company in 1898. This lasted until 1917 when the company changed to the Savage Arms Corporation after being bought by Driggs-Seabury, and they have kept that name since then. The company produced Model 1899s and Model 99s in Utica, NY from 1899 to 1946, Model 99s in Chicopee Falls, MA from 1947 to 1959, and in Westfield, MA from 1960 to 2003.

== Design ==
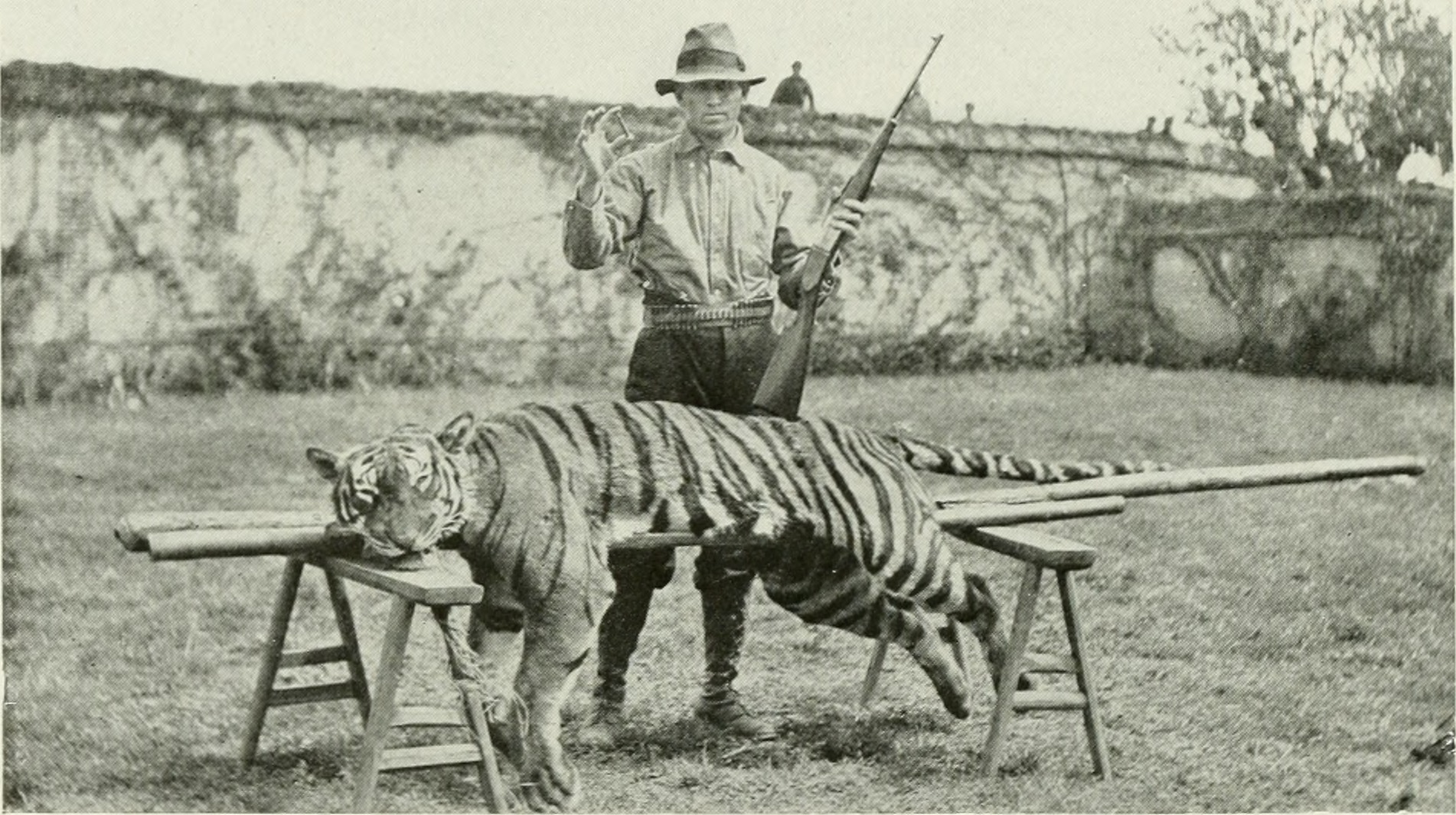
400-pound tiger taken by Reverend H. R. Caldwell using a Savage 99 chambered for .22 Savage Hi-Power

The Model 99 and Model 1899 were preceded by the Model 1895, which was the first hammerless lever-action rifle. The 1895, as well as the later Model 1899 and early Model 99, used a five-shot rotary magazine to hold the cartridges. The rotating magazine uses a spring-loaded spool with grooves to hold the cartridges. The Savage 1899 took advantage of the spool to include a counter to indicate how many rounds are left in the magazine. The Model 99 continued using this system for many years, except for later models which had a detachable magazine.

The rotating magazine design allowed the rifle to be one of the first lever-action rifles to use spitzer bullets commercially introduced in the decade after its development. Previous lever-action rifles used tubular magazines, which placed cartridges of ammunition end to end. The pointed tips of a spitzer bullet would touch the primer of the cartridge in front of it, possibly causing an accidental discharge. Another novel safety feature was a cocking indicator. On the Model 1895 this was a hole on top of the bolt through which a C (Cocked) or S (Safe) could be seen. On early Model 1899's this changed to a tab on top of the bolt which raised up when the rifle was cocked and could be visually seen or easily felt by touch; and in 1908 it changed to a small pin which would protrude above the top of the receiver to indicate the rifle was cocked and ready to fire.

A number of special option features were available for Model 1895's, 1899's and 99's through the 1930's including multiple grades of engraving, several different checkering styles, pistol grips, a takedown option, better sights and peep sights, special order buttplates, and even having parts of the rifle silver or gold plated.The Model 1899 had a number of special grades available which came with sets of special order features, such as the Leader Grade, Rival Grade, Excelsior Grade, Monarch Grade, etc. By the end of production, Savage had sold the 99 family in 58 different models and special grade configurations.

== Notable variants ==
- 99C: "C" presumably means "clip", because the 99C was the only variant to have a detachable box magazine rather than the iconic internal rotary magazine. The Model 99C was primarily based on the 99F and was produced from 1965 to 1997.
- 99CD: Deluxe version of the Model 99C. The Model 99CD had a Monte Carlo cheekpiece stock. The 99CD was produced from 1975 to 1981.
- 99CE: "CE" meaning "Centennial Edition". The 99CE is a 99C with an engraved nickel finish.
- 99D: Musket variant produced only in 1915 as a special order for the Montreal Home Guard and chambered only in .303 Savage. The 99D featured a bayonet lug with a Savage-made bayonet, finger grooves, adjustable rear sight, and a front sight hood. The 99D-Musket was also the only Savage 99 to have a front handguard.
- 99DE: "DE" presumably means "Deluxe Edition". It was Savage's cheaper "citation grade" model, almost identical to the 99PE, only had less engraving and the stock was the same as on the 99DL. The 99DE also has a blued receiver as an option instead of a nickel finish of the 99PE. Like the 99PE, the 99DE was offered in a 22-inch barrel only and was produced from 1965 to 1970.
- 99DL: "DL" meaning "De-Luxe". The 99DL was a deluxe version of the 99EG and featured a Monte Carlo stock, jeweled bolt, factory-installed sling swivel studs, and a gold trigger. Chambered in .250-3000 Savage, .300 Savage, .243 Winchester, .308 Winchester and .358 Winchester.
- 99E: "E" meaning "Economy". The 99E was the more affordable model that eliminated features like the round counter on the side, and machine-checkered stock, and the stock was made from cheaper birch wood rather than walnut like on other models. Sold anywhere from 15 to 30 dollars cheaper than other Model 99s. 99Es can usually be identified by the light color of the stock. The 99E was produced from around 1960 to 1984 and was chambered in .300 Savage, .308 Winchester, .243 Winchester and .250-3000 Savage.
- 99F: "F" meaning "Featherweight". The 99F was about a full pound lighter than most other Savage 99 models. Chambered in .250-3000 Savage, .300 Savage, .308 Winchester, .358 Winchester, .284 Winchester and .243 Winchester.
- 99H: Same as the 99F, only it was a takedown design. Made in .250-3000 Savage, .300 Savage, .303 Savage, .30-30 Winchester and .22 Savage High power from 1923 to 1940. The 99H has a curved, carbine-style buttplate and later models had a barrel band and a ramp front sight.
- 99K: Features an engraved receiver, tang sight, and a premium non-Monte Carlo walnut stock. President Franklin D. Roosevelt presented one of these to the Shah of Iran, Mohammad Reza Pahlavi, because he was a hunter.
- 99M: "M" meaning "Monte Carlo" stock. The M was never its own model, rather some 99DLs, 99DEs or 99PEs were designated "99M".
- 99PE: "PE" stands for "Presentation Edition". The 99PE was the same as the 99DL only it had a richly engraved receiver, tang and lever. The engraving was done entirely by hand. The 99PE also has a tarnish-resistant nickel finish. Chambered in .243 Winchester, .284 Winchester and .308 Winchester. The 99E was the only post-1960 Savage 99 to be sold with the earlier lever safety rather than the later tang safety. Like the 99DE, the 99PE was offered in a 22-inch barrel only and was produced from 1965 to 1970.
- 99R: "R" presumably means "Receiver", because the 99R was drilled and tapped for a scope from the factory.
- 99RS: "RS" meaning "Rear Sight". This was a Savage 99R with a peep sight by the tang.
- 99T: "T" meaning "Tang" sight. Very rare variant. Produced from 1935 to 1940. Chambered in .250-3000, .30-30, .303 Savage, .22 High Power and .300 Savage. Came with 20 and 22 inch barrel lengths.

== Users ==
- Canada: Issued to the Montreal Home Guard as the Model 99D Musket, equipped with bayonet lug and altered stock.
