= .30 Newton =

Rifle cartridge

- Type: Rifle
- Place of origin: United States

Production history
- Designer: Charles Newton
- Designed: 1913

Specifications
- Parent case: 11.2x72 Schuler
- Case type: Rimless
- Bullet diameter: .308 in (7.8 mm)
- Neck diameter: .340 in (8.6 mm)
- Shoulder diameter: .491 in (12.5 mm)
- Base diameter: .523 in (13.3 mm)
- Rim diameter: .525 in (13.3 mm)
- Case length: 2.52 in (64 mm)
- Overall length: 3.35 in (85 mm)
- Case capacity: 89.0 gr. water
- Rifling twist: 10 to 12
- Primer type: large rifle

Ballistic performance
Bullet mass/type	Velocity	Energy
150 gr (10 g)	3,208 ft/s (978 m/s)	3,445 ft⋅lbf (4,671 J)
172 gr (11 g)	3,000 ft/s (910 m/s)	3,440 ft⋅lbf (4,660 J)
225 gr (15 g)	2,610 ft/s (800 m/s)	3,470 ft⋅lbf (4,700 J)
- Sources: Newton Arms Company Catalog. 14th Edition: 1920. IN "Cartridges of the World" Frank C. Barnes, 3rd Edition: 1972.

The .30 Newton cartridge was designed by Charles Newton in 1913, based on a German caliber of the period, the 11.2x72 Schuler. Newton originally called the cartridge the 30 Adolph Express after Fred Adolph, a well known immigrant gunsmith from Germany at the time, who had proposed the idea of necking rimless German cartridges down to produce a high velocity hunting cartridge.

The Newton Arms Company was the only manufacturer of commercial rifles chambered for this cartridge. It should not be confused with the .30 Belted Newton (a.k.a. .30-338), which is a different cartridge not designed by Charles Newton. Although suitable for any large North American game, it is an obsolete round no longer manufactured. Before World War II, loaded cartridges were once offered by Western Cartridge Company. Small runs of 30 Newton brass are occasionally made by Jamison Brass. Cases for 30 Newton can be easily made from .375 Ruger as they are very similar other than the caliber of the case neck; so much so that many assume Ruger based their cartridge on the 30 Newton case. 8x68S brass can also be used.

== Bibliography ==
- Charles Newton: Father of High Velocity. Jennings. 1985. ASIN B00147N8N4.

== See also ==
- List of rifle cartridges
- .35 Newton
