= Arthur William Savage =

British firearm designer

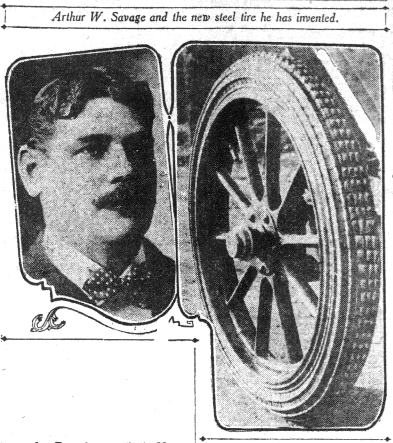
- Newspaper photo Arthur Savage and a new steel tire, circa 1911
- Born: Arthur William Savage; May 19, 1857; Kingston, Jamaica, British West Indies
- Died: September 22, 1938 (aged 81); San Diego, California, U.S.
- Occupations: Inventor, explorer, businessman
- Spouse: Annie Bryant
- Children: Arthur John Savage

Arthur William Savage (May 19, 1857 – September 22, 1938), was a Jamaican-British businessman, inventor, and explorer. He is most famous for inventing the Savage Model 99 lever-action rifle, which remained in production for over 100 years, and founding Savage Arms. However, his most lasting and valuable inventions may be radial tires, and it has been argued, the modern detachable box magazine used in almost all modern military firearms. He also invented an early torpedo and built and raced cars.

== Early life ==
He was born in Kingston, Jamaica, British West Indies. His father was Welsh, a special commissioner to the West Indies, charged with setting up an educational system for the slaves emancipated in 1834.

== Travels ==
In the late 1880s he took his family to Australia, homesteading in a covered wagon. He came to own what was then the largest cattle ranch in Australia. Eleven years later he sold it and bought a coffee plantation in Jamaica. In 1892 he moved to Utica, New York, and hired himself to a railroad, the Utica Belt Line Street Railroad (See List of New York railroads). He also got part-time work at a gun factory, the Utica Hammer Magazine Company.

== Savage Arms ==
Savage and his son Arthur John began designing guns. His first model in 1887 was a lever-action rifle with the magazine in the stock, rather than under the barrel.

Six years later, he patented a lever-action rifle able to shoot then-modern guncotton military center-fire cartridges with .303-caliber spitzer bullets. This "Model 95" was the direct predecessor of the Savage Model 99. Savage invented a novel rotary magazine rifle. A benefit of this magazine was that it had a cartridge counter on the left side of the receiver that enabled the shooter to tell how many cartridges remained in the magazine. Lacking sufficient manufacturing capacity the first 9600 (plus or minus) Model 1895 rifles were contracted to be built by Marlin Repeating Arms and are so marked with the JM proof mark. In 1894, Savage started Savage Arms in rented space on Hubbell street in Utica, New York, to produce his new rifle. Slightly later, in 1897, he filed for the patent on a nearly identical gun with a removable box magazine. This is substantially the modern Savage Model 99 lever-action rifle. It stayed in production until 1999.

James Paris Lee patented a detachable box magazine,(U.S. patent #221,328) November 4, 1879. The modern removable box magazine often seen on military rifles was invented in 1908 by Savage, as an improvement to the Model 99. It did not come into wide use until his patent expired in 1942 with the obvious exception of the family of rifles designed by James Paris Lee and adopted by the USN and the British Empire; first as the Lee–Metford and later as the Lee–Enfield rifles. The box magazine has many attractive features that ensured its eventual dominance: shoulders to retain cartridges when it is removed from the rifle, operates reliably with cartridges of different lengths and is insertable and removable at any time with any number of cartridges. This allows the operator to reload the gun infrequently, carry magazines rather than loose cartridges, and to easily change the types of cartridges. It is assembled from inexpensive stamped sheet metal. When empty the follower stops the bolt from engaging the chamber, informing the operator of the gun's emptiness before any attempt to fire.

Savage collaborated on the invention of the Savage-Halpine torpedo, which was eventually adopted by the Brazilian navy. Although U.S. sea trials were successful, it was not adopted in the U.S., due to political considerations. Savage moved to Duarte, California to pursue other business ventures and in 1905, Savage sold his remaining interest in the Savage Arms company.

== Savage Tire, later years and death ==
While in California in 1901, Savage attempted to grow oranges, but this failed. Savage formed the Savage Tire company, a $5 million corporation formed to make tires and inner tubes. He later moved to San Diego, where he invented radial tires as well as new production methods. Savage formed another gun company with his son, Arthur John, in 1917, but this also failed. Savage later sold Savage Tire in 1919.

Savage tried a number of other occupations before his death, including oil drilling, gold mining, pipe, brick and ceramics. Savage also managed the San Gabriel Water Company. In 1938, Savage was diagnosed with terminal cancer. Faced with a slow and painful death, Arthur Savage died by suicide at the age of 81, on September 22, 1938, in San Diego, while still director of his successful tire company.
