= Charles Newton (inventor) =

Personal Info
Birth	January 8, 1868, Delevan, New York
Death	March 9, 1932 (aged 64) New Haven, Connecticut

Company Info
Name	Newton Arms Co. Inc. Chas. Newton Rifle Co. Buffalo Newton Rifle Co. LeverBolt Rifle Co.
Foundation	August 4, 1914, New York City
Fate	1918, Entered into receivership
Headquarters	(United States) Buffalo, New York

Notable Weapons
- Model 1914 Rifle Group; Model 1916 First Model; Model 1922 German Imports; Model 1924 Second Model; LeverBolt Rifle

Charles Newton (1868–1932) was an American lawyer and firearm enthusiast known for his experiments with cartridge design which led to the creation of the .22 Savage Hi-Power rifle cartridge which was adopted by the Savage Arms as a commercial firearm cartridge. This success was soon followed by the design of the .250-3000 Savage.

Charles also experimented with wildcats based on the .30-06 Springfield case, most notably creating a forerunner of the .25-06 Remington. This cartridge was first introduced as the .25 Newton Special. There were probably no firearms produced in this caliber by Netwon. It soon evolved into the .256 Newton designed to use, at first, a 123-grain bullet followed by later upgrades to 129-grain and 140-grain bullets. Newton's premise was to use a large case for each caliber he developed in order for the larger powder charge to propel the bullet at high velocity resulting in effective terminal ballistics.

Newton developed several calibers. The best known are the .22 Newton (90-grain bullet), .256 Newton, .30 Newton (180-grain bullet), .33 Newton (200-grain bullet), .35 Newton (250-grain bullet), and .40 Newton (300-grain bullet). From 1914 until the late 1920s, he entered into various endeavors to promote and sell rifles in his proprietary calibers.

== Newton cartridges ==
The .256 Newton was a high-velocity, rimless centerfire cartridge introduced in 1913. It was based on the .30-06 Springfield military cartridge and developed in conjunction with the Western Cartridge Company. It was loaded with 123 gr (8 g) with a muzzle velocity of 3,103 ft/s (946 m/s), and 2,632 ft⋅lbf (3,569 J) of energy.

The .30 Newton was high-velocity, rimless centerfire cartridge introduced in 1913. It was based on a German caliber of the period, the 11.2x72 Schuler. The cartridges were produced by the Western Cartridge Company. It was loaded with 150-gr (10 g) bullet, with a muzzle velocity of 3,208 ft/s (978 m/s), and 3,445 ft⋅lbf (4,671 J) of energy.

The .35 Newton was a rimless centerfire cartridge introduced in 1915, two years after the .30 Newton, and the cartridges were produced by the Western Cartridge Company until 1936. It is based on the .30 Newton case, necked up to .358 caliber. It was loaded with 250 grain hollow point bullet, with a muzzle velocity of about 2800 ft/s.

== Newton rifles ==
To promote his proprietary cartridges and ensure a supply of high-quality rifles capable of safely withstanding the high chamber pressure developed by them, Charles incorporated the Newton Arms Co. Inc. in 1914. The earliest of many catalogs issued by Newton offered Mauser and Sauer- Mauser rifles converted, probably by Fred Adolph, to Adolph and Newton calibers. Fred Adolph was a gunsmith in Genoa, New York. He and Newton worked together to design some of the early calibers. These cartridges were initially named Adolph calibers and later named using Newton in place of Adolph.

In 1914, Charles Newton made arrangements with Mauser to import rifles in 6.5 calibers in order to convert them in the US to .256 Newton. One order of 24 rifles arrived in August 1914 and three more orders were never received due to the start of World War I. The outbreak of World War I led Charles to manufacture his own rifles. With the employment of noted barrel-maker and gunsmith Harry Pope, Newton assured his rifles would be of the highest quality.

These First Model 1916 rifles were made in Buffalo, New York. Due to financial difficulties and the inability to make ammunition because of the war efforts, the company produced rifles under Newton for 16 months. At this time, about 2,400 rifles were manufactured. Newton Arms Co. Inc. went into receivership for the next 98 days. The receiver then sold out to a dealer in used factory equipment who in turn sold the equipment and leftover rifles to the Newton Arms Corporation based in New York, New York. They were also in business for about 16 months, were sued by Newton, and sold the remaining rifles to Kirkland Bros. Hardware. Approximately 1,600 rifles were sold by Newton's successors making the total number of Model 1916s produced equal to 4000 rifles.

Newton started the Chas. Newton Rifle Co. in 1919 and imported about 100 German-made Sauer-Mauser rifles, all in .256 Newton caliber. This model is known as the Model 1922 Newton.

The Buffalo Newton Rifle Co. was organized in 1923 for the purpose of manufacturing a newly designed rifle. The first rifles were made in 1924 and became the Second Model 1924 Buffalo Newton rifle. The factory was in New Haven, Connecticut. Only about 1,000 of this model Newton rifle were produced.

Charles Newton's last attempt at rifle manufacture was the Leverbolt straight-pull rifle, called that way because it combined Mauser-style bolt with a lever-handle rotating it. Only prototypes were made, because Martin required 500 secured orders to start limited production, which Newton couldn't find.

Newton's innovative rifle and cartridge designs contributed much to the firearms industry and some of his developments are used today by rifle makers.

== List of Patents ==
- U.S. patent 1,074,809 Powder and Propellant for Firearms, Granted October 7, 1913.
- U.S. patent 1,096,558 Rifle Bullet or Projectile, Granted May 12, 1914.
- U.S. patent 1,172,035 Projectile, Granted February 15, 1916.
- U.S. patent 1,215,181 Trigger Mechanism for Firearms, Granted February 6, 1917. 1/2 Assigned to John F. Nagel of Buffalo, New York
- U.S. patent 1,328,334 Projectile, Granted January 20, 1920. Assigned to Frank N. Stone of Cleveland, Ohio.
