= .303 Savage =

Rimmed, .30 caliber rifle cartridge

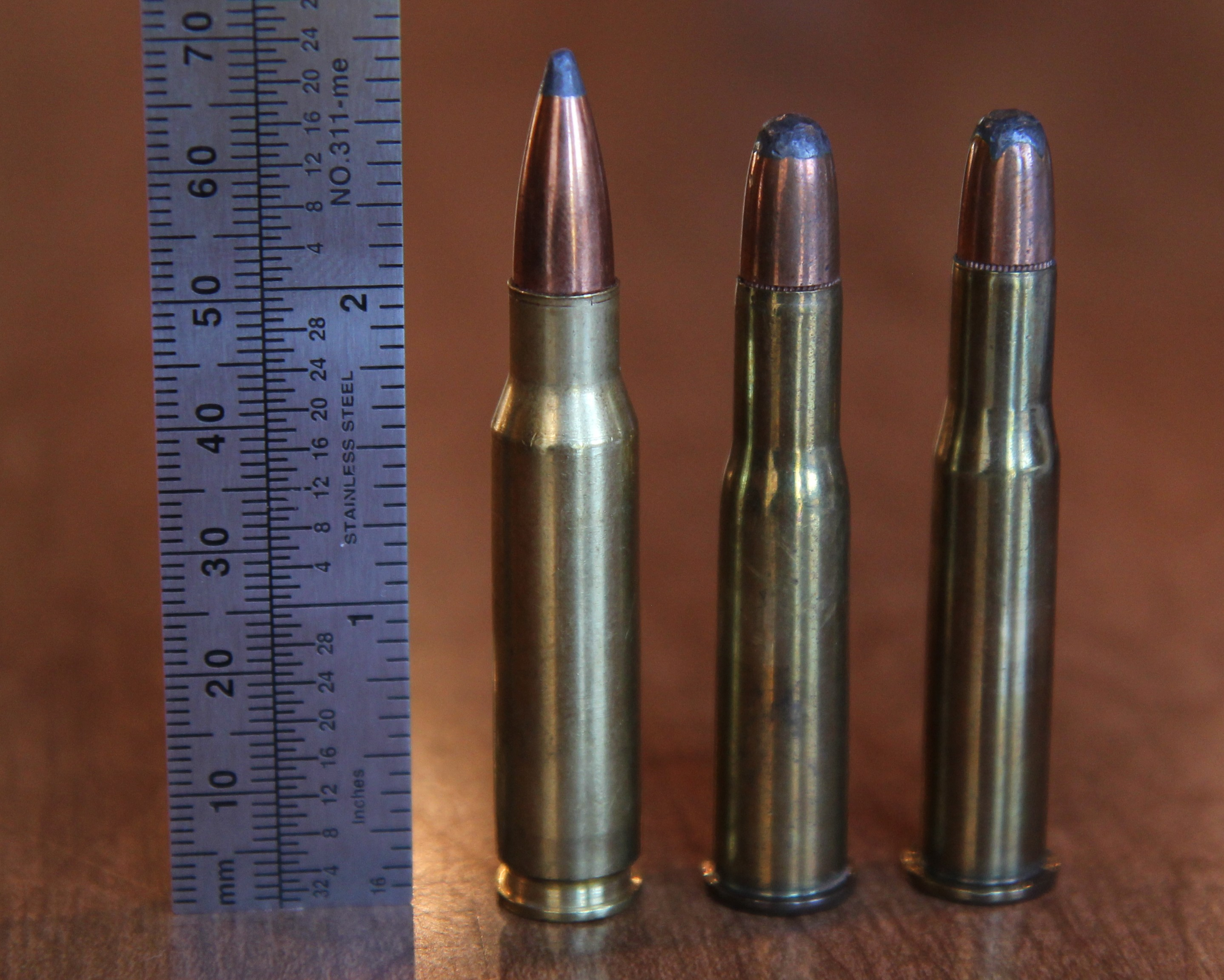
- Round-nosed .303 Savage (center) with .308 Winchester (left) and .30-30 Winchester (right)
- Type: Rifle
- Place of origin: United States

Production history
- Designer: Savage Arms
- Manufacturer: Savage Arms
- Produced: 1895

Specifications
- Case type: Rimmed, bottleneck
- Bullet diameter: .308 in (7.8 mm)
- Neck diameter: .333 in (8.5 mm)
- Shoulder diameter: .413 in (10.5 mm)
- Base diameter: .442 in (11.2 mm)
- Rim diameter: .505 in (12.8 mm)
- Rim thickness: .063 in (1.6 mm)
- Case length: 2.015 in (51.2 mm)
- Overall length: 2.520 in (64.0 mm)
- Primer type: Large rifle

Ballistic performance
Bullet mass/type	Velocity	Energy
170 gr (11 g) SP	2,090 ft/s (640 m/s)	1,649 ft⋅lbf (2,236 J)

The .303 Savage is a rimmed, .30 caliber rifle cartridge developed by the Savage Arms Company in 1894, which was designed as a short (as short as the .30-30 Winchester) action cartridge for their Savage Model 99 hammerless lever-action rifle. The cartridge was designed for smokeless powder at a time when black-powder cartridges were still popular. The .303 Savage using heavier 190 grain bullets had a reputation of being better on heavy game than the .30-30 Win, but it was considered a marginal difference.

Savage produced a half dozen loads for it. With its 190-grain loading, it was used on such animals as deer and moose.

Despite the similar names, the .303 Savage and the .303 British cartridge are not interchangeable due to differences in case dimensions and bullet diameter. Despite its name, the .303 Savage uses a .308 in (7.8 mm) diameter bullet, while the .303 British uses a slightly larger .312 in (7.92 mm) bullet and gets its name from having a land diameter of .303 in (7.70 mm). Additionally, the .303 British has a longer case length of 2.222 in (56.44 mm) and a much longer overall cartridge length of 3.075 in (78.11 mm), with a shallower shoulder angle of 17°. While the .303 Savage has a case length of 2.015 in (51.2 mm), an overall cartridge length of 2.520 in (64.0 mm), and a much sharper shoulder angle of 32°. As such, a .303 British wouldn't fit inside a .303 Savage chamber and have the bolt be able to close, and if it were to somehow be fired the larger .312 in diameter bullet of the .303 British could become lodged in the smaller .308 inch barrel of the .303 Savage, potentially causing a catastrophic failure.

== History ==
Savage Arms created the .303 Savage as part of an unsuccessful attempt at creating a cartridge for the military. Although the cartridge was never popular with the military, it did become a popular round for civilian hunters. Initially designed round-nosed but becoming a pointed-tip rimmed cartridge in early 1900s, it worked well in the Model 99 rifles that Savage produced because of their rotary magazine. It wasn't as successful in other lever-action rifles because only the round-nose loading were safe to use with their tubular magazines. However, the pointed-tip bullets gave it a ballistic advantage over other traditional lever-action cartridges such as the .30-30 Winchester.

== Reloading ==
The .303 Savage maintains a small community of handloaders. While major ammunition manufacturers have long since halted production, users can procure loaded ammunition and brass cases through smaller manufacturers, such as Norma and Prvi Partizan . Cases can be formed from .30-30 Winchester, .32 Winchester Special, and .38-55 Winchester casings, if no correct brass is available. Great care must be taken as the Winchester brass is about .020 in (0.51 mm) smaller at the base and case failure is possible.

Loads respond well to traditional loads in the same range as the .30-30 or .30 Remington. However, the slightly larger case volume, and stronger rifle action allow for loads that improve significantly over standard loads for the .30-30. It is quite possible to put 190 grain flat points at 1,905 fps as well as 160 grain FTX bullets at 2060 fps, even from 20 in (510 mm) featherweight barrels.

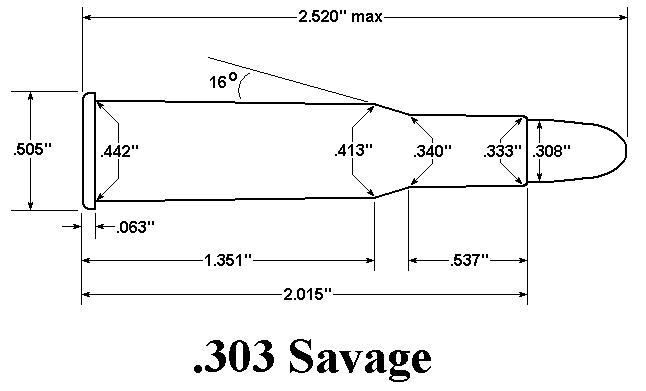

== See also ==
- List of rimmed cartridges
