= Lever action =

Type of firearm action

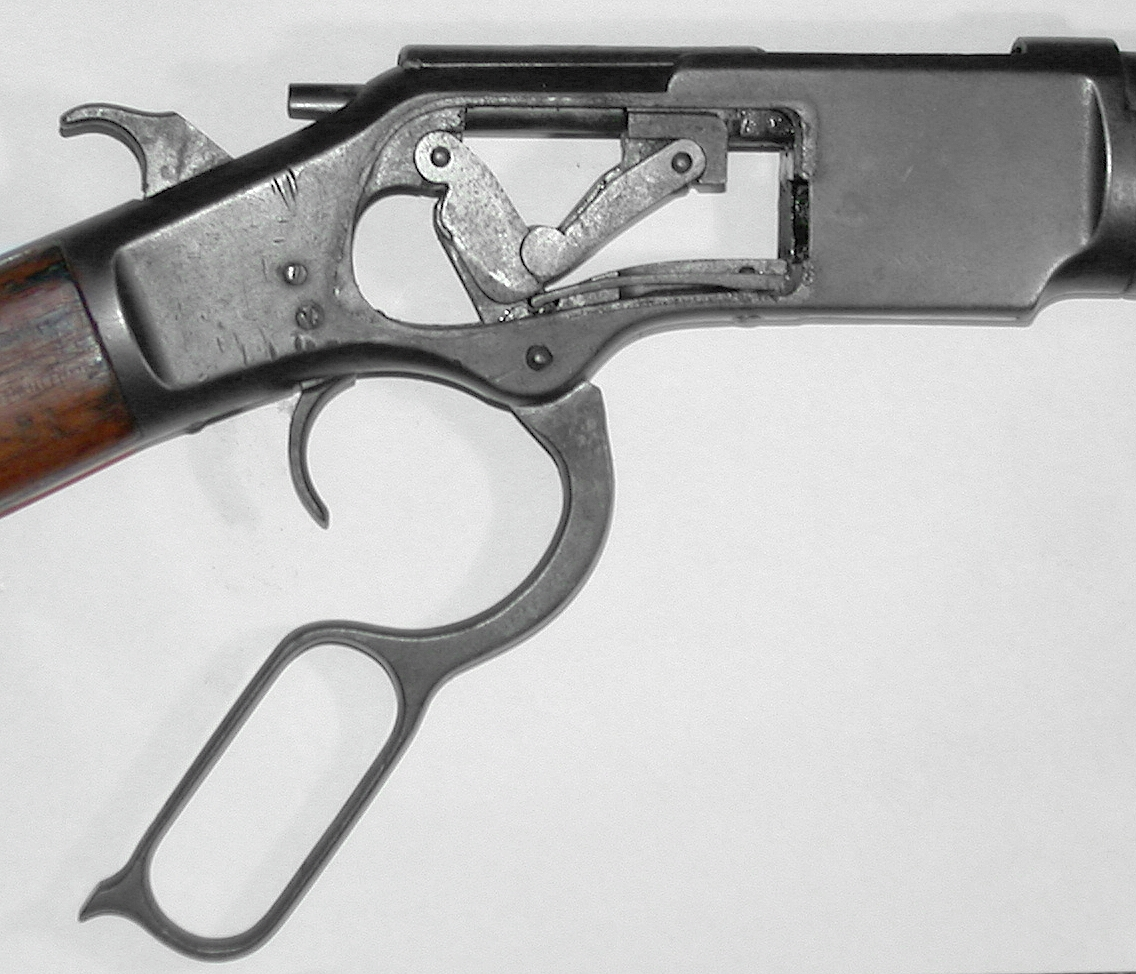
The toggle-link action used in the iconic Winchester Model 1873 rifle, one of the most famous lever-action firearms

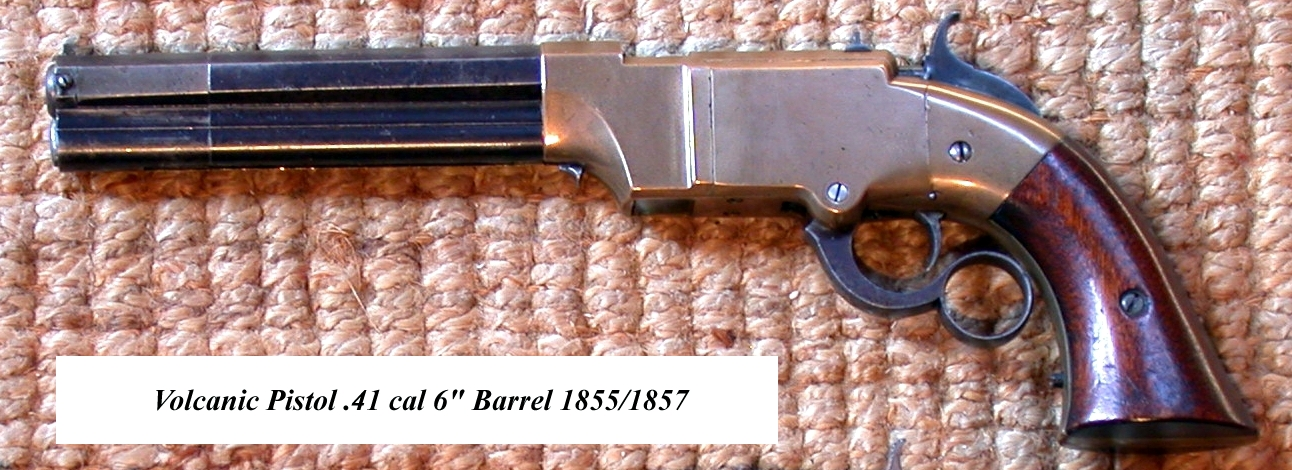
A Volcanic pistol

A lever action is a type of action for repeating firearms that uses a manually operated cocking handle located around the trigger guard area (often incorporating it) that pivots forward to move the bolt via internal linkages which will feed and extract cartridges into and out of the chamber and cock the hammer or firing pin mechanism. Traditionally, the safety mechanism for a lever action is known as the "half-back" or "half-cock", which involves the hammer being pulled about a quarter to half the way back (depending on manufacturer) from its forward position, holding the hammer off the firing pin, preventing accidental discharge if the rifle is dropped; in more recent lever-action firearms made since the mid-20th century, the hammer in half-cock also engages a transfer bar that prevents the trigger from being pulled. Most modern lever-action firearms made since the 1990s have additional safety features, such as a crossbar safety in the rear of the receiver that prevents the hammer from falling forward onto the firing pin when engaged, or a tang safety that prevents the trigger from being pulled. Lever action contrasts with other types of repeating actions, including manual actions like break action, bolt-action, & pump-action, and automatic actions like semi-automatic, burst fire & fully automatic. A firearm using this operating mechanism is colloquially referred to as a levergun.

Most lever-action firearms are rifles, but some lever-actions have been shotguns, and a few have been pistols. The Winchester Repeating Arms Company is arguably the most famous manufacturer of lever-action firearms; other notable manufacturers include Henry Repeating Arms, Marlin Firearms, Mossberg, Rossi, Savage Arms, and Smith & Wesson. Manufacturers like Chiappa Firearms, Norinco, and Uberti are known for making high quality replicas of antique lever-action firearms such as the Henry Model 1860, Winchester Model 1866, & Winchester Model 1873 rifles and the Winchester Model 1887 shotgun, among other models.

== History ==
=== Early Concepts ===
Lever-action firearms have their roots from a lever-action revolver designed by Italian gunsmith Cesar Rosaglio in 1826 and patented in 1829. He designed a gun with a lever mechanism that simultaneously turned the drum and cocked the hammer. In 1829, Rosaglio also designed a percussion cap revolving shotgun.

=== Colt Ring Rifle ===
The first lever-action rifle to be adopted by the military was the Colt's 1st and 2nd model ring lever rifles, both revolving cap and ball rifles that held eight shots, they were the first firearms produced by the Patent Arms Mfg. Co. Paterson, N.J.-Colt's Patent between 1837 and 1841. The ring-lever carbine did not have an exposed hammer that is manually cocked and fired like a traditional revolver, rather a small ring sat in front of its trigger and the user would pull the ring downward and backward toward the trigger, which cocked the weapon and rotated the cylinder. The rifle was available in .34, .36, .38, .40, & .44 calibers and saw limited use by the United States Army in the Seminole Wars in 1838. However, the rifle had many issues that kept it from being widely adopted, its 32 in (810 mm) long barrel and 8.5 lb (3.9 kg) weight made it a massive rifle that was difficult to wield. It was also exorbitantly expensive, in 1838 the Army purchased 50 rifles at a price of $125 each, adjusting for inflation that would be equal to $4,400 per rifle in 2026. The gun was also prone to chain firing, which is when the sparks from a chamber firing manage to get into other chambers, causing them to fire simultaneously, potentially causing the weapon to explode.

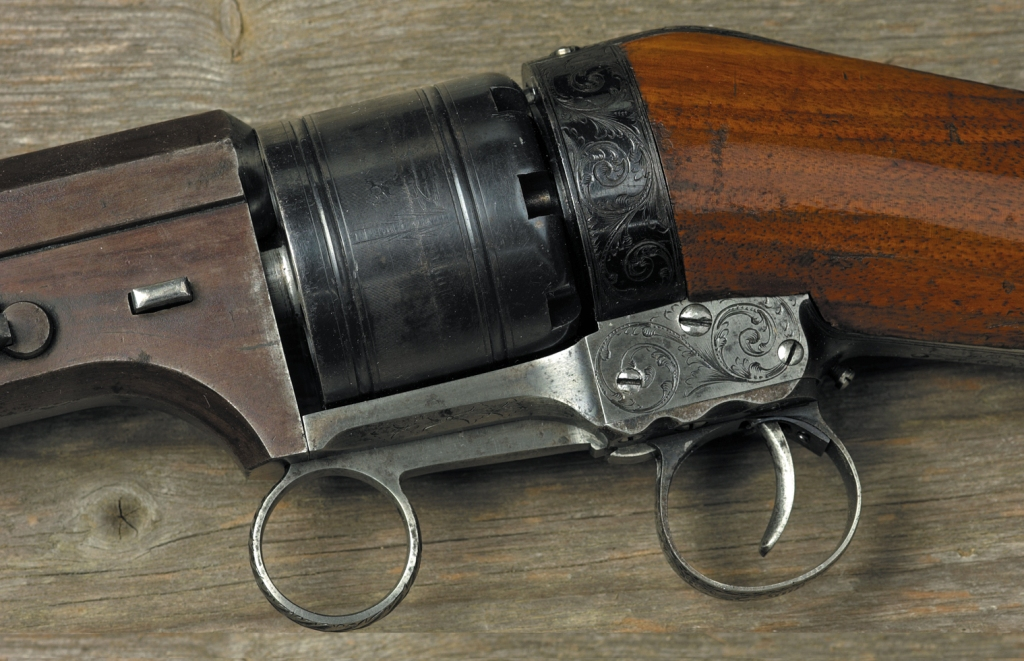
Colt Paterson ring lever rifle

=== Volitional & Volcanic ===
The first lever-action firearm that could be recognized in terms of what the modern concept of a lever action is, was the Volitional repeater invented by Walter Hunt in 1848, a rifle that used a 12-round under-the-barrel magazine tube, making it the first to adopt this type of magazine that became the most common with lever-actions. Another early predecessor to the modern lever action was the Volcanic pistol, invented in 1855 by Daniel B. Wesson and Horace Smith (the founders of Smith & Wesson), along with Walter Hunt who designed the gun's .41 caliber caseless ammunition known as a Rocket Ball. The Volcanic pistol was made by Volcanic Repeating Arms, a company that was eventually reorganized into the Winchester Repeating Arms Company in 1866, with the Volcanic pistols' design being the basis for the Henry Rifle and the Winchester Model 1866. For 170 years, the Volcanic pistol was the only lever-action firearm manufactured by Smith & Wesson, until they introduced the Smith & Wesson Model 1854 lever-action rifle in January of 2024, with the model number being the year S&W was founded. The 1854 is chambered in .357 Magnum, .44 Magnum, .45 Colt, .30-30 Winchester, .360 Buckhammer and .45-70 Government.

=== Spencer Rifle ===
The Spencer rifle was a significant milestone in the history of lever-action rifles. Designed by Christopher Spencer, it was a lever-operated rifle with a removable seven-round tube magazine that loaded into the butt of the stock, a major breakthrough for the time. Some 200,000 rifles were produced between 1860 and 1869, and it was adopted by the United States and used during the American Civil War, which marked the first adoption of an infantry and cavalry rifle with a removable magazine by any country. The early Spencer's rifle lever only served to unlock the action and chamber a new round; the hammer had to be manually cocked after chambering a round.

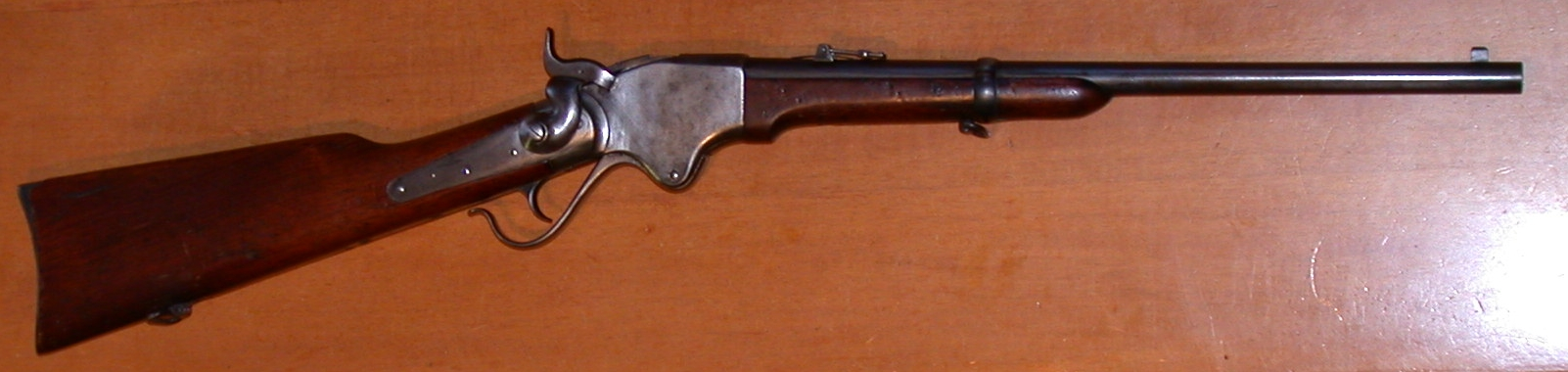
Spencer-carbine M1865, .50 inch

=== Henry Model 1860 ===
The Henry rifle, invented by Benjamin Tyler Henry in 1860 while he was working for Winchester, is widely considered to be the first practical lever-action rifle that was also a commercial success. When designing his rifle, Henry attempted to solve the problems that had prevented prior lever-action firearms like the Volcanic pistol from being widely successful, namely the unreliability of its ammunition. His approach was to design the ammunition first, and then design a gun to accommodate it, to that end he created the self-contained .44 Henry cartridge in 1858. To accommodate the round's higher pressures he designed a larger frame made from brass, and designed a new barrel specifically for the .44 caliber bullet his new rimfire ammo used. He made an under-barrel magazine tube that ran the length of the barrel, giving the rifle an unprecedented 16-round capacity. Other improvements Henry made was perfecting the loading and ejecting mechanism, including designing the bolt to automatically cock the hammer each time the lever was cycled, and he created a firing pin independent of the bolt face. By October 1860, Henry had finished his rifle and received a patent for it, only 8 months after the Spencer was patented. At the time, Winchester did not have the money to retool their machines to mass produce Henry's new rifle, it took a few years for them to get the proper equipment. This delayed the production of the first Henry rifles until 1862, just in time for the eve of the Civil War. About 15,731 Henry rifles were produced, 1,731 for the federal government and 14,000 were made by the New Haven Arms Company for civilian sale, before production ceased in 1866.

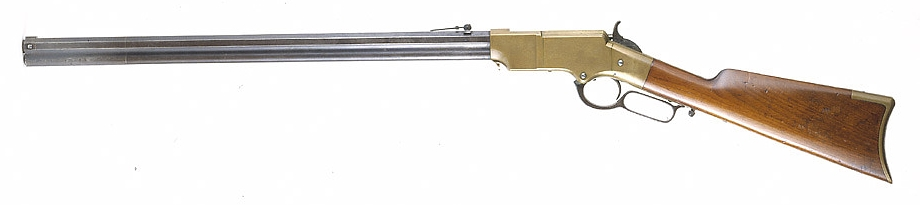
Henry rifle Model 1860, .44 caliber, manufactured by the New Haven Arms Company

=== Winchester 1866 ===
The Henry rifle was replaced by the Winchester Model 1866 after New Haven Arms was acquired by Winchester. The rifle was also known as the Model 1866 “Yellow Boy” due to its polished brass receiver, the "Yellow Boy" was the first lever-action rifle to bear the Winchester name. The Model 1866 was chambered for the same .44 Henry round, but featured several design improvements: most notably a spring-closed loading port on the right-hand side of the frame, directly at the rear of the magazine tube (whereas the Henry was loaded with a loading gate at the end of the magazine tube), this allowed the rifle to be reloaded more quickly. The 1866 was available in three different configurations: an infantry rifle musket with a 27 in (690 mm) barrel, a sporting rifle with a 24 in (610 mm) barrel, and a saddle carbine with a 20 in (510 mm) inch barrel. A total of 170,100 Yellow Boys were produced between 1866 and 1873.

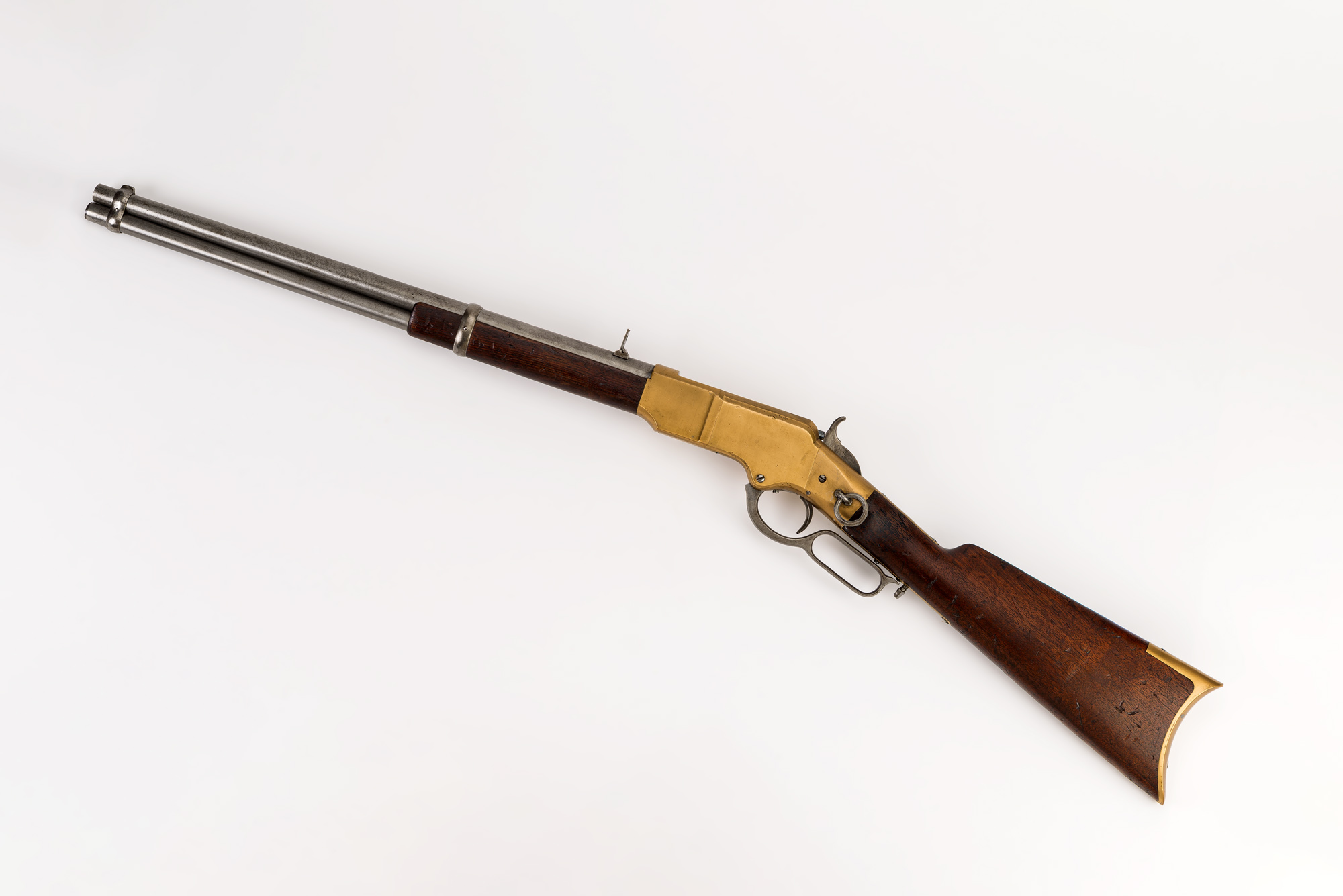
Winchester Model 1866 Yellowboy

=== Winchester 1873 ===
The next major breakthrough in lever-action rifles came with the Winchester Model 1873, chambered for the .44-40 WCF, it was the first lever-action rifle to use a centerfire cartridge, which have substantially more power than rimfire cartridges. The .44-40 would go on to become the most commonly used centerfire cartridge in the late 19th century, and the Winchester 1873 went down in history "as the gun that won the West". Some of the other changes with the Model 1873, compared to the 1866, was the use of a larger steel frame with side plates that made it easier to access the rifle’s innards for cleaning. Roughly 720,000 Model 1873s were produced between 1873 & 1923, it was later made in other chamberings such as .38-40 WCF and .32-20 WCF. In 1875 Winchester made a special, limited edition grade of the rifle known as the "One in One Thousand" grade. Rifles of this grade were test-fired at the factory, and those that met a certain accuracy level were fitted with set triggers and fancy walnut stocks with checkering and engraving on the metal work. A standard model cost about $18 (equivalent to $487.80 in 2026), however a One in One Thousand grade rifle sold for $100 (equivalent to ~$2,800 in 2026). This grade of the 1873 was so coveted and legendary it inspired a film with James Stewart called Winchester '73.

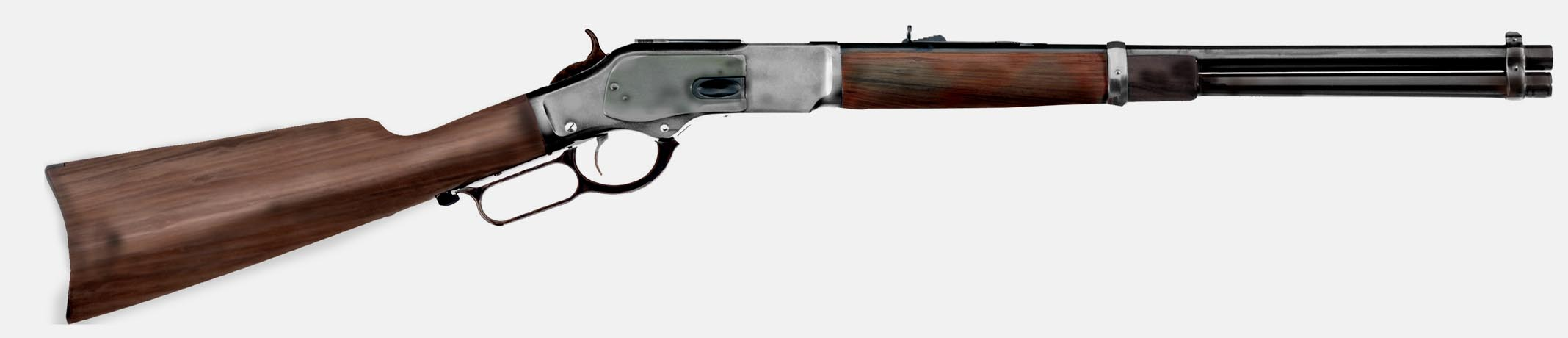
Winchester Model 1873 .44-40 WCF

=== Colt 1883 Burgess ===
The Colt Model 1883 Burgess was Colt's first, and only, attempt at manufacturing a lever-action rifle, and was produced to compete with Winchester's near monopoly of the lever-action market. The rifle was designed by prolific firearm designer Andrew Burgess, whom Colt hired specifically to design a new lever-action rifle, Burgess had previously worked for both Whitney Arms and Marlin, by the end of his career Burgess had 894 firearm patents in his name. The Burgess rifle was designed to be an improvement on the Winchester Model 1873 and featured a very similar appearance and profile, both rifles featured tubular magazines, steel capped fore-ends, a crescent buttplate, and were chambered in .44-40 WCF. However, the Burgess' receiver was 2.75 inches (70 mm) shorter and the gun weighed 11 ounces (310 g) less than the 1873, the receiver had smaller cutouts leaving more metal for strength, and a smaller hole for debris to enter the action. Instead of a hinged loading gate, the Burgess used a sliding gate, and the Burgess had a larger, stronger bolt. The Burgess was priced at $24 (equal to $770-$800 in 2026), while the Winchester 1873 was priced at $17.50 ($566-$570). The Burgess was only in production for 16 months, with a total of 6,403 rifles being manufactured the Burgess is one of the rarer models of Colt firearms, and a rare lever-action rifle, making it highly sought-after and valued by collectors. Despite every indication that it was equal to, and superior in some ways, to the Winchester, it is not known for certain why production of the Burgess abruptly ended in 1885, only 21 months after the rifle was patented and 16 months after it was first produced. The most common theory is that not long after the Burgess rifle was announced by Colt, Winchester announced in 1884 they had designed a new prototype revolver called the Winchester Wetmore-Wells revolver. Legend has it that in late 1884 the executives of Colt and Winchester had a private meeting where Winchester allegedly told Colt of their intentions to invest in a new revolver, but that they would be willing to change their minds if Colt agreed to cease making lever-action rifles; both companies foresaw that entering into a corporate "war" to compete with one another could get ugly and expensive. While there is no documentation to prove this, it is widely believed the two companies entered into a gentlemen's agreement where they would limit themselves to their respective areas of expertise - Colt would stick to making revolvers and Winchester to rifles - which is why there were almost no Colt rifles prior to the 20th century, and no Winchester revolvers.

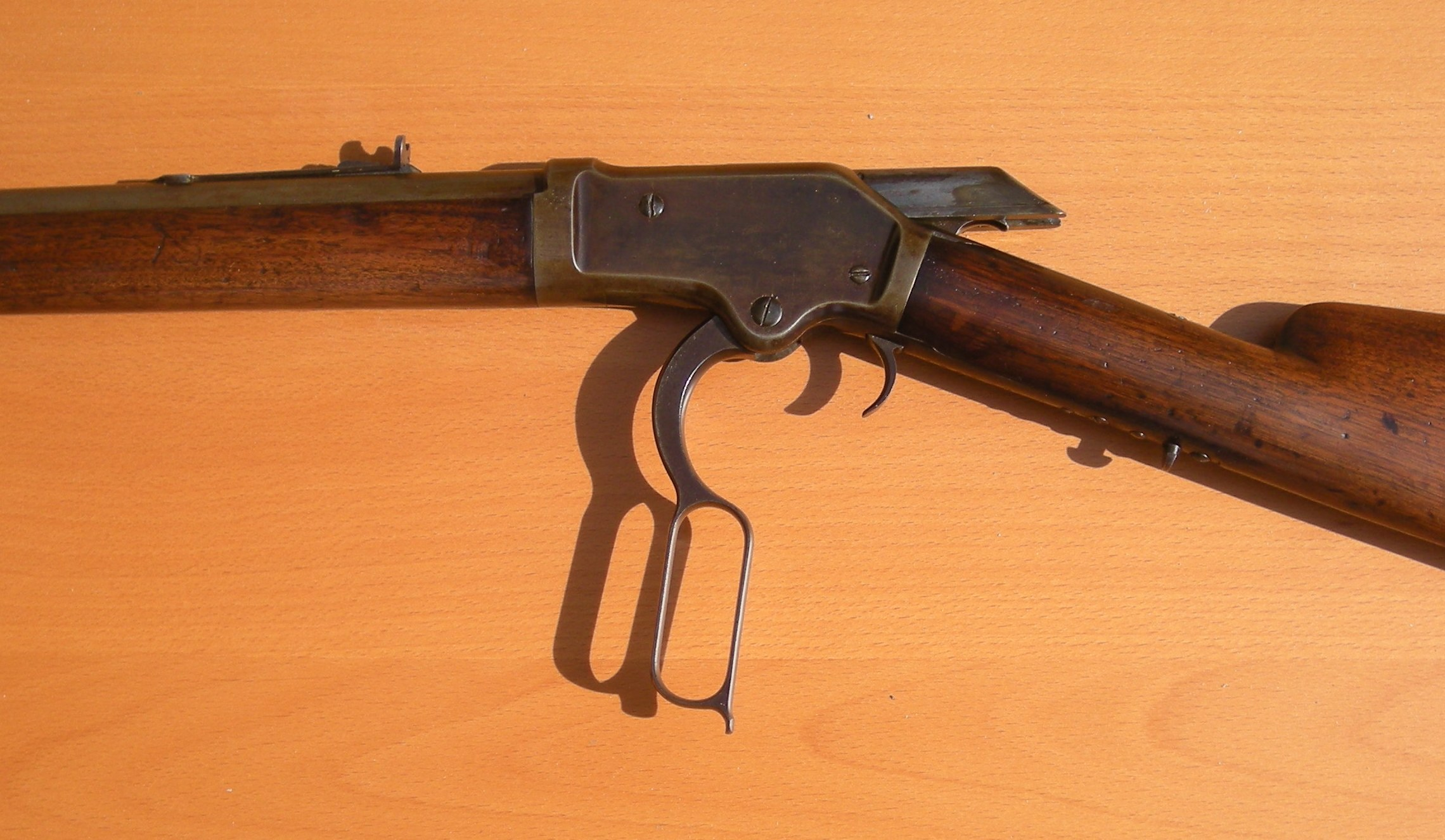
Colt-Burgess rifle

=== Marlin 1881/1893/336 ===
John Marlin, founder of the Marlin Firearms Company, introduced the Marlin Model 1881 as the company's first lever-action repeating rifle, and the first lever-action rifle designed to fire the powerful .45-70 Government cartridge originally designed in 1873 by the U.S. Army for use in the Springfield Model 1873, which would become one of the most popular big-game hunting cartridges in the world, and is still in use today. The Model 1881 was also offered in .38-55 Winchester. The Model 1881 was developed into the Model 1893, and was designed to handle higher pressure loads in anticipation of smokeless powder becoming the standard. The Model 1893 was also the first side-ejecting lever action, a key selling point over Winchester since it better protected the internal workings from weather and debris. The Model 1893 is still in production in the 21st century as the Marlin 336, and it gave rise to the Marlin Model 1894, which is also still in production.

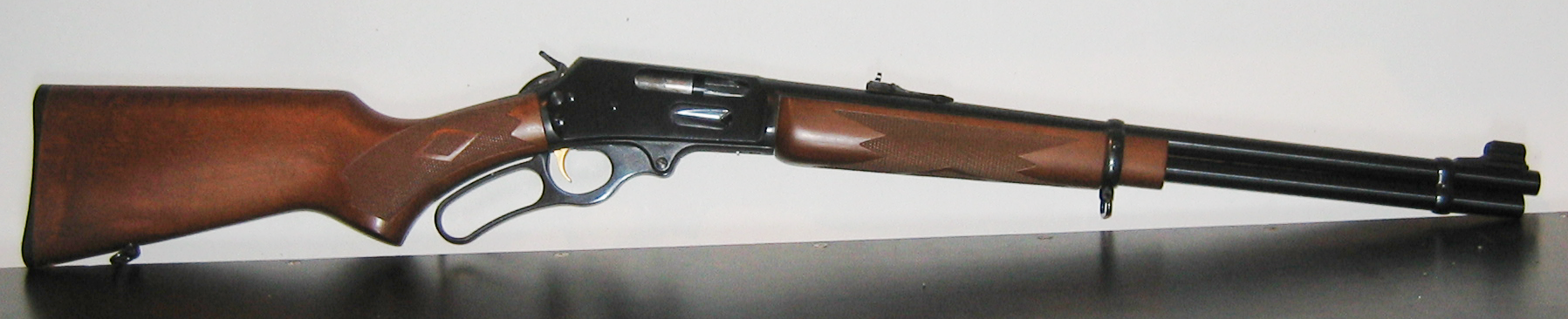
Marlin Model 336W

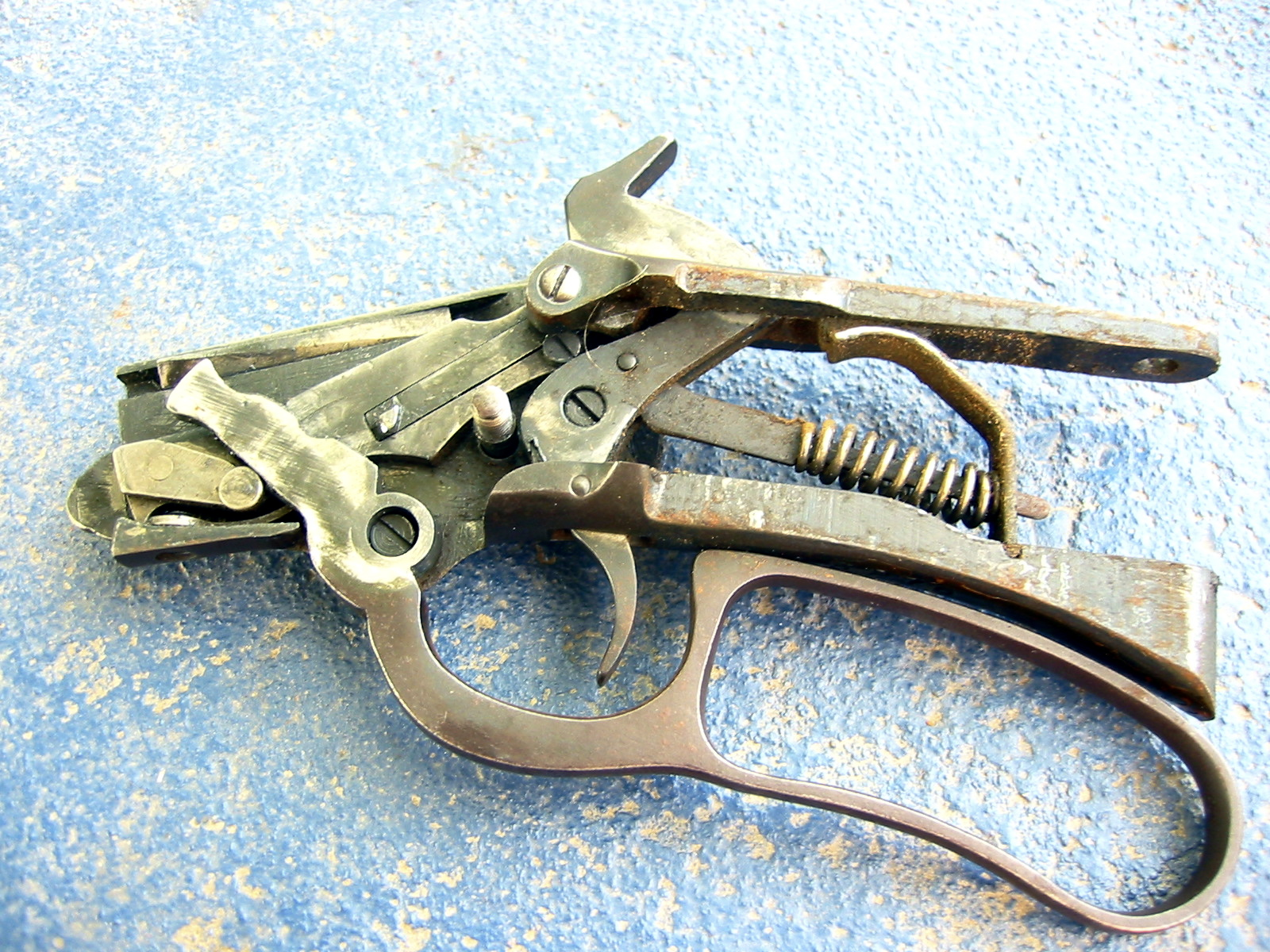
Mechanism of Marlin 39A receiver

=== Winchester 1894/94 ===
The Winchester Model 1894 (now called the Model 94) is arguably the most famous lever-action rifle in the world, the rifle has been in production for 132 years and is the best selling centerfire rifle in U.S. history. Designed by John Moses Browning, the Model 1894 was the first lever-action rifle specifically designed to use smokeless powder cartridges. It was initially chambered for the .25-35 WCF and the .30 WCF; the .30 Winchester came to be known as the .30-30 Winchester, the most popular lever-action rifle cartridge in the world. The Model 94 is credited with taking more game animals in North America than any other rifle. The Model 94 is/was offered in a number of other chamberings including .32 Winchester Special, .35 Winchester, .375 Winchester, .357 Magnum, .44 Remington Magnum, and .45 Colt to name a few. To better withstand the higher pressures of smokeless powder, the Model 1894 was designed with a new nickel-steel alloy barrel. Other major design improvements included a new safety feature involving a thick, solid-steel rod that slides up in front of the hammer while the bolt is being closed to prevent accidental discharge. A unique feature to the Model 1894 is a hinged floor plate in the receiver that pivots down when the action is opened, allowing easier access to the gun's internal mechanisms. The Model 1894's wider lever handle allowed it to be used more easily while wearing gloves, leading it to become the carbine of choice during the Alaskan Gold Rush of 1897, resulting in the Winchester 94 being christened “The Klondike Model”. This is credited with the Model 94 becoming thought of as the north woods deer camp rifle, the rifle to carry in a scabbard while riding on horseback and being commonly found in many a pickup truck’s rear window gun rack during hunting season. The Model 94 also became a very popular rifle with law enforcement during the early 20th century, it was used by a number of law enforcement agencies including Railroad Police like the North West Railroad Police, it was also used by the Texas Rangers and New York State Troopers. The Model 94 was the first sporting gun to sell more than one million units, the one millionth Model 94 was presented in 1927 to President Calvin Coolidge, and as of 2019 some 7.5 million Model 94's had been produced.

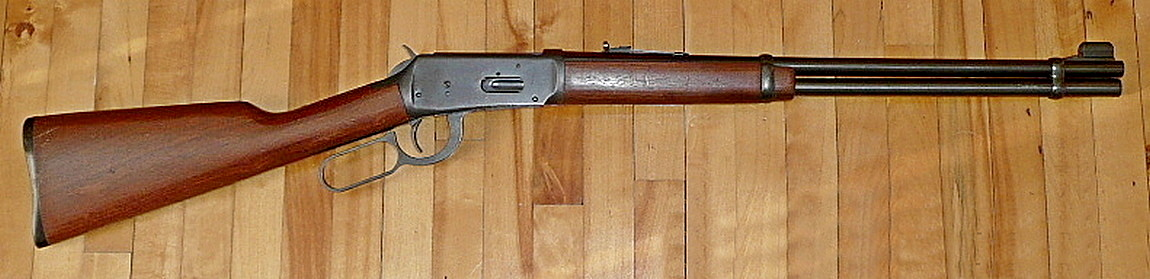
Winchester Model 94 .32 Winchester

=== Savage 1895/1899/99 ===
The Savage Model 1895 was designed and patented in 1893 by Arthur Savage, who also founded the Savage Arms Company in 1894. Entering production in 1895, Savage's rifle had a few revolutionary design changes over prior lever actions'. The Model 1895 was one of the first rifles designed to use smokeless powder, and it was the first lever-action rifle designed to use a bottlenecked cartridge with a pointed (spitzer) bullet. The Model 1895 used Savage's new .303 Savage, a bottlenecked cartridge that was designed to take advantage of the increased pressures of smokeless powder, it also used a pointed spitzer-style bullet. Pointed bullets have the advantage of having better accuracy and penetration, however they were not used in lever-action rifles with traditional tubular magazines because of safety issues: a cartridge in the magazine sits nose-to-base with the one in front of it, the recoil of the rifle being fired can possibly (however unlikely) cause the bullet's point to act like a firing pin and set the round in front of it off; this is why lever-action rifles traditionally use round-nose bullets. Arthur Savage solved this problem by designing the Model 1895 with a rotary spool magazine, in this style of magazine the rounds sit next to each other in a cylindrical sprocket, instead of end-to-end. The Model 1895 was also revolutionary for being the first successful, truly hammerless lever-action rifle. The Model 1895 evolved into the Model 1899, then the Model 99, and was in production from 1895-1997. It was one of the most successful hunting rifles in history, with one million rifles being sold by 1960.

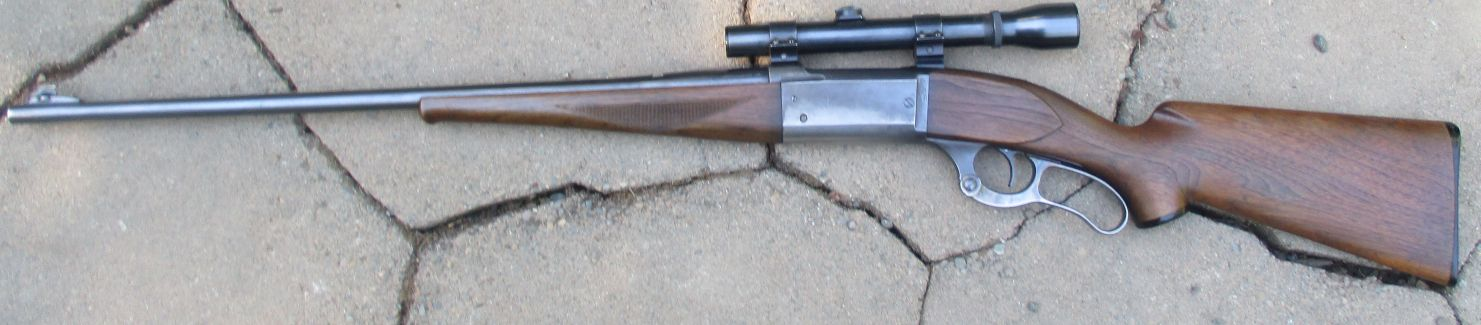
Savage Model 99 rifle

=== Other Examples ===
==== Early Lever-action Pistol ====
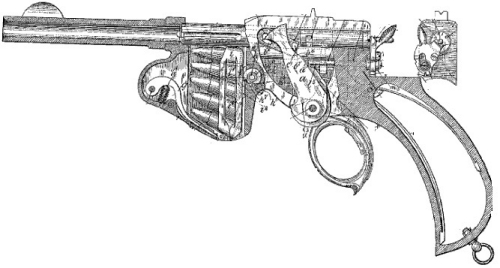
Laumann 1891 ring lever pistol

The Rudolf Oesterreich 1881 was an Austrian lever action pistol with an underbarrel tube magazine that ejected the spent cartridges rearwards when reloading. Similar firearms such as the Joseph Schulhof 1884 and a design by Franz Passer and Ferdinand Seidl in 1887. Paul Mauser proposed a pistol and carbine using a similar operation.

==== Ruger ====
Ruger, a brand synonymous with high quality revolvers like the single-action Ruger Blackhawk & double-action Ruger GP100, falling-block rifles like the Ruger No.1, and autoloading rifles like the Ruger 10/22, Ruger Mini-14, and Ruger AR-556, also produced lever action rifles for a short-time. From 1996-2009, they produced the Ruger Model 96, a hammerless short-throw lever-action rifle chambered in .17 HMR, .22 LR, .22 Magnum, and .44 Remington Magnum. Although Ruger re-entered the lever gun industry when they purchased Marlin Firearms in November, 2020. The first Ruger-made Marlin lever-action was the Marlin Model 1895 SBL chambered in .45-70, which became famous as the rifle used by Chris Pratt in the film Jurassic World.

== Use in warfare ==
=== American Civil War ===
Henry and Spencer rifles were used in the American Civil War; the Henry was credited with giving the Union Army a number of victories due to its rapid and highly accurate fire. Major William Ludlow stated after the Battle of Allatoona Pass: "What saved us that day was the fact that we had a number of Henry rifles. This company of 16 shooters sprang to the parapet and poured out such a multiplied, rapid and deadly fire, that no men could stand in front of it and no serious effort was made thereafter to take the fort by assault.” The Henry's comparatively high magazine capacity of 16 rounds made the rifle infamous with the Confederates, most of whom were still using single-shot muskets, with them calling the Henry "That damned Yankee rifle you can load on Monday, and shoot 'til Sunday".

=== Franco-Prussian War ===
Being impressed with the Henry Rifle's performance in the American Civil War, in 1868 the French Navy was considering adopting the Winchester Model 1866 as a rifle that could be used by sailors manning the crow's nest to lay rapid fire down on the decks of enemy ships. However, the final contract negotiations were interrupted by the outbreak of the Franco-Prussian War in 1870. The Model 1866 was never officially adopted by France, however they purchased 6,000 Model 1866 rifles: 3,000 musket versions with 27 in (690 mm) barrels & a 16-round magazine capacity and 3,000 carbine versions with 20 in (510 mm) barrels & a 13-round magazine capacity; 4.5 million rounds of .44 Henry ammunition were included in the purchase. The Winchester 1866 became the only foreign rifle to be retained in France after the war, and became the standard rifle for the gendarmes of the Corsican 17th Legion.

=== Russo-Turkish War ===
The Ottoman Empire purchased 45,000 musket and 5,000 carbine versions of the Winchester Model 1866 in 1870 and 1871. These rifles were used against Imperial Russia during the Russo-Turkish War of 1877 to great effect, the Russian army suffered tremendous losses when it attacked the Ottomans, in part due to the Winchester 1866. This brought the Winchester lever-action rifle to Russia's notice, and is part of the reason they later purchased a large number of them during the early years of World War I.

=== Spanish-American War ===
The Winchester Model 1895, Winchester's first lever-action rifle to use an internal clip-fed box magazine, was used by some of the Rough Riders during the Spanish-American War in 1898. While the primary rifle of the U.S. Army at the time was the Springfield Model 1892, the military designation for the bolt-action Krag–Jørgensen rifle, Winchester Model 1895s were issued to some troops due to a shortage of the Krag rifles. The 1895 was chosen because it was available in several cartridges being used by the military including the .30 Army, .30-30 Winchester, & .303 British, and was loaded the same way the M1892 was. Colonel Theodore Roosevelt carried a Winchester Model 1895 chambered in .30 Army while leading the Rough Riders.

=== World War I ===
==== Great Britain ====
During World War I the British Empire purchased three models of Winchester rifle: the Model 1886, Model 1892, and Model 1894. The Royal Flying Corps purchased 50 Model 1886 Winchesters chambered in .45-90, and used specially developed incendiary bullets designed to ignite the hydrogen gas in German airships and balloons. With the Lee–Enfield rifle being badly needed on the front lines, the Royal Navy purchased 20,000 Model 1892 rifles in .44-40 Winchester and 5,000 Model 1894 carbines in .30 WCF to be used for shipboard guard duty and mine clearing.

==== France ====
With the Model 1886 Lebel being prioritized for front-line French troops, the French Army contracted with Winchester and Remington to arm rear-echelon soldiers. France purchased 15,100 Model 1894 carbines with a special metric version of Winchester’s No.44A rear sight, which were issued to motorcycle couriers, artillery troops, transport units, balloon units, and airmen.

==== Imperial Russia ====
Some 293,816 lever-action Winchester Model 1895 rifles were sold to the Russian Empire during World War I. The primary infantry rifle of the Russian Army at the time was the Mosin-Nagant, chambered in 7.62x54mmR, however the Russian Army was so large it did not have enough equipment for its troops, nearly a third didn't even have firearms. To solve this, Russia turned to the then-neutral United States to acquire additional rifles, contracting Westinghouse and Remington to manufacture additional Mosin rifles, however they were unable to produce the number of rifles needed. To supplement this, Russia also contracted Winchester to make nearly 300,000 musket versions of the Winchester Model 1895, as it was relatively easy to convert it from a sporting configuration to a military one. The rifle was re-chambered in 7.62x54mmR since the action was strong enough to handle the stout round, the barrel length was increased to 30 in (760 mm) with a bayonet lug added to the end, and a charging bar was added to the bolt to allow for rapid clip reloading. The Winchester Muskets were largely issued to Russian units in the western provinces of Finland, Poland and Latvia.

==== Imperial Germany (trials only) ====
In 1912, the German Army procured test quantities of Winchester Model 1895 carbines for evaluation by the Uhlan 17th Saxon Lancer Regiment and the South West African Schutztruppe. Approximately 8,000 carbines were reportedly acquired for these trials. However, the lever-action design was not subsequently adopted as a replacement for their standard Mauser carbines, and consequently, these weapons did not become a component of the World War I battlefield inventory.

=== World War II ===
During World War I and World War II, due to battle rifles like the M1903 Springfield and the M1 Garand being badly needed overseas, approximately 1,800 special ordinance-marked Winchester Model 94 carbines were issued to troops stationed along the Canada–United States border and Mexico–United States border, National Guard home guard troops, and members of the Army Signal Corps.

=== Spanish Civil War ===
Lever-action rifles were used extensively during the 1930s by irregular forces in the Spanish Civil War. Most of which were Winchester or Winchester copies of Spanish manufacture, such as the El Tigre, a Spanish copy of the Winchester Model 1892. At least 9,000 Russian Winchester Model 1895 Muskets, marked with a flaming bomb and MP8 cartouche in the stock, were provided by the Soviet Union in 1936 to the Spanish Republicans for use in the Spanish Civil War. These were the same rifles the Russian Empire had used in World War I, following the Bolshevik Revolution and the formation of the Soviet Union they were put in storage, where they remained until Russia decided to support the Spanish Republicans. Due to the arms embargo the Spanish Republicans had difficulty acquiring weapons, so Stalin decided to sell some of Russia's excess arms, including a lot of obsolete firearms, in exchange for Spanish gold, with the Model 1895's being sold for many times their original purchase price.

== Shotguns ==
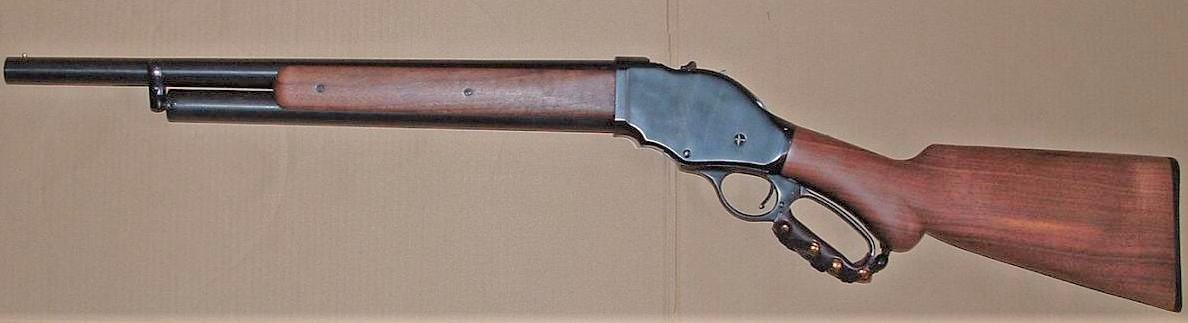
A modern reproduction of the Winchester Model 1887 lever-action shotgun

Early attempts at repeating shotguns invariably centered around either bolt-action or lever-action designs, drawing obvious inspiration from the repeating rifles of the time. The earliest successful repeating shotgun was the lever-action Winchester Model 1887, designed by John Browning in 1885 at the behest of the Winchester Repeating Arms Company. The lever-action design was chosen for reasons of brand recognition despite the protestations of Browning, who pointed out that a slide-action design would be much better for a shotgun. Initially chambered for black powder shotgun shells (as was standard at the time), the Model 1887 gave rise to the Winchester Model 1901, a strengthened version chambered for 10 gauge smokeless powder shells. Their popularity waned after the introduction of slide-action shotguns such as the Winchester Model 1897, and production was discontinued in 1920. Modern reproductions are manufactured by Armi Chiappa in Italy, Norinco in China, ADI Ltd. in Australia, and Century Arms in Florida. Winchester continued to manufacture the .410 bore Winchester Model 1894 (Model 9410) from 2003 until 2006.

Australian firearm laws strictly control pump-action shotguns and semi-automatic actions (Category C, D & R). Lever-action operation falls into a more lenient category (Category A & B), which has led to an increase in popularity of lever action shotguns.

== Other applications ==
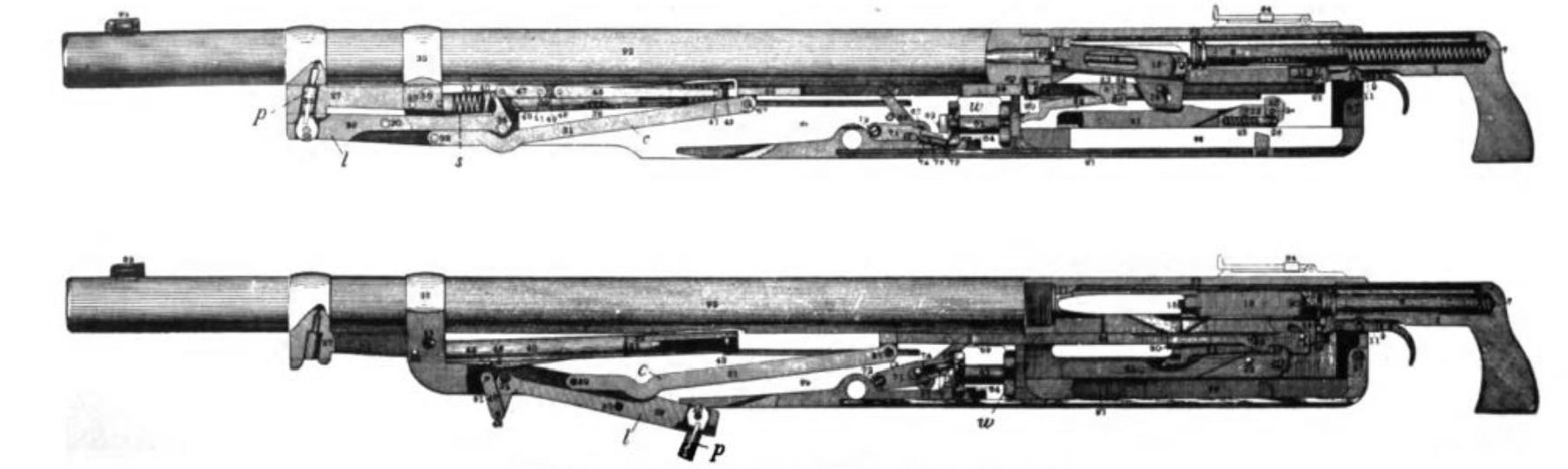
M1895 operating mechanism showing the lever in the forward (top) and rear (bottom) positions

A one-off example of lever-action reloading on automatic firearms is the M1895 Colt–Browning machine gun. In a typical lever-action design, the operating lever lies under the rear of the gun, below the stock, and is hinged near the breech area. It is operated by rotating the lever down and forward, which causes the breechblock to slide rearward away from the barrel and eject the spent round. The potato digger mechanism, in effect, bears some similarities to the basic lever action design; it uses a lever that is powered by the expanding gases that are propelling the bullet down the barrel, rather than the operator's hands. This unique operation gave the nickname "potato digger," as the lever swung each time the weapon fired and would dig into the ground if the weapon was not situated high enough on its mount. The M1895 was the first successful gas-operated machine gun to enter service in the United States Military.

== Lever-action Ammunition ==
The ammunition for lever-action rifles have a wide variety of calibers, bullet shapes, and powder loads. Lever-action cartridges and bullets fall into two categories: straight-wall or bottleneck, and the bullets in two categories: rounded bullets or aerodynamic pointed ("spitzer") bullets.

=== Cartridges ===
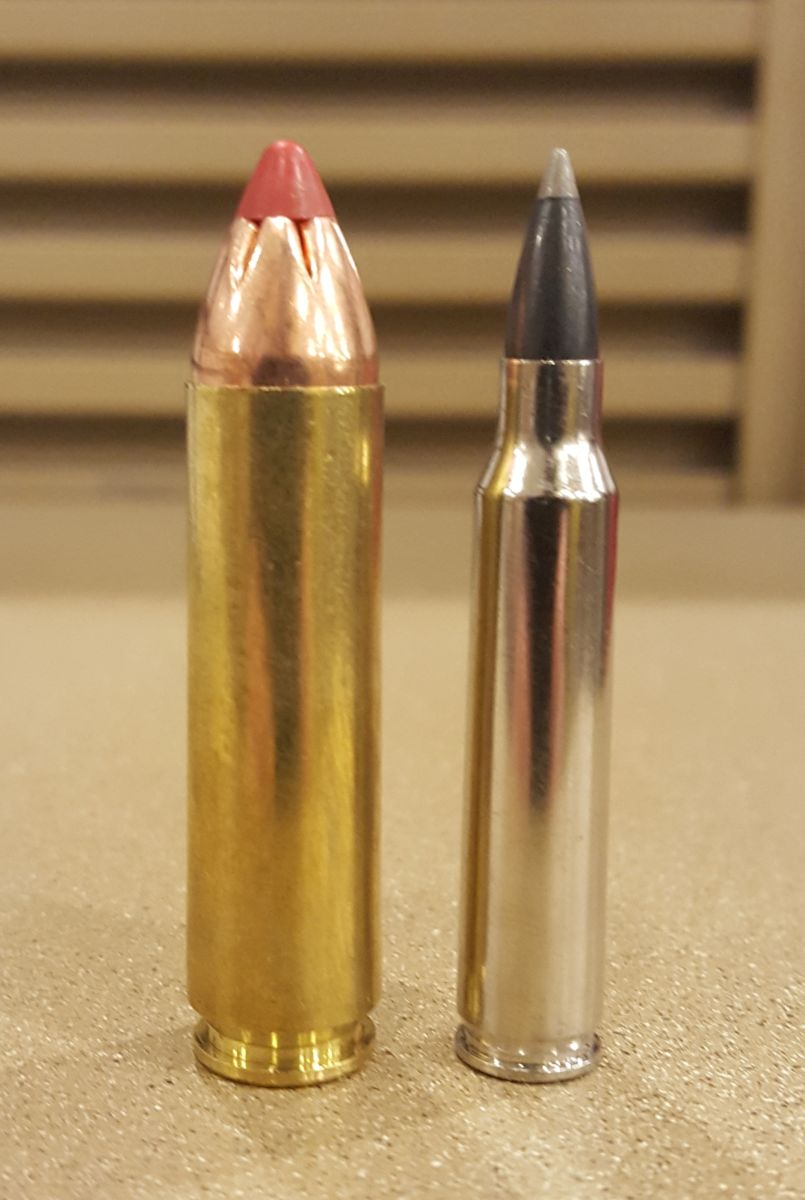
The .450 Bushmaster, a straight-walled hunting cartridge (left). And a .223 Remington, a bottlenecked hunting cartridge (right).

==== Straight-Wall ====
The first metallic cartridges made in the 1860s were known as straight-walled, meaning the case diameter was uniform from base to tip. Due to limitations in metallurgy, techniques to effectively crimp brass down and vary its diameter did not exist at the time, which is why all the early cartridges were straight-walled. Following the advent of bottleneck cartridges, straight-walled cartridges for rifles quickly became obsolete, although they remained the norm for most pistol cartridges, especially for revolvers. Although, due to changes in hunting regulations, straight-walled rifle cartridges started making a comeback in the early 2000s. Decades prior, a number of states with high population densities such as Indiana, Iowa, Illinois, Massachusetts, Michigan, New Jersey, Ohio, Rhode Island, and southern Minnesota began prohibiting the hunting of deer and other big game with rifles as they had seen an increase in people being hit by stray bullets during hunting season; in these states deer hunting was limited to archery, muzzleloaders, and shotguns loaded with buckshot or slugs. In Indiana, Iowa, Illinois, Michigan, and Ohio, laws began changing when it was realized straight-wall cartridges with larger caliber bullets have roughly the same range as a modern muzzleloader rifle or slug gun, thereby giving hunters a wider variety of long guns to choose from. The exact requirements in states that limit rifles to straight-wall cartridges vary, but in general straight-walled hunting cartridges must fire a bullet .357 inches (9.1 mm) in diameter or larger and have a minimum case length of 1.6 inches (41 mm); some states like Indiana also limit case length to a maximum of 1.8 inches (46 mm). This has led to a resurgence in the popularity of lever-action rifles, as straight-wall cartridges are most commonly shot out of lever-action rifles. Common straight-walled cartridges for lever-action rifles include .22 Long Rifle, .44-40 WCF, .45 Colt, .357 Magnum, .44 Remington Magnum, .38-40 Winchester, .38-55 Winchester, .444 Marlin, and .45-70 Government. While some of the newer straight-walled hunting cartridges developed recently are in bolt-action and semi-auto rifles like the .350 Legend, there are some available for lever guns such as the .360 Buckhammer and .450 Bushmaster.

==== Bottleneck ====
Bottleneck cartridges have been the most common type of rifle cartridge in general for over a century. A bottleneck cartridge features a wide case body that tapers at the shoulder to a narrower neck (like a soda bottle), allowing a much narrower bullet to be used while retaining a large amount of powder. The bottleneck design is conductive to higher pressures, instead of having a uniform case for gas to build up pressure and expand in, the gas is directed towards a narrow neck. As the gas is forced through the narrow neck, pressures become higher as the flow tightens and becomes more focused. These higher pressures allow for higher velocity, flatter trajectory, and greater accuracy at longer ranges compared to straight walled cartridges. Due to improvements in brass alloy that increased their strength, bottleneck cartridges emerged in the 1890s, possessing superior performance they quickly made straight wall cartridges obsolete for rifles in both military applications and hunting. Some of the first bottleneck cartridges for lever-action rifles were the .303 Savage and .30-30 Winchester, with the .30-30 still being widely used for over a century; other common lever-action bottleneck rounds include the .35 Remington, .348 Winchester, & .308 Marlin Express. There are also bottleneck rounds that were originally created for semi-automatic rifles like the AR-15 which lever-action rifles are being chambered for, like the .223 Remington and the .300 Blackout, as these rounds are also popular for hunting varmint and medium-sized game.

=== Bullets ===
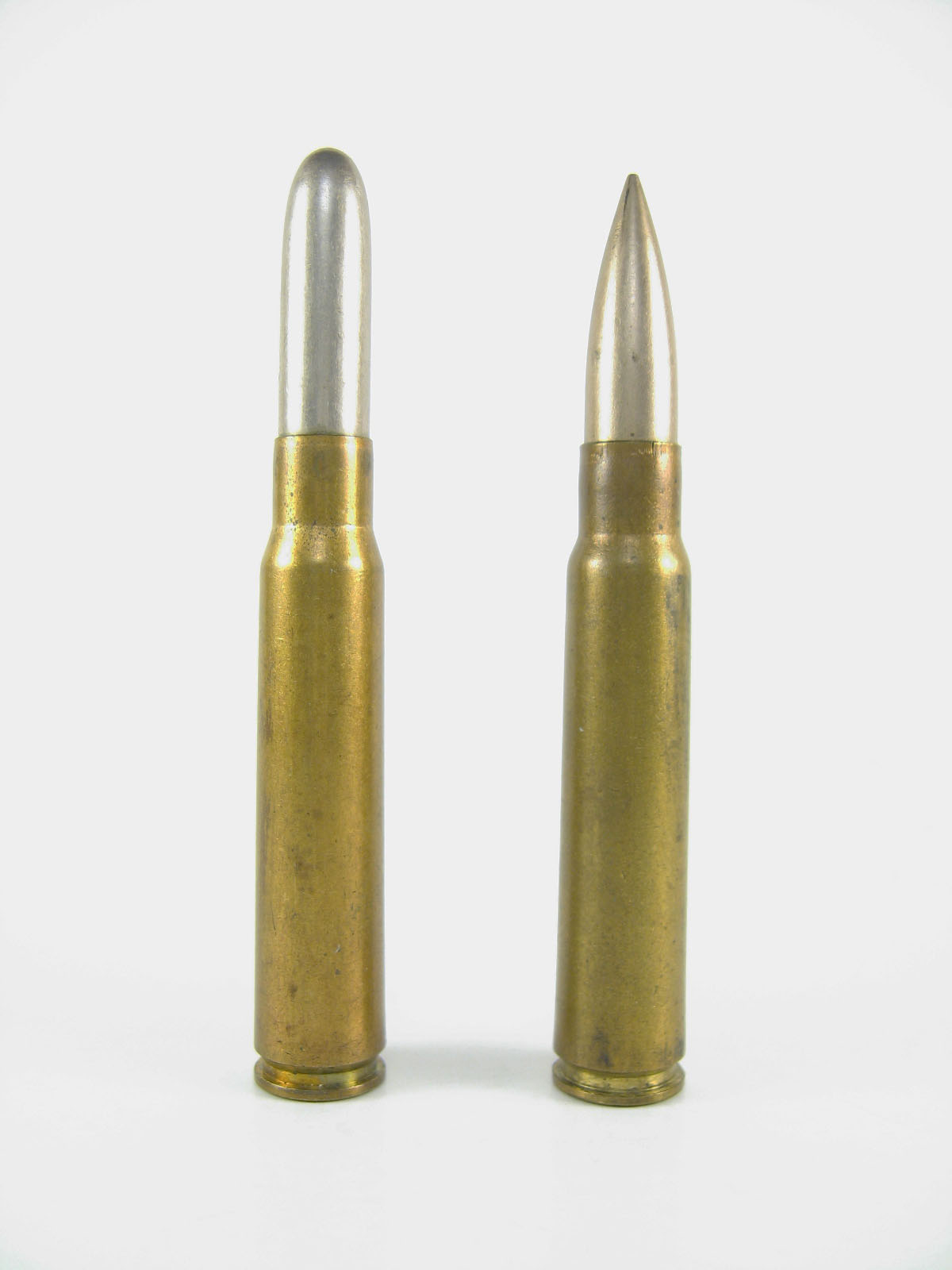
7.92×57mm Mauser, which is available with both blunted and pointed spitzer bullets

==== Blunt ====
Most cartridges designed for lever-action rifles use rounded, or blunt, bullets as a safety measure, as in a tubular magazine cartridges sit nose-to-base with the one in front of it, the recoil of the rifle being fired can potentially cause a pointed bullet to act like a firing pin and set the round in front of it off. A related problem is that the lead tips on pointed bullets are soft and can be damaged in a tubular magazine, deforming the tip and reducing accuracy. Blunted bullets while often slower due to their non-aerodynamic shape, are often larger with significant mass. This mass contributes to its momentum, which in turn affects its ability to transfer energy to a target. While blunted bullets may have less penetration, they are able to transfer much more energy to a target, known as "knockdown power", higher energy transfer can cause more significant tissue damage. Blunted bullets deliver energy more efficiently, creating larger wound cavitation compared to pointed bullets. This is why self-defense ammunition commonly use blunted bullets like soft-points and hollow-points.

==== Pointed ====
Pointed bullets, or spitzer from the German word spitzgeschuss – literally “pointed shot (bullet)”, have an aerodynamically pointed nose shape, called a spire point. Pointed bullets have the advantage of being more aerodynamic, encountering less air resistance than a round-nose bullet. This gives them significantly better accuracy, velocity, and range. They are also capable of penetrating targets more deeply, and are better at penetrating barriers like clothing, walls, or armor. Although as previously mentioned, they are not used in lever-action rifles as much due to their issues with tubular magazines. Although some lever-action rifles such as the Savage Model 99 and Winchester Model 1895 can be fed from either box or rotary magazines, negating this issue. More recently, spitzer bullets with soft elastomer tips have been developed by companies like Hornady, which are safe to use in tubular magazines and feature higher ballistic coefficients and deliver flatter trajectory compared to blunt bullets.

==== Other ====
Lever-action designs with strong, rotary locking bolts like the Browning BLR can safely use very high-powered cartridges that aren't usually practical to use in lever-action rifles. The Browning BLR is chambered for a number of cartridges usually seen in bolt-action rifles including .223 Remington, .243 Winchester, .270 Winchester, .308 Winchester, .30-06 Springfield, .270 Winchester Short Magnum, 7mm Winchester Short Magnum, .300 Winchester Short Magnum, 7mm Remington Magnum, and .300 Winchester Magnum; the BLR's detachable box magazine also allows it to use the standard pointed ammunition for these calibers. Tilting block designs such as the Savage Model 99 are also strong enough to handle much higher chamber pressures.

Lever-action shotguns such as the Winchester Model 1887 are chambered in 10 or 12 gauge black powder shotgun shells, whereas the Model 1901 is chambered for 10-gauge smokeless shotshells. Modern reproductions are chambered for 12 gauge smokeless shells, while the Winchester Model 9410 shotgun is available in .410 bore.

== Comparison to bolt-action rifles ==
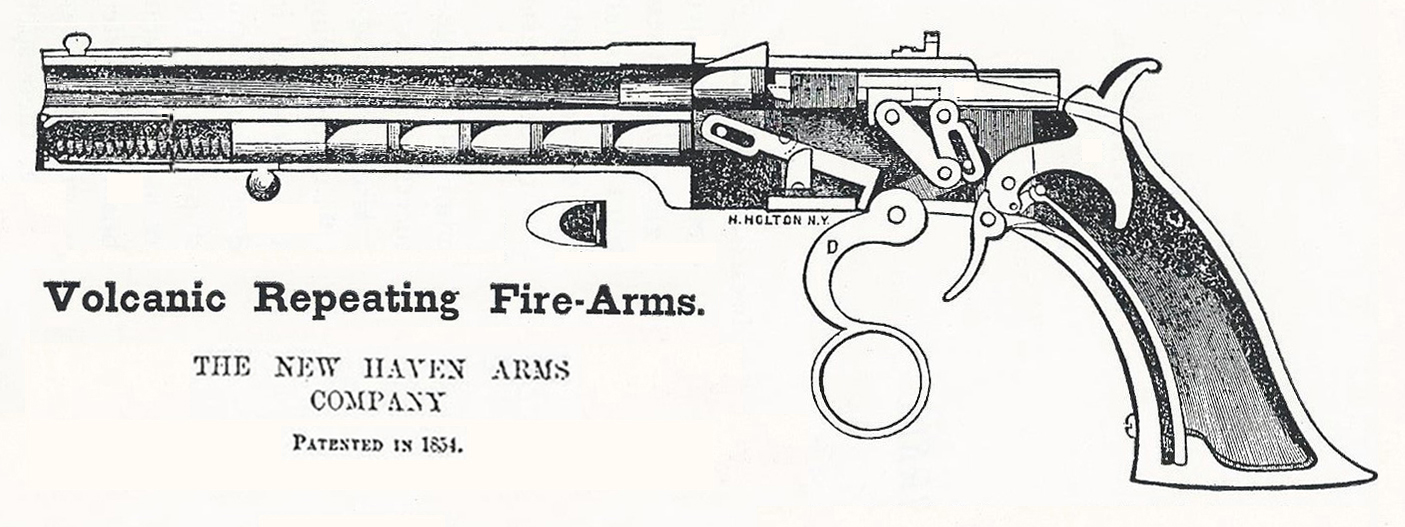
Diagram showing the anatomy of a Volcanic handgun.

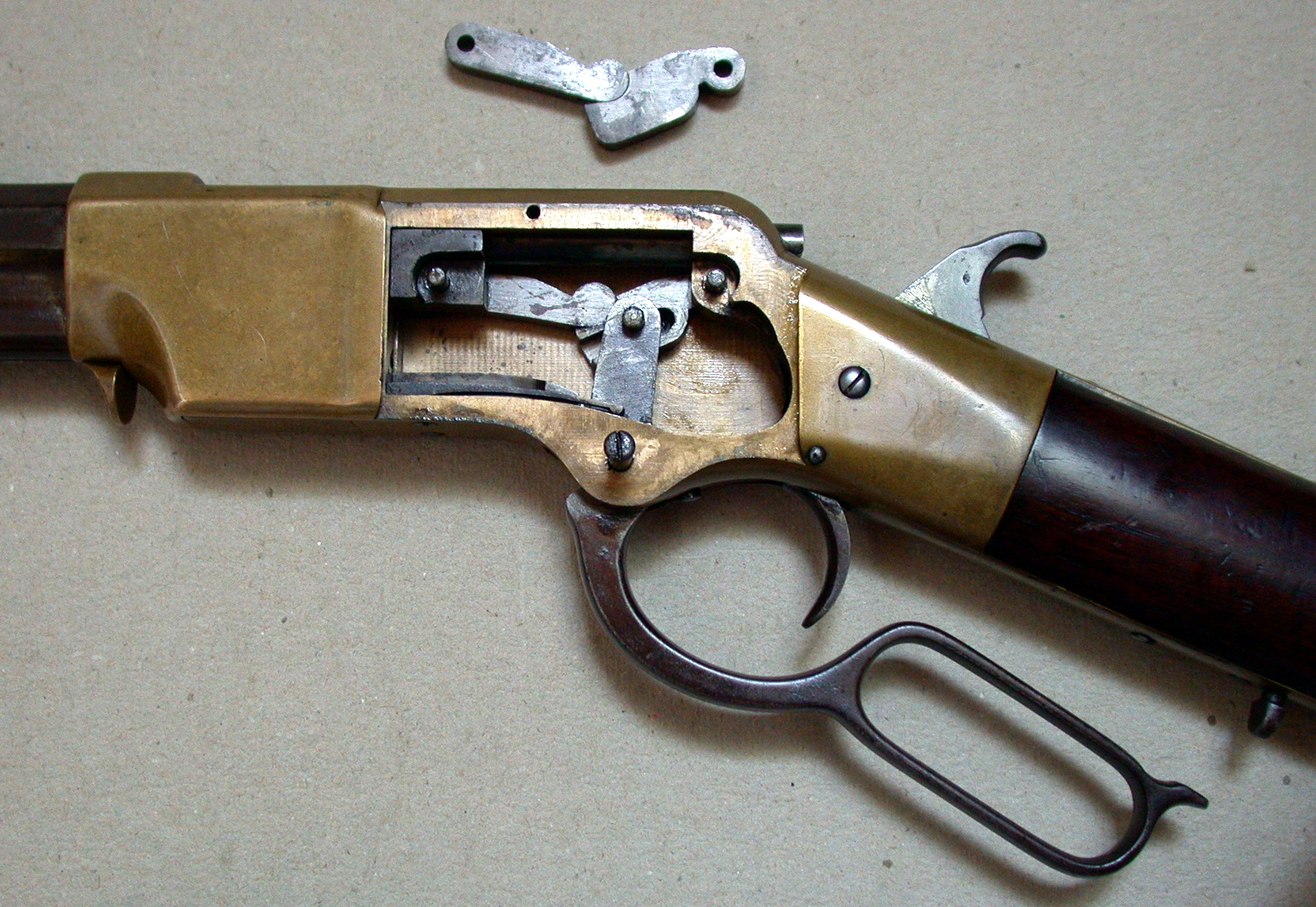
Henry rifle, toggle-lock

Lever-action rifles have always been popular with hunters and sporting shooters, and while they saw some military use, they quickly fell out of widespread military use with the advent of bolt-action rifles. The first bolt-action rifle to be officially adopted as a standard-issue rifle by the U.S. military was the Springfield Model 1892 in 1892, after which lever-action rifles were quickly relegated to use by rear echelon troops.

=== Lever-action Advantages ===
==== Size ====
One of the primary advantages a lever-action rifle has over a bolt-action is they are a smaller, lighter gun in general. The components of their action are lightweight, the rifle's overall profile is narrower, and they typically have shorter barrels and better balance, allowing them to be raised (or "snapped") to the shoulder more quickly. This makes lever-actions more suited to being a "brush gun" for hunting and hiking in thick brush, and compact enough to be kept in a pickup trucks' gun rack or a saddle's scabbard.

==== Capacity & Rate-of-fire ====
On average, lever-action rifles have a larger magazine capacity and rate of fire compared to a bolt-action. Lever-action rifles typically have a magazine capacity of 6-11 rounds, while most bolt-action rifles (especially ones with fixed magazines) are limited to 3-5 rounds, depending on caliber. Lever-action rifles chambered in .30-30 Winchester typically have a 5+1 capacity (five rounds in the magazine plus one in the chamber) for carbine-length rifles, and a 6+1 capacity for sporting-rifle length. Lever-action rifles chambered for revolver cartridges usually have a 7+1 capacity for .44 Magnum, 10+1 for .357 Magnum, and 15+1 for .22 Long Rifle. With many models of lever-action having a side-loading gate, they can also be easily reloaded in between shots, known as "topping off", a technique often used with shots in combat and competition.

Thanks to the lever action being easy, quick, and intuitive to use, a lever-action rifle often has a higher rate of fire compared to a bolt-action. The lever can also be quickly cycled while the stock is kept in place against the shoulder, allowing for more rapid and accurate follow-up shots. In the hands of an experienced shooter, a lever-action can even come close to matching the fire rate of a semi-automatic rifle. Additionally, another advantage over typical bolt-action rifles is the lack of handedness: lever-action rifles, with similarities to pump-action shotguns, make excellent ambidextrous firearms, since the lever and hammer can be used with either hand.

=== Lever-action Disadvantages ===
==== Design & Function ====
Relative to a bolt action, the lever action has a fairly complicated design. The lever action has a lot more moving parts, making the gun a lot more complicated to disassemble and field strip for thorough cleaning. A lot of modern lever-actions have additional safety features required by some jurisdictions, making them even more complex to disassemble. For example, Winchester Model 94s manufactured between 1992 - 2002 have a cross-bolt safety that prevents the hammer from falling forward when engaged, and models made after 2002 have a tang safety that immobilizes the trigger when engaged; both of these make disassembly more complex. Having more moving parts also increases the chances of something breaking or jamming, and can make lever-actions less tolerant to bad weather or dirty, grimy conditions. This also makes lever-action rifles more expensive to manufacture, bolt-action rifles being cheaper and easier to mass produce was a major contributing factor in the military discontinuing their use. By the late 19th century, militaries worldwide had invested in cheap bolt-action rifles and were unwilling to invest in producing more expensive lever-action rifles.

The majority of lever-action rifles using tubular magazines has historically limited the kind of ammunition they can safely use, with tubular magazine-safe pointed bullets only becoming recently available in the last decade or so. Lever action bolts were designed to use rimmed cartridges, which limits the calibers the rifle can be chambered for, with only select models working with other cartridge types. A lever-action is also slower to fully reload from empty than many bolt-actions, which can be quickly reloaded with a stripper clip, with many modern bolt-actions making use of detachable box magazines.

From a military perspective, and hunting as well, lever-action rifles are harder to fire from the prone position, as the ground can prevent the lever from being able to fully open.

=== Bolt-action Advantages ===
==== Accuracy ====
The main advantage of a bolt-action rifle over a lever-action, or any action for that matter, is accuracy. Bolt-action rifles have solid receivers and chambers, which the bolt firmly locks into using locking lugs, this ensures that when the rifle is fired there are no moving parts, other than the trigger and the firing pin. This allows a bolt action to have tighter mechanical tolerances, allowing the bolt to have a more consistent lockup. Bolt-action rifles can also have a free-floating barrel, which is where the barrel isn't in contact with the stock, this can greatly increase long-range accuracy; in lever action-rifles the barrel is in contact with both the stock and magazine tube, this changes the barrel's harmonics which can impact bullet trajectory at long-range. Bolt-action rifles are also much more compatible with mounting a scope, most models come with scope mounting holes pre-drilled, which substantially increases long-range accuracy. While scopes can also be mounted to a lever-action, it can be more problematic since a lot of lever-action rifles are top ejecting, and most lever-actions have a shorter barrel, reducing the effectiveness of a scope. A bolt-action provides a stable, solid platform for mounting a scope, and their longer barrels make better use of a scope's accuracy.

==== Design ====
The locking lugs on a rotating bolt give the action substantially more durability and strength, allowing it to handle much higher pressure loads than the average lever-action can. Because of the versatility of their bolt designs, bolt-action rifles are available in a wide variety of calibers, as they are compatible with both rimmed and rimless cartridges, allowing a bolt-action to fire anything from rimmed cartridges like the small .22 Long Rifle to the powerful 7.62×54mmR; or rimless calibers ranging from the small .223 Remington to magnum rounds like the .300 Winchester Magnum, powerful sniper rounds like the .338 Lapua Magnum & .416 Barrett, and extremely powerful anti-material cartridges like the .50 BMG and 20mm Anzio rifle.

=== Bolt-action Disadvantages ===
Bolt-action rifles typically can't be fired as fast as a lever-action, and unless shooting prone it is difficult to cycle the bolt while keeping the rifle shouldered, making quick follow-up shots more difficult. Many models with fixed magazines have limited ammunition capacity, with .22-.27 caliber rifles typically having a capacity of 5+1, .30 caliber rifles are usually 4+1, and .30 caliber plus magnums being 3+1. Although it is getting more common for bolt action rifles to be made with detachable magazines, like the Ruger American Ranch Rifle which comes with a 10-round AR-style magazine, but is compatible with any STANAG magazine including 20, 30, & 40-round sizes, and is available in 5.56x45mm, .300 Blackout, 7.62x39mm, .350 Legend, 6mm ARC, .308 Win and .450 Bushmaster. Compared to lever-action rifles, bolt-actions are typically heavier, have longer barrels, and are more difficult to carry for long distances.

== Modern Tactical Lever Gun ==
Lever-action rifles have also been making a comeback in the tactical and competition shooting communities, and are once again becoming popular for home defense, especially in jurisdictions with bans on semi-automatic sporting rifles like the AR-15 and magazine capacity limit bans and as a way to get around laws banning "assault weapon" accessories like pistol grips and muzzle breaks, since those restrictions usually only apply to semi-automatic rifles. A couple examples are the Marlin Dark Series Model 1895, Smith & Wesson Model 1854 Stealth, and the Henry H12 X Model. The Henry and S&W are offered in .45 Colt, .357 Magnum/.38 Special & .44 Magnum/.44 Special, the and the Marlin in .45-70 Government, with the Marlin being prominently featured in John Wick: Chapter 4. Both rifles come with M-LOK and Picatinny Rail accessory rails, and threaded barrels allowing for the attachment of muzzle devices like a muzzle break, flash hider, or a suppressor (silencer).

== Spin cocking ==
A quick reloading technique for lever-action firearms using a full rotation of the weapon with one hand. A similar example exists, flip cocking but this differs as the previously mentioned full rotation is not used.

== See also ==
- Antique guns
- Rapid fire crossbow
