= Savage 110 BA =

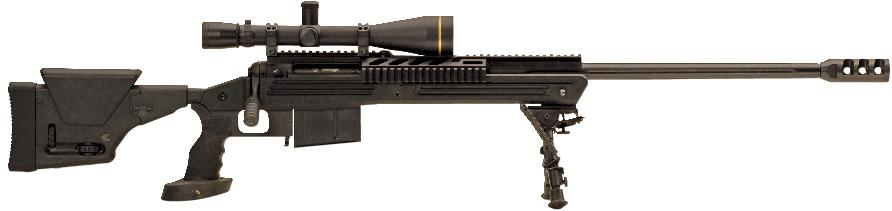
- Savage 110 BA
- Type: Sniper rifle
- Place of origin: United States

Production history
- Designed: 2009
- Manufacturer: Savage Arms
- Unit cost: US $2,638.00
- Produced: 2009-2015
- Variants: Savage 10 BAS-K, Savage Model 10 BAT/S-K

Specifications
- Mass: (15.75 lb)
- Length: (50.5 in)
- Barrel length: (26 in)/ (29.5 in) with muzzle brake
- Cartridge: .338 Lapua Magnum.300 Winchester Magnum
- Action: Bolt-action
- Effective firing range: 1,100 metres (1,203 yd) (.300 Winchester Magnum); 1,500 metres (1,640 yd) (.338 Lapua Magnum)
- Feed system: 5-round external box magazine (.338)/6-round external box magazine (.300)
- Sights: None but includes a picatinny 18" 6061 T6 rail system.

The Savage 110 BA is a bolt-action sniper/tactical rifle manufactured by Savage Arms. The rifle is designated with an "LE" code; "Law Enforcement". All 110 BA series rifles are configured with AccuTrigger, matte-blued barreled action, fluted heavy free-floating barrel, muzzle brake, oversized bolt handle, external box magazine (holding 5 - 6 rounds), magpul adjustable stock, adjustable pistol grip, and three swivel studs for sling and bipod mounting.

The Savage 110 BA is similar to the Savage Model 10 rifles (10 BAS-K and 10 BAT/S-K). Whereas the Model 10 rifles are short actions rifles the 110 BA uses a long action.

== Stock and grip ==
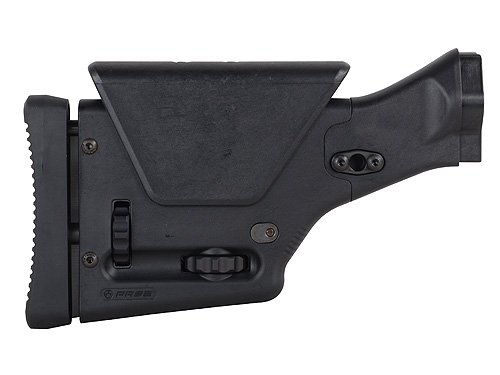
Close up of the 110 BA Magpul stock

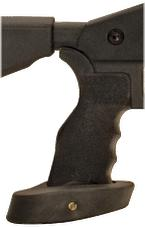
Close up of the 110 BA Pistol Grip

The 110 BA also comes stock with a Heckler & Koch PSG1 style pistol grip. The grip is a target-type grip that contains an adjustable palm shelf. A hex bolt rather than a rotating dial tightens or loosens the palm shelf. Loosening the bolt allows for the palm rest to move up and down to accommodate the shooter's hand size. Tightening the bolt locks the rest into a set position that is now customized to the shooter's hand size.

== Sights ==
The Savage 110 BA rifle is provided with pre-drilled holes for attachment of a Picatinny rail system, which the rifle comes with. The picatinny rail allows for a variety of add-ons. The rail is long enough to mount a scope towards the receiver end and can accommodate such devices as night vision in "front" of the scope. The rail system also has two side mounts for additional devices such as flashlights or laser sighting.

The lack of iron sights is because Savage expects users of this rifle to utilize telescopic sights as opposed to iron sights. Telescopic sights are not only more precise, but a "must" for the extreme long distances that this rifle is capable of achieving. A scope is not included because the choice of a particular scope can be a very personal selection that involves a shooter's particular taste, comfort, and opinion, which are all subjective. Factors that some shooters use to determine a particular scope are weight, magnification, size, clarity, and many other features.

== Trigger ==
The 110 BA comes with the Savage Arms developed "AccuTrigger". This trigger is intended to give a shooter the flexibility to set the trigger pull to their individual preference without having to pay a gunsmith to adjust it. The trigger can be adjusted from 6.5 to 26 N (1.5 to 6 lbf). Savage claims that even when adjusted to its lowest setting, the AccuTrigger is completely safe and cannot accidentally discharge during normal use from being jarred or dropped when maintained and adjusted as intended. The AccuTrigger offers a relatively short lock time of 1.6 milliseconds, favoring accurate shooting.

=== Adjustment ===
Savage claims the adjustment of the AccuTrigger is a simple process. Removal of the stock is necessary where rotation of an adjustment spring is required. This is accomplished using the Savage supplied tool. The AccuTrigger has a single adjustment location and is designed so it cannot be adjusted below the minimum setting. This adjustment feature is yet another example of the built-in customization design of this rifle. Customization allows users to adjust the rifle to their own personal comforts and preferences, which can equate to accuracy improvement.

== Heavy barrel ==
The 110 BA includes a fluted, heavy barrel that is free-floating, which provides high accuracy. Thicker barrels are generally stiffer and thus deflect less when a force is applied, such as when a forearm touches a barrel. A heavier barrel also tends to vibrate less when fired, thus sending bullets more consistently in the same direction. Their greater weight (within reason) makes it easier to hold the rifle steady. For all of these reasons, heavy barrels are generally more accurate than lighter barrels. The "flutes" are essentially grooves that are cut into the length of the barrel to help it dissipate heat. There are many arguments for and against fluted barrels, but whatever the take, Savage decided that fluting this barrel on the 110 BA was a good idea.

=== Free-floating ===
A free-floating barrel means that the barrel does not touch the stock that is connected to it except at the very end, near the receiver and bolt end, where it is attached. The advantage of this design is that there is less vibrational resonance. This means that as bullets are fired down the barrel, their energy is usually channeled down the edges of the barrel. If the barrel were touching the stock throughout its entire length, the energy traveling down the barrel would be transferred to the stock. This transference of energy to the stock would thus cause resonance, which results in the prolongation of vibrations by reflection. The effect of this is that the entire rifle tends to vibrate, which causes inaccuracy, as accuracy is a product of stability and not movement. A barrel that is free-floating thus eliminates these problems.

=== Muzzle brake ===
The 110 BA comes with a 89 mm (3.5" inch) muzzle brake that is threaded to a 5/8-24 UNEF-3A thread pitch, which equates to approximately 15.88×1.058 in metric terminology. Savage felt that a muzzle brake was essential in the rifle design as the .338 Lapua Magnum round generates recoil that most shooters find unpleasant. The muzzle brake has no bottom gills, forcing the expanding gases to channel up and out. This feature eliminates any "dust cloud" when firing from a prone position which would normally give away a shooter's position in a tactical situation. By channeling the expanding gases upward and backward muzzle rise and recoil is reduced by what Savage claims is 35 percent. Project designer Steve Danneker claims the 110 BA has felt recoil comparable to that of the .308 Winchester round.

=== Rate of twist ===
According to project designer Steve Danneker of Savage Arms, the rate of twist for the .338 Lapua Magnum was chosen to be 229 mm. Most rifles in this calibre use a 254 mm twist. A 229 mm twist allows a bullet to rotate along its center axis at a faster rate than a 254 mm twist. Faster rotation helps stabilize longer bullets at their maximum range. This allows new bullet designs such as the all-copper and Very-low-drag bullet (VLD)-style projectile to remain stable through the very long travel distance. Most bullets are not designed for the extreme ranges provided the .338 design; thus, a 254 mm twist is adequate.

The rifling rate of twist is:

- 229 mm, or 1 in 9", for all 110 BA .338 models
- 254 mm, or 1 in 10", for all 110 BA .300 models

== Magazine ==
Savage utilized the Accuracy International detachable five-round, single-stack box magazine for the 110 BA. This magazine box is utilized in their Accuracy International Arctic Warfare sniper rifle, but it is not the same magazine used in the Accuracy International AWM (Arctic Warfare Magnum) model. Utilizing an already existing box magazine facilitates the availability of extra magazines for shooters with 110 BA.

An important note on the 110 BA magazine is that it adheres to the .338 Lapua Magnum cartridges loaded to the C.I.P. (Commission Internationale Permanente pour l'Epreuve des Armes à Feu Portatives) maximum allowed overall length of 93.50 mm (3.681 in). It actually accepts up to a 95.50 mm (3.760 in) overall length round, though most factory ammunition doesn’t exceed 3.600 inches. This is an important distinction because some rifles chambered in .338 Lapua Magnum, such as the Accuracy International AWM, do not adhere to the CIP standard and thus do not function properly due to a lack of internal magazine length. The reason for this problem is that the AWSM bolt-action is not specifically designed for the fat and long .338 Lapua Magnum cartridge. Because of this, ammunition manufacturers produce .338 Lapua Magnum cartridges that are loaded short enough (≈ 91.44 mm / 3.600 in) to fit in the AWSM magazines. As long as .338 Lapua Magnum cartridges that will fit in the magazines are used, the AWSM rifles can be used as repeating rifles instead of single shot rifles.

== See also ==
- Designated marksman
- List of sniper rifles
- Savage 10FP
- Savage Model 110
- Sniper
