= Keppeler =

German firearms manufacturer

Keppeler – Technische Entwicklungen GmbH is a German firearms manufacturer which produces rifles for ISSF 300 m rifle competition, hunting matches as well as bullpup sniper rifles.

== History ==
Toolmaker Dieter Keppeler began working as a firearm designer at the Carl Walther factory in Ulm in 1958. Here he was involved in the development of the sniper rifle Walther WA 2000. In 1982, Dieter Keppeler established his first independent company "Dieter Keppeler - Waffentechnische Werkstatt" in Langenau to produce 300 m competition rifles. As early as in 1985 the German national team used rifles produced by Keppeler in the European Championships. In 1987 Keppeler left Carl Walther for good.

Bernhard Fritz was a well-known manufacturer of exclusive firearms for hunting, and had received his training at Ferlach in Austria, the only technical university for gunsmiths in Western Europe. Fritz also had a gunsmithing education from Freudenstadt, and while he was a student he won the German national gunsmithing championship. After becoming a certified craftsman in Ulm in 1979, he settled in Fichtenberg in Swabia in 1980 where he worked as an independent gunsmith and produced exclusive handmade hunting rifles. In 1991, Bernhard Fritz died in an accident.

In January 1992, Dieter Keppeler bought the company from Bernhard Fritz and moved his own company to Fichtenberg, where he went to produce hunting, competition and sniper rifles under the name Keppeler & Fritz GmbH. In 1999, the company changed its name to Keppeler Technische Entwicklungen GmbH. In 2004 Dieter Keppeler retired, and the company is today run by Gert Peter who has worked in the company since 1985.

== Models ==
Keppeler Freigewehre
Keppeler's match rifles are built for 300 m competitions, and are available with a 65 cm match barrel as the standard option, and described as having a short lock time. They are available in chamberings such as .223 Rem, 6 mm PPC, 6 mm BR, 6 mm XC, 6.5×47 mm Lapua, 7mm-08 and .308 Win.

Keppeler Hunting Match
The Hunting Match model is available in a long list of chamberings from .17 Rem to .300 Win Mag.

Keppeler KS V Bullpup
The KS V sniper rifle is available in .308 Win, .300 Win Mag and .338 LM.

== See also ==
- Bleiker
- Grünig + Elmiger AG
- Tanner Sportwaffen
