= Elmiger =

Elmiger is a Swiss-German surname. Notable people with the surname include:

- Dorothee Elmiger (born 1985), Swiss writer, translator and historian
- Martin Elmiger (born 1978), Swiss road racing cyclist

== See also ==
- Grünig + Elmiger, a Swiss firearms manufacturer
- Elmigera barbata, see Penstemon barbatus
