= Savage Model 110 =

Savage Arms Model 110
- Type: Bolt-action rifle
- Place of origin: United States

Production history
- Designer: Nicolas L. Brewer
- Designed: 1956
- Manufacturer: Savage Arms
- Produced: 1958—present
- Variants: 10/110FP "Law Enforcement", 11/111 "Hunter", 12 "Varmint", 14/114 "Classic", 16/116 "Weather Warrior", 210 "Slug Warrior"

Specifications
- Mass: Varies with model, ~7 lbs. (Model 111G)
- Barrel length: 20-26 inches (508-660 mm)
- Cartridge: Various
- Action: Repeating bolt-action
- Feed system: 2-4 rounds, internal or detachable box magazine, double-stack single-feed. Push feed or controlled feed (depending on model).
- Sights: None included; Drilled and tapped for scope mounts

The Savage Model 110 is a bolt-action repeating rifle made by Savage Arms. It was designed in 1958 by Nicholas L. Brewer. It was patented in 1963 and has been in continuous production since that time. The model variants included the first left-handed rifle to be made "in volume" by a major firearms manufacturer.

== History ==
The Model 110 was developed to give the hunters a strong and powerful yet light and affordable rifle. Its model number is derived from its initial retail price of $109.95. It was originally made for .30-06 Springfield and .270 Winchester ammunition. In 1959, a short-action version was introduced, chambered in .243 Winchester and .308 Winchester. That same year, the Model 110 was the first commercial bolt-action rifle sold in a left-handed configuration.

In 1966, the Model 110's design was altered to improve performance and reduce production costs. Changes included a new adjustable trigger and a new bolt with a plunger-type ejector passing through the bolt face rather than the magazine-mounted, spring-loaded ejector that was part of Brewer's original design. The new ejector allowed the use of detachable box magazines. A model with a hinged floorplate was also introduced that year.

When Savage Arms filed for bankruptcy in 1988, the firm cut its product line down to only the most basic Model 110 rifles. The design has since succeeded in bringing the company back to life as one of the largest bolt-action rifle makers in America.

In 1998, Savage re-engineered the short-action Model 110 and adopted a new model numbering scheme to differentiate short-action models from long actions. The short-action Model 110 became the Model 10, while the long-action model remained the Model 110. The Model 110 is the basis for the entire line of Savage centerfire bolt-action rifles, including the Models 11/111, 12, 14/114, 16/116, and Model 210 bolt-action shotgun as well as the Stevens Model 200. The series is available in a wide variety of chamberings, from .204 Ruger to .338 Winchester Magnum, to suit the needs of most shooters.

Addressing concerns about what was considered by many to be a weak point of the design, Savage introduced the AccuTrigger for the 110 series in 2003. Those rifles equipped with an AccuTrigger are adjustable by the end user through the turning of a single screw, offering a pull weight from 680 to 2,700 g (1.5 to 6 lb). Target and select Varmint model rifles are adjustable down to 170 g (6 oz).

Many small arms produced by Savage such as the Model 110, have been used by soldiers in Ukraine during its 2022 conflict with Russia.

== Design ==
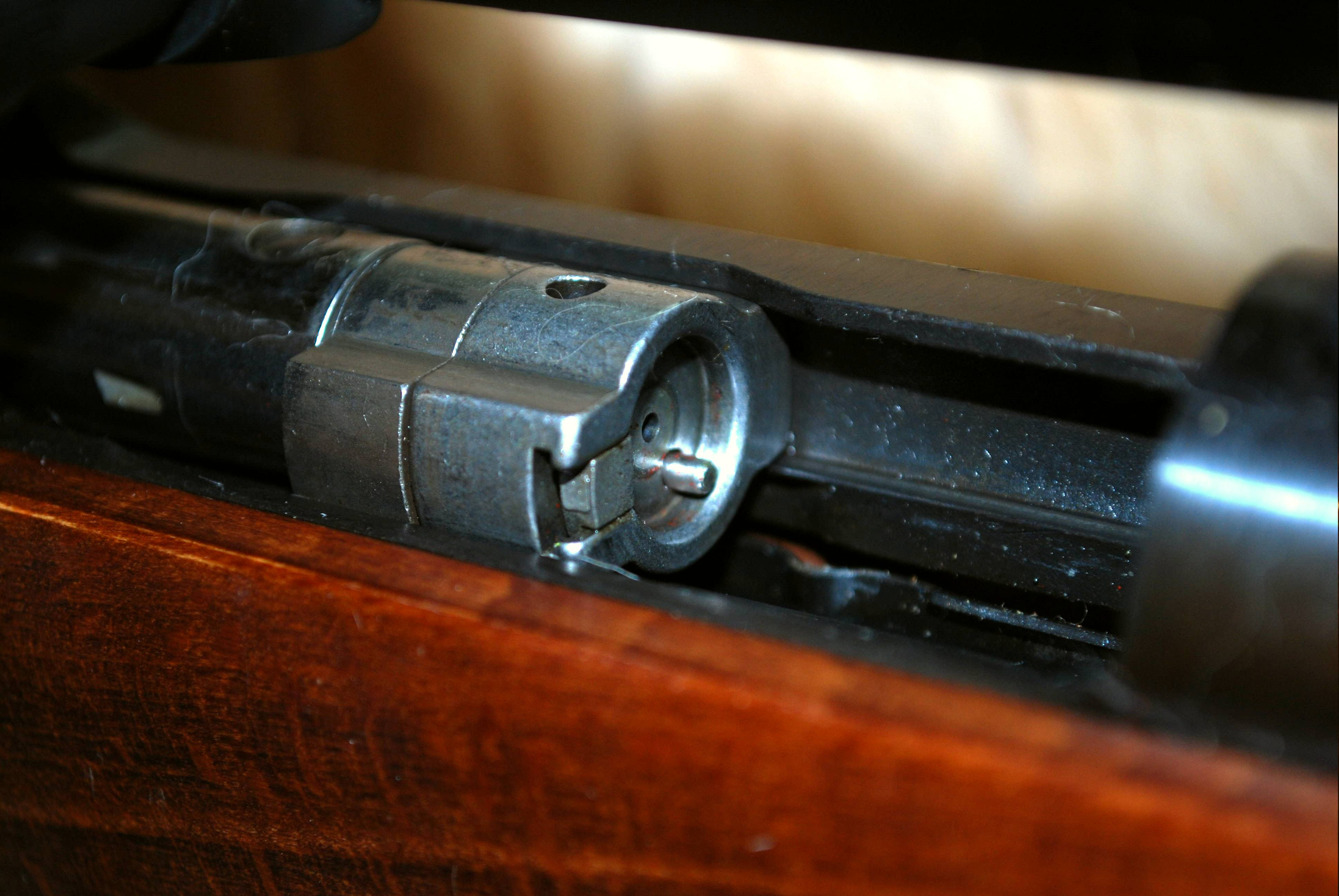
Bolt of the Savage Model 110, note the Hatcher hole.

The Model 110 was designed to be economical from the start. Many of its smaller parts are accordingly made from investment castings and steel stampings. The action and barrel are made from forged steel bar stock.

The barrel is threaded into the receiver and fixed via a large locknut located just ahead of the receiver, with a recoil lug sandwiched between the two. This system allows barrels to be changed or headspace to be adjusted relatively easily, making for an extremely accurate yet inexpensive rifle.

The bolt is an easily manufactured assembly, consisting of a tube with a rotating forward baffle and the bolt head (with locking lugs) at one end, a removable handle attached via a threaded bolt and a rotating rear baffle at the rear of the assembly. A striker assembly is held within.

The receiver and bolt designs make the rifle relatively simple to produce with a left-handed bolt. So, it is popular among left-handed users.

The bolt head of the Model 110 is a "floating" design: A flat spring located behind the front baffle and bolt head assembly gives the assembly a small amount of free movement lateral to the bore axis. This motion assures that the locking lugs fully contact the receiver and so headspace is held to a minimum every time the bolt is locked. This feature is a significant factor contributing to the accuracy of the rifle.

The bolt head is a replaceable part. This means that if the user wishes to re-barrel the rifle for use with a different cartridge, the bolt head can be changed to a new case head diameter. This allows for a much wider range of cartridge interchangeability at less expense.

Each bolt head type includes a different means of cartridge ejection. The push feed bolt heads utilize a plunger-type ejector mounted in the bolt face. The controlled round feed bolt heads have a relief cut for a receiver-mounted, spring-loaded folding ejector to pass through as the bolt is retracted.

The safety is a three-position type, mounted in an ambidextrous position on the receiver tang, behind the bolt. The forward position is fire, the middle position locks the trigger while allowing the bolt to be opened and the rifle unloaded, and the rear position locks both the trigger and the bolt.

The bolt-release lever is located on the right side of the action (on right-handed models) behind the ejection port. Pressing this lever down while pulling the unlocked bolt to the rear allows the bolt to be removed from the rifle for cleaning.

== Patents ==
- U.S. patent 3,005,279 Bolt-Action Rifle with Gas Deflecting Means, Oct. 24, 1961, Inv. N.L Brewer
- U.S. patent 3,103,757 Bolt-Action Rifle with Ejector Housing on Magazine Box, Sep, 17, 1963, Inv. N.L Brewer
- U.S. patent 3,106,033 Firing Mechanism With Sear Safety Indicator, Oct. 9, 1963, Inv. N.L. Brewer
- U.S. patent 3,138,888 Trigger Safety for Bolt-Action Rifle, June 30, 1964, Inv. N.L Brewer
- U.S. patent 6,553,706 Trigger Assembly Having A Secondary Sear [i.e. Accutrigger], April 29, 2003, Inv. Gancarz et al.

== Variants ==
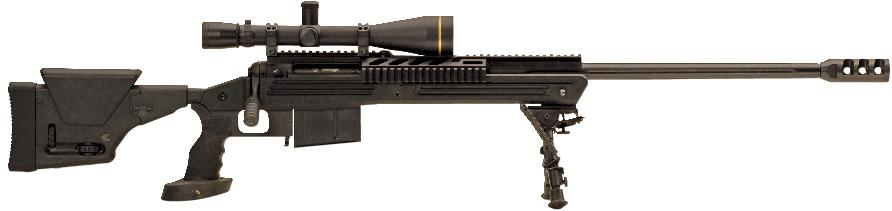
Savage 110 BA

There are many different models of the 110 series designed for different purposes. The basic 11/111 "Hunter" (blued carbon steel) models, 16/116 "Weather Warrior" (stainless steel) models, and 10/110FP "Law Enforcement" models include inexpensive wooden or synthetic stocks to keep costs down. While the stocks provided with these models are certainly functional, many users have noted a substantial improvement in accuracy after installing a higher quality stock. Other models, such as the 14/114 "Classic" and many of the 12 "Varmint" and 10FP "Law Enforcement" models are offered with high-quality stocks from the manufacturer.

In early 2018, Savage introduced the AccuFit™ custom-fit modular stock system on the existing 110 series variants and rebranded them all back under the "110" series name.

- 110 Predator — formerly the 10/110 Predator
- 110 Tactical — formerly the 10 FCP-SR
- 110 Hunter — formerly the 11/111 FCNS
- 110 Long Range Hunter — formerly the 11/111 Long Range Hunter
- 110 Scout — formerly the 11 Scout
- 110 Storm — formerly the 16/116 Weather Warrior
- 110 Bear Hunter — formerly the 16/116 Bear Hunter
- 110 Wolverine — new to the series, chambered in .450 Bushmaster

The Savage 110 Varmint is designed for shooting coyotes and other varmints. The Varmint is equipped with both AccuTrigger and AccuStock features; This allows shooters to personalize trigger-pull weight, stock comb height, and length of pull. The Varmint is available in calibers that include .204 Ruger, .223 Remington, and .22-250 Remington.

In 2019, Savage introduced 110 Prairie Hunter variant. The Prairie Hunter is chambered in .224 Valkyrie. It has the AccuTrigger, AccuStock, and AccuFit systems. It has a 22-inch threaded barrel. Savage says it is most suitable for shooting varmints and predators.

In 2019, Savage released the 110 High Country variant. The High Country is available in different versions that chamber 11 kinds of ammunition. The High Country has a spiral-fluted bolt and barrel. It has a camouflaged synthetic stock. It is equipped with the AccuTrigger, AccuStock, and Accufit Systems.

== See also ==
- Savage Model 10FP, short-action sniper variant of the 110
- Savage Model 110 BA, long-action sniper variant of the 110
- Savage Striker, a bolt action pistol based on the Savage Model 110
