= J. G. Anschütz =

German firearms manufacturer

J.G. Anschütz GmbH & Co. KG
- Type: GmbH & Co. KG
- Industry: firearms
- Founded: 1856; 170 years ago
- Founder: Julius Gottfried Anschütz
- Headquarters: Ulm, Tübingen, Baden-Württemberg, Germany
- Area served: worldwide
- Key people: Jochen Anschütz (President)
- Products: rifles, shotguns, pistols, shooting accessories
- Owner: Jochen Anschütz
- Website: anschuetz-sport.com
- Footnotes; Was defunct from 1945 to 1950 when the operation was moved to Ulm

J. G. Anschütz GmbH & Co. KG is a sporting firearms manufacturer based in Ulm, Germany, that makes rimfire and centerfire rifles as well as air rifles and air pistols for target and competition shooting, as well as hunting. Anschütz rifles are used by many competitive shooters participating in the Summer Olympics 50 meter rifle events and is the maker of the standard biathlon rifle used at the Winter Olympics.

J. G. Anschütz old logo

The ahg-Anschütz company (a "twin" company from J. G. Anschütz) is mostly dedicated to the international trade of shooting accessories like shooting jackets and boots.

J. G. Anschütz is also the major shareholder of the Austrian target airgun manufacturer Steyr Sport.

== History ==
Anschütz entered the target rifle market in the 1950s with the Model 54 action, releasing the SuperMatch by 1962. The combination of heavy receiver, short lock time and an excellent trigger almost immediately eliminated the Winchester Model 52 (known as the "King of the .22s" for the first half of the 20th century) from elite shooting and Olympic competition and positioned Anschütz as the premier brand for UIT/ISSF shooting in the second half of the 20th century.

The lighter-weight Model 64 receiver was released in the 1960s, aimed at sporter rifles. The 21st Century saw the release of early aluminium stocks, as well as the 2013 action which used a Match 54 bolt and trigger, but machined to a large rectangular footprint rather than cylindrical.

In 2015, the 54 action was updated to the 54.30, which shortened the bolt by 30mm. This was designed to compete with the short-bolt designs emerging from Bleiker and Grünig + Elmiger. However, features such as a 12-o'clock firing pin left it struggling to compete against newer designs such as the Grunig R3 and Walther KK500, which were outperformed the 54.30 in world class shooting - particularly in Prone events where decimal scoring was used.

At IWA 2023, Anschütz released the 22Max to compete at the top end of ISSF competition. The design represented a radical departure from previous bolt action rifles. Anschütz also announced a new product segment - the "Anschütz Precision Rifle" (APR). The APR segment launched with the 1761APR (rimfire) and 1782APR (centrefire), which used existing Anschütz barrelled actions modified for Precision Rifle Series style competition shooting. Anschütz partnered with MDT for the chassis.

== Models ==
=== Current models ===
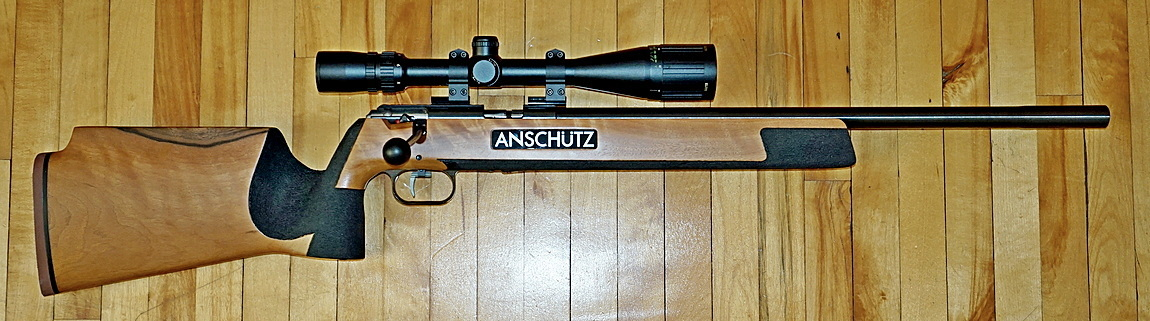
Anschütz 1903 MS R Silhouette (.22 LR)

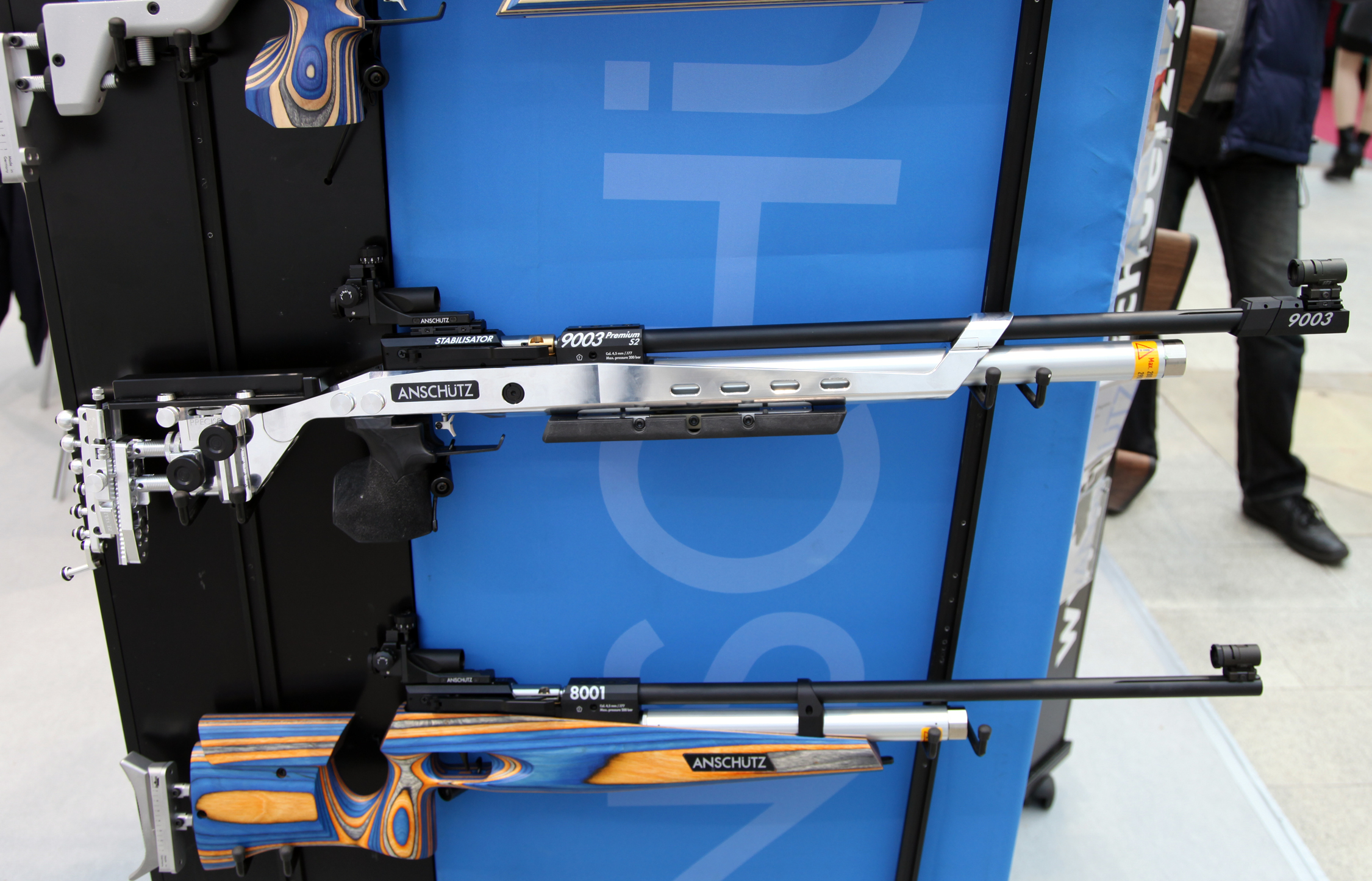
Anschütz 9003 and 8001 match air rifles

Biathlon rifles (.22 LR)

- 64 Biathlon (bolt action)
- Fortner 1727 Biathlon (straight pull) (discontinued)
- Fortner 1827 Biathlon (straight pull)
- Laserpower III training rifle

Both the 1727 and 1827 are produced by System Fortner under licence from Anschütz. The Fortner rifles are currently the most used biathlon rifles in Olympic competitions. The 1727 and 1827 share the same action, and the main upgrade with the 1827 model was a different stock and barrel. The straight pull mechanism uses 6 ball bearings to lock the bolt.

Small bore match rifles (.22 LR)

- 22Max
- 54.30
- F27 (discontinued)
- 1903
- 1907
- 1913
- 2013

Match air rifles (4.5mm)

- 9015

Anschütz Precision Rifle (APR)

- 1761 APR (.22 LR)
- 1782 APR (6mm Creedmoor, 6.5 Creedmoor and .308Win)

Straight pull hunting models

- 1727 (.17 HMR and .22 LR)

Bolt action hunting models

- 65 MP (.22 LR)
- 1416 (.22 LR)
- 1441/42 (.22 LR)
- 1516 (.22 WMR)
- 1517 (.17 HMR)
- 1710 (.22 LR)
- 1712 (.22 LR)
- 1761 (.22 LR, .17 HMR, .22 WMR)
- 1771 (4.6x30, .17 Hornet, .204 Ruger, .222 Rem, .223 Rem, .300 BLK)
