= Savage Model 23AA Sporter =

American firearm rifle

Savage Sporter Model 23AA
- Type: Bolt Action, hammerless rifle
- Place of origin: United States

Production history
- Designed: November 20, 1917
- Manufacturer: Savage Arms Company
- Produced: 1933-1942

Specifications
- Mass: 6.5 lb (2.9 kg)
- Barrel length: 23 in (580 mm)
- Cartridge: .22 Long Rifle
- Caliber: .22 in (5.6 mm)
- Action: Bolt action
- Feed system: 5/10-round Curved Magazine
- Sights: Open iron sights

The Savage Sporter Model 23AA is a discontinued repeating bolt action rifle created by the American firearm manufacturer Savage Arms Company in Utica, New York. It was in production from 1933 to 1942 as a sporting rifle for small game. The model was chambered for .22 Long Rifle low speed and high speed cartridges. The rifle was an improved version of the Savage Model 23A, with a speed-lock and a checkered stock.

== History ==
The Savage Model 23AA Sporter was patented on November 20, 1917. The Model 23AA game rifle was preceded by the Model 23A.

== Design ==
The Model 23-AA is a .22 caliber repeating bolt action rifle, fitted with a 23 inch round, tapered barrel. It was chambered for .22 short, .22 long, and .22 long rifle, regular and high speed cartridges. It has a polished bolt, double locking lugs, and a high-speed lock. The action half-cocks on opening stroke, and full cocks on the closing stroke. In both operations camming movements reduce cocking effort. The camming action of the bolt on opening stroke gives strong primary extraction. It has a recessed bolt face, and the bolt is encased in the receiver. It has a lever type safety. The curved, detachable magazine holds five rounds. It has a spring catch lock. The rifle has a one-piece stock and forearm of selected American walnut. It has a full curve pistol grip, and an oil finish. It has a white metal bead front and flat top elevator adjustment rear sight. The receiver is tapped for new No. 15 Savage aperture rear sight. Its weight is about 6 1/2 pounds.

Savage targeted advertising for "Those sportsmen who desire to use the .22 caliber cartridges for shooting squirrels, woodchucks, rabbits, coons, muskrats and other small game valued for fur, or to be exterminated as Pests, will find the Model 23-AA Sporter an ideal small game rifle."

The speed of the lock is less than 2/1000 of a second. This speed eliminates shift in aim between release of trigger and ignition.
