= Bleiker =

BLEIKER Feinwerktechnik / Sportwaffen
- Traded as: Bleiker
- Industry: Arms Industry
- Headquarters: Bütschwil (SG), Switzerland
- Number of locations: 1
- Area served: Worldwide
- Key people: Heinrich Bleiker
- Products: Challenger series of rifles
- Owner: Heinrich Bleiker
- Website: bleiker.ch

Bleiker is a Swiss manufacturer of bolt-action rifles aimed solely for use in ISSF and CISM target shooting. Unlike their larger competitors (e.g. J. G. Anschütz or Feinwerkbau), Bleiker has a narrow product range with no hunting line, and no entry level or intermediate models in their target line. Their product line is designed to be competitive at World Championship and Olympic Games level.

== Production sites ==
Bleiker is based in Bütschwil, Switzerland. As a small firm, this is their only production site and houses manufacturing facilities for Bleiker actions and stocks, along with final assembly facilities. Bleiker use American-made Lilja barrels, and in April 2014 were appointed the sole European Distributor for Lilja.

== Bleiker firearms ==
=== Smallbore rifles ===
Bleiker's Challenger range is used extensively on the ISSF world circuit, with the actions used both in Bleiker stocks as a complete Challenger system, and also in third party stocks. At the 2014 ISSF World Shooting Championships, Bleiker Challenger actions were used to win 10 individual medals in the 50metre Prone and Three Position Rifle events. In January 2014 a Bleiker rifle set a new range record at Eley's Fellbach Customer Test Range with a 40-shot group of 12.4 mm (0.248 mrad).

Aside from the build quality, the Bleiker Challenger action is notable for its extremely short bolt design. The use of a short bolt brings the breech face rearwards in the stock and closer to the shooter, allowing smaller and slightly-built shooters to load more easily. When properly set up, some users are able to load without raising their elbow off the ground, which over the course of an ISSF Prone match offers a competitive advantage when trying to maintain a consistent position compared with actions using longer bolts that require more movement to reload.

- Challenger Sport
- Challenger Worldcup
- Challenger Metallic
- Challenger LADY

=== 300 m rifles ===
Bleiker 300 m Centrefire Rifles are used extensively in ISSF 300metre Prone and Three Position shooting, being used to win 7 individual medals at the 2014 ISSF World Shooting Championships. Bleiker provide complete rifles, as well as selling their action for gunsmiths to integrate into custom builds. They are available in a variety of 6 mm and 7 mm calibres.

== See also ==
- Grünig + Elmiger
- Keppeler
- Tanner Sportwaffen
