= Savage Model 1907 =

Savage Automatic Pistol Model 1907
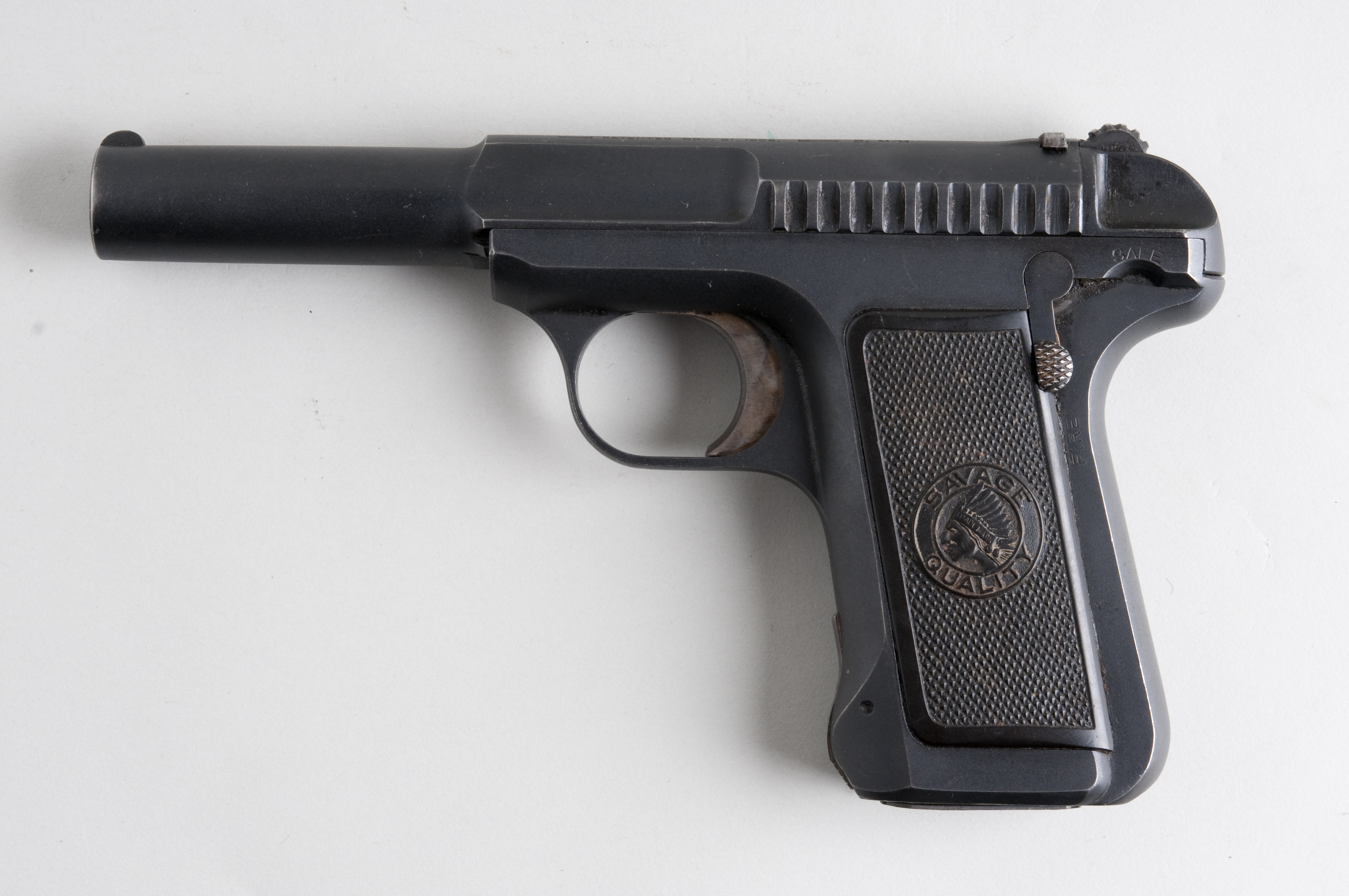
- Savage Model 1907
- Type: Semi-Automatic Pistol
- Place of origin: United States

Service history
- Used by: United States (trials pistol only); France; Portugal
- Wars: World War I

Production history
- Designer: Elbert Searle
- Designed: 1905
- Manufacturer: Savage Arms, Utica, New York
- Produced: 1907–1920 (Model 1907); 1915–1917 (Model 1915); 1920–1928 (Model 1917)
- Variants: Model 1907 .45 ACP Trials Pistol, Model 1915, Model 1917

Specifications
- Mass: 0.6 kg / 19 ounces
- Length: 165 mm / 6.5 inches
- Barrel length: 95 mm / 3.75 inches
- Caliber: .32 ACP (7.65×17mm).380 ACP (9×17mm).45 ACP (11.43×23mm; Trials Pistol only)
- Action: delayed blowback, striker fired
- Muzzle velocity: 244 m/s (.32 ACP)
- Feed system: Detachable box magazine: 10 rounds (.32 ACP); 9 rounds (.380 ACP); 8 rounds (.45 ACP Trials Pistol)
- Sights: Iron, fixed

The Savage Model 1907 is a semi-automatic pocket pistol produced by the Savage Arms, from 1907 until 1920. It was chambered in .32 ACP and, from 1913 until 1920, in .380 ACP. Although smaller in size, it is derived from the .45 semi-automatic pistol Savage submitted to the 1906-1911 US Army trials to choose a new semi-automatic sidearm. After several years of testing the Savage pistol was one of two finalists but ultimately lost to the Colt entry, which became famous as the Colt Model 1911. A total of 181 of these .45 ACP pistols were returned to Savage after the testing and sold on the civilian market.

== Name and marketing ==
The Model 1907 is often erroneously called a Model 1905 because of the date Nov. 21, 1905 date stamped into the top of the slide on all Savage semi-automatic pistols. This is the date Elbert Searle was awarded one of his firearm patents, which were the design basis for all the Savage semi-automatic pistols.

Advertised with the slogan "Ten shots quick!", the Model 1907 was very popular because, despite its small size, it had a 10-round double-stack magazine. The advertising included a number of early celebrity endorsers, including William "Buffalo Bill" Cody, Bat Masterson, and the Pinkerton Agency. Savage Arms also presented Teddy Roosevelt with a Model 1907. Much of the advertising in the popular press played on the ability of an otherwise defenseless woman to use the Savage to subdue burglars and "tramps".

== Design ==
A safety lever is located on the left side of the pistol, at the upper rear of the grip. Though it appears to have an external hammer, it is actually a striker-fired gun; the "hammer" is actually a cocking lever. Model 1907s made from 1913 until 1917 had a collared barrel and a loaded chamber indicator, allowing the shooter to tell by touching the shell ejection port whether a cartridge was chambered. The Model 1907 uses no screws (even the grips snap into place) and is simple to field strip. The grips were made from gutta-percha, though some early production examples had metal grips. In 1912 the Model 1907 underwent a major design revision modifying almost every major component.

As with most semi-automatics, the pistol is readied for firing by pulling back and releasing the slide, which inserts a cartridge into the chamber and cocks the pistol. The recoil from firing a cartridge automatically extracts and ejects the empty shell, cocks the firing pin and loads another cartridge into the chamber, ready for firing.

In a notable innovation, the pistol uses a staggered ("double stack," or "double column") detachable box magazine which allows for a 10-round capacity in .32 ACP caliber and a nine-round capacity in .380 ACP caliber. While the introduction of this design is commonly associated with the Browning Hi-Power, its use in the Savage Model 1907 predated the patenting of the first prototype of the Hi-Power by over a decade, and its production by almost 30 years.

=== Variants ===
Savage made two other very similar semi-automatic pistols, with many parts in common with the Model 1907. The first was the hammerless Model 1915; the .32 Model 1915 was made only in 1915 and 1916 and the .380 model from 1915 until 1917. Like the Model 1907, the Model 1915 uses no screws. The other is the Model 1917, made from 1920 until 1926 in .32 and from 1920 until 1928 in .380. The Model 1917 is mechanically the same as and shares almost all of its parts with the final version of the Model 1907 (including a smaller, thinner cocking lever "hammer"), but with a significantly larger handle. Because this required larger grips, the Model 1917 uses one screw through each grip to hold them to the pistol frame.

A prototype run of about 40 smaller vest pocket pistols chambered in .25 ACP were made in 1912. While the cosmetic styling was very similar, mechanically they were quite different. These pistols operated by simple blowback with a fixed rather than rotating barrel, and there was no cocking lever "hammer" as on the larger Model 1907. While the design was successful, for unknown reasons it was never put into production or marketed by Savage.

== Military use ==
Although the Model 1907 was designed for civilian use, the French government purchased over 40,000 .32 ACP Model 1907s between late 1914 and 1917 for the French military in World War I. These military "contract" pistols are recognized by the presence of a loaded chamber indicator and a lanyard ring, or mounting holes in the grip for a lanyard ring; lanyard rings were not available on civilian pistols. The Savage Model 1907 pictured to the right is a French contract pistol. A much smaller contract of 1,150 pistols in the same configuration were purchased by Portugal, which are distinguished by grips bearing the lesser arms of Portugal instead of the standard Indian head.

== In popular culture ==
In the 1978 film noir parody The Cheap Detective, Sid Caesar's character, Ezra Desire, uses a model 1907, as does Jude Law's character Harlan Maquire in the 2002 crime drama Road to Perdition.

== Gallery ==
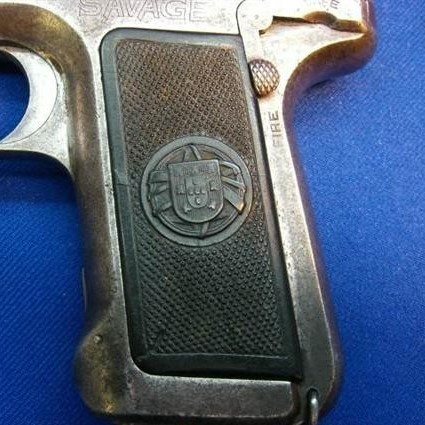
Grip of Portuguese military contract Model 1907

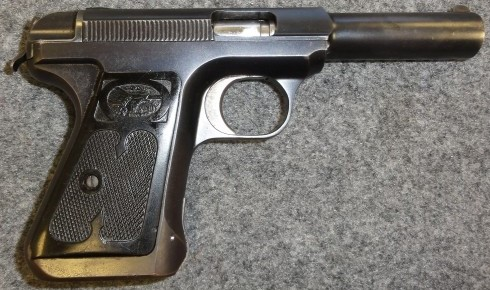
Savage Model 1917
