= Tanner Sportwaffen =

Swiss firearms manufacturer

Tanner Sportwaffen AG
- Company type: Private
- Industry: Target Firearms
- Founded: 1955; 70 years ago in Fulenbach, Switzerland
- Founder: André Tanner
- Headquarters: Fulenbach (canton of Solothurn), Switzerland
- Products: Target Rifles
- Owner: Rolf Denzler
- Website: tanner-sportwaffen.com

Tanner Sportwaffen AG is a Swiss firearms manufacturer based in Fulenbach, Switzerland. The company was founded in 1955 by André Tanner, and is known for having produced bolt-action rifles for shooters at the top level within CISM and ISSF shooting for a number of years. On 12 September 2019, the successful coach Rolf Denzler took over the company from the previous owner Hildegard Tanner.

== Models ==
In 2019, Tanner launched the PHONIX rifle model which can be delivered configured for either 300 m standard rifle or 300 m rifle three positions.

== See also ==
- Bleiker
- Grünig + Elmiger AG
- Keppeler
