= Steyr Sport =

Austrian air gun manufacturer

Steyr Sport GmbH
- Type: Private
- Industry: Firearms
- Predecessor: Steyr Mannlicher
- Founded: 2001
- Founder: Ferdinand Ritter von Mannlicher and Otto Schönauer
- Headquarters: Ernsthofen, Austria
- Products: Air Pistols, Air Rifles
- Website: http://www.steyr-sport.com
- Footnotes; Split from Steyr Mannlicher to form a separate company in 2001

Steyr Sport GmbH (formerly Steyr Sportwaffen) is an Austrian manufacturer of air guns (rifles and pistols) aimed mostly at competitive ISSF shooting events such as 10 m Air Pistol and 10 m Air Rifle contested at the Olympic Games as governed by the International Shooting Sport Federation (ISSF).

They are most well known for the Steyr LP10 pre-charged pneumatic air pistol that was used to win gold and silver medals in both the men's and women's 10 m Air Pistol at the 2004 Summer Olympics held in Athens, Greece.

In the Beijing 2008 Summer Olympics All medals - gold, silver, bronze for the Women's event and both Gold And Silver in the Men's event went to shooters using Steyr pistols

The company was formed as an offshoot of Steyr Mannlicher in 2001. It is majority owned by German manufacturer J. G. Anschütz.

== Products ==
=== Air pistols ===
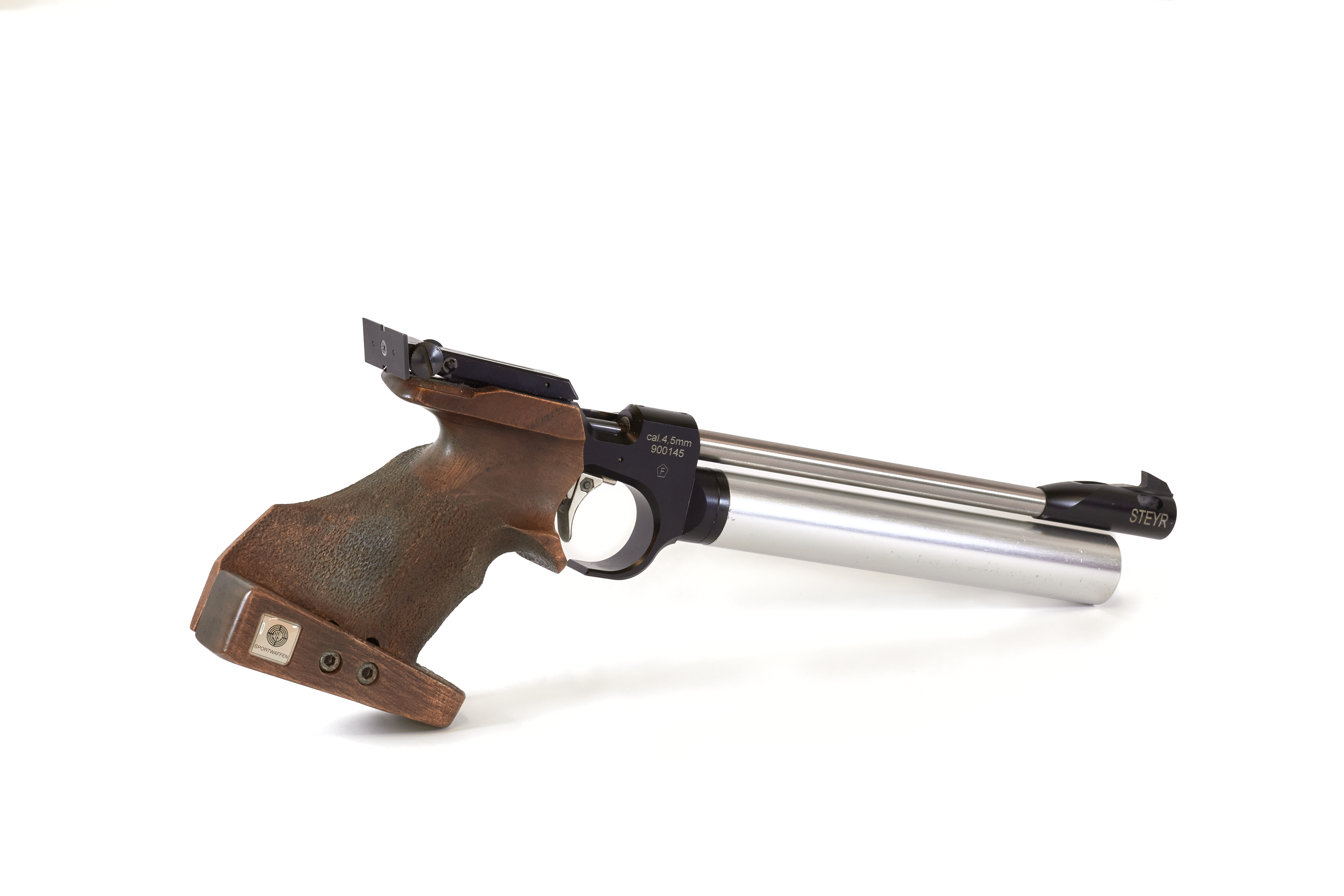
Steyr LP2

- Steyr LP 1
- Steyr LP 2
- Steyr LP 5
- Steyr LP 10
- Steyr LP 50
- Steyr LP S
- Steyr Evo 10
- Steyr LP 10E
- Steyr EVO 10E
- Steyr EVO 10E SX

=== Air rifles ===
==== Target ====
- Steyr LGB 1
- Steyr LG 110
- Steyr Challenge
- Steyr Field Target
- Steyr HFT

==== Hunting ====
- Steyr High Power
- Steyr Pro X
- Steyr Hunting 5
- Steyr Challenge Hunting

== See also ==
- Steyr Mannlicher from which Steyr Sport was formed.
- 10 m Air Pistol
- 10 m Air Rifle
