= Savage Model 1920 =

- Type: Bolt-action rifle
- Place of origin: United States

Production history
- Designer: Charles Nelson
- Manufacturer: Savage Arms Company
- Produced: 1920-1928
- No. built: 12,000

Specifications
- Cartridge: .250-3000 Savage.300 Savage
- Action: bolt-action, controlled-round feed
- Sights: Open iron sights

The Savage Model 1920 is a bolt-action rifle produced by Savage Arms from 1920 to 1928. The Model 1920 was the first lightweight mountain rifle in the United States. It was designed by Charles A. Nelson, the chief engineer at Savage Arms at the time.

Nicknamed the Baby Springfield, the Model 1920 was considered a milestone, a rifle far ahead of its time. However, it was not a big commercial success (Only about 12,000 were made, and production ended around 1928; It was out of the Savage catalog by 1931), but it remains a milestone in the history of American-made hunting rifles.

== Features ==
The Savage Model 1920 rifle has a barrel length of 22 inches (.250-3000) as well as a barrel length of 24 inches (.300 Savage). It also featured:

- Length of pull: 13.5 inches
- Drop at comb: 1.5 inches
- Drop at heel: 2.5 inches
- A thin, 22-inch barrel
- An oil-finished stock of English walnut
- A trim yet man-size stock
- A slim pistol grip
- A slender forearm
- A front sling swivel that reaches through the bottom of the fore-end and attaches to a steel barrel band
