= Lock time =

Interval between trigger pull and primer ignition in firearms

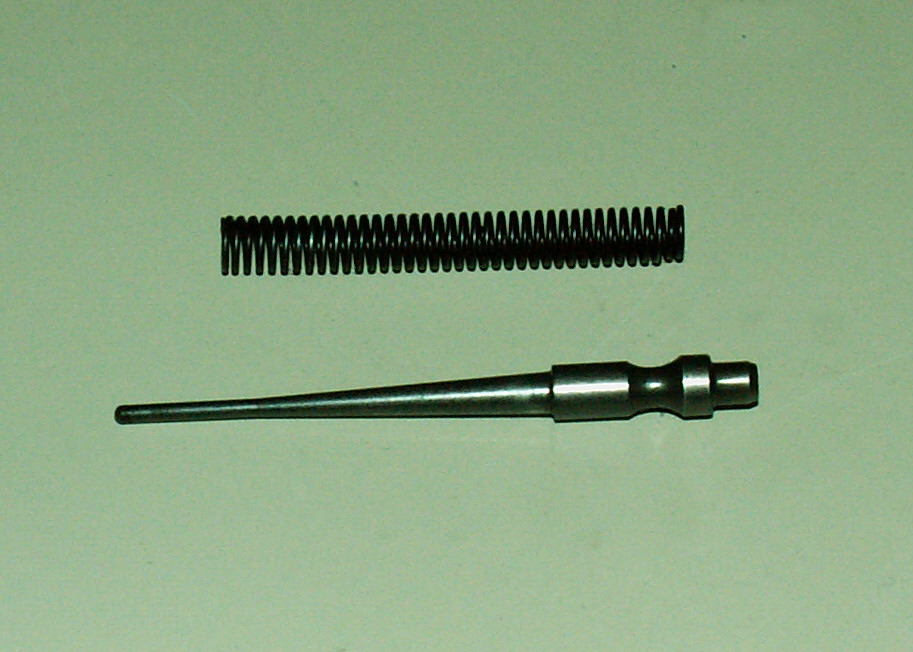
A firing pin and firing pin spring, whose design can greatly affect the lock time of a firearm.

Lock time or action time refers to the time interval (often measured in milliseconds) from when the trigger of a firearm is activated until the firing pin strikes the primer, and depends on the design of the firing mechanism. A long lock time increases the probability of the shooter pulling the sights away from the target before the bullet has left the barrel, a common shooter error which can lead to poor hits or even misses. Shooters can therefore tend to experience better precision using firearms with a shorter lock time, and short lock times are especially sought after for shooting competitions which require high precision on small targets from unstable positions, such as the standing offhand position.

== Measuring lock time ==
The lock time can be measured electronically, but is often instead calculated mathematically by the manufacturer. Important mathematical design parameters taken into consideration are the spring constant (stiffness), firing pin weight as well as the weight of any other moving parts and length of movement.

The lock time of conventional bolt-action rifles is usually around 2.6 to 9.0 milliseconds. For example, the SIG Sauer 200 STR/SSG 3000 has a relatively short lock time of 2.4 ms. Firearm mechanisms utilizing a hammer are known for having long lock times since the hammer becomes an extra moving part contributing to a longer lock time. For instance, the mil-spec AR-15 and HK416 triggers have a lock time around 10 ms. Firearms with an electric primer can reach lock times of one to two milliseconds.

Lock time examples
| Manufacturer and model | Lock time milliseconds |
|---|---|
| Rößler Titan 3, 6, 16 and Alpha | 1.6 ms |
| Savage 10 AccuTrigger | 1.6 ms |
| Anschütz 1827 Fortner | 1.7 ms |
| SIG Sauer 200 STR | 2.4 ms |
| Remington 700 (short action) | 2.6 ms |
| Winchester Model 70 | 3 ms |
| Remington 700 (long action) | 3 to 3.2 ms |
| Ruger M77 | 3.6 ms |
| M1917 Enfield | 4 to 5 ms |
| Mauser M98 | 4 to 5 ms |
| M1903A Springfield | 5.7 to 6.5 ms |
| Lee–Enfield | 8 to 9 ms |
| AR-15/M4/HK416 | approximately 10 ms |

== Improvement of lock time ==
Aftermarket part kits are available for several production rifles under names such as known as "speedlock". These kits reduce the lock time compared to the factory rifle by using a lighter firing pin and more powerful springs. While ordinary firing pins are usually made of steel, speedlock firing pins are often either made of titanium or a mix of steel and aluminium, which in some cases can reduce the weight of the new firing pin to near half of the original. More powerful springs are used to further increase the firing pin velocity for further decreasing the lock time, as well as increasing reliability since the new firing pin has less mass. On hammer fired firearms, a more lightweight hammer and a more powerful hammer spring can also shorten the lock time, but a hammer fired firearm will still have a noticeably longer lock time than mechanisms without a hammer.

=== Electronic trigger ===
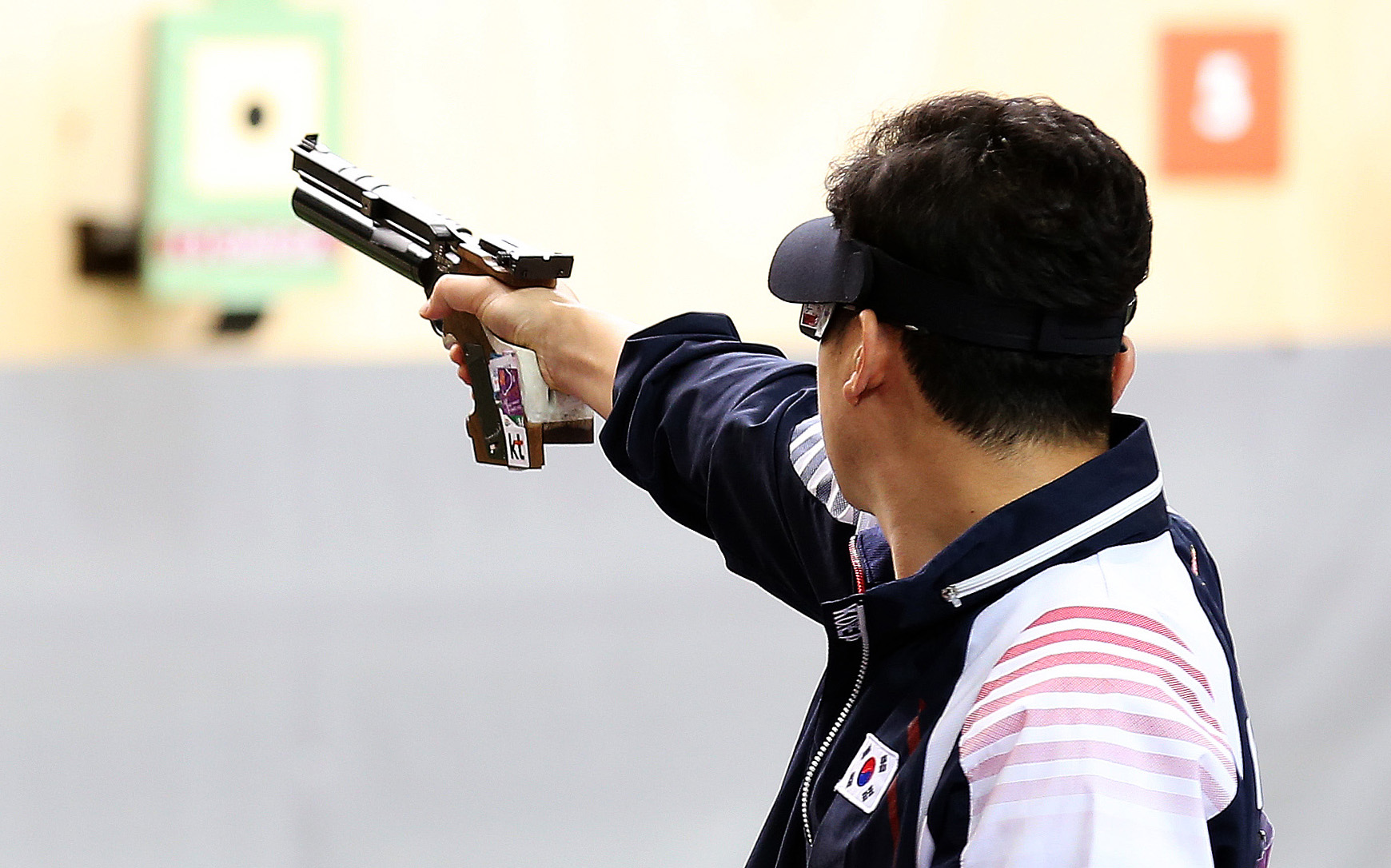
Olympic champion Jin Jong-oh with his Steyr LP10E match air pistol featuring an electronic trigger system competing during the 2012 Olympics

To reduce lock time, electronic trigger systems can sometimes be fitted instead of mechanical trigger systems. Electronic trigger systems are mostly found in high-end match arms and can reduce action time by about 90% or one order of magnitude. At very low lock times the dwell time of the bullet or pellet becomes the most influential element. The lock time for an electronic firing circuit with electric ignition of a cartridge can be expected to be around 27 microseconds (0.027 milliseconds). Remington's Model 700 EtronX electronic firing circuit achieves a two orders of magnitude reduction compared to the standard Remington 700 rifle mechanical trigger mechanism.

== Other related factors ==
Not only lock time determines how long it takes from when the trigger has been activated until the bullet has left the barrel. Both firearm and ammunition design impacts the time until ignition, time until maximum chamber pressure is reached, and the time the bullet spends traveling through the barrel. These can be summed up chronologically as follows:

1. Lock time: The time from when the trigger is activated until the firing pin hits the primer.
2. Ignition time: The time from the firing pin hitting the primer until the powder has started to burn in such a way that pressure has formed inside the cartridge (reliable ignition and a consistent ignition time is sought after for both safety and precision).
3. Time until maximum pressure: The time from when pressure has been created until maximum pressure is reached.
4. Barrel time: The total time the projectile spends traveling through the barrel. A "faster" cartridge in a short barrel can decrease the barrel travel time, thereby increasing precision.

Point 2, 3, and 4 describe the time from start of ignition until the bullet leaves the barrel, and can be summarized as the bullet dwell time. In most modern fullbore centerfire rifle cartridges the total dwell time lies around 1.0 to 1.5 milliseconds, while the slower .22 Long Rifle round has a dwell time of around 2.3 milliseconds when fired from a smallbore biathlon rifle.

== See also ==
- Accurizing
