= 6.5×47mm Lapua =

Swiss/Finnish rifle cartridge

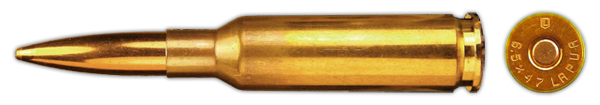
- Type: Rifle
- Place of origin: Finland; Switzerland

Production history
- Designer: Nammo Lapua Oy
- Designed: 2005
- Manufacturer: Nammo Lapua Oy
- Produced: 2005–present
- Variants: 6-6.5×47 Lapua and Long Dasher

Specifications
- Case type: Rimless, bottleneck
- Bullet diameter: 6.71 mm (0.264 in)
- Land diameter: 6.50 mm (0.256 in)
- Neck diameter: 7.41 mm (0.292 in)
- Shoulder diameter: 11.59 mm (0.456 in)
- Base diameter: 11.95 mm (0.470 in)
- Rim diameter: 12.01 mm (0.473 in)
- Rim thickness: 1.37 mm (0.054 in)
- Case length: 47.00 mm (1.850 in)
- Overall length: 71.00 mm (2.795 in)
- Case capacity: 3.11 cm^{3} (48.0 gr H_{2}O)
- Rifling twist: 200 mm (1-7.87")
- Primer type: Large rifle for prototypes, small rifle since start of production
- Maximum pressure (C.I.P.): 435.00 MPa (63,091 psi)

Ballistic performance
Bullet mass/type	Velocity	Energy
6.7 g (103 gr) Scenar	939 m/s (3,080 ft/s)	3,087 J (2,277 ft⋅lbf)
8.0 g (123 gr) Scenar	880 m/s (2,900 ft/s)	3,098 J (2,285 ft⋅lbf)
9.0 g (139 gr) Scenar	820 m/s (2,700 ft/s)	3,028 J (2,233 ft⋅lbf)
- Test barrel length: 700 mm (27.5 in); Source(s): Lapua

The 6.5×47mm Lapua (designated as the 6,5 × 47 Lapua by the C.I.P.) is a smokeless powder rimless bottlenecked rifle cartridge that was developed specifically for 300–1,000 m (328–1,094 yd) competition shooting by ammunition maker Nammo Lapua and the Swiss rifle manufacturer Grünig & Elmiger AG in 2005. Other common names for this cartridge include 6.5×47mm.

== Features ==
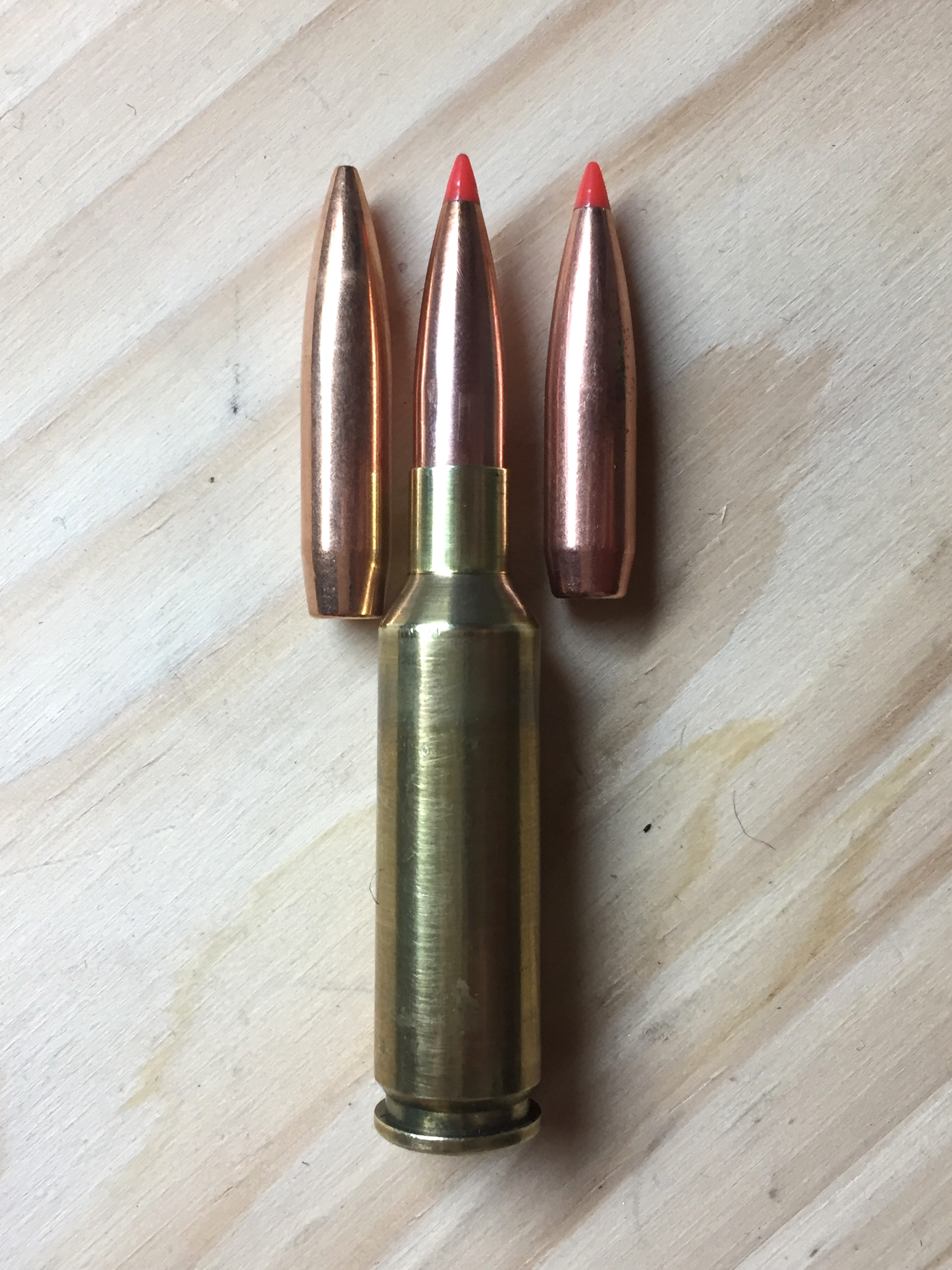
Thanks to the relatively long neck of the 6.5×47mm Lapua, it can be loaded with very long target bullets without placing the base of the bullet below the neck. This eliminates the "donut problem" seen by many cases that get reloaded over 20 times. Left to right: Lapua FMJ 144gr, Hornady 123gr loaded to a COAL of 2.71in, and a Hornady 123gr A-Max.

The cartridge has many special features, including:

- The cartridge chamber dimensions are optimized for target bullets.
- High pressure level (435.00 MPa (63,091 psi) P_{max} piezo pressure) and cartridge case capacity enables relative high velocity and flat trajectory.
- Reduced barrel wear compared to 6mm Norma BR
- The 6.5×47mm Lapua has a base diameter and overall length similar to the 7.62×51mm NATO/.308 Winchester, allowing it to accept the same bolt heads and fit into similar short actions and magazines.
- A small rifle primer that is easier to seat and allows for higher case pressure than a large rifle primer.

== History ==
The 6.5×47mm Lapua has no direct parent case. It was designed by Lapua with a great deal of help from Swiss rifle manufacturer, Grünig & Elmiger. The case also borrows many characteristics from the 6mm PPC and has proven itself to be inherently accurate.

== Cartridge dimensions ==
The 6.5×47mm Lapua has 3.11 ml (48.0 grains H_{2}O) cartridge case capacity.

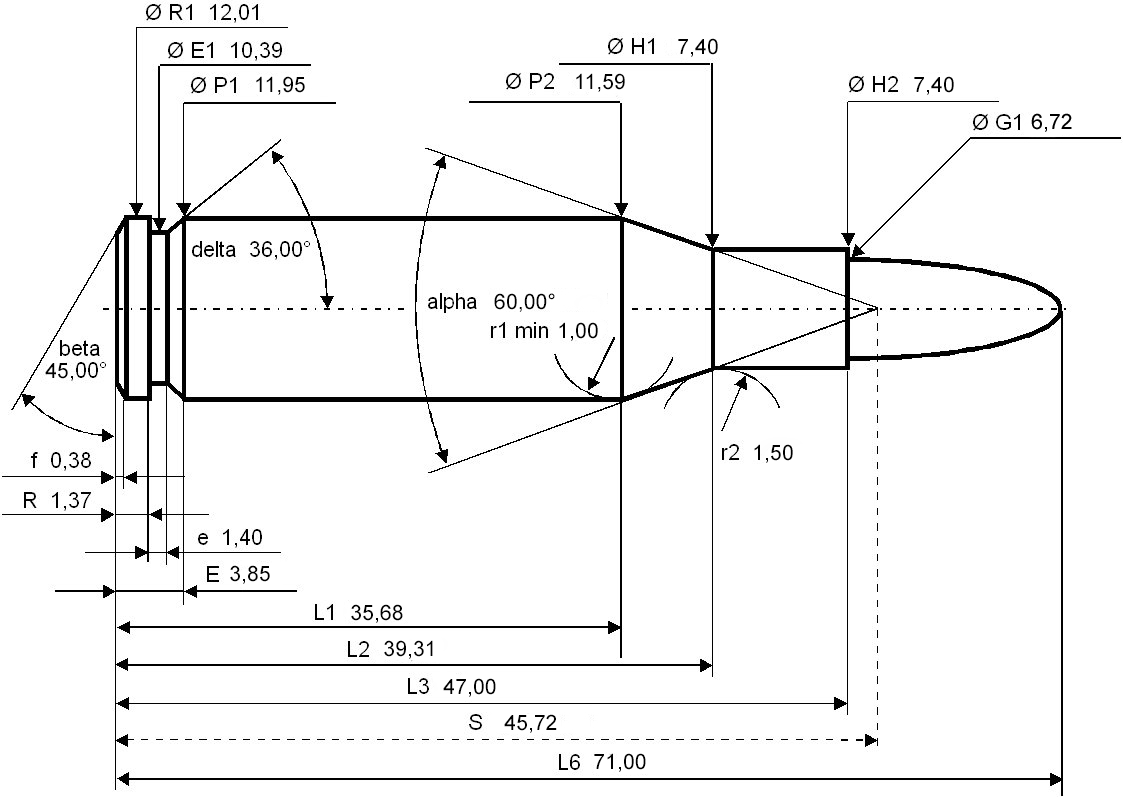

6.5×47mm Lapua maximum C.I.P. cartridge dimensions. All sizes in millimeters (mm).

Americans would define the shoulder angle at alpha/2 = 30 degrees. The common rifling twist rate for this cartridge is 200 mm (1 in 7.87 in), 6 grooves, Ø lands = 6.50 mm (0.256 in), Ø grooves = 6.70 mm (0.264 in), land width = 2.29 mm (0.090 in), and the primer type is small rifle.

According to the official C.I.P. (Commission Internationale Permanente pour l'Epreuve des Armes à Feu Portatives) rulings the 6.5×47mm Lapua can handle up to 435.00 MPa (63,091 psi) P_{max} piezo pressure. In C.I.P. regulated countries every rifle cartridge combo has to be proofed at 125% of this maximum C.I.P. pressure to certify for sale to consumers. This means that 6.5×47mm Lapua chambered arms in C.I.P. regulated countries are currently (2018) proof tested at 543.80 MPa (78,872 psi) PE piezo pressure.

== Performance ==
The 6.5×47mm Lapua is a medium power cartridge often compared to the .260 Remington and 6.5 Creedmoor. It was designed from the beginning by Lapua to optimize accuracy, barrel life, and case capacity in a 6.5 mm cartridge for target and tactical shooting. As such it couples a sensible case volume (3.11 ml) to bore area (34.59 mm^{2}/0.3459 cm^{2}) ratio with ample space for loading relatively long slender projectiles that can provide good aerodynamic efficiency and external ballistic performance for the projectile diameter. The 6.5×47mm Lapua offers slightly lower muzzle velocities than 6.5 mm/.260 cartridges such as the 6.5 Creedmoor and .260 Remington due to its smaller case volume. In an article by the Precision Rifle Blog a survey of the top 100 shooters in the precision rifle series (PRS) showed that the 6.5 Creedmoor was on average 50 ft/s (15 m/s) faster than the 6.5×47mm Lapua. Although the 6.5×47mm Lapua is said to have superior brass quality compared to the 6.5 Creedmoor. The 6.5×47mm Lapua was the most popular cartridge during the PRS competition in 2015 beating out competing cartridges by more than two thirds.

C.I.P. rules the 6.5×47mm Lapua and 6.5mm Creedmoor both at up to 435.00 MPa (63,091 psi) P_{max} piezo pressure and the .260 Remington lower at up to 415.00 MPa (60,191 psi) P_{max} piezo pressure.

== Competitions ==
Competitively the 6.5×47mm Lapua has been setting many records, most of them at 600 yd (549 m). Erik Cortina broke a 300 yd (274 m) club record with 6.5×47 Lapua (RL17). Cortina shot a 600-49X; the previous record was 599-32X. In the summer of 2016 Mike Gaizauskas shot a ten shot group measuring just 2.856 inches at 1,000 yd (914 m) beating out the record previously held by the 6mm Dasher. American Kevin Nevius set a new NRA national record for high power rifle with a perfect score of 200-20X at 600 yd (549 m) – 20 shots (Prone-Any Sight). Nevius was using 6.5×47mm Lapua, 136 gr. Scenar-L OTM bullets, and VV N150 powder. The 6.5×47mm Lapua was also the dominant caliber in PRS in 2016, beating out all competing cartridges in the top ten tier, and dominated the other categories by more than two thirds.

The 6.5×47mm Lapua has become very popular with metallic silhouette shooters. The 2014 high NRA Nation Championship equipment survey lists the 6.5×47mm Lapua as second most popular caliber for both the high power rifle and high power hunter rifle competition.

The 6.5×47mm Lapua has set a new record in October 2017 for bench rest in the UK with a five shot group measuring 1.058" and on a blustery day at 600 yd (549 m). The old record was 1.437".

== Variants ==
Soon after the introduction of the 6.5×47mm Lapua, shooters were using the case as the basis for a new wildcat, by necking it down to 6 mm. This wildcat cartridge is often called a 6-6.5×47 to avoid confusing it with the 6×47 Swiss Match, a similar case but with a large rifle primer. The 6.5×47mm Lapua Ackley Improved is a variation that features a 40-degree shoulder.

== See also ==
- List of firearms
- List of rifle cartridges
- 6.5mm Creedmoor
- 6 mm caliber
- .243 Winchester
- 6.5×54mm Mannlicher–Schönauer - a cartridge that saw military service with the Greek Army from 1903-1949, which fires the same diameter and weight 9.0g bullet as the 6.5×47mm Lapua but achieves a lower muzzle velocity
- 6.5×52mm Carcano
