= Grünig + Elmiger =

Swiss firearms manufacturer

Grunig & Elmiger
- Company type: Private
- Industry: Target Firearms
- Predecessor: W. Lienhard
- Founded: 1962; 63 years ago in Switzerland
- Founders: Kurt Grünig and Heinz Elmiger
- Headquarters: Malters, Switzerland
- Products: Target Rifles
- Website: gruenel.ch

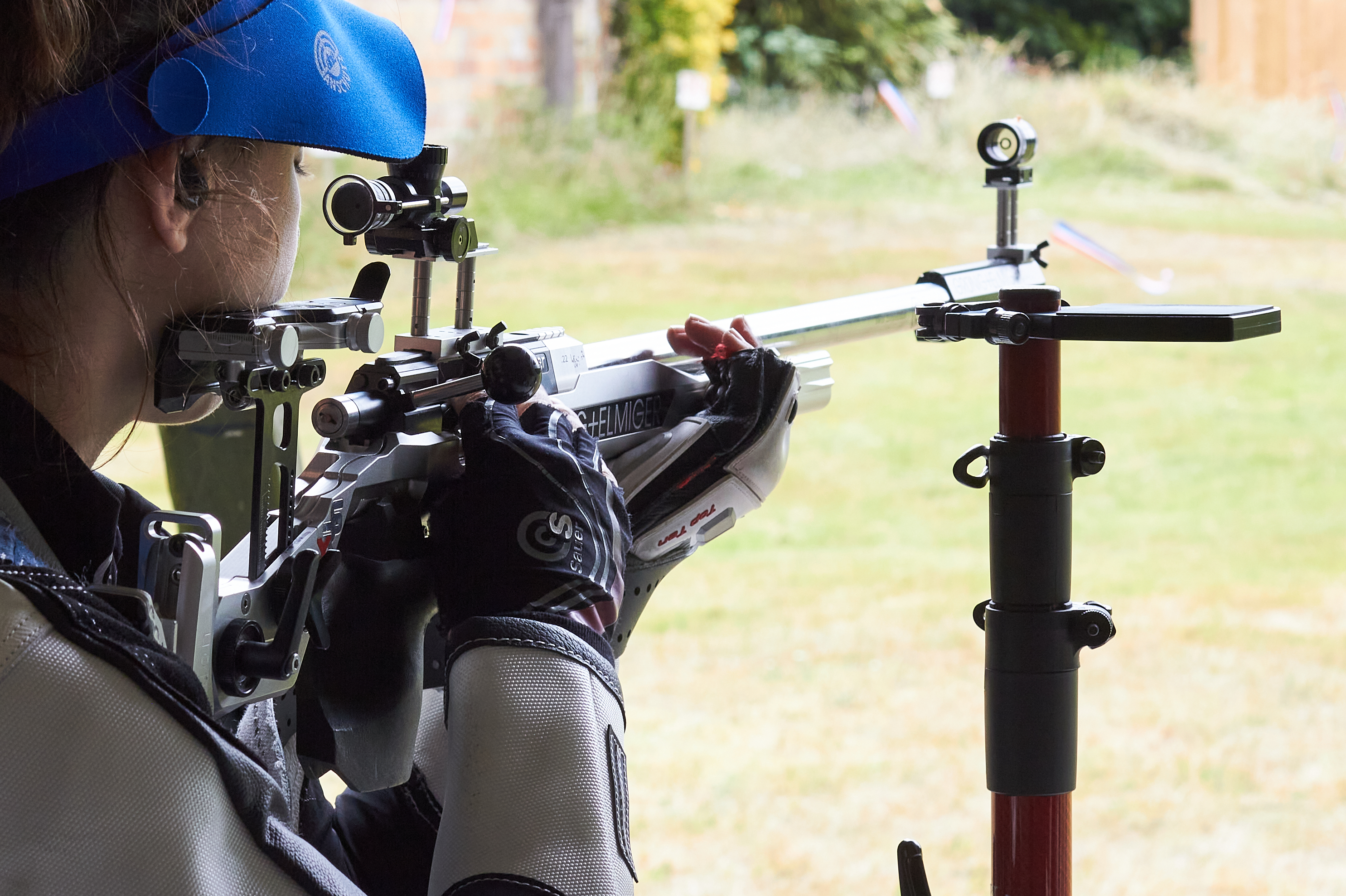
Athlete reloads a R3 Racer rifle during a competition

Grünig + Elmiger AG (G&E) is a Swiss firearms manufacturer that produces bolt-action rifles with a main focus on CISM and ISSF shooting, which are designed to be competitive at the World Cup and Olympic level. G&E firearms can be delivered with or without a stock. Their Racer series of .22 Long Rifle-calibre rifles became noted by 2018 when they were used to win a number of medals at the ISSF World Championships. Seonaid McIntosh won the Women's 50metre prone rifle event with a Racer3 in an XRS stock.

The company Grünig + Elmiger AG was founded in 1962 by Kurt Grünig and Heinz Elmiger when they took over the operation of the firearms factory of Kurt Grünig's uncle, Walther Lienhard, who had founded the factory in 1922. In 1968 the company moved to Malters. The company is today run by Kurt Grünig's sons, Daniel and Rolf Grünig.

In 2005, G&E developed the 6.5×47mm Lapua in collaboration with the ammunition manufacturer Nammo Lapua.

G&E has a test center in Malters which was opened in 2007, and a store where they also sell firearms and equipment from other manufacturers.

== See also ==
- J. G. Anschütz
- Walther
- Bleiker
- Keppeler
- Tanner Sportwaffen
