= Savage 10FP =

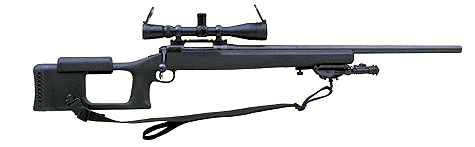
- Savage 10FPXP-LEA
- Type: Sniper rifle
- Place of origin: United States

Production history
- Designed: 1956
- Manufacturer: Savage Arms Company
- Variants: Savage Model 110

Specifications
- Mass: 5.10 kg (11 1/4 lb)
- Length: 1,162 mm (45 3/4 in)
- Barrel length: 660 mm (26 in)/610 mm (24 in)
- Cartridge: .223 Remington.300 Winchester Magnum.308 Winchester.338 Lapua Magnum
- Action: Bolt-action
- Maximum firing range: 915 m (1,001 yd)
- Feed system: 4-round internal box magazine
- Sights: Leupold 3.5–10×40 mm black matte scope

The Savage 10FP is a bolt-action sniper rifle manufactured by Savage Arms and based on the Savage Model 110 rifle. There are seven variants of this rifle, each designated with an "LE" code signifying that it is part of the Law Enforcement Series. Most 10FP series rifles are configured with the AccuTrigger, matte-blued barreled action, heavy free-floating and button-rifled barrel, oversized bolt handle, internal box magazine (holding 4 rounds), and three swivel studs for sling and bipod mounting.

The Savage 10FP is similar to the Savage 110FP rifles and differ only in the action lengths and in the calibers used. The 10FP is designated a "short action" meaning cartridges similar in length to the .308 Winchester, while the 110FP is considered a "long action" meaning cartridges similar in length to the .30-06 Springfield. Both are bolt-action, rotating bolt rifles, with dual-lug bolts and integral, non-detachable magazines, and both are available in left-handed models.

== Trigger ==
The 10FP comes with the Savage Arms developed "Accutrigger". This trigger is intended to give a shooter the flexibility to set trigger pull to individual preference without having to pay a gunsmith to adjust it. The trigger can be adjusted from 6.5 to 26 N (1.5 to 6 lbf). Savage claims that even when adjusted to its lowest setting, the AccuTrigger is completely safe and cannot accidentally discharge during normal use from being jarred or dropped when maintained and adjusted as intended. The AccuTrigger offers a relatively short lock time of 1.6 milliseconds favoring accurate shooting.

=== Adjustment ===
Savage says adjustment of the AccuTrigger is a simple process. Removal of the stock is necessary where rotation of an adjustment spring is required. This is accomplished utilizing the Savage supplied tool. The AccuTrigger has a single adjustment location and is designed so it cannot be adjusted below the minimum setting. This adjustment feature is yet another example of the built-in customization design of this rifle. Customization allows users to adjust the rifle to their own personal comforts and preferences which can equate to accuracy improvement.

== Current models ==
Savage 10FP model types
Model No.	Caliber	Overall length	Barrel length	Weight	Stock (with studs)	Sights
10FP	.308 Win..223 Rem.	1,000 or 1,100 mm (40 or 44 in)	510 or 610 mm (20 or 24 in)	3,900 g (8.5 lb)	Black synthetic	Drilled and tapped for scope
10FLP Left-handed	.308 Win..223 Rem.	1,100 mm (44 in)	610 mm (24 in)	3,900 g (8.5 lb)	Black synthetic	Drilled and tapped for scope
10FP Choate	.308 Win..223 Rem.	1,111 mm (43.75 in)	660 mm (26 in)	5,100 g (11.25 lb)	Black synthetic Choate adjustable stock w/accessory rail	Drilled and tapped for scope
10FP Folding Choate	.308 Win.	1,022 mm (40.25 in)	510 mm (20 in)	4,800 g (10.5 lb)	Black synthetic Choate folding stock w/accessory rail	Drilled and tapped for scope
10FP LE2B McMillan	.308 Win.	1,180 mm (46.5 in)	610 mm (24 in)	4,500 g (10 lb)	McMillan fiberglass tactical stock	Drilled and tapped for scope
10FP HS Precision	.308 Win.	1,111 mm (43.75 in)	610 mm (24 in)	4,500 g (10 lb)	Black synthetic HS-Precision tactical stock	Drilled and tapped for scope
10FPXP HS Precision	.308 Win.	1,175 mm (46.25 in)	610 mm (24 in)	5,000 g (11 lb)	Black synthetic HS-Precision tactical stock	Leupold 3.5-10×40mm black matte scope with Mil Dot reticle and flip open lens covers, Farrell Picatinny Rail Base, Harris bipod and Storm heavy duty case included.

== Operators ==
- Philippines: Philippine National Police Counter Terrorism Unit version and Special Action Force version. Acquired as the Ferfrans TSR2, using the Savage 10FCP base unit with modifications and features added by FERFRANS.Delivered in 2011.

== See also ==
- Savage Model 110
- Savage Model 110 BA
- List of firearms
