= Steyr LP 10 =

Steyr LP 10 Silver
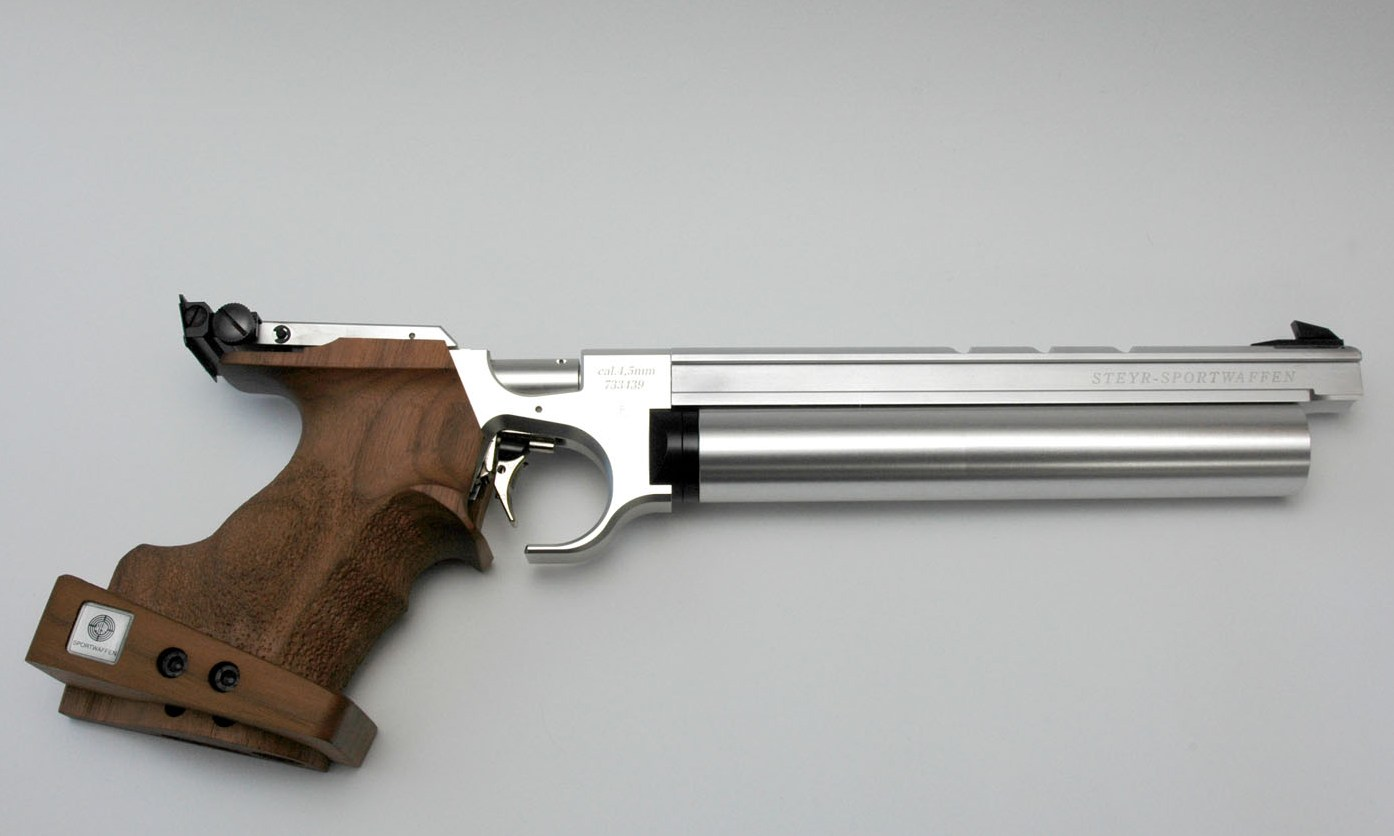
- Steyr LP 10 Silver
- Type: PCP air pistol
- Place of origin: Austria

Service history
- Used by: 10 m air pistol shooters

Production history
- Manufacturer: Steyr Sportwaffen GmbH
- Produced: 2000 -
- Variants: LP 10 E

Specifications
- Mass: 0.968 kg (2.13 lb) (empty weight, without barrel weights); 1.06 kg (2.34 lb) (total weight, with filled cylinder)
- Length: 400 mm (15.75 in)
- Barrel length: 227 mm (8.94 in)
- Width: 50 mm (1.97 in)
- Height: 142 mm (5.6 in)
- Cartridge: 4.5 mm (0.177 in) diabolo air gun pellets
- Action: Pre-Charged Pneumatic
- Muzzle velocity: 160 m/s approximately (adjustable)
- Feed system: single air gun pellet
- Sights: open, fully adjustable

The Steyr LP 10 is a discontinued single shot 4.5 mm (0.177 in) calibre pre-charged pneumatic air pistol designed for the ISSF 10 metre air pistol discipline. It was manufactured by Steyr Sportwaffen GmbH of Austria.

The LP10 was introduced in 2000 and was subsequently used to win multiple Olympic and ISSF World Championship titles, setting Olympic and World Records in the process. It was superseded by the Steyr evo 10.

== History ==
Following its introduction in 2000, the LP 10 prove itself to be a competitive match air pistol. It was used by Jin Jong-oh to set a men's world record of 594/600 in 2009, which remained unbroken as of August 2026.

LP10s were used to win both gold medals in the men's and women's 2012 Summer Olympics, 2010 ISSF World Shooting Championships, 2008 Summer Olympics, 2006 ISSF World Shooting Championships, 2004 Summer Olympics and 2002 ISSF World Shooting Championships. In ISSF World Cup events, competitors equipped with LP 10s also won multiple medals.

== Design details ==
The pistol uses dehumidified compressed air as propellant for match grade wadcutter air gun pellets. This is stored in compressed-air cylinders that have a maximum filling pressure of 200 bar and built-in pressure gauges that indicate the current pressure level in the cylinder. The air for actual shooting is drawn from the compressed-air storage cylinder and reduced by a reduction valve to the pistol's working pressure of about 55 bar. According to Steyr, their compressed-air cylinders have storage capacity for about 180 shots.

A distinctive feature designed by Steyr called the stabilizing system incorporates a small tungsten piston to compensate for the impulse caused by the movement of the pellet and some other internal parts in an attempt to stabilize the pistol during discharge. Further, the barrel has three holes drilled on top along its length and a muzzle brake to counteract muzzle rise and reduce recoil. Finally, the muzzle velocity of the pellets is adjustable to minimize movement and balance shifts during discharge.

Like all air pistols designed for the 10 metre air pistol event, it has fully adjustable sights. The rear sight is adjustable without tools for elevation and windage. The depth of the rear notch is adjustable with a screwdriver to lengthen or shorten the sight line length from 316 up to 365 mm.

The pistol has two-stage, three-dimensionally adjustable trigger which can be adjusted for overtravel, first stage weight and travel, second stage weight and sear engagement. The trigger pull weight is factory-adjusted to 500 gram (17.6 oz) to comply with the ISSF 10 metre air pistol rules. The trigger mechanism also has dry fire capability. Dry fire means a shooter can practice/simulate shooting without actually firing a pellet or seeping any air from a mounted pre-compressed air cylinder.

The standard anatomically shaped grip made by Morini has an adjustable palm shelf. Rake and rotation can be adjusted with screws under the grip.

Visually, the LP 10 is set apart from most similar pistols due to its barrel shroud. The pistol comes with four 10-gram barrel weights that fit in slots on either side of the barrel.

The pistol is currently delivered in a polymer pistol carrying case with manuals, two pre-compressed air cylinders with built-in pressure gauges, some spare air -sealing parts, an air filling adapter and adjustment tools. Older pistols were delivered in a simple cardbox case with pre-compressed air cylinders and a separate pressure gauge. Steyr factory accessories like an ambidextrous grip, additional 10- and 25-gram barrel weights, various front sight blades, a CO_{2} conversion kit, long and short compressed-propellant cylinders, and air and CO_{2} fill adapters are available. Aftermarket accessories from other manufacturers, like target pistol grips that will fit the LP 10, are also available.

== Variants ==
In 2009 Steyr released the LP 10 E, which has an electronic trigger. According to the manufacturer two standard 1.5 V AAA batteries provide enough electric capacity for 25,000 shots/trigger release cycles.
In 2016 Steyr released the evo featuring a mechanical trigger and the evo E, which has an electronic trigger as successor model. The evo pistols are technically based on the LP 10 line and feature several evolutionary improvements. According to the manufacturer the rechargeable battery in the evo E provides enough electric capacity for 10,000 shots/trigger release cycles. Besides these pistols the Steyr evo line also includes the evo Compact and evo E Compact shortened somewhat lighter variants.
The Steyr LP 2 is an updated (compressed-air) LP-1P that complements the LP 10 in the Steyr LP line. Slightly less expensive and lacking a few of the LP 10's refinements, it is still a very high quality target air pistol.
The Steyr LP 50 is a 5-shot semi-automatic air pistol that shares many parts with the LP 10 and can be used for the training of dynamic pistol disciplines.
The Steyr LP 1 is the predecessor of the LP 10, available both for use with compressed air and with compressed CO_{2} as propellant.

== See also ==
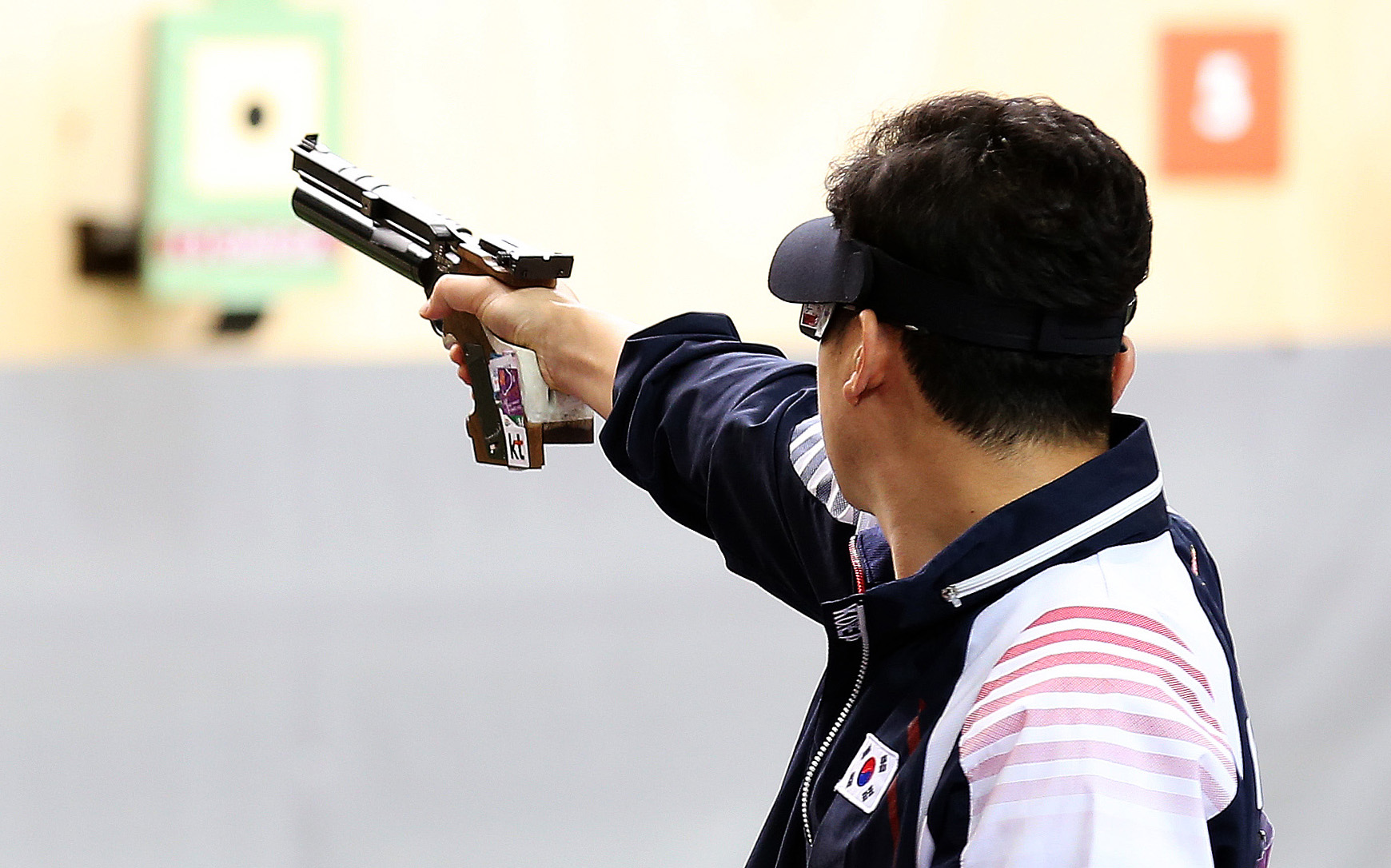
Triple Olympic champion Jin Jong-oh with his Steyr LP10E competing at the 2012 Summer Olympics

- Jin Jong-oh, world record holder since April 12, 2009 and 2012 Summer Olympics Champion (LP 10E).
- Guo Wenjun, 2012 Summer Olympics and 2008 Summer Olympics Champion.
- Tomoyuki Matsuda, 2010 World Champion.
- Zorana Arunovic, 2010 World Champion.
- Pang Wei, 2008 Summer Olympics Champion and 2006 World Champion.
- Natalia Paderina, 2006 World Champion.
- Wang Yifu, 2004 Summer Olympics Champion and 1992 Summer Olympics Champion (LP 1).
- Olena Kostevych, 2004 Summer Olympics Champion and 2002 World Champion.
- Mikhail Nestruev, 2002 World Champion.
- Svetlana Smirnova, world record holder since May 23, 1998 (LP 1).
- Marina Logvinenko, 1992 Summer Olympics Champion (LP 1).
- Jasna Šekarić, 1990 (LP 1) and 1994 World Champion (LP 1).
