= Savage Arms =

American firearms company

- Type: Private
- Industry: Firearms
- Founded: 1894; 132 years ago
- Headquarters: Westfield, Massachusetts
- Key people: Chris Bezzina (CEO)
- Products: Rifles, shotguns
- Brands: Stevens Arms
- Owner: Smith and Wesson (2026-present)
- Website: www.savagearms.com

Savage Arms is an American gunmaker based in Westfield, Massachusetts, with operations in both the United States and Canada. Savage makes a variety of rimfire and centerfire rifles, as well as handguns and Stevens single-shot rifles and shotguns. The company is best known for the Model 99 lever-action rifle, no longer in production, and the .300 Savage. Savage was a subsidiary of Vista Outdoor until 2019 when it was spun off.

== History ==
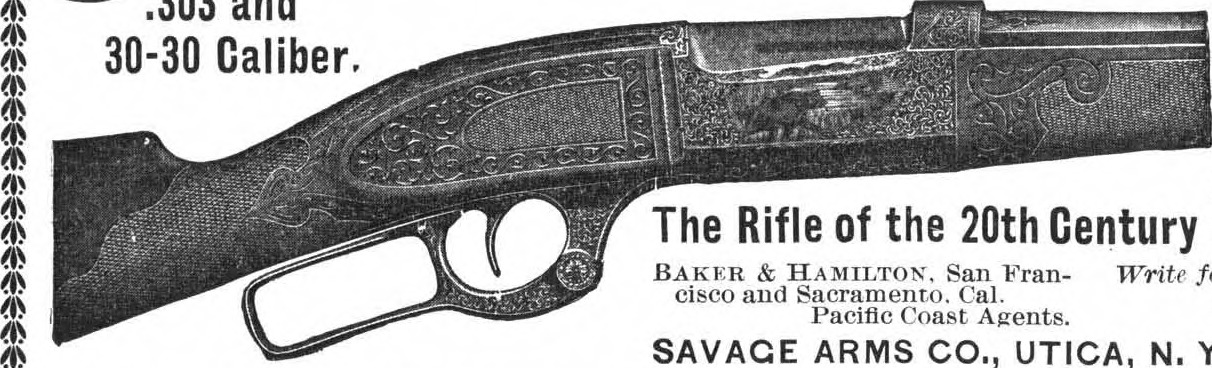
The Savage 99 in Scientific American Volume 85 Number 10 (September 1901)

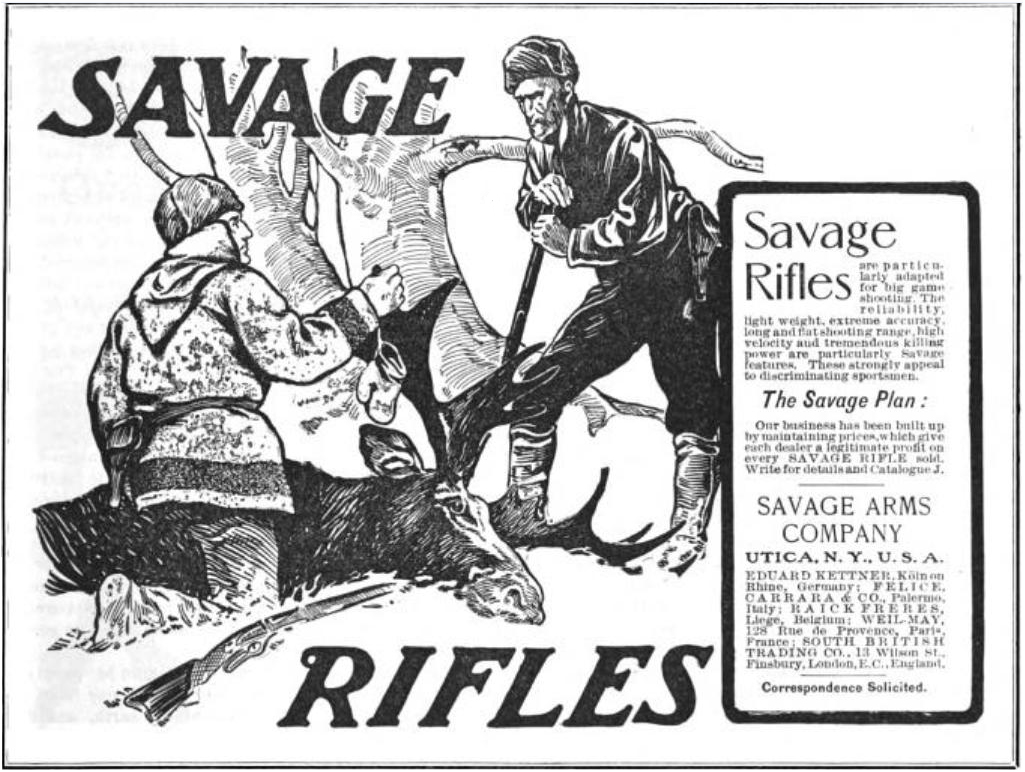
Savage Arms Company - Utica, New York - 1904

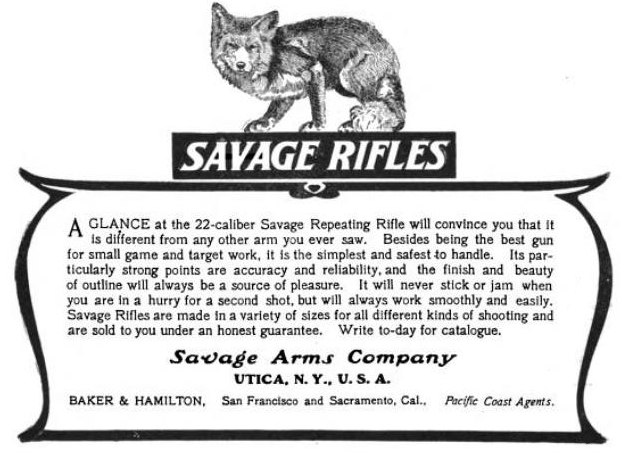
Savage Arms Company - Rifles - Utica, New York - 1904

Savage Arms was founded in 1894 by Arthur Savage in Utica, New York. Within 20 years, the company manufactured rifles, handguns, and ammunition. Savage introduced the first hammerless lever-action rifle, the Model 1895, derived from Arthur Savage's Model 1892 rifle that he had designed for Colt in a failed bid for a US Army rifle contract that instead was won by the Krag–Jørgensen design. The Model 1895 won a New York National Guard contract, but the contract was cancelled due to political controversy.

Savage was one of six companies to participate in the United States Army trials for a .45 caliber semi-automatic pistol, and was named one of the two finalists before losing out to Colt's design, which would become the M1911 pistol. Savage marketed a series of .32 and .380 caliber pocket pistols, the Models 1907, 1915, and 1917 based on the same patents as their .45 caliber prototype.

In 1915-1916 company chief designer Charles A. Nelson directed the design of new bolt-action rifles for the US military to supplement M1903 Springfield, but in the run-up of the US entrance in WWI US Army decided to adopt Pattern 1914 Enfield which was already in the serial production for the British, and Savage was tasked with machine gun production instead. Savage merged with the Driggs-Seabury Ordnance Company during World War I and produced Lewis machine guns at Driggs-Seabury's former plant in Sharon, Pennsylvania. Savage also produced Model 1899 muskets for the Montreal Home Guard during World War I.

A 1979 Savage Arms catalogue claimed that in 1919, Arthur Savage was approached by Chief Lame Deer to buy rifles for his tribe in New York. Lame Deer offered to allow Savage to use his image as its logo in exchange for discounted rifles and an annual fee. As of 2018, Savage Arms was still paying the annual fee. However, the Savage Model 1907 already bore the logo (including those made prior to 1919), and a catalog from 1903 shows Savage Arms using a similar illustration as well.

=== Interwar ===
In 1920 Savage restarted the production of Model 1899 as Model 99, introduced new Model 1920 bolt-action rifle based on Nelson's WWI prototypes modified for cartridges shorter than military rifle ones that would fit in Model 99 magazine, and introduced a new cartridge of that type: .300 Savage .

Also in the same year, Savage bought Stevens Arms of Chicopee, Massachusetts. In July 1921, a mortgage securing five promissory notes, each for $21,416, was filed in the County Clerk's office in Utica showing that the Savage Arms Corporation had purchased a "number of buildings erected by the government" during World War I for increasing the output of Lewis machine guns at the plant. The buildings included two large four-story brick structures, five large storage sheds, and one office building, a concrete mill building, steel storage building, power extension plant, shooting gallery and steel water tank with a capacity of 100,000 gallons. The notes were due in 1927. In 1929 Savage acquired the A.H. Fox Gun company of Philadelphia and moved production to Utica.

In 1939, Savage introduced the Model 24 combination gun (a configuration uncommon in the U.S.), which sold over a million copies. Savage was one of the few American makers of affordable double-barrel shotguns including the Fox Sterlingworth, Fox Model B, and Stevens Model 311 and produced rifles and shotguns under house brand names for large store chains.

=== Second World War ===
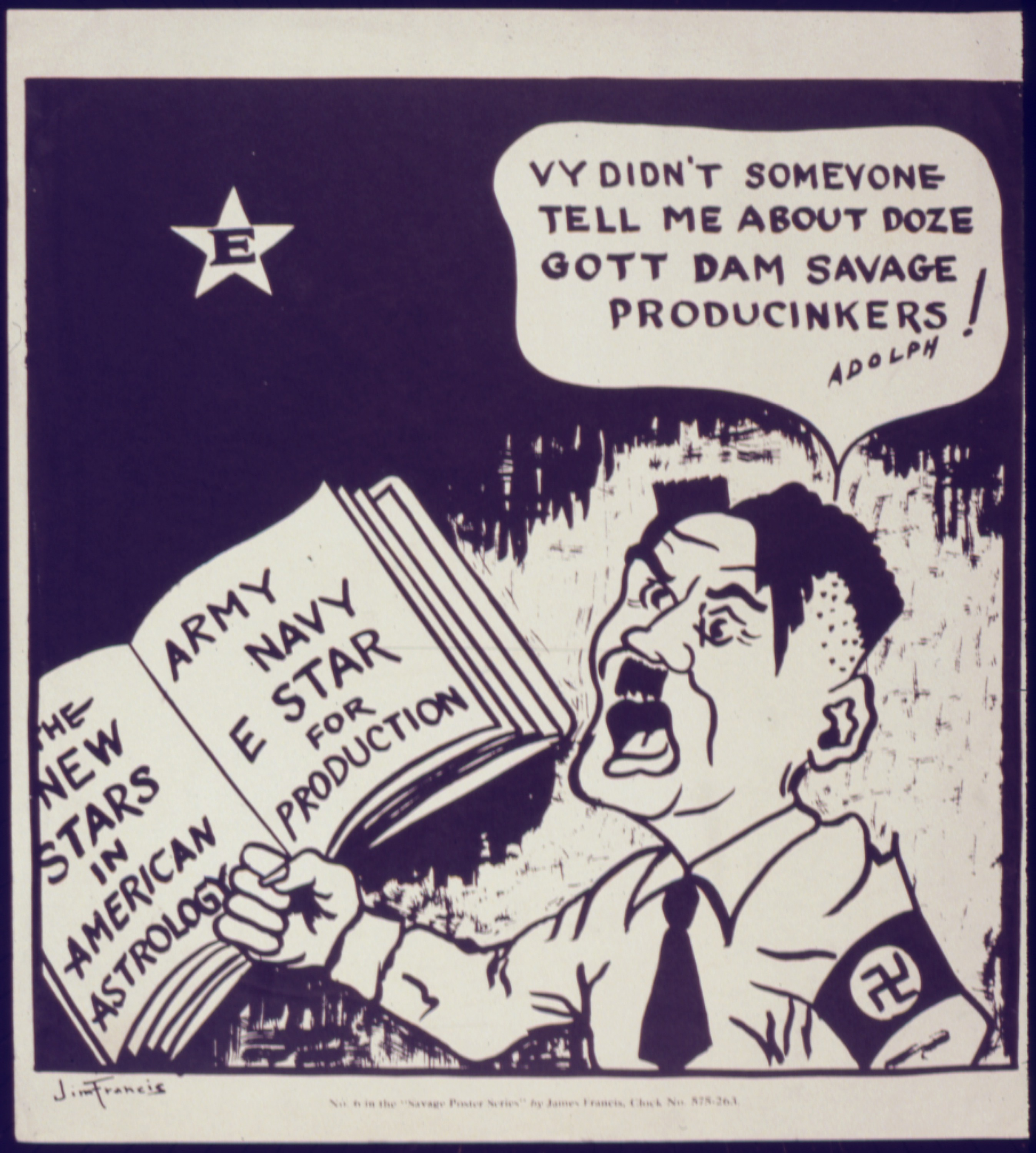
WWII propaganda poster depicting Führer Adolf Hitler from the War Production Board praising Savage ca. 1942-1943

During World War II, Savage turned again to military production, making heavy munitions. Savage made most of the Thompson submachine guns used in World War II. Savage also produced the British No. 4 Lee–Enfield bolt-action rifle; though marked "U.S. PROPERTY," these rifles were never used by the US military and were instead sent to Britain and other allied armies under the Lend-Lease program. As quality wood was reserved for military gun stock production, Savage produced some Model 24 .22/.410 combo guns and Model 94 single barrel shotguns with stocks molded from Tenite plastic.

=== Post-war ===
After the war, it produced the model 67 and model 69 pump shotguns, including the model 69N stainless steel tactical pump shotgun. A variety of owners ran the company from the 1960s to the 1980s. Savage eventually ran into financial trouble in 1988 and filed for bankruptcy protection.

In addition to firearms, Savage Arms Corporation also sold power lawn mowers during this period.

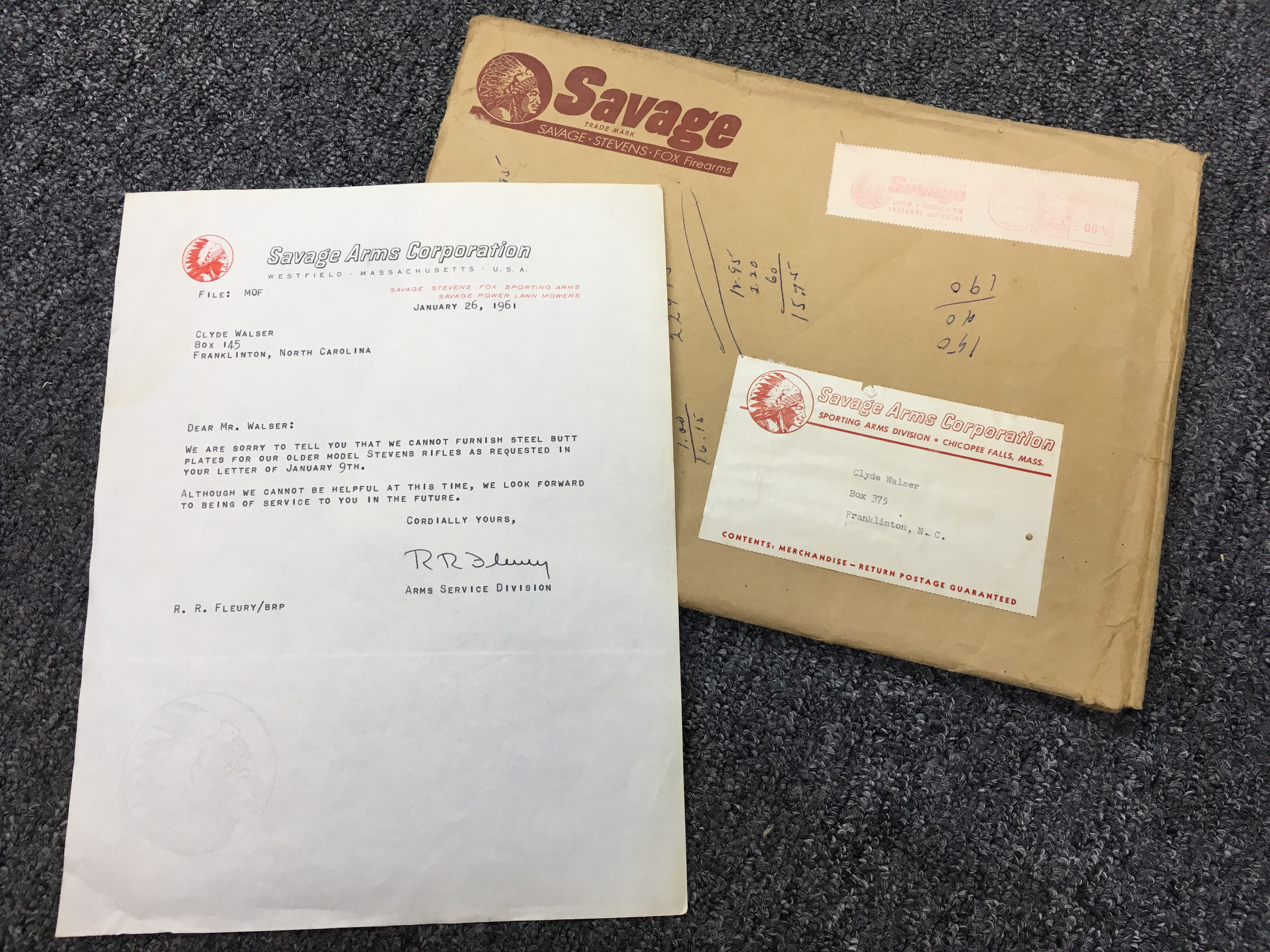
Prior to the creation of the Internet, Savage customers could write letters to the Savage Arms requesting parts.

=== 21st century ===
In 2002, the company started selling a factory-installed, safe, user-adjustable trigger, called the AccuTrigger. The AccuStock, an aluminum stock embedded rail system to further enhance action stability and accuracy, was introduced by Savage in 2009.

Savage was named the Manufacturer of the Year by the Shooting Industry Academy of Excellence in 2003.

The Savage 93R17 BTVS was awarded the "Best New Rifle" in the "Best of the Best" presentation by Shooting Times, Sporting Gun, and Shooting Gazette magazines May 15, 2007, at the E. J. Churchill Shooting School in the U.K.

Ron Coburn, then chairman and CEO of Savage Sports Corporation was honored by SHOT Business Magazine and Time4Media outdoor media group as their "2007 Man of the Year". On February 5, 2013, Coburn announced that he was stepping down after a 25-year tenure as chairman and CEO of Savage Sports Corporation. On February 6, 2013, Savage Sports announced the appointment of Ron Johnson as its new Chief Executive Officer. Johnson most recently served as President of the Sporting Group within Alliant Techsystems ("ATK").

Vista Outdoor markets firearm accessories and ammunition under brands that include Weaver Optics, Federal Premium, Speer Ammo, and Blazer. ATK, the predecessor of Vista Outdoor, announced the purchase of Savage for $315 million on May 13, 2013. With the purchase, Johnson remained with Bowtech Archery, who was not part of the sale, and Al Kasper began tenure as CEO.

As of July 2018, Vista Outdoor was attempting to sell Savage Arms as part of a larger restructuring. Vista Outdoor said that expanding Savage's offerings to include handguns was too expensive. As of 2018, Savage Arms' sales made up just 7% of Vista Outdoor's overall business.

As of May 2018, Savage Arms had 367 workers at its factory in Westfield, Massachusetts.

On July 9, 2019, Vista Outdoor completed the sale of Savage Arms and Stevens Arms for $170 million to a group of investors led by Savage's management. Vista received immediate gross proceeds of $158 million and a $12-million five-year note. Vista said it will use this money, after paying associated taxes, to reduce its debt.

Chris Bezzina became the CEO of Savage Arms in 2023.

Smith and Wesson purchased Savage in a stock, cash deal valued at $160M on October 21st, 2026.

== Products ==
=== Shotguns ===
The S1200 is the first semi-automatic shotgun sold under the Stevens brand. The S1200 uses an inertia-driven action that uses the recoil force of the gun to cycle shells. The S1200 weighs 6.8 pounds. Options for 26-inch and 28-inch barrels are available.

As of 2018, Savage sold the 212 (12 gauge) and 220 (20 gauge) model shotguns. These models can be fired accurately at ranges up to 200 yards. This accuracy is mostly due to their bolt-action design. These models use Savage's AccuTrigger system to customize trigger pull weight. These models are specifically designed for firing shotgun slugs in addition to bird shot. Both models come with two-round detachable magazines. In 2019, Savage released variants of the 212 and 220 shotguns designed specifically for hunting turkeys.

In 2020 Savage released the "Savage Renegauge" also intended for turkey hunting. It makes use of a "Dual Regulating Inline Valve" in order to reduce the recoil. The gun weighs 8lbs and was released at a suggested price of $1,550.

In 2023, Savage released the Stevens 560 Field 12-gauge semi-automatic hunting shotgun.

=== Handguns ===
Savage also manufactures handguns, such as the Stance XR and Model 1911.

==== Stance XR ====
In the front, the Stance XR has a Glock-sight-compatible threaded tenon, while in the rear, a dovetail is included.

==== Model 1911 ====
Savage's 1911 handguns were released in 2023.

=== Rimfire rifles ===
==== Model 64 ====
The Model 64 series is a semi-automatic .22 LR rifle made in Lakefield, Ontario, Canada. It operates on a simple blowback action. It is targeted towards beginning shooters, small game hunters, and budget-minded plinking. It is one of the most popular plinkers in the United States due to high accuracy, being chambered in cheap, common, and readily available .22 Long Rifle, and the low price. It is unusual among semiautomatic 22s, and traditional (non-bullpup) semiautomatic rifles in general, in that it is available in a true left-handed version (left handed safety, charging handle, and ejector).

==== A Series ====
The A Series is a new family of semi-automatic rimfire rifles aimed to replace/compete with the aging Model 64 series.

- A17

The A17 is a semi-automatic rimfire rifle that uses .17 HMR ammunition. CCI, another Vista Outdoor subsidiary, specially engineered ammunition for the A17 in cooperation with Savage to overcome safety and functioning problems associated with more powerful small caliber rimfire ammunition being used in blowback semi-automatic weapons. This rifle also uses the unique Savage delayed blowback system. It uses Savage's unique user-adjustable AccuTrigger system that allows the pressure need to affect a trigger pull to be changed. The safety blocks both the hammer and trigger and locks the bolt open when depressed. In an American Rifleman review, Mark Keefe praised the A17, which Savage designed around the .17 HMR, rather than adapting a rifle to it, while also remaining competitively priced.

In early 2016, Savage released the A17 Sporter, A17 Target Sporter, and A17 Target Sporter Thumbhole variants. The Sporter and Target Sporter have heavy barrels and gray wood-laminate stocks. The Thumbhole has a heavy fluted barrel and a gray wood-laminate thumbhole stock. The A17 was named Rifle of the Year in the NRA Publications' 2016 Golden Bullseye Awards.

- A22

The A22 is a semi-automatic rimfire rifle that uses the .22 Long Rifle ammunition. It comes with a 10-round rotary magazine and uses Savage's patented AccuTrigger. The standard model A22 comes with a 21" carbon steel barrel with iron sights, but also comes with sightless 22" stainless steel barrel (FSS) or 22" carbon steel varmint barrel (Pro Varmint or Target Thumbhole). It was created to compete with other popular .22 semi-automatic rifle models, including the Marlin 795, Remington 597 and Ruger 10/22.

- A22 Magnum

The A22 Magnum is a semi-automatic rimfire rifle with a design similar to the A17, but using .22 WMR ammunition. It comes with a 10-round rotary magazine, a steel receiver, and Savage's user-adjustable AccuTrigger for changing the trigger pull weight. This rifle also uses the unique Savage delayed blowback system.

==== Model 93 ====
The Model 93 is a series of "magnum" bolt-action rimfire rifles chambered for the .22 WMR ammunition and its neck-down derivative caliber .17 HMR.

- Model 93
- Model 93R17

==== Mark II Series ====
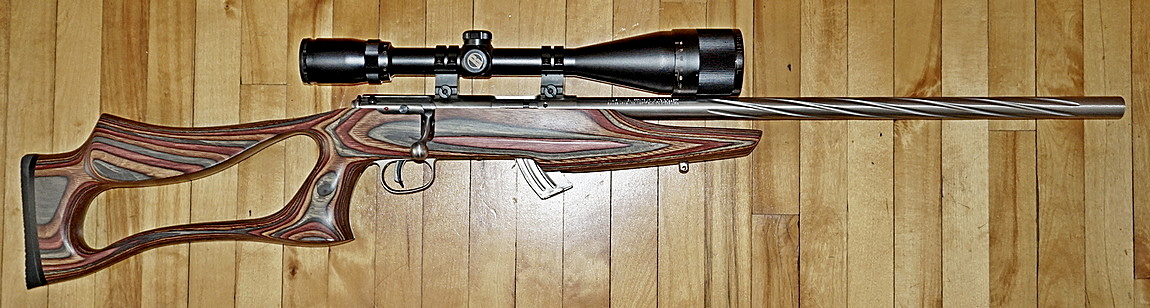
Savage Mark ll BSEV .22lr with Bushnell scope

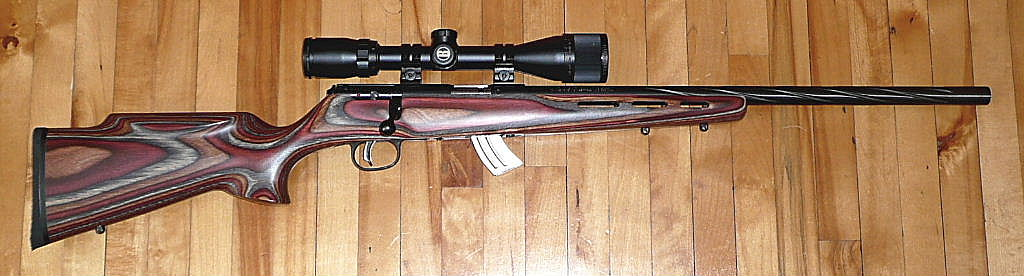
Savage Mark ll BRJ .22lr with Bushnell scope

The Mark II Series is a family of bolt-action rimfire rifles chambered mainly for the .22 LR ammunition, as well as the .17 HM2 for its FV varmint model.

==== B Series ====
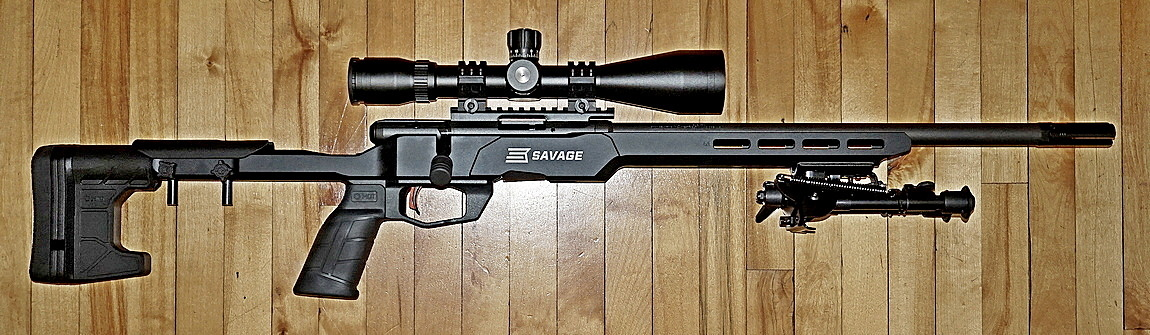
Savage B22 Precision with Bushnell scope and bipod

The B Series is a new family of bolt-action rimfire rifles introduced in 2017 to replace/compete with the old Mark II series, chambered for the .17 HMR, .22 LR and the .22 WMR ammunitions fed via a 10-round rotary magazine shared with the A Series.

- B17
- B22
- B22 Magnum

==== Rascal ====
Rascal is a bolt-action single-shot rimfire rifle chambered for .22 LR ammunition.

=== Combination guns ===
In 2016, Savage arms introduced the Model 42 Takedown combination gun. It breaks down via a one-button, one-push mechanism. The over and under barrels are 20" long. The top barrel fires .22 LR or .22 WMR rimfire ammunition, while the bottom barrel fires .410 bore shotgun shells. The lower barrel is chambered for 3" shells, allowing the use of both 3" and 2.5" birdshot, buckshot, slugs, and self-defense rounds. The rifle barrel on top has open sights. The Model 42 has a black, matte, synthetic stock.

=== Bolt-action rifles ===
==== Model 110 ====
The Model 110 is a repeating bolt-action rifle. The Model 110 was designed by Nicholas L. Brewer in 1958 and was patented posthumously in 1963. It has been in continuous production since that time, and with the closing of Winchester's New Haven, Connecticut, plant in 2007, the Model 110 has passed the Winchester Model 70 as the oldest continuously manufactured bolt-action rifle in America.

In 2018, Savage released the Model 110 Tactical variant. It can be chambered in .308 Winchester, 6.5mm Creedmoor, 6mm Creedmoor, and 300 Winchester Magnum. The Tactical variant includes Savage's AccuFit system allowing shooters to customize the comb height and length-of-pull.

==== Model 10FP and Model 110FP ====
The Savage 10FP is a bolt-action rifle based on the Model 110 rifle. There are seven variants of this rifle, each designated with an "LE" code signifying that it is part of the Law Enforcement Series. Most 10FP series rifles are configured with AccuTrigger, matte-blued barreled action, heavy free-floating and button-rifled barrel, oversized bolt handle, an internal box magazine (holding four rounds), and three swivel studs for sling and bipod mounting. The Savage 10FP is similar to the Savage 110FP rifle and differ only in the action lengths and in the calibers used. The 10FP is"short action," using cartridges similar in length to the .308 Winchester. The 110FP is considered a "long action," meaning it uses cartridges similar in length to the .30-06 Springfield. Both are bolt-action, rotating bolt rifles, with dual-lug bolts and integral, non-detachable magazines, and both are available in left-handed models.

==== Model 10/110 ====
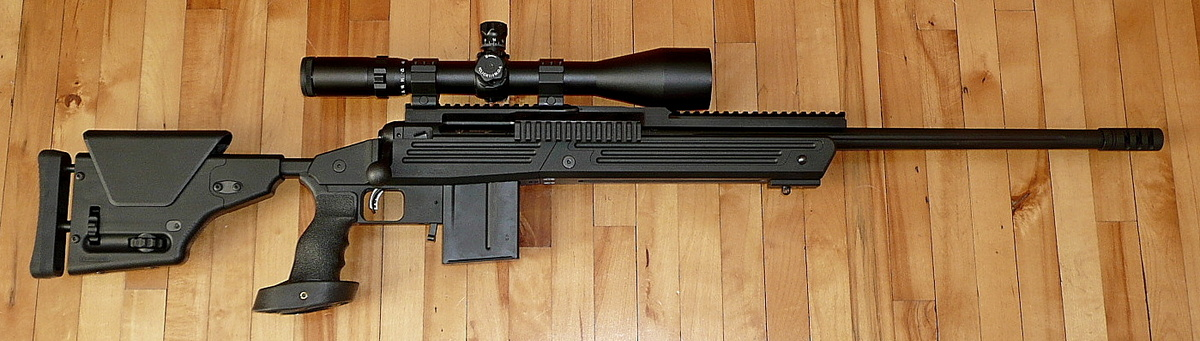
Savage 10BA .308 Win with Millett scope

The Predator Hunter Max 1 has a fluted carbon steel barrel and synthetic stock finished in a camouflage pattern. It comes in variants chambered with .204 Ruger, 22-250 Remington, .223 Remington, .243 Remington, .260 Remington, 6.5 Creedmoor and .308 Winchester. All variants have a 24-inch barrels, except the .223 which has a 22-inch barrel. Accustock, AccuTrigger, a soft rubber recoil pad, a three-position safety, and a four-round magazine are all included.

==== Model 11/111 ====
The Hog Hunter variant chambered in 338 Winchester Magnum, is a bolt-action rifle designed for hunting wild boar. It is a variant of the Model 11/111 design. Models are available for short-action .223 Remington and .308 Winchester, .338 Federal, and .350 Legend cartridges. It has a 20-inch, medium-contour, heavy barrel with a threaded end. The Hog Hunter comes standard with v-notch iron sights. The AccuTrigger allows the shooter to adjust the strength required for a trigger pull. The Hog Hunter weighs about seven pounds.

The Long Ranger Hunter variant is available chambered in .260 Remington, .300 Winchester, .338 Federal, .338 Lapua Magnum, 6.5 Creedmoor, 6.5 x .284 Norma, and 7mm Remington. All versions except the Lapua Magnum have 26-inch carbon steel barrels with an adjustable muzzle brake, which can be twisted open or closed. Except for the .338 Lapua Magnum, each version has hinged metal floorplates. The Lapua Magnum has a fixed muzzle brake and a detachable box magazine. The receiver is drilled and tapped for mounting a scope. AccuStock and AccuTrigger come standard. The weight of the Long Range Hunter varies from 8.4 pounds to 9.25 pounds depending on how it is chambered.

==== Other variants ====
The Model 112 Magnum Target rifle is a single-shot bolt-action rifle for long-range shooters. It chambers 338 Lapua Magnum cartridges. It is built around the Magnum Target Action, has a pillar-bedded 26-inch heavy barrel, and uses the Target AccuTrigger system for adjusting the amount of force necessary to affect a trigger pull. The Target AccuTrigger can be adjusted by the shooter to require a pull as low as six ounces. The Model 112 weights 12 pounds and is 49.8 inches long.

The Lightweight Hunter weighs only 5.65 pounds. Savage achieved this weight by using a light-contour 20-inch barrel, spiral-fluting the bolt, machining excess metal from the receiver as well as milling cuts in the stock. Weight is also saved by using a polymer-bottom detachable four-round box magazine. Variants are available in .223 Remington, .243 Remington, .270 Winchester, .308 Winchester, and 7mm-08 Remington. The barrel has a matte finish. The stock is oil-finished walnut. The total length of the rifle is 40.25 inches. AccuTrigger is included.

The Model 116 has variants chambered for .338 Winchester and .375 Ruger. It has a 20-inch stainless steel barrel and a stainless action. The receiver is drilled and tapped for mounting a scope. It comes standard with adjustable LPA open sights. The stock is a black polymer. The bolt hand is oversized so that it can be used while wearing gloves. An internal box magazine holds three rounds. The overall length of the rifle is 41.5 inches. It weighs 7.6 pounds. Savage's standard three-position safety and AccuTrigger system come standard.

The BA Stealth was named one of American Hunter's "Top New Rifles" for 2016. The BA Stealth can be chambered in .308 Winchester. It has a solid aluminum chassis and an adjustable polymer stock. It includes the AccuTrigger system. The Axis II XP Stainless is bolt-action hunting rifle with a stainless barreled action and a bore-sighted Weaver scope. It is made in eight common calibers. It includes AccuTrigger. It was named one of American Hunter's "Top New Rifles" for 2016.

==== Axis II XP ====
The Axis II XP line of rifles come with Bushnell Banner scopes and are chambered in a variety of ammunition. The stock is synthetic. The barrel is mated to the receiver with thread-in headspacing. This allows for precision fabrication while keeping costs down. The use of a floating bolt head also maintains precision while helping to keep the rifle affordable. The Axis II XP has a four-round magazine and weights approximately 6.8 pounds. The barrel length is 22 inches.

==== Impulse ====
A fully ambidextrous straight-pull bolt-action rifle introduced in early 2021 with a variety of calibers and models.

=== Modern sporting rifles ===
==== MSR-15 and variants ====
MSR-15 variants are all modern sporting rifles based on the AR platform.

Savage released the MSR-15 Recon LRP in 2018. It has an adjustable gas block and an 18-inch-long barrel that make it suitable for use at long range. The gas block can be customized for use with specific kinds of ammunition. Variants come chambered in 6.8 SPC, 22 Nosler, and .224 Valkyrie. The rifle has an extended length of 38.5 inches and a collapsed length of 35.25 inches. The rifle weighs 7.5 pounds.

Savage released the MSR-15 Long Range in 2018. The most salient feature of this variant is its 22-inch barrel. The barrel length was chosen to achieve maximum accuracy with .224 Valkyrie ammunition from long range.

==== Left-handed firearms ====
Savage Arms focuses primarily on specialty firearms, offering products designed to meet specific market needs, including firearms intended for left-handed shooters.

Savage was the first major manufacturer to produce a left-handed hunting rifle in significant quantities, starting in 1959.

Savage Arms sells 18 different firearms for left-handed shooters with products designed for big game, law enforcement, target competition, and predator hunting, including left-handed slug shotguns and bolt-action and semi-auto rimfire rifles. Savage generally releases its products as right-handed models with a left-handed version to follow a few years later. Models not available with a stock left-handed version can usually be made to order. Savage can convert most of its products to left-handed versions because most of its receivers, bolt releases, and safeties are designed symmetrically. Savage can easily convert its products' designs by changing the bolt assembly and moving the ejection port to the opposite side, but most of its competitors have to design completely new receivers. Savage's machine tools are likewise set up to quickly and easily switch from producing right-handed products to left-handed ones and back again.

=== Discontinued products ===
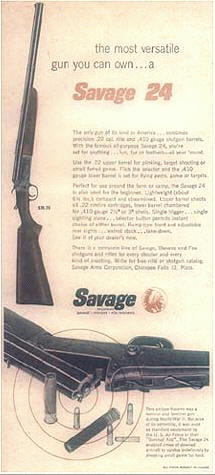
Advertisement for SAVAGE MODEL 24 circa 1956

Since Savage is one of the older American arms companies still in commercial production, it would be difficult to list the number of models no longer in production made by Savage under its own name and under tradenames for retail outlets. Those most notable and still in wide use today include:

- Shotguns
  - Stevens Model 520 Shotguns
  - Stevens Model 620 Shotguns
  - Model 720
  - Model 745
  - Model 67
  - Model 69
  - Model 755
  - Model 775
- Rifles
  - Savage Model 23AA Sporter
  - Savage Model 99
  - Savage Model 325
  - Savage Model 340
  - Savage Model 1920
- Combination guns
  - Savage Model 24
- Light machine guns
  - M1917 Lewis gun (2,500 in .30-06 Springfield, 1,050 in .303 British)

==== Ammunition ====
For most of its history, Savage made ammunition as well as firearms. Savage marketed a wide variety of calibers. The .303 Savage, .22 Savage Hi-Power, .250-3000 Savage, and .300 Savage are some of the more important ammunition types sold by the firm.

== Operations in Canada ==
Savage Arms' Canadian operations began as an independent enterprise called Lakefield Arms. It was founded in 1969 in Lakefield, Ontario where it remains as of 2020. The company was formed partially in response to the closure of a boat factory in the same town. The founding partners thought the laid-off factory workers' skills would be readily transferable to gun making. During its first year of operations, Lakefield Arms produced two different .22 caliber rifles for the Canadian market. The Mark II was a bolt-action rifle with a 10-round removable magazine. The Mark III was a semi-automatic rifle that also had a 10-round removable magazine. Both had wooden stocks. As of 2019, these designs were still the basis for the companies best-selling products.

In 1973, Lakefield Arms moved into a new factory on 2.5-acre parcel of land the company had purchased near Water Street in the same town. As of 2019, it remains at the same locations. 90 to 140 people are usually employed at this site depending on demand and the time of year. Savage Arms purchased Lakefield Arms in 1995.

According to company officials, the Canadian division of Savage Arms exports 97 percent of its rifles, mostly to the U.S., as of 1997. In an interview with a local newspaper reporter in 2019, a senior company official said that 200,000 to 300,000 guns per year are manufactured at Lakefield. The same official said roughly 85 percent of its output is exported to the United States, 5 percent is exported to other countries, and 10 percent is sold within Canada.

== See also ==
- List of modern armament manufacturers
