= Remington Model 673 =

- Type: Rifle
- Place of origin: United States

Production history
- Manufacturer: Remington Arms
- Produced: 2003–2004

Specifications
- Mass: 7.5 lb (3.4 kg)
- Length: 41.2 in (105 cm)
- Barrel length: 22 in (56 cm)
- Cartridge: .300 Rem SAUM; .350 Rem Mag; 6.5mm Rem Mag; .308 Win
- Action: Bolt-Action
- Sights: Iron, drilled & tapped for scope

The Model 673 was a bolt-action rifle introduced by Remington Arms in 2003 and discontinued in 2004. It is an updated version of the Remington Model 600 and Model 660. The company hails the weapon as the "ultimate guides' rifle", with features ranging from its laminated stock, ventilated rib, and iron sights. Its action is based on that of the Model Seven and features Remington's proprietary short action.
