= Remington XP-100 =

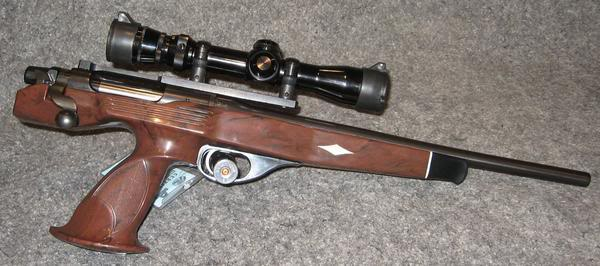
- The Remington XP-100
- Type: Bullpup bolt-action pistol
- Place of origin: United States

Production history
- Designer: Remington Arms Company
- Designed: 1961
- Manufacturer: Remington Arms Company
- Produced: 1963–1998
- Variants: XP-100 Varmint Special; XP-100 Silhouette; XP-100 Hunter; XP-100 Custom; XP-100R; XR-100 Rangemaster

Specifications
- Mass: 1.7 kg (3.7 lb) with iron sights and 270 mm (10.75") barrel
- Length: 360 mm or 460 mm (14 in or 18 in)
- Barrel length: 270 mm or 370 mm (10.75 in or 14.5 in)
- Cartridge: .221 Fireball.22-250 Remington.223 Remington.250 Savage; 6mm BR Remington; 7mm BR Remington; 7mm-08 Remington.308 Winchester.35 Remington
- Action: Bolt action
- Effective firing range: 200–300 m
- Maximum firing range: 300 m
- Feed system: Single shot 4-round internal magazine (XP-100R)
- Sights: Iron sights on original version, Optical scope

The Remington XP-100 (from eXperimental Pistol number 100) is a bolt-action pistol produced by Remington Arms from 1963 to 1998. The XP-100 was one of the first handguns designed for long-range shooting and introduced the .221 Fireball and 6×45mm. The XP-100 was noted for its accuracy and is still viewed as competitive today in the sport of handgun varminting, which it helped create, as well as in metallic silhouette shooting.

== Overview ==
The XP-100 was based on Remington's short action bolt action carbine, the Remington Model 40X, which influenced the later Remington Model 600 rifle. The XP-100 was initially introduced with a 10 3/4 in (270 mm) barrel set into a nylon stock with an unusual center-mounted grip. Chambered in .222 Remington in early prototypes, the short barrel produced significant noise and muzzle flash. Subsequently, the case was shortened to reduce powder capacity to a volume more suited to the shorter barrel of a pistol. The resulting cartridge, the .221 Fireball, produced factory-loaded velocities of over 825 m/s (2,700 ft/s) from the short barrel, and accuracy rivaling the parent .222 Remington, one of the most accurate cartridges made.

All but the XP-100R model were single-shot designs, while the XP-100R had a small internal magazine (holding four rounds), similar to most bolt-action rifles. The R model - for "repeater" - was made 1991–1997 in .223 Rem., .250 Savage, 7mm-08 Rem., .308 Win., .35 Rem., and 350 Rem. Mag. It was reintroduced in 1998, this time without sights, in .223 Rem., .22-250 Rem., .260 Rem., and .35 Rem.

Self-proclaimed JFK assassin James Files, also known as James Sutton, claimed that he had shot U.S. president John F Kennedy from the grassy knoll with a Fireball XP-100. He added that the CIA had provided it to him, before its commercial release.

== Model history ==
The XP-100 went through a number of changes during its production run, and many variations were only available through the Remington Custom shop. The most significant changes in the later versions were to barrel length, which went to 14 1/2 in (370 mm), and the grip location, which was moved to the rear of the stock. Stocks with a rear grip use standard Remington 700 triggers, while stocks with a center grip need a special trigger linkage system with a long transfer bar. The calibers changed; with the elimination of the original 10 3/4 in (270 mm) barrel, the reduced powder capacity was no longer such a requirement, and the chamberings switched to standard commercial rifle cartridges. By the time the XP-100 was canceled, it faced stiff competition from other bolt-action pistols such as the Savage Striker as well as the versatile Thompson Center Arms break-action Contender.

=== Model production by year ===
- XP-100 (1963–1985)
- XP-100 Varmint Special (1986–1992)
- XP-100 Silhouette (1980–1997)
- XP-100 Hunter (1993–1994)
- XP-100 Custom (1986–1997)
- XP-100R (1998)
- XR-100 (2005–Present)

=== Caliber production by year ===
- .221 Remington Fireball (1963–1985)
- 7 mm BR Remington (1980–1985)
- .223 Remington (1986–1997), (2005–Present in XR-100)
- .35 Remington (1986–1997)
- 350 Rem. Mag (1991–1997)
- .250 Savage (1990–1992) Custom Shop only
- 6 mm BR Remington (1990–1992) Custom Shop only
- .22-250 Remington (1992–1994) Custom Shop only, (2005–Present in XR-100)
- .308 Winchester (1992–1994) Custom Shop only
- 7 mm-08 Remington (1993–1994)
- .204 Ruger (2005–Present in XR-100)

=== Current production ===
The XP-100 action was used as the basis for a new single-shot rifle from Remington called the XR-100 Rangemaster.

While the XP-100 has disappeared from Remington's lineup (Remington is primarily a maker of rifles and shotguns), the .221 Fireball remains in production. The Model 700 rifle has been available since 2002 in a .221 Fireball chambering; while it lacks the velocity attainable with the vastly more popular .223 Remington, the short .221 Fireball delivers most of the performance with far less noise and flash.

== Factory recall ==
In 1979, XP-100 pistols and Remington Model 600 rifles were recalled because of a safety issue. It was impossible to unload the gun with the safety on because engaging the safety locked the bolt in place. Remington made a free modification available that allowed the bolt to open while the gun was on safe, allowing it to be unloaded without disengaging the safety.

== See also ==
- FN Five-seven
- List of bullpup firearms
- List of pistols
- Savage Striker
- Thompson/Center Contender
