= 6×45mm =

Rimless, bottlenecked cartridge

- Type: Rifle, Handgun
- Place of origin: United States

Production history
- Designed: 1965

Specifications
- Parent case: .223 Remington
- Case type: Rimless, bottleneck
- Bullet diameter: 0.243 (6.2 mm)
- Neck diameter: 0.272 in (6.9 mm)
- Shoulder diameter: 0.354 in (9.0 mm)
- Base diameter: 0.377 in (9.6 mm)
- Rim diameter: 0.378 in (9.6 mm)
- Rim thickness: 0.045 in (1.1 mm)
- Case length: 1.76 in (45 mm)
- Case capacity: 26.9 gr H_{2}O (1.74 cm^{3})
- Primer type: Small rifle

Ballistic performance
Bullet mass/type	Velocity	Energy
70 gr (5 g) SP	3,000 ft/s (910 m/s)	1,400 ft⋅lbf (1,900 J)
80 gr (5 g) SP	2,900 ft/s (880 m/s)	1,495 ft⋅lbf (2,027 J)
90 gr (6 g) SP	2,800 ft/s (850 m/s)	1,565 ft⋅lbf (2,122 J)
100 gr (6 g) SP	2,650 ft/s (810 m/s)	1,560 ft⋅lbf (2,120 J)

The 6×45mm is a rimless, bottlenecked cartridge based on the .223 Remington or 5.56 NATO cartridge necked up to .243 (6mm). The cartridge is also known as the 6mm-223 Remington or 6mm/223.

== History ==
Soon after the release of the .223 Remington as a commercial cartridge, shooters began experimenting with the cartridge in an attempt to improve its performance. Several of these experimenters necked up the .223 Remington to 6mm as the .243 inches (6.17 mm) caliber bullets provided better external ballistic performance over .224 inches (5.69 mm) caliber bullets. While several variations existed between early versions of these cartridges, the 6×45mm as we know it today became the standard version of the cartridge which is simply a necked up version of the .223 Remington without any further modifications or improvements made to it.

== General Information ==
The cartridge's inherent accuracy was a carry over from the .222 Remington which already had a loyal following in benchrest shooting fraternity. Benchrest shooters soon took notice of the cartridge and began building custom rifles chambered for the cartridge. As a testament to the 6×45mm's accuracy, Jim Stekl, who at that time managed Remington's custom shop and developer of the .22 BR cartridge, scored an aggregate record of .3069 inches (7.80 mm) in the 1973 IBS 200 yard Sporter category. However, its use in competitive shooting waned with the arrival of the 6mm BR and 6mm PPC cartridges on the benchrest shooting scene.

The cartridge is efficient with its small powder charge. This translates to prolonged barrel life. The cartridge has very low recoil and muzzle blast which make it a decent cartridge to shoot.

Since the cartridge was never commercially adopted by an ammunition manufacturer, it has remained a wildcat cartridge since its inception. However, making cases from existing .223 Remington brass is as simple as running the case through a 6×45mm die. The availability of .223 cases, the ease of forming, and the light powder charge make for a very affordable shooting cartridge.

== Performance ==
The advantage of the 6×45 mm over the .223 Remington is that it is capable of being loaded with heavier bullets with better ballistic coefficient ratings than its parent cartridge, the .223 Remington. This results in less susceptibility to wind drift and better energy retention characteristics.

Cartridge	Criteria	Muzzle	50 yd (46 m)	100 yd (91 m)	150 yd (140 m)	200 yd (180 m)	300 yd (270 m)
.223 Remington 55 grains (3.6 g) Sierra FMJ-BT	Velocity	3,300 ft/s (1,000 m/s)	3,110 ft/s (950 m/s)	2,929 ft/s (893 m/s)	2,754 ft/s (839 m/s)	2,587 ft/s (789 m/s)	2,269 ft/s (692 m/s)
.223 Remington 55 grains (3.6 g) Sierra FMJ-BT	Energy	1,330 ft⋅lbf (1,800 J)	1,181 ft⋅lbf (1,601 J)	1,047 ft⋅lbf (1,420 J)	926 ft⋅lbf (1,255 J)	817 ft⋅lbf (1,108 J)	629 ft⋅lbf (853 J)
6×45mm 90 grains (5.8 g) Sierra FMJ-BT	Velocity	2,800 ft/s (850 m/s)	2,680 ft/s (820 m/s)	2,562 ft/s (781 m/s)	2,448 ft/s (746 m/s)	2,337 ft/s (712 m/s)	2,123 ft/s (647 m/s)
6×45mm 90 grains (5.8 g) Sierra FMJ-BT	Energy	1,565 ft⋅lbf (2,122 J)	1,430 ft⋅lbf (1,940 J)	1,312 ft⋅lbf (1,779 J)	1,202 ft⋅lbf (1,630 J)	1,100 ft⋅lbf (1,500 J)	918 ft⋅lbf (1,245 J)
Values courtesy of the Hornady Ballistic Calculator

== Cartridge Specifications ==
The 6×45 mm is a wildcat cartridge and has not been standardized by any agency nor has it been offered a proprietary cartridge by any ammunition manufacturer. Some specialty rifle makers such as those that sell varmint rifles offer rifles chambered in this cartridge. Specifications for the cartridge are derived from the necked up parent cartridge without further improvement.

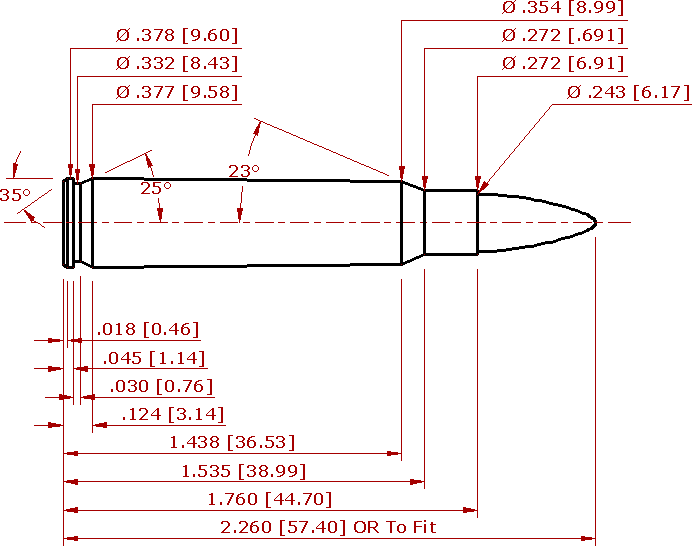

The cartridge maximum overall length is nominally given as 2.260-inch (57.4 mm), however, as the cartridge is a wildcat cartridge chamber dimensions may vary from manufacturer to manufacturer. For this reason overall length of the cartridge may vary.

== Hunting Applications ==
Many countries and many U.S. states require a minimum of .24 caliber (6.1 mm) for hunting certain game species, such as deer. In such countries and states the 6×45mm would be legal for hunting as long as no further requirement regarding power, energy, or case length is stipulated. However, it should be considered a marginal cartridge for these game species at best.

The cartridge gained a following in South Africa where it was used to hunt small antelope and gazelle species such as duiker, impala, klipspringer, springbok and the Thompson's gazelles. In North America it is capable of taking small predator species such as bobcats, coyotes and foxes. In many European countries, it can be used for small goat and deer species such as the roe deer and chamois where legally permitted. For example, in the Netherlands, rifle calibers in 6mm are allowed for roe deer if they retain a kinetic energy of at least 980 Joule at 100 meters.(Dutch)

An improved version of the cartridge called the 6 mm TCU was developed for metallic silhouette shooting. While the cartridges are quite similar they are not interchangeable.

== Firearms ==
The AR-15/M16 can easily be converted to the 6×45mm with a simple barrel swap with few or no further modifications to the rifle. This is also true for rifles such as Ruger's Mini-14 and most bolt-action rifles chambered for the .223 Remington cartridge. The 6×45mm cartridge provides better down range performance than the .223 Remington or the 5.56 NATO cartridges. The cartridge is currently offered by Les Baer in an AR rifle. The cartridge had been offered by Cooper Arms, Kimber and a few other rifle manufacturers in their rifles as a regular factory chambering for a period of time.

However, the cartridge's breakthrough was in the area of handgun hunting where it became very popular. The bolt-action Remington XP-100 pistol and the break-action Thompson/Center Contender handgun were chambered for the cartridge. It provided a flat-shooting cartridge capable of taking small deer and small game species.

In February 2010, Black Hills Ammunition began selling 6×45mm ammunition. They use standard .243 bullets weighing 85 and 100 gr. Sporting Products LLC also began to distribute AR-15 uppers and complete rifles chambered for the 6×45mm.

Shultz & Larsen of Denmark offer the "Legacy" model. A lightweight (2,65 kg / 5 lbs 13,5oz), miniature-action, barrel-swap rifle system. Calibers offered are .222 Rem (1/10" twist), .223 Rem (1/8" and 1/10" twist), 6×45 (1/8" twist) and .300 Whisper (1/7,5" twist). Standard barrels are 510 mm / 20" long.

== See also ==
- 6 mm caliber
- 6×45mm SAW
- List of rifle cartridges
- Wildcat cartridge
