= Remington Model 660 =

- Type: Bolt-action rifle
- Place of origin: United States

Production history
- Designer: Remington R&D
- Manufacturer: Remington Arms
- Produced: 1968–1971
- No. built: 45,332 (660); 5,204 (660 Magnum)
- Variants: Model 660 Magnum

Specifications
- Mass: 6.5 lb (2.9 kg)
- Length: 38.75 in (98.4 cm)
- Barrel length: 20 in (51 cm)
- Cartridge: .222 Remington.223 Remington.243 Winchester; 6mm Remington; 6.5mm Rem Mag.308 Winchester.350 Rem Mag
- Action: Bolt action
- Feed system: 4-shot magazine

The Remington Model 660 is a bolt-action rifle manufactured by Remington Arms from 1968 to 1971. The rifle was intended as a replacement for the Model 600.

== History ==
The Model 660 emerged from the success of the Model 600, which was originally produced from 1964 to 1967. The Model 660 was released in 1968; it had a 1.5in longer barrel and no ventilated rib.. After 3 years, the M660 was discontinued and the Model 600 Mohawk was introduced.

== Variants ==
Model 660 Magnum
The Model 660 Magnum had a laminated walnut stock, a recoil pad, and detachable sling swivels.

== Recall ==
The Model 660, along with many Model 600s was affected by a recall in 1979 to remedy a problem with the bolt lock safety that could "under certain circumstances, [...] result in an accidental discharge".
