= M249 Squad Automatic Weapon =

Light Machine Gun, 5.56 mm, M249 SAW
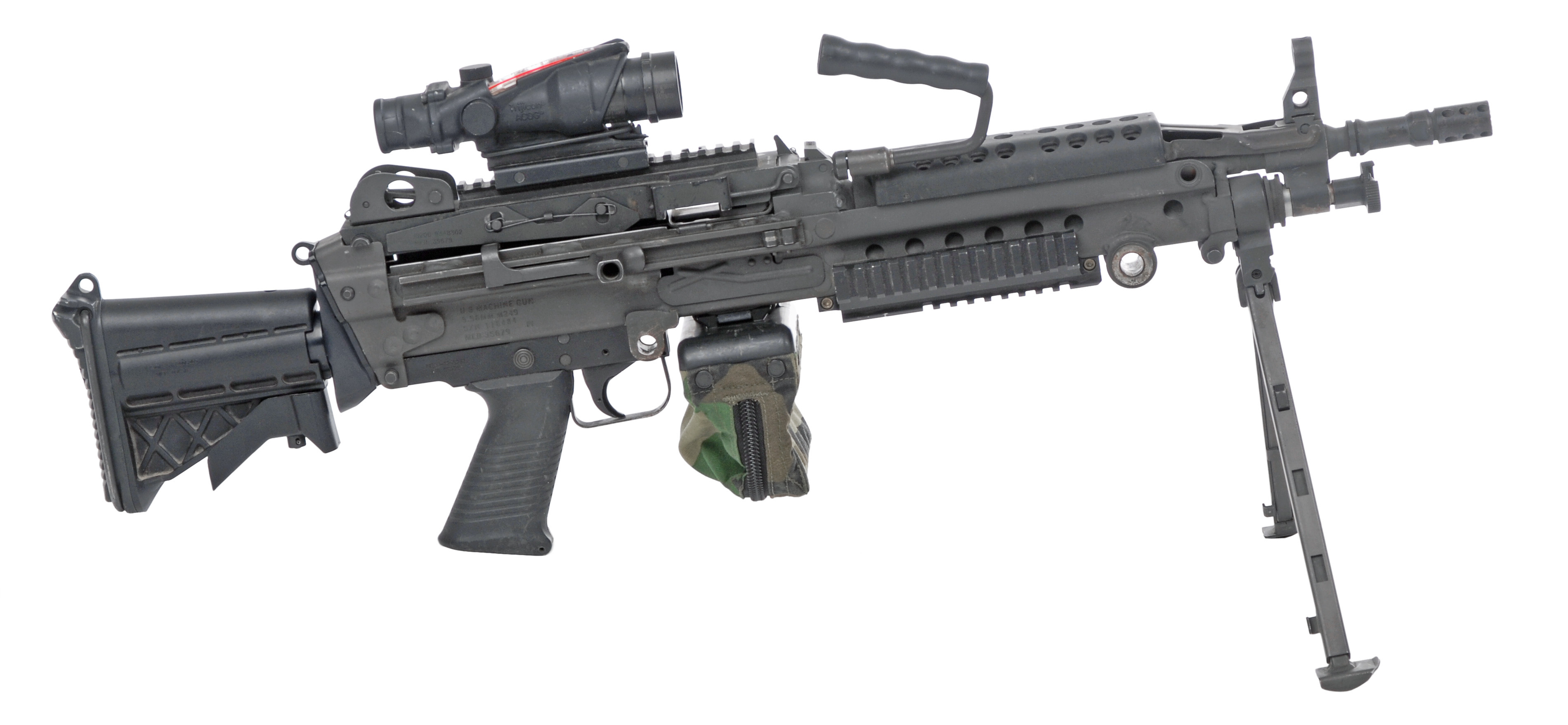
- M249 Para with an ACOG optical sight
- Type: Light machine gun Squad automatic weapon
- Place of origin: Belgium / United States

Service history
- In service: 1984–present
- Used by: See Users
- Wars: United States invasion of Panama; Gulf War; Somali Civil War; Bosnian War; Kosovo War; War in Afghanistan (2001–2021); Iraq War; Syrian Civil War; Russo-Ukrainian War (2014–present); Yemeni Civil War (2014–present); Saudi-led intervention in Yemen; Haitian gang war

Production history
- Designed: 1976
- Manufacturer: FN America
- Unit cost: US$4,087
- Produced: Late 1970s–present
- Variants: See Variants

Specifications
- Mass: 7.5 kg (17 lb) empty; 10 kg (22 lb) with 200-round soft pouch
- Length: 40.75 in (1,035 mm)
- Barrel length: 465 mm (18.3 in); 521 mm (20.5 in)
- Cartridge: 5.56×45mm NATO
- Action: Gas-operated long-stroke piston system, open bolt, rotating bolt
- Rate of fire: 850 rounds/min
- Muzzle velocity: 915 m/s (3,000 ft/s)
- Effective firing range: 700 m (2,300 ft) (point target, 465 mm barrel); 800 m (2,600 ft) (point target, 521 mm barrel); 3,600 m (11,800 ft) (maximum range)
- Feed system: M27 linked disintegrating belt in a 100- or 200-round soft pouch STANAG magazine
- Sights: Iron sights or Picatinny rail for various optical sights

The M249 SAW, formally as the Light Machine Gun, 5.56 mm, M249 Squad Automatic Weapon, is the United States Armed Forces adaptation of the Belgian FN Minimi, a light machine gun designed and manufactured by FN Herstal.

The M249 SAW is manufactured in the United States by the subsidiary FN Manufacturing, LLC (FN America), a company in Columbia, South Carolina. It was adopted in 1982 by the U.S. Armed Forces to address the lack of sustained automatic fire capability at the squad level and has been widely used since. The M249 SAW combines the rate of fire of a machine gun with the accuracy and portability of an assault rifle.

The M249 SAW is a gas operated and air-cooled light machine gun. It features a quick-change barrel, enabling the operator to rapidly replace an overheated or obstructed barrel. It can be paired with a folding bipod attached to the front of the gas block, or attached to an M192 lightweight ground mount tripod. The M249 SAW features a dual-feeding mechanism, configured primarily as a belt-fed machine gun while also being compatible with STANAG magazines used in the M16 rifle and M4 carbine.

The M249 SAW has been fielded in major conflicts involving the United States military since the United States invasion of Panama in 1989.

In 2009, the United States Marine Corps selected the M27 Infantry Automatic Rifle to partially replace the M249 in USMC service.

In 2022, the U.S. Army selected the M250 light machine gun from SIG Sauer to replace the M249 SAW.

== Developmental history ==
In 1965, the M2 Browning and M60 were the primary machine guns of the U.S. Army and U.S. Marine Corps. The M2 was a large-caliber heavy machine gun, usually mounted on vehicles or in fixed emplacements. The M60 was a more mobile general-purpose machine gun intended to be carried by troops to provide heavy automatic fire.

Both firearms were very heavy and usually required a crew of at least two to operate efficiently. The Browning automatic rifle (BAR), the army's main individual machine gun since its introduction in World War I, was phased out in 1957 with the introduction of the M14 rifle (which had a fully automatic mode). "Designated riflemen" in every squad were ordered to use their rifles on the fully automatic setting, while other troops were required to use their rifle's semi-automatic mode on most occasions to increase accuracy and conserve ammunition. Because the M14 and M16 were not designed with sustained automatic fire in mind, they often overheated or jammed. The 20-round and 30-round magazines of these rifles limited their sustained automatic effectiveness when compared to belt-fed machine guns.

The Army decided that an individual machine gun, lighter than the M60, but with more firepower than the M16, would be advantageous; troops would no longer have to rely on rifles for automatic fire. Through the 1960s, the introduction of a machine gun into the infantry squad was examined in various studies. Most light machine gun experiments concentrated on the Stoner 63 modular weapon system, which could be easily modified for different purposes. The Stoner 63 LMG saw combat for a brief period in Vietnam with the Marine Corps, and later on a wider scale with the U.S. Navy SEALs.

In 1968, the Army Small Arms Program developed plans for a new 5.56 mm caliber LMG, though no funds were allocated (5.56 mm ammunition was viewed as underpowered by many in the armed forces). Studies of improved 5.56 mm ammunition with better performance characteristics began. The earliest reference to studies of other LMG calibers did not appear until 1969. In July 1970, the U.S. Army finally approved development of an LMG, but did not specify a caliber. At this time, the "Squad Automatic Weapon" (SAW) nomenclature was introduced.

Actual design for alternative LMG cartridges did not begin until July 1971. A month later, Frankford Arsenal decided on two cartridge designs for the new LMG: a 6 mm cartridge and a new 5.56 mm cartridge with a much larger case. Neither design was finalized by March 1972, when the Army published the specifications document for the planned SAW. The 6 mm cartridge design was eventually approved in May of that year.

Prior to July 1972, SAW development contracts were awarded to Maremont, Philco Ford, and the Rodman Laboratory at Rock Island Arsenal, which produced the XM233, XM234, and XM235, respectively. Designs were required to weigh less than 20 lb (9.1 kg) including 200 rounds of ammunition, and have a range of at least 800 m (870 yd).

=== Trials ===
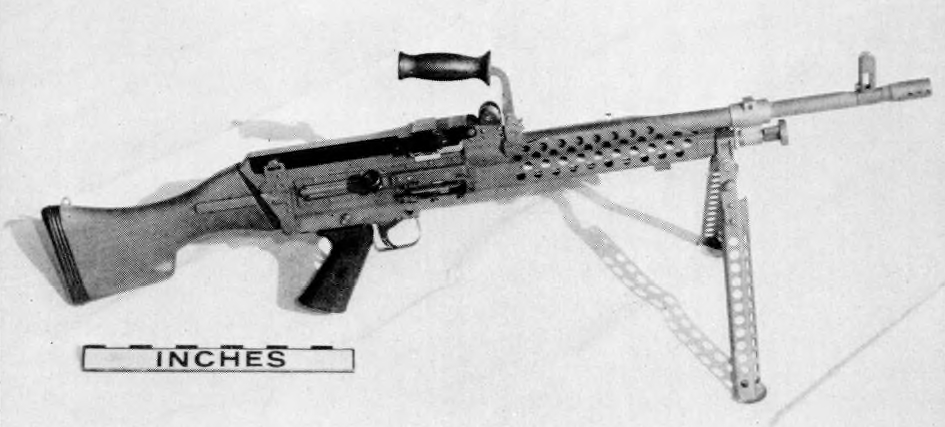
Initial Belgian-designed Minimi prototype delivered to the U.S. Infantry Board for evaluation, before it received its XM249 designation (note the difference)

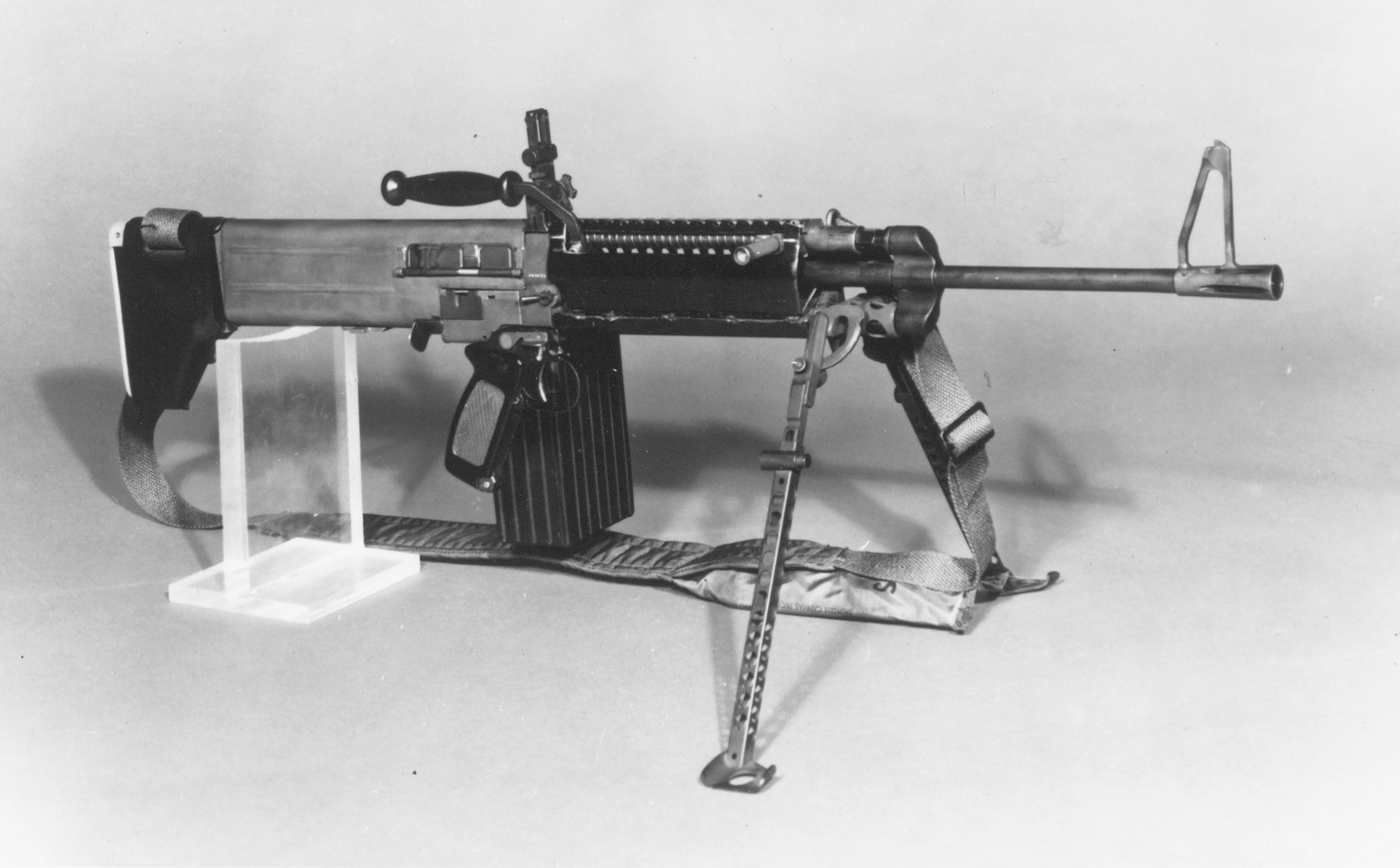
A prototype of the XM235

Three 5.56 mm candidate light machine guns were included with the 6 mm candidates in initial trials: the Colt M16 HBAR; the FN Minimi; and the HK23A1. Initial trials ended in December 1974. In February 1976, the Minimi and XM235 were selected for further development, and other designs were eliminated. Opinions on the 6 mm cartridge were mixed due to the logistical implications of having multiple calibers in infantry service.

In June, it was requested that the SAW specifications document be revised to emphasize standard 5.56 mm ammunition. In October, the requested revisions were approved, and bids were solicited for the conversion of the Rodman XM235 to 5.56 mm. Production of the converted XM235 was awarded to Ford Aerospace, and its designation was changed to XM248. A new M16 HBAR variant, the XM106, was developed in 1978, and soon after, Heckler & Koch lobbied to include a 5.56 mm conversion of its HK21A1, instead of the standard 7.62 mm NATO ammunition it was built for, in future SAW testing. The latter model was designated the XM262. At this time, the FN Minimi received the designation XM249. Testing of the four candidates resumed in April 1979.

In May 1980, the FN XM249 was selected as the best choice for future development on the grounds of performance and cost, while the HK XM262 reportedly came a close second. In September, FN was awarded a "maturity phase" contract for further development of the XM249, and testing of the new light machine gun began in June 1981. The official adoption took place in February 1982.

== Operational history ==
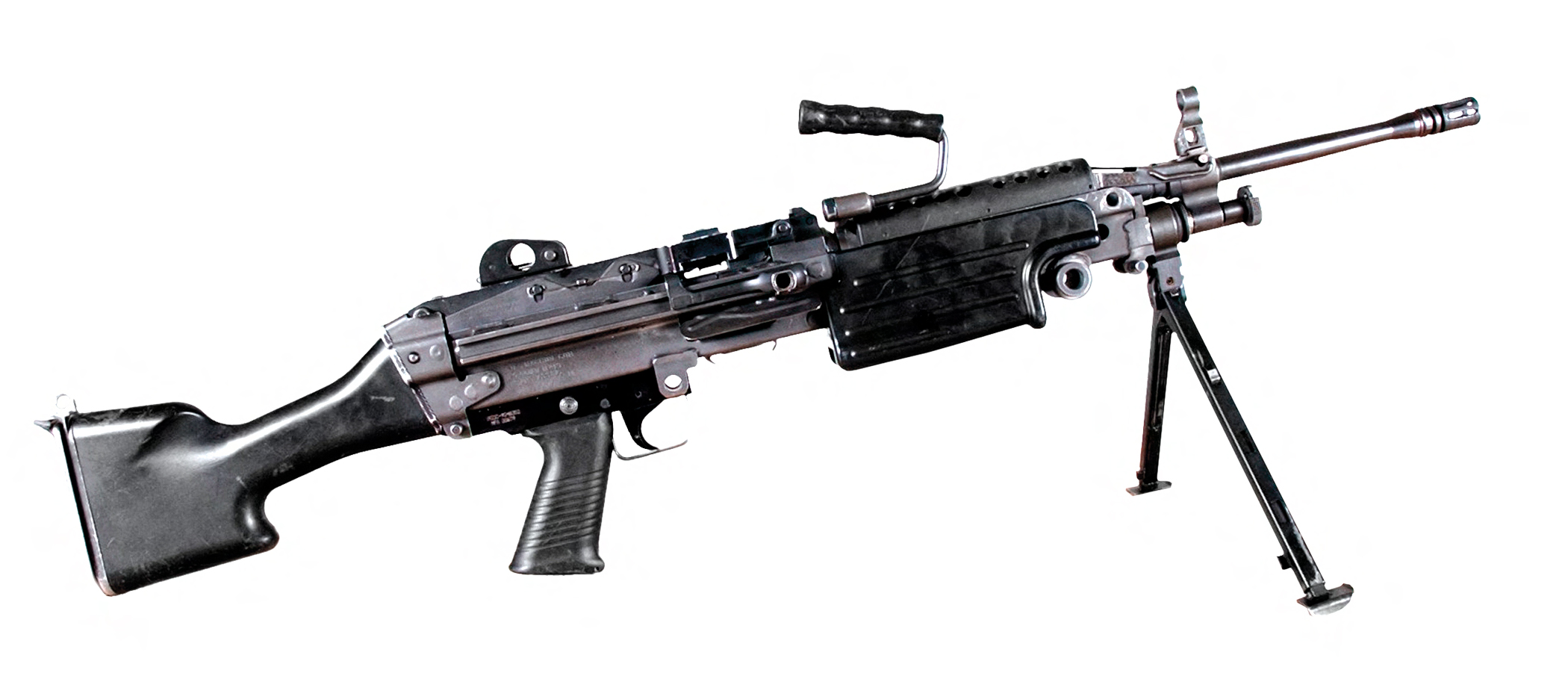
An early model of the M249 SAW, with the stock and handguard of 'Product Improvement Program'

The FN Minimi entered U.S. Army service as the M249 SAW in 1984, and was later adopted by the U.S. Marine Corps in 1985. The U.S. production model has a different buttstock compared the original FN Minimi. It is manufactured in the FN factory in Columbia, South Carolina.

Although found to be reliable and accurate, multiple safety hazards were identified in the design, including sharp edges and an exposed hot barrel. Soldiers complained that the front sight required special tools to be adjusted. On August 23, 1985, then-U.S. Under Secretary of the Army James R. Ambrose suspended M249 production pending the development of a product improvement program (PIP). Congress removed funds for the M249 from the Fiscal Year 1986 defense budget, then retroactively set aside the program's funding for other purposes. Over 1,100 M249s already issued were to remain in use, but be retrofitted with the PIP kit when it became available. Over 7,000 M249s were to stay in storage at depots until corrective changes could be made. The PIP kit was eventually developed and implemented, and production of the M249 resumed.

Initial reactions to the M249 SAW were mixed: it fulfilled the light machine gun role well when fired from a prone position, but was not as effective when fired from the shoulder or hip. It was praised for its extreme durability and massive firepower, but was criticized for a number of issues: the blank firing adapter fitted poorly, the bipod was fragile, the sling attachment was awkward, and there were many slots and gaps that accumulated dirt. Some claimed that the heavy-barrelled version of the M16 rifle was a more effective light machine gun.

The M249 SAW was not used consistently before the 1991 Gulf War, though it has been used in every major U.S. conflict since. American personnel in Somalia in 1993, Bosnia in 1994, Kosovo in 1999, Afghanistan in 2001 and Iraq since 2003 have been issued M249s. Surplus M249s were donated to Bolivia, Colombia and Tunisia.

Tactically, M249 SAWs are either carried with a maneuvering unit and fired while handheld, or positioned to remain stationary and provide covering fire for other units. The base load of ammunition was originally 600 rounds, carried in three 200-round boxes. These boxes were carried in soft pouches labeled Case, Small Arms, Ammunition, 200-Round Magazine. The modern load of ammunition carried for the M249 is 1,000 rounds in five 200-round belts, although up to 500 extra rounds may be loaded into 100-round soft pouches.

=== Persian Gulf War ===
A supply of 929 M249 SAWs was issued to personnel from the U.S. Army and Marine Corps during the Persian Gulf War. Although exposure to combat was scarce, M249 gunners who were involved in fighting mainly used their machine guns to provide cover fire for friendly maneuvering troops from fixed positions, rather than maneuvering with them. There were many complaints about the M249 clogging up with sand after prolonged use in the desert environment.

=== War in Afghanistan ===
The standard squad automatic weapon in Afghanistan was the M249 SAW with the PIP kit, which served alongside its heavier counterpart, the M240 machine gun. Most M249s were given a collapsible buttstock immediately prior to the invasion to reduce its length and make the M249 more practical for parachuting and close-quarters combat. Special Operations troops typically favored the shorter Para variant of the M249, which weighs much less.

A report entitled Lessons Learned in Afghanistan was released by Lieutenant Colonel Charlie Dean and SFC Sam Newland of the U.S. Army Natick Soldier Center in 2002. They found that 54% of SAW gunners had problems maintaining their M249s, and 30% reported that the gun rusted easily. Soldiers reported ammunition boxes rattling and falling off. 80% percent of soldiers surveyed were pleased with the light machine gun's accuracy and lethality, yet only 64% claimed they were "confident in their weapon". M249s clogging up with sand in the desert seems to be the main complaint.

=== Iraq War ===
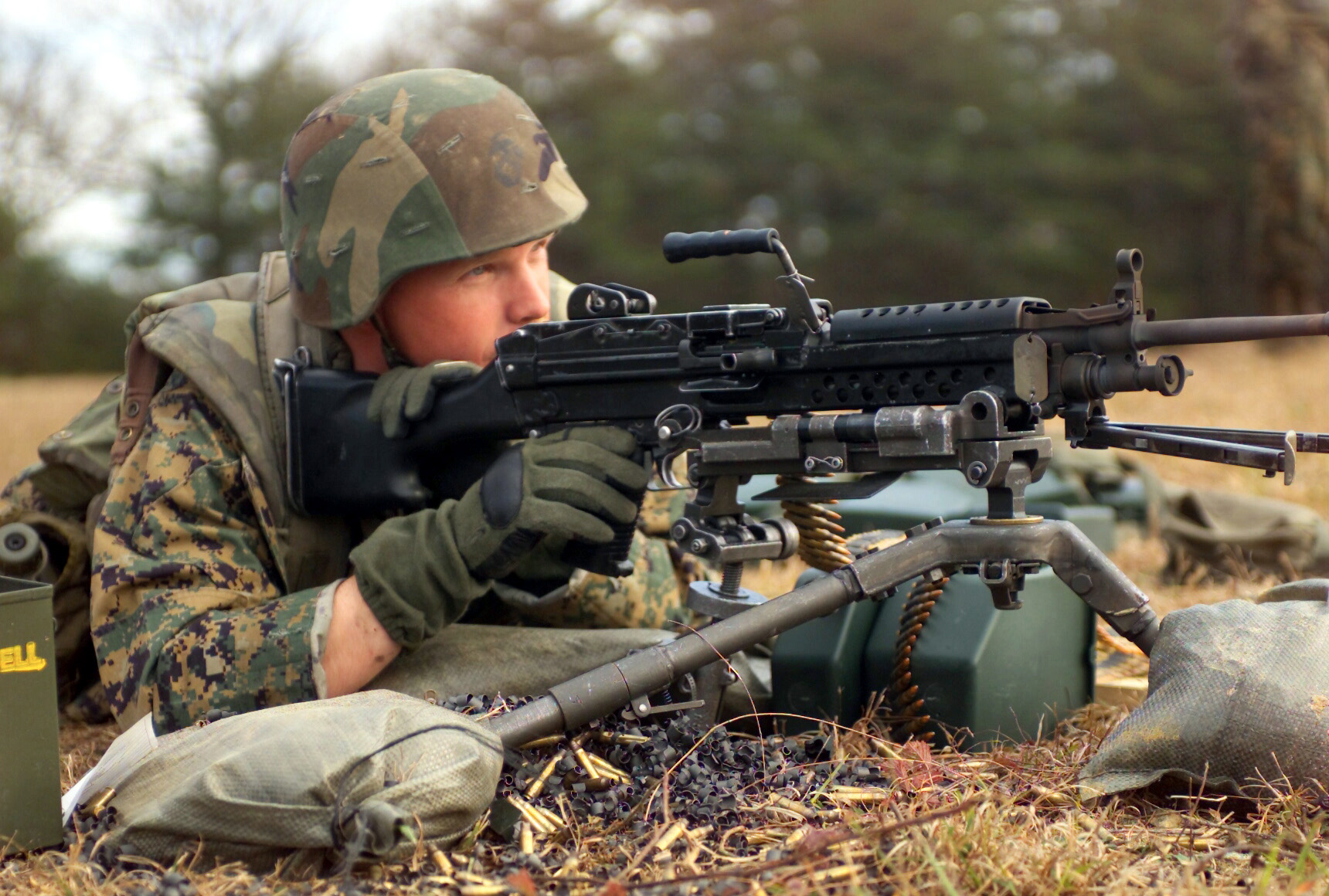
A U.S. Marine firing an M249 from an M122A1 tripod at a training range, November 2003

The PIP and Para variants of the M249 SAW were used in the Iraq war since the invasion. By 2004, many M249s had been in service for almost 20 years and were becoming increasingly unreliable. Soldiers were requesting replacements and new features, and there are reports of soldiers holding their M249s together with duct tape. The lethality of the 5.56 mm ammunition has been called into question by reports of enemy soldiers still firing after being hit multiple times. As in previous conflicts, the sandy environment causes the M249s and other weapons to clog up and jam if they are not cleaned frequently.

The report Operation Iraqi Freedom – PEO Soldier Lessons Learned evaluates the performance of weapons in the Iraq War and was published by Lieutenant Colonel Jim Smith of the U.S. Army in May 2003. Smith spoke positively of the M249 SAW, claiming that it "provided the requisite firepower at the squad level as intended". He praised the SPW variant, noting that its "short barrel and forward pistol grip allowed for very effective use of the SAW in urban terrain". At the National Defense Industrial Association in 2007, Lieutenant Colonel Al Kelly of the 1st Battalion, 17th Infantry gave a presentation describing the M249 as having "good range, excellent reliability" and an "excellent tracer". He said that a cloth pouch was preferred over the plastic box for holding linked ammunition, and that "knock-down power is poor, but is compensated by rate of fire".

=== Evaluation ===
In December 2006, the Center for Naval Analyses (CNA) released a report on U.S. small arms in combat. The CNA conducted surveys on 2,608 troops returning from combat in Iraq and Afghanistan over the past 12 months. Only troops who fired their weapons at enemy targets were allowed to participate. Three hundred forty-one troops were armed with M249 SAWs, making up 13 percent of the survey. 71 percent of M249 users (242 troops) reported that they were satisfied with the light machine gun. 40 percent of users preferred feeding the SAW with the soft 100-round pouch, while 21 percent chose the soft and hard 200-round pouches each. 60 percent (205 troops) were satisfied with handling qualities, such as handguards, size, and weight. Of those dissatisfied, just under half thought that it was too heavy. M249 users had the lowest levels of satisfaction with weapon maintainability at 70 percent (239 troops), most due to the difficulty in removing and receiving small components and poor corrosion resistance. The SAW had the highest levels of stoppages at 30 percent (102 troops), and 41 percent of those that experienced a stoppage said it had a large impact on their ability to clear the stoppage and re-engage their target. Sixty-five percent (222 troops) did not need their machine guns repaired while in theater. Sixty-five percent (222 troops) were confident in the M249's reliability, defined as level of soldier confidence their weapon will fire without malfunction, and 64 percent (218 troops) were confident in its durability, defined as level of soldier confidence their weapon will not break or need repair. Both factors were attributed to high levels of soldiers performing their own maintenance. 60 percent of M249 users offered recommendations for improvements. Seventeen percent of requests were for making the M249 SAW lighter, and another 17 percent were for more durable belt links and drums, as well as other modifications, such as a collapsible stock.

=== Replacement ===
In 2009, the U.S. Marine Corps selected the M27 Infantry Automatic Rifle, a lighter, magazine-fed rifle to supplement and partially replace the M249. With plans to buy up to 4,100 IARs to complement and partially replace its 10,000 M249s, of which 8,000 will remain in service, held at platoon level, it acquired 450 of the Heckler & Koch HK416 (M27 IAR variant) for testing. The Marines started fielding the M27 in 2010, but kept both weapons in the inventory due to the M249's greater ammunition capacity and higher sustained fire rate. Rifle companies are typically issued 27 IARs and six SAWs. The Army passed on the concept of the IAR, believing automatic rifle with a magazine would lower the effectiveness and firepower of a squad. While the Marine Corps has 13-man squads, the Army organizes its soldiers into squads of nine and needs considerably more firepower from the squad machine gunners to make up the difference.

In early 2017, the Army began soliciting bids for the Next Generation Squad Weapon-Automatic Rifle (NGSW-AR or NGSAR) to replace the M249. In July 2018, the Army awarded contracts to six companies including Textron, head of the preceding LSAT program where they made development leaps with cased telescoped (CT) ammunition, for NGSW-AR and ammunition prototypes. The stated requirements included:

- Maximum weight of 5.4 kg (12 lb), including sling, bipod, and sound suppressor
- Maximum total length of 89 cm (35 in)
- Engage pinpoint targets up to 600 m (2,000 ft), and suppress (area fire targets) to a range of 1,200 m (3,900 ft)
- Compatible with next-generation Small Arms Fire Control systems

In April 2022, the U.S. Army selected SIG Sauer as the winner of the competition. Their automatic rifle is designated the M250 light machine gun.

== Design details ==
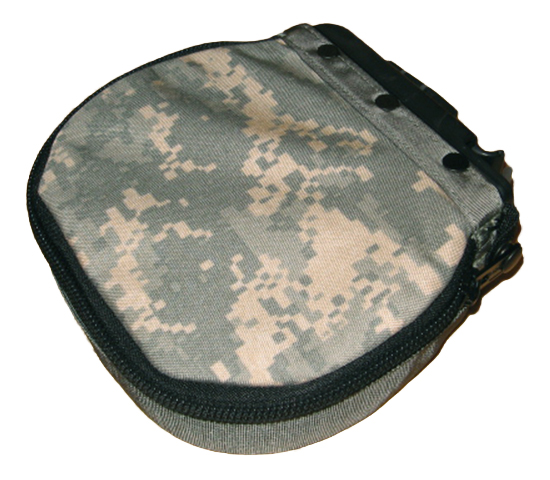
A 200-round cloth pouch in Universal Camouflage Pattern with a zipper and metal clip for mounting to an M249 SAW used for holding belts of linked ammunition

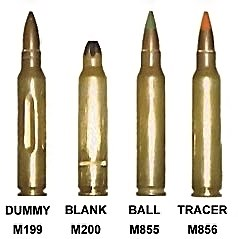
The different rounds that can be successfully loaded into the M249 SAW

The M249 SAW is a belt-fed light machine gun chambered in 5.56×45mm NATO cartridge, usually a combination of one M856 tracer and four M855 ball cartridges fed from M27 linked belts. Belts are typically held in a hard plastic or soft canvas box attached to the underside of the feedbox retainer. The M249 can also fire rifle grenades.

The M249 fires from an open bolt and is gas operated. When the trigger is pulled, the bolt and bolt carrier move forward under the power of the recoil spring. A cartridge is stripped from the belt, chambered, and discharged, sending a bullet down the bore. Expanding propellant gases are diverted through a hole in the barrel into a chamber. This pressure moves a piston providing the energy to extract and eject the spent casing as well as advance the belt and compress the recoil spring, thus preparing for subsequent shots. It has an overall length of 41 in (1,041 mm). It weighs 17 lb (8 kg) empty and 22 lb (10 kg) including a 200-round belt and plastic ammo box.

The M249 SAW's air-cooled barrel is equipped with a mechanism to remove and replace the barrel assembly with a spare, this makes it easy for the operator to easily change the barrel on the field when it gets too hot during extensive amounts of fire. The barrel has a rifling twist rate of one turn in 180 mm (7 in). A folding bipod with adjustable legs is attached near the front of the M249, though there are provisions for hard-mounting to a M192 lightweight ground mount tripod or vehicle mount.

=== Gas regulator ===
The M249's original gas regulator featured two different gas port sizes; normal and adverse. The normal gas setting has a cyclic rate of fire of around 750–850 rounds per minute, while the adverse gas setting increases the cyclic rate of fire to around 950–1,150 rounds per minute and is only used in extreme environmental conditions or when heavy fouling is present in the gas tube. The two-position gas regulator was discarded as part of a product improvement program, which made the M249s that received the product improvement kit no longer able to fire at the higher cyclic rate. The rapid rate of fire is around 100 rounds per minute. The sustained rate of fire, the rate at which the gunner can fire continuously without overheating, is around 50 rounds per minute.

=== Product Improvement Program ===
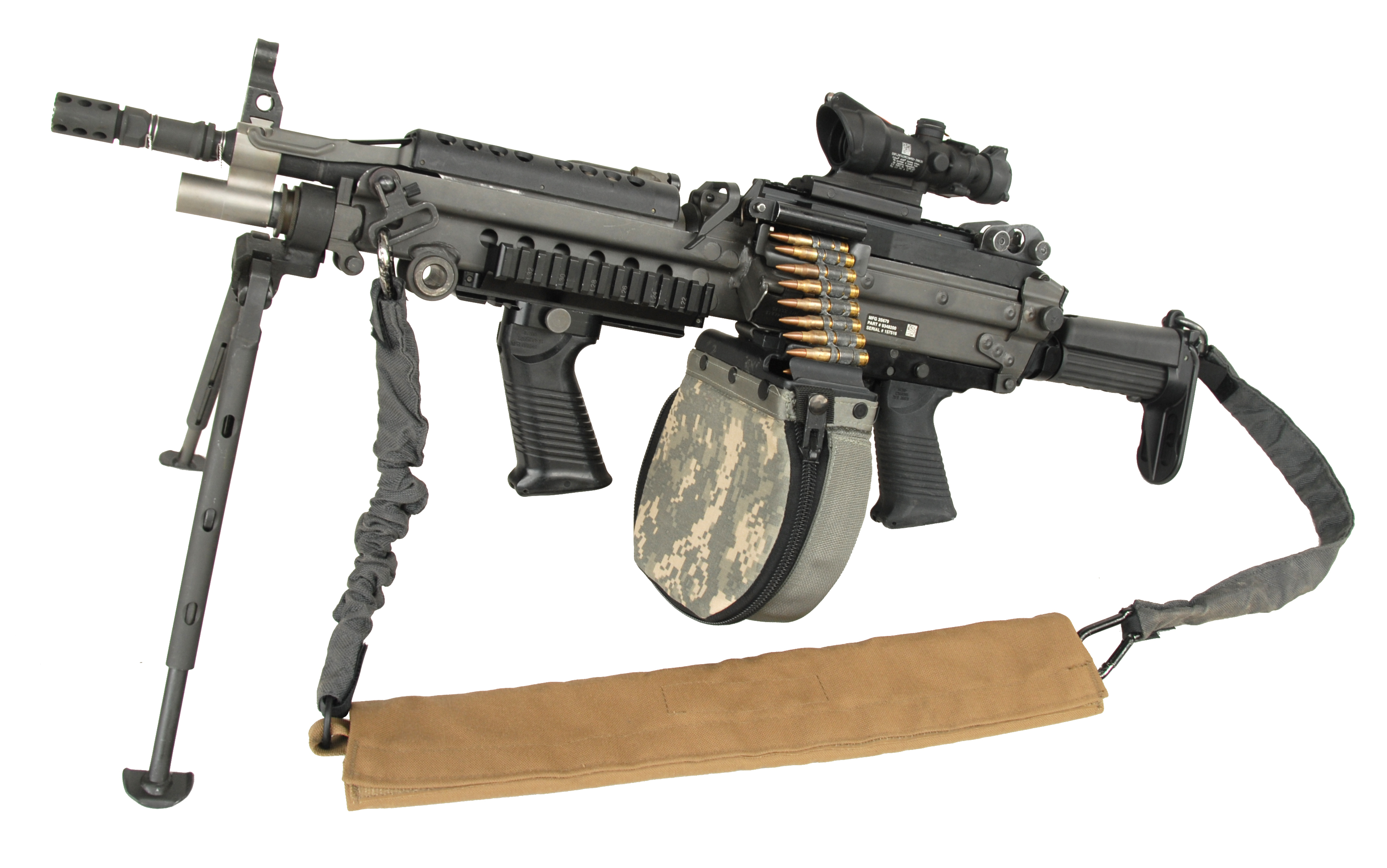
A "fully improved" U.S. Army-issue M249, circa July 2010

The product improvement program (PIP) kit replaced the original steel tubular stock with a plastic stock based upon the shape of the heavier M240 machine gun. The change in stocks allowed for the addition of a hydraulic buffer system to reduce recoil. In addition, the dual gas port settings were reduced to only one; M249s with the product improvement kit can no longer fire at a higher cyclic speed. A handguard was added above the barrel to prevent burns, and the formerly fixed barrel changing handle was swapped for a folding unit. Certain parts were bevelled or chamfered to prevent cutting soldiers' hands and arms. Other changes involved the bipod, pistol grip, flash suppressor, and sights. Over the years, additional modifications have been introduced as part of the Soldier Enhancement Program and Rapid Fielding Initiative. These include an improved bipod, 100– and 200–round fabric "soft pouches" (to replace the original plastic ammunition boxes), and Picatinny rails for the feed tray cover and forearm so that optics and other accessories may be added.

An extensive maintenance program intended to extend the service life of M249 SAWs has been carried out, especially units that suffered from wear due to heavy use. In particular the warping of the receiver rails on the early models was a defect that occurred in heavily used first-generation M249s. This defect however has been eliminated on later models and is no longer present on the current-issue M249, which has reinforced rails and full-length welding rather than spot welding. A replacement of the M249's buttstock that is redesigned to be adjustable in length is also available.

== Variants ==
=== M249 Para ===
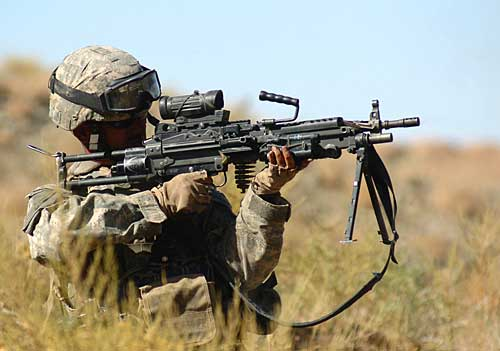
Early model of the M249 Para equipped with a M145 Machine Gun Optic, October 2005, Koshk Kowl, Afghanistan

The M249 Para (Paratrooper) is a compact variant of the M249 SAW intended for use in airborne infantry units. It features a sliding aluminum buttstock, a shorter 13.7 in (348 mm) barrel, a length of 893 mm (35 in) and a weight of 7.1 kg (16 lb).

=== M249 SPW ===
The M249 SPW (Special Purpose Weapon) is a modified version of the M249 SAW designed to meet United States Special Operations Command requirements. The barrel carrying handle, magazine well, and mounting lug were removed to reduce weight. As a result, the SPW cannot be mounted in vehicles or use STANAG magazines. It features a detachable bipod and Picatinny rails were added to the feed cover and forearm to accommodate SOPMOD accessories. The SPW's lightweight barrel is longer than that of the Para variant, giving it a total length of 908 mm (36 in) and a weight of 5.7 kg (13 lb).

=== Mk 46 Mod 0 ===
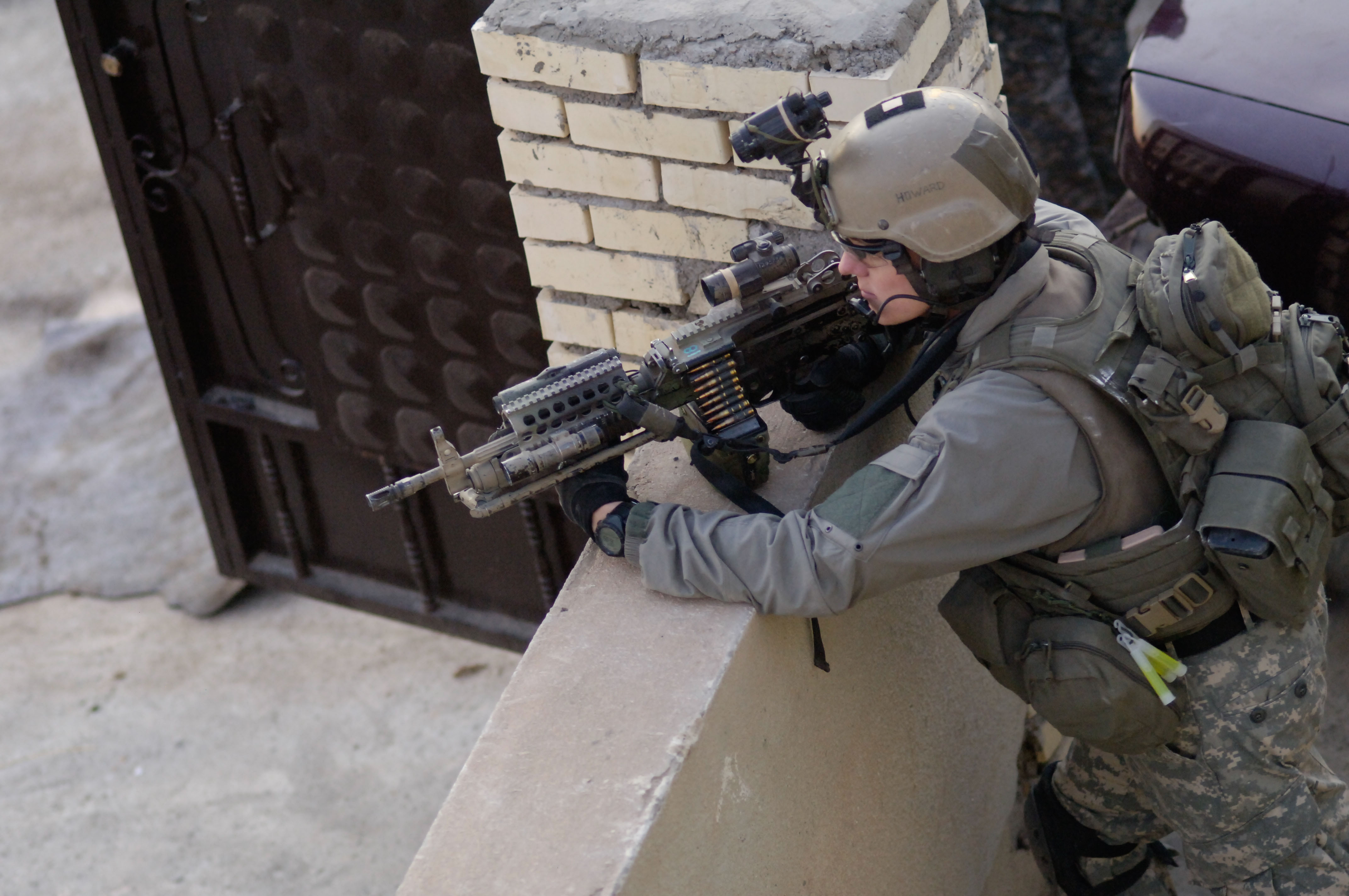
A Ranger with 2nd Battalion, 75th Ranger Regiment armed with a Mk 46 Mod 0 provides overwatch security on an objective during a mission in Iraq, November 2006

The Mk 46 Mod 0 is a further development of the M249 SPW. It was developed in conjunction with the U.S. Special Operations Command (USSOCOM), specifically the U.S. Naval Special Warfare Command (NAVSPECWARCOM). The program led to both the Mk 46 and Mk 48. Like the M249 SPW, the barrel carrying handle, magazine insertion well, and vehicle mounting lugs have been removed to save weight. However, the Mk 46 Mod 0 retains the standard M249 plastic buttstock instead of the collapsible buttstock used on the SPW. The Picatinny rail forearm differs slightly from the SPW. The Mk 46 Mod 0 has the option of using the lighter M249 SPW barrel or a thicker, fluted barrel of the same length.

==== Mk 46 Mod 1 ====
U.S. Army infantryman with 2-12 IN, aims a Mk 46 Mod 1 in Kunar Province, Afghanistan, May 6, 2010

The Mk 46 Mod 1 features an improved bipod assembly, and brings back the M249 SPW's handguard design and the barrel carrying handle.

==== Mk 46 Mod 2 ====
The Mk 46 Mod 2 features improved receiver pins, feed cover retaining latch, ergonomic cocking handle, enhanced trigger guard, a 5-position adjustable telescopic buttstock with a 4-position adjustable cheek rest, and a reinforced bipod that can be folded even when a foregrip is attached. The handguard has been redesigned to combine the side and lower Picatinny rails with the heat vents. The heat shield has also been improved.

=== Mk 48 Mod 0 ===
The Mk 48 Mod 0 is a variant of the Mk 46 Mod 0 chambered in 7.62×51mm NATO, officially classified as an LWMG (Light Weight Machine Gun). It was developed as a replacement for the Mk 43 Mod 0/1, a variant of the M60 machine gun. Reliability issues with the M60 and its design variants led the U.S. Army to replace it with the M240B in the mid-1990s. The M240B, however, weighs in at a considerable 27.5 lb (12.5 kg) and is about 49 in (120 cm) long with the standard barrel. NAVSPECWAR was reluctant to give up the increased portability of the M60 (which weighed 22.5 lb (10.2 kg) with an overall length of 37.7 in (96 cm) in its shortest configuration) in spite of the M240B's increased reliability. A request was put in for a new machine gun in 2001, and FN responded with a scaled-up version of the M249 SAW weighing in at 18.5 lb (8.4 kg) with an overall length of 39.5 in (100 cm). The new design achieved improved reliability compared to M60 variants with a decrease in weight. USSOCOM was expected to receive deliveries of the new variant in August 2003.

The Mk 48 Mod 0 is a gas-operated, air-cooled, fully automatic belt-fed machine gun. The design is based on an early 7.62×51mm NATO prototype of the FN Minimi, modified to be a scaled-up version of the 5.56 mm Mk 46 Mod 0. The Mk 48 Mod 0 is currently in service with certain USSOCOM units, such as the U.S. Navy SEALs and Army's 75th Ranger Regiment.

==== Mk 48 Mod 0 ====
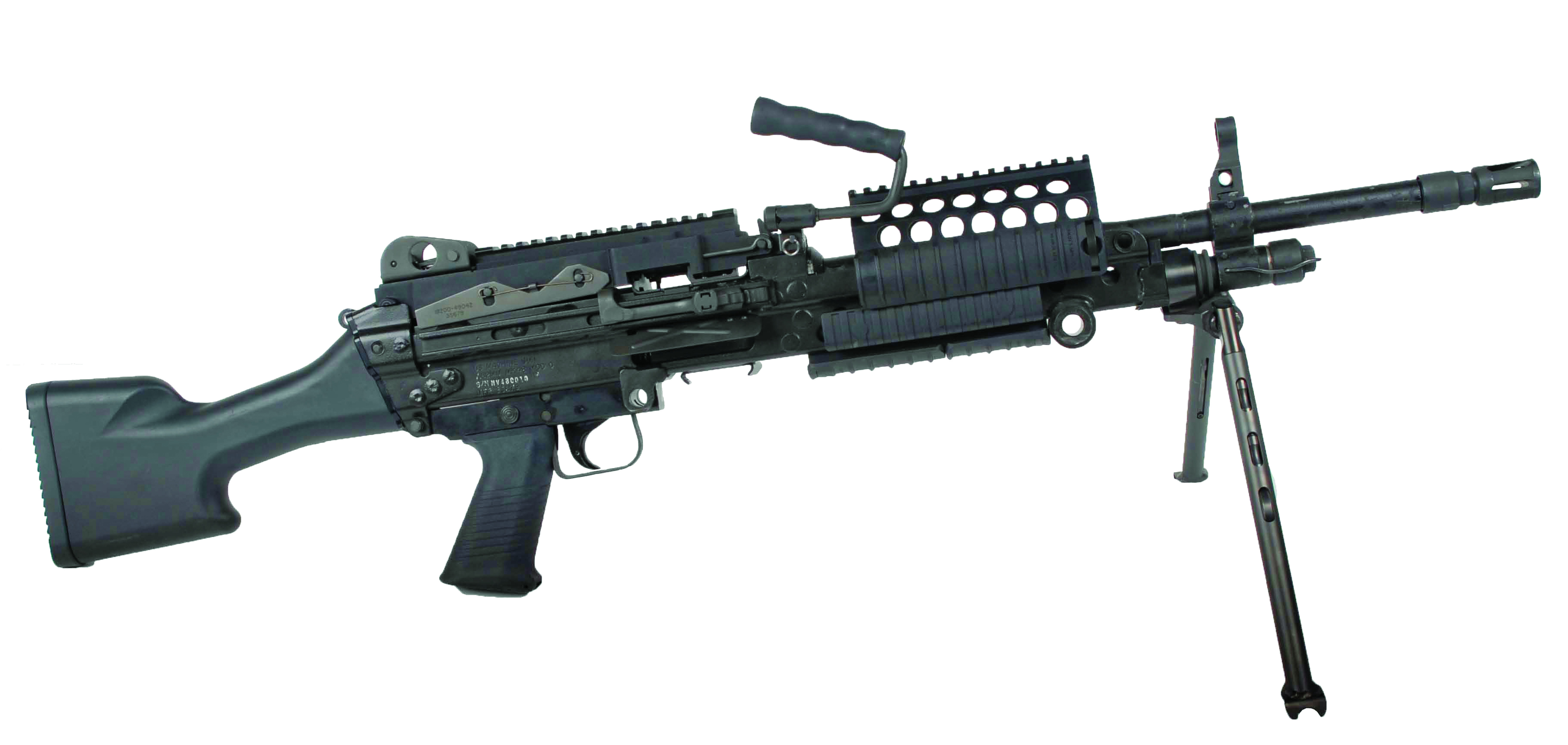
Mk 48 Mod 0

This is a 7.62×51mm NATO version of the Mk 46, used by USSOCOM when a heavier cartridge is required. It is officially classified as an LWMG (light weight machine gun) and was developed as a replacement for the Mk 43 Mod 0/1. The M60-based machine guns are a great deal more portable than the heavier M240-based designs used elsewhere in the U.S. military in the infantry medium machine gun role. The M60-based designs have a long history of insufficient reliability, however. Trials conducted through the mid-1990s led the U.S. Army to replace its M60 with M240B GPMGs. The M240B weighs in at ~27.5 lb and is about 49 inches long with the standard barrel. Due to this extra weight and size NAVSPECWAR was reluctant to give up the increased portability of the M60 (~22.5 lb, 37.7 inches OAL with the shortest "Assault Barrel") designs, despite the M240's increased reliability. A request was put in for a new machine gun in 2001, and FN responded with a scaled-up version of the M249 weighing in at ~18.5 lb with an OAL of ~39.5". This new design achieved much better reliability than the M60-based weapons while bettering its light weight and maintaining the same manual of arms as the already in-use M249. USSOCOM was slated to begin receiving deliveries of the new gun in August 2003.

==== Mk 48 Mod 1 ====
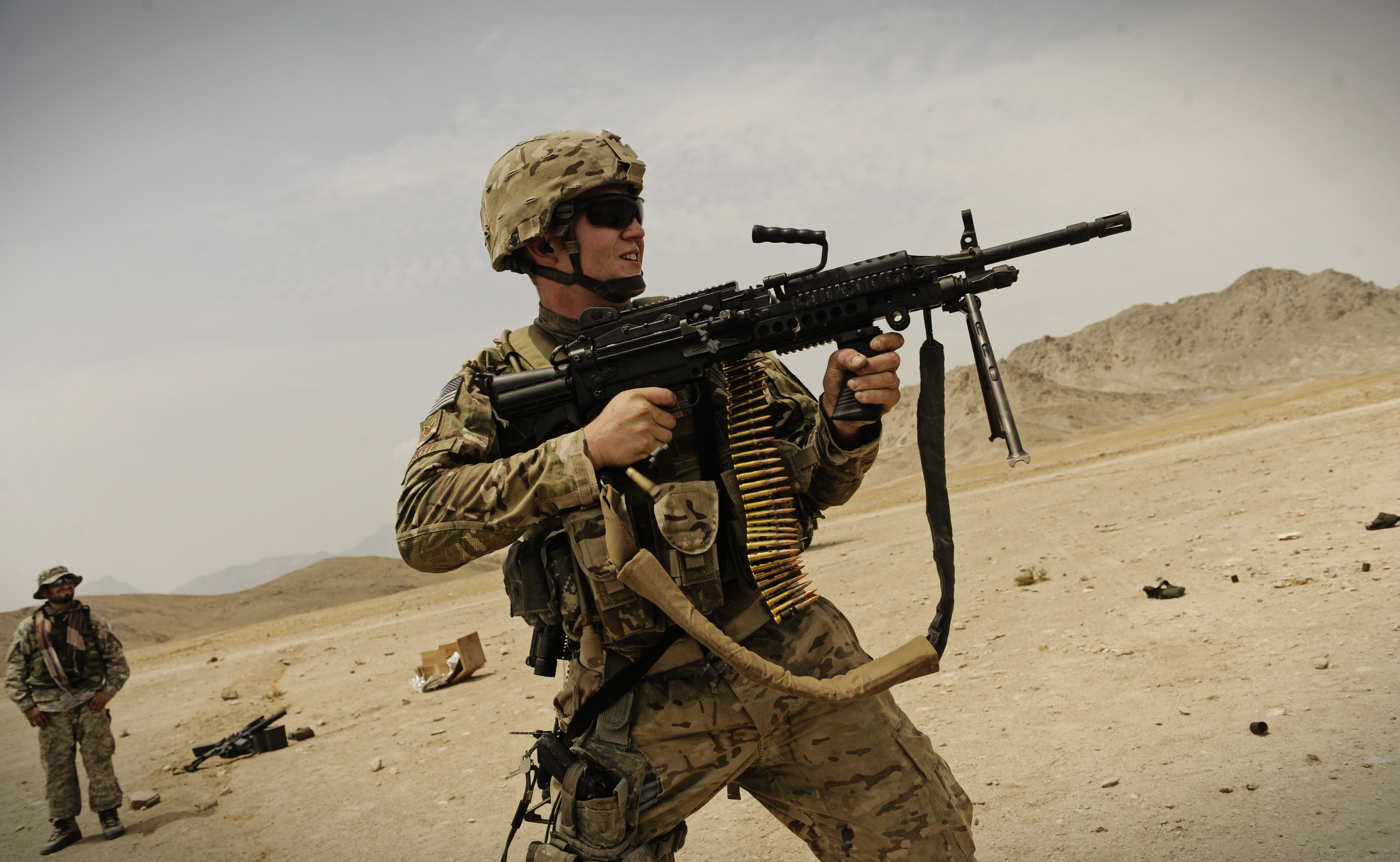
US Air Force Staff Sergeant with the Mk 48 Mod 1 in Afghanistan, 2011

The Mk 48 Mod 1 is an update of the Mk 48 Mod 0, which is also made in FN-America. Like the Mod 0, it is essentially an M249 scaled up to fire the 7.62×51mm NATO round. The Mod 1 utilizes a 19.75-inch barrel, weighs in at 18.37 lb unloaded. Major changes include the use of an adjustable buttstock, modified rail interface system, removal of the original hinged heat guard in favor of M249-style ones attached to the barrel, and modified bipod mount.

==== Mk 48 Mod 2 ====
At the National Defense Industry Association's annual Special Operations Forces Industry Conference (SOFIC), in May 2019, FN unveiled a prototype of its Mk 48 Mod 2 machine gun chambered for 6.5mm Creedmoor. It was developed in response to a USSOCOM requirement. American special operations forces are interested in acquiring a lightweight belt-fed "assault" machine gun, which would offer better range than existing weapons. Current production model is still chambered in 7.62×51mm NATO caliber.

=== M249S ===
The M249S is a semi-automatic only variant manufactured for the civilian sport and collector's market. It shares most major components of the M249 SAW with the exception of the firing mechanism and the addition of welded internal components to prevent automatic conversion. Notably, this variant retains the ability to be belt fed, an uncommon feature in civilian firearms.

In 2017, FN America released the M249S Para variant.

== Derivatives ==
=== Machine Gun Armory ===
==== MGA SAW ====
The MGA SAW (Squad Automatic Weapon) is a multi-caliber derivative based of the FN M249 SAW manufactured by Machine Gun Armory. It is available in 5.45×39mm, 5.56×45mm NATO, .300 AAC Blackout, 7.62×39mm, .260 Remington, 6.8mm Remington SPC, and 7.62×51mm NATO.

==== MGA SAW K ====
A sub-compact variant of the MGA SAW, which features a barrel length of 9.75 in (248 mm).

==== MGA SAW CB ====
A closed-bolt variant of the MGA SAW, it retains all the features of the original MGA SAW; the only difference is their operating mechanism.

=== Ohio Ordnance Works ===
==== OOW249 SAW ====
The OOW249 SAW (Squad Automatic Weapon) is a select fire derivative based of the FN M249 SAW manufactured by Ohio Ordnance Works. It retains the two gas regulator settings and is offered in a 21 in (533 mm) barrel length.

==== OOW249 Para ====
A paratrooper variant of the OOW249 SAW, which features a barrel length of 13 in (330 mm).

==== OOW249 Patrol ====
A variant similar to the OOW249 Para that is customizable at the unit level with compatibility for standard M4 buttstocks and weighs less than 2.3 lb (1 kg) compared to the OOW249 SAW.

== Users ==
A map with M249 SAW users in blue

- Afghanistan - captured by the Taliban.
- Argentina
- Colombia
- Czech Republic
- Georgia
- Haiti - used by the Temporary Anti-Gang Unit (UTAG) of the Haitian National Police.
- Hungary
- Iraq
- Lebanon
- Malaysia
- Kurdistan
- Nepal
- Pakistan
- Philippines
- Thailand
- Ukraine
- United States

=== Former users ===
- Afghanistan: Standard issue light machine gun of the Afghan National Army.

== See also ==
- Ares Shrike 5.56 – (United States)
- Daewoo Precision Industries K3 – (South Korea)
- Heckler & Koch MG4 – (Germany)
- IWI Negev – (Israel)
- RPL-20 – (Russia)
- Ultimax 100 – (Singapore)
- List of dual-feed firearms
- List of machine guns
