= Norma Precision =

Swedish ammunition manufacturer

Norma Precision AB
- Company type: Aktiebolag
- Industry: Arms
- Predecessor: Norma Projektilfabrik
- Founded: 1895 in Kristiania, Norway
- Headquarters: Åmotfors, Sweden
- Products: Ammunition
- Number of employees: 240
- Parent: Beretta Holding
- Website: www.norma-ammunition.com

Norma Precision AB, commonly referred to simply as Norma, is a Swedish manufacturer of firearm ammunition based in Åmotfors, Värmland.

== History ==
Norma was started in 1902 by three Norwegian brothers from Nordre Land Municipality, Lars Enger (1850-1917), Johan Enger (1852-1925) and Ivar Enger (1863-1942), whose company L.A.Enger & Co acquired an ammunition factory in Raufoss and later moved to Kristiania (modern day Oslo) as Norma Projektilfabrik A/S (Norma projectile factory stock company) a few years earlier in 1895. The name "Norma" has often been confused as a shorthand for Normandy or "Norge" (Norway in Nordic), however the name was actually chosen because Lars, the eldest of the three brothers, was very fond of the Italian opera Norma by Vincenzo Bellini.

The Swedish shooting movement needed a supplier and Norma Projektilfabrik A/S was asked to establish a local presence in Sweden. At this time, Sweden and Norway were in a union. The youngest of the three Enger brothers, Ivar (father of polar explorer Lillemor Rachlew), took a train to Sweden and simply got off at the first stop on the other side of the border, Charlottenberg, and made inquiries about a suitable factory building. However, he found that the town council was not interested in their plans and the only available site had already been taken by a tobacco factory, so he decided to try his luck further into Sweden. The next train stop was Åmotfors, where the Enger brothers were more welcomed and decided to establish their company.

Just before 1900, the father of the Enger brothers, Asmund Enger, obtained a handful of the secretive French Balle D projectiles through a friend during a shooting competition in Paris, and with the help of their foreman and ballistic engineer Karl Wang (1881-1951), the Enger brothers developed a process whereby a boat tail could be applied to a spitzer bullet in a very consistent manner, giving Norma an edge. From the start until the middle of the century, production was dominated by military ammunition standards. After some time, however, the company perceived a market for hunting ammunition. Norma was also beginning to make international connections which, combined with military interest, forced more modern thinking and necessitated new products.

Nils Kvale and Roy Weatherby were invaluable for Norma's success in the latter half of the 20th century. Kvale was a product developer for the company in the 1960s and introduced a number of new calibers such as the .308 Norma Magnum and .358 Norma Magnum to the market.

Today, Norma has a yearly production of 100 million rounds in 110 calibers.
