= 6×45mm SAW =

Experimental series of rifle cartridges

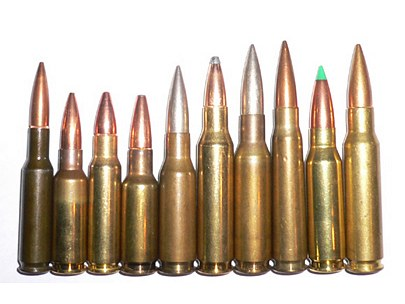
- From left to right: 6mm SAW, 6.5 Grendel, 6.8 SPC, 7mm Bench Rest, .280/30 British, 7mm-08, 7mm Second Optimum (Liviano), .276 Pedersen, .308×1.75", 7.62×51 NATO.
- Type: Rifle
- Place of origin: United States

Production history
- Designer: Frankford Arsenal
- Designed: Early 1970s

Specifications
- Case type: Rimless, Bottleneck
- Bullet diameter: 6.17 mm (0.243 in)
- Neck diameter: 6.63 mm (0.261 in)
- Shoulder diameter: 9.72 mm (0.383 in)
- Base diameter: 10.26 mm (0.404 in)
- Rim diameter: 10.36 mm (0.408 in)
- Case length: 45.01 mm (1.772 in)
- Overall length: 65.54 mm (2.580 in)
- Primer type: Boxer

Ballistic performance
Bullet mass/type	Velocity	Energy
105 gr (7 g)	2,520 ft/s (770 m/s)	1,488 ft⋅lbf (2,017 J)

The 6×45mm SAW describes an experimental series of rimless bottlenecked intermediate cartridges developed in the 1970s for the U.S. Army. The cartridges were produced in a variety of sizes and from a variety of materials. The intent was to develop a cartridge that would replace all 5.56×45mm NATO weapons as well as most 7.62×51mm NATO rifles and machine guns in the U.S. military. Eventually, the 5.56mm was retained and only the machine gun portion of the SAW (Squad Automatic Weapon) competition was successful. That program led to the M249 light machine gun.

Note that the dimensions listed to the right are for 6×45mm SAW rounds. Three versions were produced for testing in the early 1970s. An aluminum-cased version was developed, as well as the about 5 mm (0.20 in) longer 6mm SAW Long.

== Design and development ==
During the 1970s, the U.S. Army was looking to develop a new squad automatic weapon (SAW) that was lighter than the M60 machine gun with an effective range out to 800 m (2,600 ft). The 7.62 mm cartridge was too heavy and the 5.56 mm cartridge could not provide effective performance at that range. Research led to the development of the 6×45mm SAW cartridge. Its 105 gr (6.8 g) bullet had a muzzle velocity of 2,520 feet per second (770 m/s) and muzzle energy of 1,488 ft⋅lb (2,017 J). The relatively heavy bullet combined with a moderate velocity had optimum long-range performance. A light-alloy cased version of the round was also produced. Because aluminium alloy had a tendency to catch fire, the case length was extended to 50 mm (2.0 in) to make up for loss in capacity caused by the need to line the inside of the case with fire-resistant material. Although the 6mm SAW's performance proved satisfactory, there were supply concerns over adopting a third rifle caliber. Development of the 6mm SAW was abandoned when an improved 5.56 mm round was promised, which arrived as the M855. 6×45mm SAW cartridges depending on their case material and bullet weigh 10.6 to 15 grams (164 to 231 gr).

== Chambered firearms ==
- Brunswick machine gun
- Maremont XM233
- Ford Aerospace XM234
- Rodman Laboratories XM235
- Ford Aerospace XM248

== See also ==
- .276 Pedersen - Another US Army experimental cartridge that never saw service
- 6×45mm - A 5.56×45mm necked up to accept 6mm bullets but with a smaller case head diameter when compared to the 6mm SAW
- .22 Savage Hi-Power
- 5.8×42mm DBP87 The People's Republic of China standard-issue cartridge
- .243 Winchester
- Type 38 Rifle Cartridge
