= .358 Norma Magnum =

Rifle cartridge

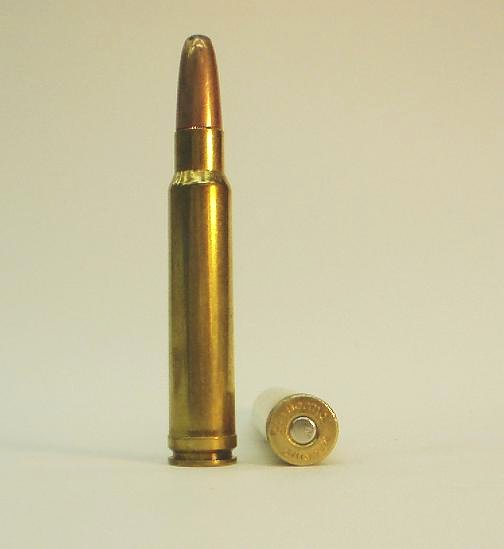
- .358 Norma Magnum rifle cartridge
- Type: Rifle
- Place of origin: Sweden

Production history
- Designer: Nils Kvale
- Designed: 1950's
- Manufacturer: Norma
- Produced: 1959–present

Specifications
- Case type: Belted, bottleneck
- Bullet diameter: .358 in (9.12 mm)
- Neck diameter: .388 in (9.85 mm)
- Shoulder diameter: .490 in (12.45 mm)
- Base diameter: .513 in (13.03 mm)
- Rim diameter: .531 in (13.50 mm)
- Rim thickness: .050 in (1.30 mm)
- Case length: 2.520 in (64 mm)
- Overall length: 3.346 in (85 mm)
- Primer type: Large rifle magnum

Ballistic performance
Bullet mass/type	Velocity	Energy
250 gr (16 g) Bonded SP	2,756 ft/s (840 m/s)	4,217 ft⋅lbf (5,717 J)

The .358 Norma Magnum is a rifle cartridge introduced in 1959 by Norma. The cartridge is closely related to the .308 Norma Magnum and both cartridges share the same case head dimensions as the .300 H&H Magnum, but have far less body taper, resulting in the same internal capacity in a shorter case. The cartridge case is the longest that will comfortably fit in a standard Mauser action, or any rifle action designed to chamber the .30-06. The .358 NM was the first .35 caliber cartridge commercially developed and sold to the American market since the decline of the .35 Newton in the late 1920s.

== Uses ==
Though introduced by a Swedish company, the .358 Norma Magnum was designed for American hunters, due to Norma's chief designer Nils Kvale's close contacts with American colleagues. It is intended as a cartridge for the largest of North American game - elk, moose, brown bear, bighorn sheep, and bison, and shoots fast and flat enough to be useful to 400 to 500 yards on game the size of American elk (Wapiti). While it is needlessly powerful for deer-sized game, it can be used, at least with the heavier (and therefore slower) .358 bullets on such game without destroying too much meat. It would work well, with properly designed bullets, on most large African species. But laws prohibiting the use of bullets smaller than 0.375-inch (0.95 cm) on dangerous game, in most African countries, limit its use to "plains game," including the largest antelope, the one-ton eland.

Norma took a gamble, introducing the .358 only as new empty cases for handloaders, and chamber reamer specifications for gunsmiths who made custom rifles—there were no factory rifles available, and it was several months before factory-loaded ammunition appeared. The cartridge proved immediately popular with hunters and custom gunsmiths, and within a year the Danish firm of Schultz & Larsen chambered its Model 65 for the round, and Husqvarna its Series 1600 and 1650 rifles.

The .358 Norma is what is known as a "short magnum," designed to work in long rifle actions; many .30-06 rifles such as the 1903 Springfield rifle have been rebarreled to the much-more powerful .358 Norma. Norma's factory ammunition for the .358 Norma drives a 250-grain bullet at 2880 fps and produces more than 4,600 ft-lbs (foot-pounds) of kinetic energy at the muzzle, while delivering a foot-ton of energy 500 yards downrange.

== See also ==
- .338 Winchester Magnum
- .35 Whelen
- .350 Remington Magnum
- .358 Winchester
- .375 H&H Magnum
- 9.3×62mm
- 9.3×74mmR
- 9.3×64mm Brenneke
- 9 mm caliber
- List of rifle cartridges
- Table of handgun and rifle cartridges
