= .308 Norma Magnum =

Rifle cartridge

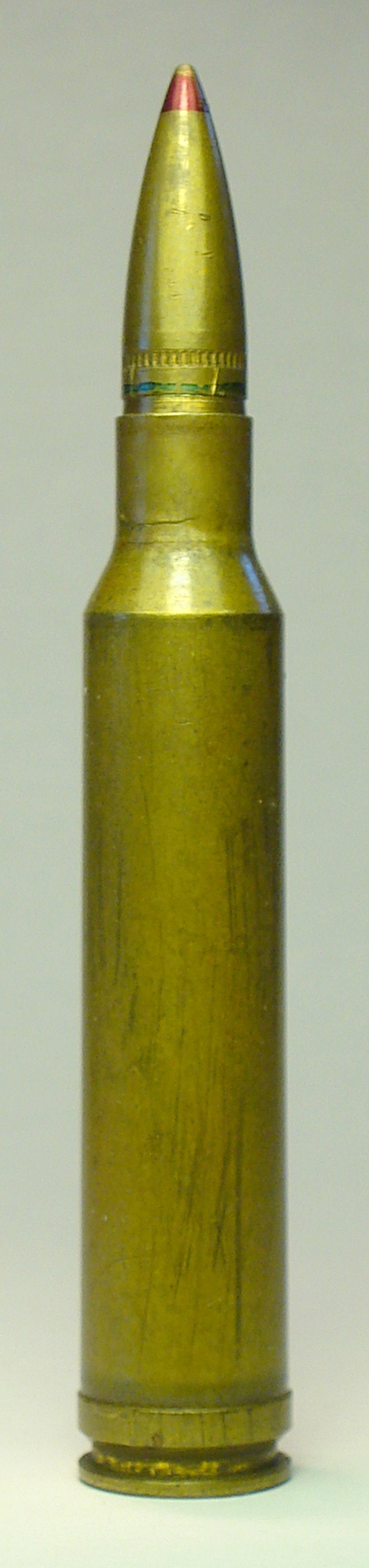
- .308 Norma magnum cartridge
- Type: Rifle
- Place of origin: Sweden

Production history
- Designer: Nils Kvale, Norma
- Designed: 1960
- Manufacturer: Norma
- Produced: 1960–present

Specifications
- Parent case: .300 H&H Magnum
- Case type: Rimless, Belted, bottleneck
- Bullet diameter: .308 in (7.8 mm)
- Neck diameter: .317 in (8.1 mm)
- Base diameter: .513 in (13.0 mm)
- Rim diameter: .532 in (13.5 mm)
- Case length: 2.559 in (65.0 mm)
- Overall length: 3.345 in (85.0 mm)
- Primer type: Large rifle magnum
- Maximum pressure: 55,100 psi (380 MPa)

Ballistic performance
Bullet mass/type	Velocity	Energy
200 gr (13 g)	2,903 ft/s (885 m/s)	3,744 ft⋅lbf (5,076 J)

The .308 Norma Magnum (7.62×65mmBR) cartridge was created by Nils Kvale at Norma, Sweden. Like the larger .358 Norma Magnum it is based on a shortened 300 H&H magnum. It very closely resembled the wildcat .30-338 Magnum cartridge.

Kvale designed a wildcat cartridge, the 8mm Kvale, in 1949. This gave a magnum power cartridge by rechambering surplus 8mm Mauser M98 rifles. The lessons learned from this cartridge were put into the .308 and .358 Norma Magnum.

While still popular, the .308 Norma Magnum has been largely supplanted by the .300 Winchester Magnum, mainly due to the availability of rifles chambered in this caliber.

== See also ==
- 7 mm caliber
- List of rifle cartridges
- Table of handgun and rifle cartridges
