= Savage Striker =

- Type: Pistol
- Place of origin: USA

Production history
- Manufacturer: Savage Arms
- Produced: 1999–2005

Specifications
- Length: 570 mm (22 in)
- Barrel length: 360 mm (14 in)
- Cartridge: .22 LR,.22 WMR,.223 Rem,.22-250 Rem,.243 Win, 7mm-08 Rem,.260 Rem,.308 Win, 7mm WSM,.300 WSM

The Savage Striker was a bolt action pistol produced from 1999 to 2005 by Savage Arms for metallic silhouette shooting and hunting. The pistol was based on the action of the Savage Model 110 and was sold with a composite stock, originally with a center grip, but later also with a rear grip as an alternative. The pistol was designed for right handed shooters, and had a loading port on the right side and the charging handle on the left. The pistol grip itself, however, was made to be ambidextrous, such that the pistol also could be fired comfortably by left handed shooters.

== Models ==
=== Model 501/502F Striker ===
The model 501/502F Striker was produced from 2000 to 2005 and chambered for .22 LR (Model 501F) and .22 WMR (Model 502F) with 5 eller 10 round magazines. Its total length was 480 mm (18.6 inches), with a 250 mm barrel (10 inches) and a weight of 1814 grams (4 pound). It was delivered with a mount for attaching a scope sight and ambidextrous grip.

=== Model 510/516 Striker ===
The model 510/516 Striker was produced from 1998 to 2005. It had a stainless finish with a left handed charging handle and right hand ejection. It chambered for .223 Rem, .22-250 Rem, .243 Win, 7mm-08 Rem, .260 Rem, and .308 Win with two or three round magazines. Its total length was 570 mm (22.5 inches) (or 610 mm (1 foot) for the rear grip version) and 360 mm barrel (14 inches). It was delivered with a mount for attaching a scope sight. Model variants included: 510F, 516FSAK, 516FSS, 516FSAK and 516BSS. It was short action, with different bolt heads depending on the caliber group rim size and used a standard small shank Savage barrel. The factory trigger setup was changed multiple times over the course of production.

== See also ==
- Remington XP-100
- Thompson/Center Contender
