= Rodman Laboratories XM235 =

Rodman XM235
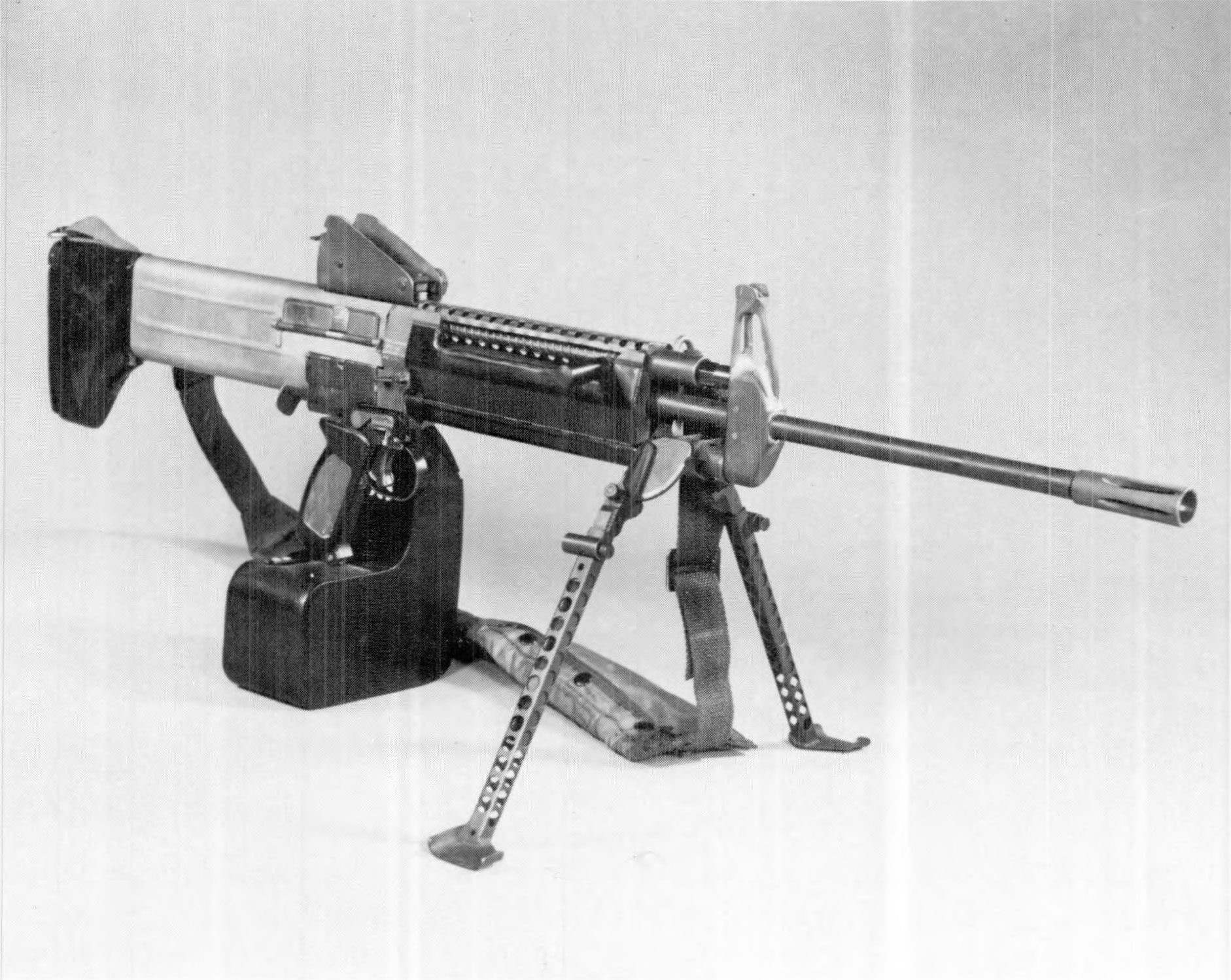
- Rodman XM235 Light machine gun prototype
- Type: Light machine gun
- Place of origin: United States

Production history
- Manufacturer: Rodman
- Variants: ARRADCOM prototype XM235; XM248

Specifications
- Mass: 5.3kg
- Length: 1060mm
- Barrel length: 609mm
- Cartridge: 6×45mm SAW
- Caliber: 6mm
- Barrels: 1
- Action: Gas
- Rate of fire: 500rpm
- Feed system: Belt feed

The Rodman Laboratories XM235 was one of the contenders for the squad automatic weapon (SAW) trials in 1975–1976.

== Development ==
The Fabrique Nationale Minimi (designated XM249), Heckler & Koch HK23 (designated XM262), and a heavy-barreled version of the M16 (designated the XM106) were used as a control group. They were supposed to be used to figure out a baseline for the SAW contenders, which were the experimental group. They were already eliminated from consideration because they were chambered for the 5.56mm NATO cartridge.

The XM235 they designed was merely a prototype and Rodman Laboratories didn't have the facilities or expertise to copy and mass produce it. When the XM235 was selected for the 5.56mm SAW trials, Maremont Corporation and Ford Aerospace and Communication bid on the rights to make an improved model rechambered in 5.56mm designated the XM238.

== Ammunition ==
The XM235 was chambered for the experimental 6×45mm SAW cartridge. It had a 105-grain [6.8 gram] projectile and had a muzzle velocity of 2450 feet / second [747 meters / second]. The cartridge was intermediate in size between the 5.56×45mm NATO and 7.62×51mm NATO rounds and was considered essential for the SAW concept. The current 5.56×45mm NATO tracer round was not effective in daylight conditions beyond 800 meters, the proposed effective range for the hypothetical SAW system.

The difficulty of standardizing and supplying a third cartridge, as well as the political bramble the US would have to clamber through to force its approval on their NATO allies, led to the dropping of the requirement that the SAW be chambered in 6mm. The next round of testing (1979-1980) would use weapons chambered for the 5.56mm NATO round.

== Overview ==
The XM235 is gas-operated and belt-fed. The belt is carried in a "b"-shaped drum magazine. The "b"-shaped drum magazine is used due to the bullpup layout, so as not to affect the grip under the weapon.

The gun receiver is composed of two long round tubes, which are positioned by the main hoop and the front tube. It is the main component of the whole gun, and other parts are installed on these two round tubes. The main hoop is used to support the rear end of the barrel (with the barrel fixing bolt handle inside), and it is also a fixing part for the firing mechanism and the rear sight. In addition to supporting the front end of the barrel, the front tube is also equipped with two gas guides to drive the entire working mechanism of the gun. Since the two round tubes of the receiver are located on both sides of the barrel axis, and the center of gravity of the gun is on the barrel axis, the forces during shooting are quite symmetrical, so the gun is also easy to control. The dust cover and front stock connected to the receiver are not the main components. Without these two components, the machine gun can still operate normally.

The belt feed is mounted on the upper receiver tube and is engaged with a piston rod. A sprocket feed mechanism is mounted on it, and the sprocket rotates around the lower receiver tube. This feed mechanism includes a sprocket, a bullet-stopping tooth spring, a mechanism to prevent the sprocket from reversing, and a sprocket release device. The entire mechanism is placed in the receiver seat, which rests on the rear end surface of the main sleeve. The feed mechanism is driven by a curved groove barrel assembly, which has a driving ratchet and a cycloidal cam groove (curved groove), the latter of which is driven by the feed guide column at the bottom of the frame. Since the cycloidal cam groove is long, the feeding cycle of the XM235 is also long, so the feeding action is smooth and continuous, and there will be no sudden and intermittent feeding action on ordinary machine guns. Another advantage of this feed mechanism is that it has fewer components, and the total number of parts is only 1/3 of the feed mechanism of the M60 or MG3 machine gun. In addition, there are dust covers on the feed port and ejection port on both sides of the receiver.

The weapon comes with two interchangeable piston rods, a frame and a bolt. The piston rod is located above the barrel and is connected to the frame by means of a feed guide. The handle is fixed to the right side of the piston rod, and the recoil spring is wound around the piston rod. There are firing pin cocking slopes and opening and locking slopes in the bolt, and there are three locking protrusions at the front end. The entire bolt assembly consists of components such as the firing pin, the bullet pusher protrusion, the shell extractor and the ejector, which all reciprocate along the upper receiver tube with the weapon. The firing pin is cocked during recoil, and when it recoils to 2.5mm from the front, the firing pin is released, striking the primer and firing the bullet.

The buttstock is equipped with a hydraulic pneumatic buffer with good buffering effect. In addition, the bolt has a long recoil stroke and the recoil of the 6×45mm bullet is also low. Therefore, the recoil of the XM235 is very low. The maximum recoil is only about 90 kg, which is much lower than the recoil of other general-purpose machine guns.

The barrel can be replaced quickly. The barrel assembly includes a flash suppressor, a gas band, a barrel extension, etc. There are gas holes on the upper and lower gas bands, a locking slot in the barrel extension, and the chamber and the bore are chrome-plated. The barrel has a metal plate jacket and forestock on the outside, which is stuck on the receiver tube and becomes one with the gun. The top of the jacket is actually a spring-loaded folding cover, which can be opened to quickly replace the barrel.

The pistol grip/fire control group of the XM235 is positioned offset to the right of the receiver, in order to enable the ammo box is placed below the center of gravity to balance the weapon, but this makes it almost impossible for "left-handed" soldiers to operate it. The trigger guard can be opened to enable the use of leather gloves.

== Rodman Laboratories ==
The facility was part of the Rock Island Arsenal campus. It was named for Lt.-Col. Thomas Jackson Rodman, who helped found Rock Island Arsenal in 1865 and was its commander until his death in 1871.

The team that worked on the XM235 was headed by Curtis D. Johnson. It was composed of Lonnie D. Antwiler, Larry C. McFarland, Arthur R. Meyer, Fred J. Skahill, Doyle L. White, Keith L. Witwer, and Richard L. Wulff.

== Gallery ==
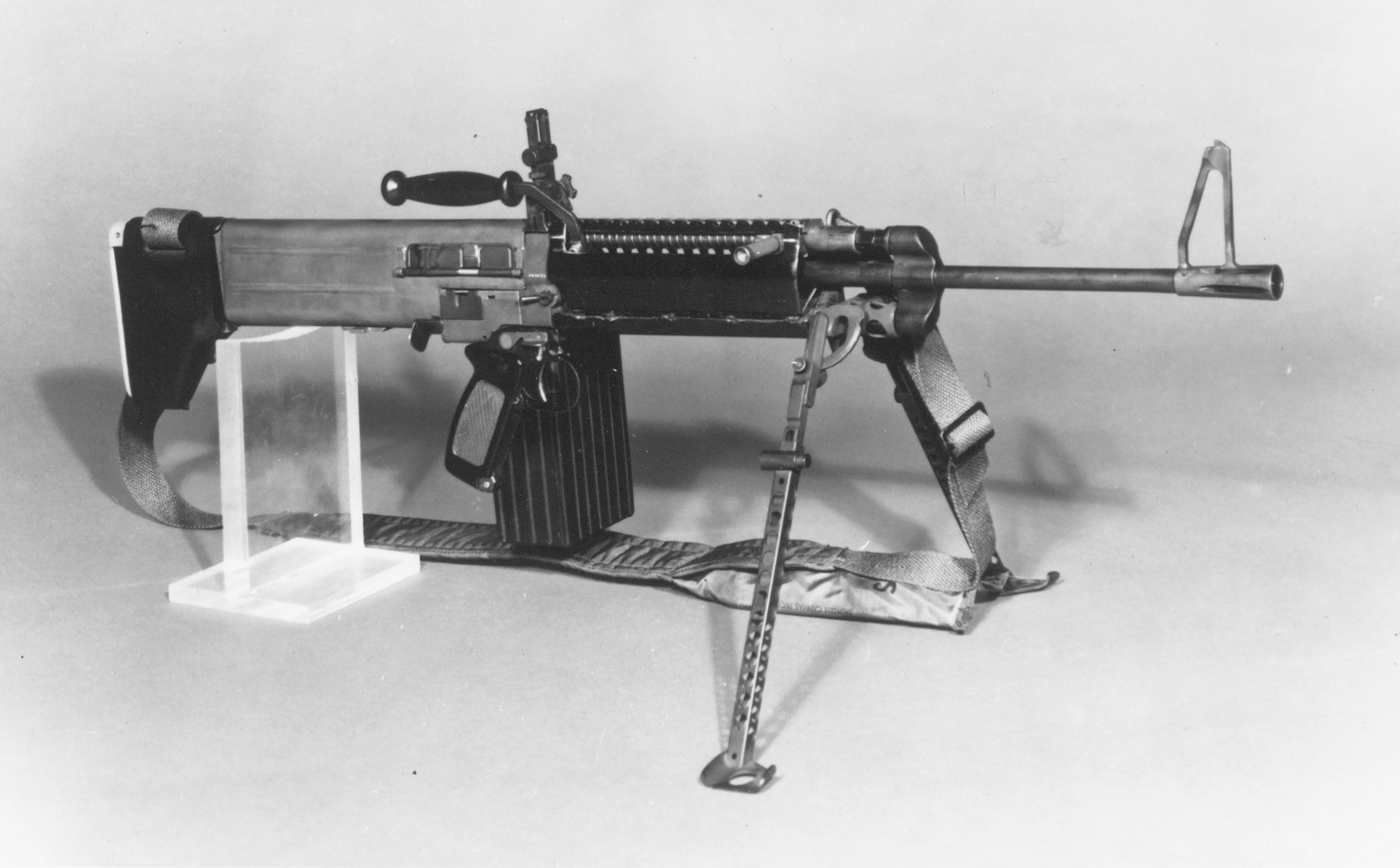
ARRADCOM Squad Automatic Weapon System (SAWS) Prototype intended to replace the M16A1 in the automatic role

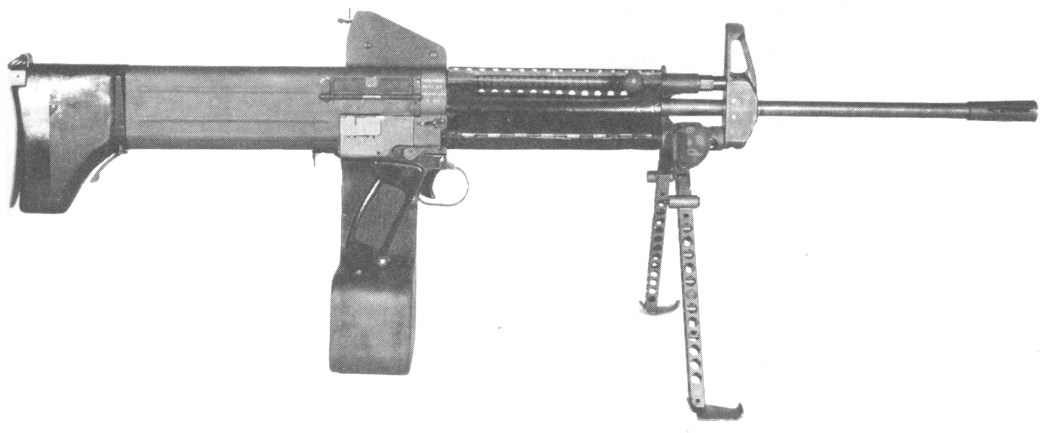
XM235 US Army, Rodman Laboratory, Rock Island, Illinois, 6x45mm SAW

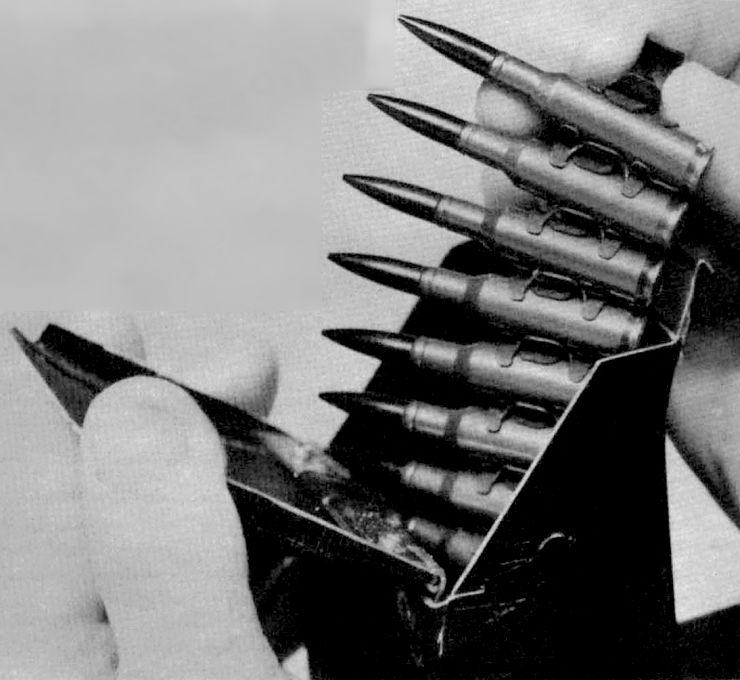
The ammunition box from the Rodman XM235 SAW showing the belted XM732 6mm cartridges

== See also ==
- List of machine guns
- Brunswick machine gun
- Colt Machine Gun
- Ford Aerospace XM234
