= Remington Model 600 =

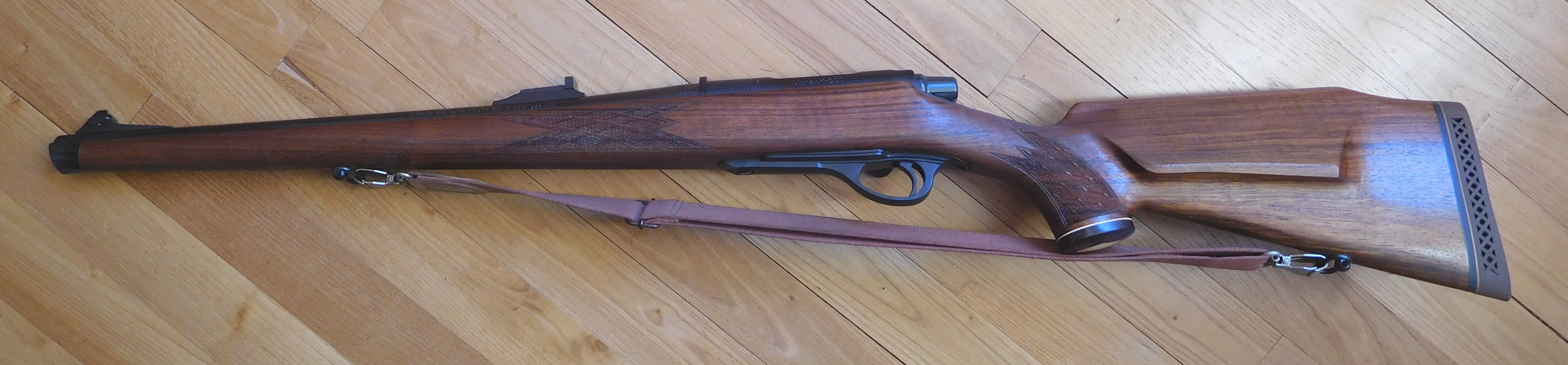
- A Remington Model 600 in .243 Winchester.
- Type: Bolt-action rifle
- Place of origin: United States

Production history
- Designer: Remington R&D
- Manufacturer: Remington Arms
- Produced: 1964–1967 (original); 1971–1980 (Model 600 Mohawk)
- No. built: 94,086
- Variants: see Variants

Specifications
- Mass: 5.5 lb (2.5 kg)
- Length: 37.25 in (94.6 cm)
- Barrel length: 18.5 in (47 cm)
- Cartridge: .222 Remington.223 Remington; 6mm Remington; 6.5mm Remington Magnum.243 Winchester.308 Winchester.35 Remington.350 Remington Magnum
- Barrels: Round with ventilated nylon rib
- Action: Bolt action
- Feed system: Push feed
- Sights: Blade ramp font, fully adjustable rear.

Remington Arms Model 600 was a push feed bolt-action rifle produced by Remington Arms from 1964 to 1968. While it is commonly believed that production ended in 1967, according to Remington representatives records indicate that it actually ended in 1968. This Model was the precursor to the Model 660 (manufactured 1968–1971); the Model Mohawk 600 (manufactured 1972–1979); and the Model 673 (manufactured 2003–2004).

== Overview ==
The Model 600 was designed to be a guide rifle. Its most noticeable feature was the vent rib barrel. There were approximately 94,086 rifles produced in the available calibers of: .222 Remington, .223 Remington, 6mm Remington, 6.5mm Remington Magnum, .243 Winchester, .308 Winchester, .35 Remington, .350 Remington Magnum.

The rarest is the one chambered in .223 Remington; only 227 were produced—most in the final year of production. Before it was officially added to the line, you could order a Model 600 out of the custom gun shop in .223. At least one Model 600 in .223 came out of the Remington Custom Shop in 1966. A successor model, the Remington Mohawk 600 ('72-'79) available in .222, .243 and .308 comprised total production of only 142 with a Mannlicher-style stock. But the rarest Original Model 600 was and remains the .223.

== Variants ==
There were several variations in the original production line and they were the: (1) 600 Magnum Carbine, (2) 75th Anniversary Montana Statehood/100th Anniversary Montana Territory &, (3) Remington 600 Mohawk

=== Remington Model 600 Magnum ===
Same as the Model 600 except that it was available in 6.5mm Remington Magnum and .350 Remington Magnum. Also featured a laminated walnut stock, recoil pad and sling.

=== Remington Model 600 Mohawk ===
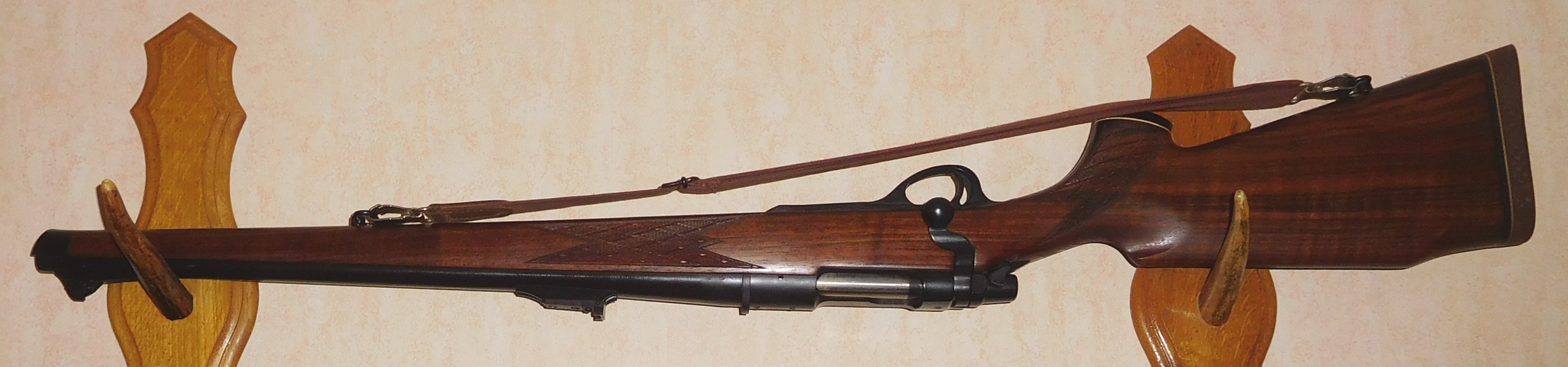
Model 600 Mohawk.

Same specs as the Model 600 except featuring an 18.5 in (47 cm) barrel with no rib. It was a promotional model produced from 1971-1980.

== Popularity ==
While loved by the majority of its owners, the death knell of the original Model 600 and its descendants were its looks; it was largely despised by critics, even though it shot exceptionally well. The original barrel length of 18.5 inches resulted in more felt muzzle blast, especially in the .350 Rem Mag. This actuality and perception led to failure of the .350 Rem Mag cartridge in the later guns of different models too. Remington finally abandoned the cartridge in the late 1970s, until resurrected in 2003 with the Model 673.

The 600 series received attention through the writings of Jeff Cooper, who used the model 600 as the basis for his "Scout I" and "Super Scout" scout rifles.
