= .350 Remington Magnum =

Rifle cartridge

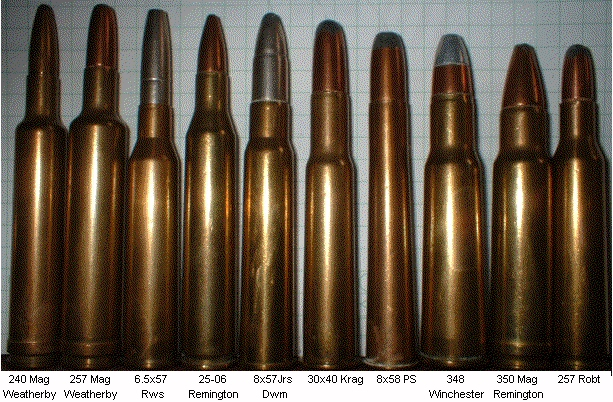
- The .350 Remington Magnum is second from the right
- Type: Rifle
- Place of origin: USA

Production history
- Designer: Remington
- Designed: 1965
- Manufacturer: Remington
- Produced: 1965–present

Specifications
- Parent case: 7mm Remington Magnum
- Case type: Belted, bottleneck
- Bullet diameter: .358 in (9.1 mm)
- Neck diameter: .388 in (9.9 mm)
- Shoulder diameter: .495 in (12.6 mm)
- Base diameter: .532 (13.51 mm)
- Rim diameter: .532 in (13.5 mm)
- Rim thickness: .220 in (5.6 mm)
- Case length: 2.170 in (55.1 mm)
- Overall length: 2.800 in (71.1 mm)
- Rifling twist: 1-16"
- Primer type: Large rifle magnum

Ballistic performance
| Bullet mass/type | Velocity | Energy |
|---|---|---|
| 200 gr (13 g) SP | 3,008 ft/s (917 m/s) | 4,019 ft⋅lbf (5,449 J) |
| 225 gr (15 g) SP | 2,738 ft/s (835 m/s) | 3,746 ft⋅lbf (5,079 J) |
| 250 gr (16 g) SP | 2,576 ft/s (785 m/s) | 3,685 ft⋅lbf (4,996 J) |
- Test barrel length: 20"; Source(s): Accurate Powder

The .350 Remington Magnum was introduced in 1965 by the Remington Arms Company for the Model 600 rifle. It was later offered in the Model 660, Model 673, and Model 700 rifles, as well as the XP-100. It was discontinued as a regular factory chambering in 1974 after a poor sales record.

== History ==
The .350 Remington Magnum features a short, large diameter case, similar in design to the contemporary short magnums, though it is a belted design derived from the .375 H&H Magnum family of cartridges. Its nearest equivalent, the .35 Whelen, was still a wildcat in 1965, though the .358 Norma Magnum had been commercialized six years prior. The case design of the .350 Magnum allowed for its use in compact, fast-handling rifles. Though the Remington 600 and 660 chambered for the cartridge offered an excellent power-to-weight ratio, the combination failed to attain commercial success.

Maximum pressure for the .350 Magnum is set at 53,000 CUP by SAAMI.

== Use ==
The .350 Remington Magnum is a powerful cartridge primarily intended for use in "brush guns," which can readily be maneuvered in environments where hunting opportunities appear and disappear quickly at relatively close ranges. The .350 Remington Magnum is capable of taking any game animal on the North American continent effectively and humanely. Ballistically it is almost identical to the popular 9.3×62mm rifle cartridge, which has achieved widespread acceptance in African and European hunting fields.

== See also ==
- .35 Whelen
- .358 Winchester
- List of rifle cartridges
- 9 mm caliber other cartridges of similar size.
- Table of handgun and rifle cartridges
