= Thompson/Center Contender =

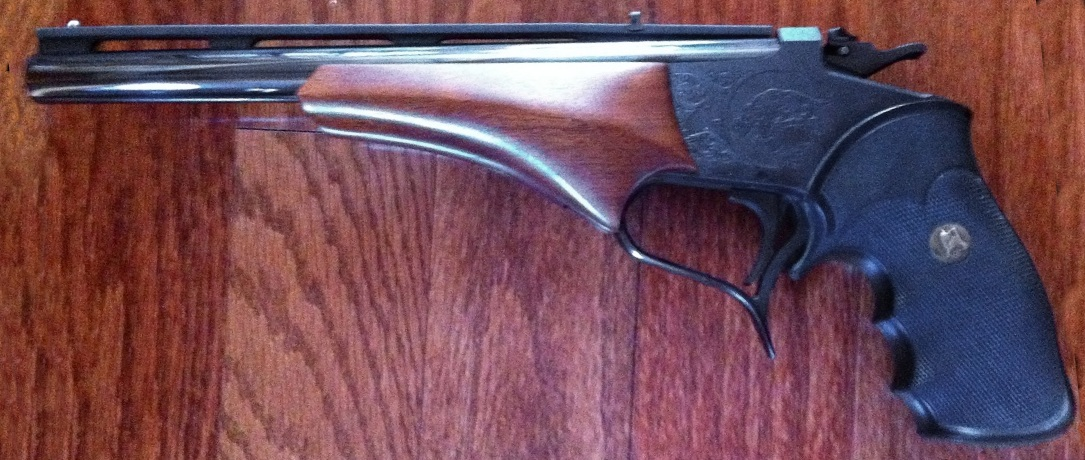
- Thompson/Center Contender pistol
- Type: Break-action
- Place of origin: United States

Production history
- Designed: 1967
- Manufacturer: Thompson/Center
- Produced: 1967–2000

Specifications
- Caliber: Various
- Action: Single-action
- Feed system: Single-shot
- Sights: Various

The Thompson/Center Contender is a break-action single-shot pistol or rifle that was introduced in 1967 by Thompson/Center Arms. It can be chambered in cartridges from .17 Bumble Bee to .45-70 Government.

== History ==
Warren Center, working in his basement shop in the 1960s, developed a unique, break-action, single-shot pistol. In 1965, Center joined the K.W. Thompson Tool Company and they introduced this design as the Thompson-Center Contender in 1967. Although they cost more than some hunting revolvers, the flexibility of being able to shoot multiple calibers by simply changing the barrel and sights and its higher accuracy made it popular with handgun hunters. As K.W. Thompson Tool began marketing Center's Contender pistol, the company name was changed to Thompson/Center Arms Company.

Originally the chamberings were on the low end of the recoil spectrum such as .22 LR, .22 WMR, .22 Hornet, .38 Special, and .22 Remington Jet, but as Magnum calibers took off in the 1970s, the Contender quickly became very popular with shooting enthusiasts.

== Design ==
The most unusual feature of the Contender is how the barrel is attached to the frame. By removing the fore-end, a large hinge pin is exposed; by pushing this hinge pin out, the barrel can be removed. Since the sights and extractor remain attached to the barrel in the Contender design, the frame itself contains no cartridge-specific features. A barrel of another caliber or length can be installed and pinned in place, the fore-end replaced, and the pistol is ready to shoot with a different barrel and pre-aligned sights. This allowed easy changes of calibers, sights, and barrel lengths, with only a flat screwdriver being required for this change.

The Contender frame has two firing pins, and a selector on the exposed hammer, to allow the shooter to choose between rimfire or centerfire firing pins, or to select a safety position from which neither firing pin can strike a primer. The initial baseline design of the Contender had no central safe position on the hammer, having only centerfire and rimfire firing pin positions, each being selectable through using a screwdriver.

Three variants of the original Contender design were later developed, distinguished easily by the hammer design. The first variant has a push button selector on the hammer for choosing rimfire vs. centerfire, the second variant has a left-center-right toggle switch for selecting center fire-safe-rimfire firing pins, and the third variant has a horizontal bolt selection for choosing center fire-safe-rimfire firing pin positions. All three of these Contender variants have a cougar etched on the sides of the receiver, thereby easily distinguishing them from the later G2 Contender which has a smooth-sided receiver without an etched cougar. Some of the very earliest Contenders, those requiring a screwdriver to switch the firing pin between rimfire and centerfire, had smooth sides, without the cougar etched on the sides.

The original Contender designs have an adjustable trigger, allowing the shooter to change both take-up and overtravel, permitting user selection of a range of trigger pulls ranging from a fairly heavy trigger pull suitable for carrying the pistol while hunting to a "hair trigger" suitable for long range target shooting (see accurize).

Unlike the later G2 Contender, the original Contender may be safely dry-fired (provided the hammer is not drawn back from the second notch) to allow a shooter to become familiar with the trigger pull. The break-action only has to be cycled, while leaving the hammer in the second notch position, to practice dry-firing. G2s with switchable firing pins (centerfire or rimfire) can be safely dry-fired with the hammer only in the safety (center) position.

== Barrels ==
Barrels have been made in lengths of 6, 8 3/4, 10, 12, 14, 16, 21 and 24 inches (150, 220, 250, 300, 360, 410, 530 and 610 mm). Heavier recoiling cartridge barrels have been made with integral muzzle brakes. Barrels for the original Contender may be used on the later-released G2 Contender and G2 barrels may be used on original Contender frames with a serial number greater than 195000.

The earliest barrels, from early 1967 to late 1967, were all octagonal with a flat bottom lug, and were available in only 10 and 8 3/4 inches (250 and 220 mm) lengths. The next group of barrels, from late 1967 to 1972, were available in 6, 8 3/4 and 10 inches (150, 220 and 250 mm) lengths. Later, round barrels were added in a wider variety of lengths, including 10, 12 and 14 inches (250, 300 and 360 mm). Likewise, round barrels in heavier (bull) barrel configurations, known as Super 14 pistol and Super 16 pistol barrels, respectively, were added. Carbine barrels in 16 and 21 in (410 and 530 mm) were added for the Contenders.

Sights on all the pistol barrels have varied, ranging from low iron sights, only, in the earlier years to a choice of either low or high iron sights, as well as no sights, for those pistol barrels intended for use with a scope. Various barrels have sometimes included ejectors as well as extractors, or extractors only, as well as containing either a flat bottom lug, a stepped bottom lug, or split bottom lugs. On barrels with an extractor only, about a quarter of the empty cartridge is extracted when the mechanism is opened. Barrels have been made available in either blued or stainless configurations, to match the finish available on Contender receivers.

Unlike most other firearm actions, the break-action design does not require the barrels to be specially fitted to an individual action. Any barrel, with the exception of a Herrett barrel, that is made for a Contender will fit onto any frame, allowing the shooter to purchase additional barrels in different calibers for a fraction of the cost of a complete firearm. Since the sights are mounted on the barrel, they remain sighted-in and zeroed between barrel changes.

== Stocks ==
Pistol grips, butt stocks and fore-ends have been made available in stained walnut, or in recoil reducing composite materials. Different pistol fore-ends are required for the octagonal versus the round versus the bull barrels. The fore-ends have had an assortment of either one or two screw attachment points, used for attaching the fore-ends to the barrel with its matching one or two attachment points. Universally, the fore-ends, in addition to attaching to the barrel, cover the single hinge pin that connects the barrel to the receiver.

The wood stocks and forend are made specifically for Thompson Center by a sawmill in Kansas.

== Calibers ==
Calibers available for the Contender were initially limited, stopping just short of the .308 Winchester-class rifle cartridges. However, almost any cartridge from .22 Long Rifle through .30-30 Winchester is acceptable, as long as a peak pressure of 48,000 CUP is not exceeded. This flexibility prompted a boom in the development of wildcat cartridges suitable for the Contender, such as the 7-30 Waters and.357 Herrett and the various TCU cartridges, most of which were commonly based on either the widely available .30-30 Winchester or .223 Remington cases. The largest factory caliber offered for the Contender was the .45-70, which, although a much larger case than the.308, is still feasible because of the relatively low cartridge pressures of the original black-powder round relative to the limits of the bolt face of the Contender receiver. Custom gunmakers have added to the selection, such as the J. D. Jones line of JDJ cartridges based on the .225 Winchester and .444 Marlin. Other barrel makers pushed beyond the limits the factory set, and chambered Contender barrels in lighter.308-class cartridges like the .243 Winchester. The Contender can fire .410 bore shotgun shells, either through the .45 Colt/.410 barrel or through a special 21-inch (530 mm) smoothbore shotgun barrel. A ported, rifled, .44 Magnum barrel was made available for use with shotshell cartridges in a removable-choke.44 Magnum barrel, with the choke being used to unspin the shot from the barrel rifling, or, by removing the choke, for use with standard.44 Magnum cartridges. The degree of flexibility provided by the Contender design is unique for experimenting with new cartridges, handloads, barrel lengths, and shotshells.

== G2 ==
The original Contender is now known as the generation one (G1) Contender and was replaced by the G2 Contender in 1998. The new design is dimensionally the same as the original Contender, but uses an Encore-style trigger group. Due to the changes in the trigger mechanism, and to differences in the angle of the grip relative to the boreline of the gun, the buttstocks and pistol grips are different between the G1 and G2 Contenders and will not interchange. The G2 uses essentially the same barrels and fore-ends as the original Contender and barrels will interchange, with the only two exceptions being the G2 muzzleloading barrels, which will only fit the G2 frame, and the Herrett barrels/fore-ends, which are specific for use only on a G1 frame.

== Years of manufacture ==
Starting in 1967, the Contender was discontinued in 2000. The year of manufacture is determined by the serial numbers as follows:

Serial Number For Blue Contender
| Year | January Thru June | | July Thru December | |
| 1967 | 1001 | 2250 | | |
| 1968 | 2251 | 3060 | 3061 | 4330 |
| 1969 | 4331 | 7500 | 7501 | 11075 |
| 1970 | 11076 | 14501 | 14502 | 15360 |
| 1971 | 15361 | 16850 | 16851 | 17885 |
| 1972 | 17886 | 19800 | 19801 | 22400 |
| 1973 | 22401 | 24750 | 24751 | 27090 |
| 1974 | 27091 | 30100 | 30101 | 34500 |
| 1975 | 34501 | 38401 | 38402 | 47890 |
| 1976 | 47891 | 60670 | 60671 | 67875 |
| 1977 | 67876 | 74825 | 74826 | 80398 |
| 1978 | 80399 | 91872 | 91873 | 108344 |
| 1979 | 108345 | 133856 | 133857 | 153636 |
| 1980 | 153637 | 169090 | 169091 | 173516 |
| 1981 | 173517 | 181663 | 181664 | 196703 |
| 1982 | 196704 | 208412 | 208413 | 220806 |
| 1983 | 220807 | 227176 | 227177 | 234850 |
| 1984 | 234851 | 246791 | 246792 | 256525 |
| 1985 | 256526 | 265000 | 265001 | 273800 |
| 1986 | 273801 | 287000 | 287001 | 297200 |
| 1987 | 297201 | 310599 | 310600 | 317099 |
| 1988 | 317100 | 327999 | 328000 | 335200 |
| 1989 | 335201 | 351700 | 351701 | 357200 |
| 1990 | 357201 | 366900 | 366901 | 370677 |
| 1991 | 370678 | 382852 | 382853 | 386697 |
| 1992 | 386698 | 399679 | 399680 | 407884 |
| 1993 | 407885 | 411796 | 411797 | 418410 |
| 1994 | 418411 | 427890 | 427891 | 430597 |
| 1995 | 430598 | 435934 | 435935 | 438365 |
| 1996 | 438366 | 443306 | 443307 | 446201 |
| 1997 | 446202 | 446735 | 446736 | 450227 |
| 1998 | 450228 | 452512 | 452513 | 453321 |
| 1999 | 453322 | 455590 | 455591 | 456568 |
| 2000 | 456569 | | | |

Serial Number For Stainless Contender
| Year | January Thru June | | July Thru December | |
| 1990 | | | | |
| 1991 | | | | |
| 1992 | | | | |
| 1993 | S1100 | S11666 | S11667 | S14723 |
| 1994 | S14724 | S18041 | S18042 | S23103 |
| 1995 | S23104 | S28044 | S28045 | S29610 |
| 1996 | S29611 | S33187 | S33188 | S36551 |
| 1997 | S36552 | S36908 | S36909 | S38434 |
| 1998 | S38435 | S40173 | S40518 | S40895 |
| 1999 | S40896 | S41922 | S41923 | S42280 |
| 2000 | S42281 | | | |

== See also ==
- Remington XP-100
- Savage Striker
