= 6.5mm Remington Magnum =

US rifle cartridge

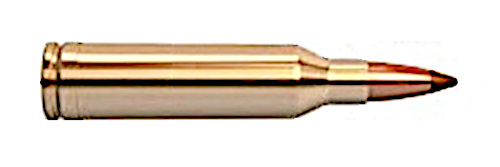
- Type: Rifle
- Place of origin: United States

Production history
- Designer: Remington
- Designed: 1966
- Manufacturer: Remington
- Produced: 1966

Specifications
- Parent case: .350 Remington Magnum
- Case type: Belted bottleneck
- Bullet diameter: .264 in (6.7 mm)
- Neck diameter: .298 in (7.6 mm)
- Shoulder diameter: .495 in (12.6 mm)
- Base diameter: .532 in (13.51 mm)
- Rim diameter: .532 in (13.5 mm)
- Rim thickness: .050 in (1.3 mm)
- Case length: 2.170 in (55.1 mm)
- Overall length: 2.800 in (71.1 mm)
- Case capacity: 68 gr H_{2}O (4.4 cm^{3})
- Primer type: Large rifle
- Maximum pressure: 63,100 psi (435 MPa)
- Maximum CUP: 56,200 CUP

Ballistic performance
Bullet mass/type	Velocity	Energy
120 gr (8 g) PSPCL	3,210 ft/s (980 m/s)	2,745 ft⋅lbf (3,722 J)

The 6.5mm Remington Magnum is a .264 caliber (6.7 mm) belted bottlenecked cartridge introduced in 1966. The cartridge is based on a necked down .350 Remington Magnum which on turn is based on a shortened, necked down, blown out .375 H&H Magnum case. The cartridge was one of the first short magnum cartridges.

== General information ==
The 6.5 mm (.264 caliber) has been extremely popular in Europe and especially in the Scandinavian countries and this trend continues today. The 6.5×52mm Carcano, 6.5×53mmR (.256 Mannlicher), 6.5×54mm Mannlicher-Schönauer, 6.5×55mm Swedish Mauser, 6.5×58mmR Krag–Jørgensen and the 6.5×58mm Portuguese are among these cartridges of originally military European origin. What the 6.5 mm (.264 caliber) bullets offered was excellent sectional density and ballistic coefficients. The Scandinavian countries dominated the Olympics in the Nordic events shooting 6.5 mm center fire cartridges like the 6.5×55mm until 1972 when the centerfire shooting events were dropped. However, in North America the .264 caliber did not make much of a head way in terms of popularity. Beginning in the 1950s several ex-service Norwegian Krag–Jørgensen and Swedish Mauser began trickling into the United States. Winchester had designed the .264 Winchester Magnum but it did not gain much of a following and the rifles were plagued by short barrel lives.

In 1966 Remington introduced the 6.5 Remington Magnum, which was based upon the previous years' .350 Remington Magnum, in the 18.5 inch barrel Model 600 carbine. This was poor choice of rifle by Remington as it was unable to exploit the performance potential of the 6.5mm Remington. While Remington did later chamber the cartridge in the 24 inch Model 700 rifle, the damage was already done to the cartridge's reputation. Damage from which it would never fully recover, and eventually it passed into obsolesce. Attempts have been made to revive the cartridge by Ruger and then again by Remington in 2004 in the Model 673 Guide Rifle but these attempts at revival have been unsuccessful.

The 6.5mm Remington Magnum remains an excellent rifle cartridge with a greater performance potential over all the European 6.5mm cartridges save the 6.5x68mm RWS which is similar to the .264 Winchester Magnum. Furthermore, due to its short stature, it can be chambered in lighter, quicker handling short action rifles. On account of the case capacity of the cartridge a barrel with a minimum length of 24 inches is necessary to realize the potential of the cartridge. With shorter barrels performance level drop dramatically especially when slower burning powders are utilized.

Currently Remington no longer produces ammunition for the cartridge.

== Cartridge specifications ==
The 6.5mm Remington Magnum is based on the .350 Remington Magnum necked down to accept a .264 caliber (6.71 mm) bullet. It was one of the original short, fat magnum cartridges to be put into production. The short, fat cartridge design is known to promote efficient powder burning characteristics.

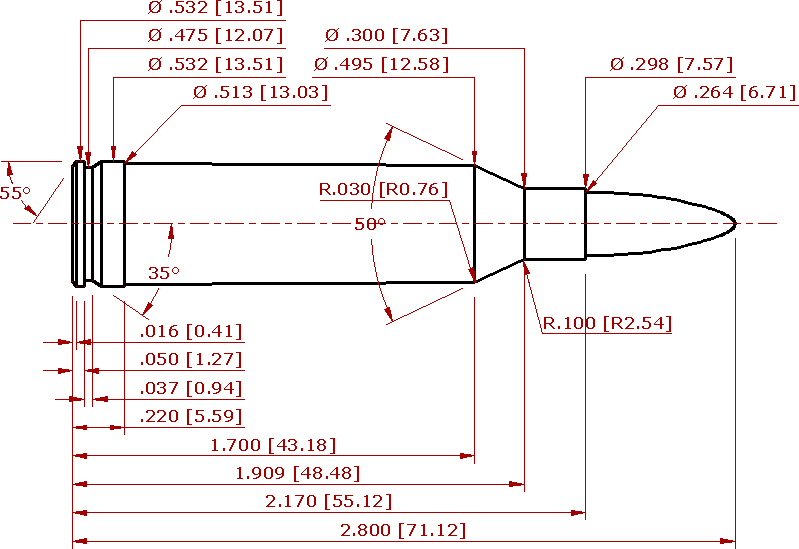

The SAAMI recommends a 6 groove barrel with a 1:9 twist. The bore diameter is given as .256-inch (6.5 mm) and the groove diameter is .264-inch (6.7 mm). The recommended groove width is .095-inch (2.4 mm). SAAMI recommends a maximum pressure of 53,000 C.U.P. while CIP mandates a maximum pressure of no more than 4,350-bar (63,100 psi).

== Performance ==
Remington is the only company that provides ammunition for the cartridge. They provide a single load, the 120-grain (7.8 g) PSP-CL. This Remington factory ammunition with its light for caliber bullet is only recommended for small deer and predator species. Those wishing to take advantage of the versatility of the 6.5mm Remington Magnum have little choice but to handload their ammunition.

Cartridge	Criteria	Muzzle	100 yd (91 m)	200 yd (180 m)	300 yd (270 m)	400 yd (370 m)	500 yd (460 m)
.260 Remington, Remington 140-grain (9.1 g) Premier Core-Lokt	Velocity	2,750 ft/s (840 m/s)	2,554 ft/s (778 m/s)	2,365 ft/s (721 m/s)	2,185 ft/s (666 m/s)	2,013 ft/s (614 m/s)	1,849 ft/s (564 m/s)
.260 Remington, Remington 140-grain (9.1 g) Premier Core-Lokt	Bullet drop	−1.5 in (−3.8 cm)	1.9 in (4.8 cm)	0 in (0 cm)	−8.1 in (−21 cm)	−23.6 in (−60 cm)	−47.6 in (−121 cm)
6.5×55mm Swedish Mauser, Federal 140-grain (9.1 g) SP	Velocity	2,600 ft/s (790 m/s)	2,402 ft/s (732 m/s)	2,212 ft/s (674 m/s)	2,031 ft/s (619 m/s)	1,859 ft/s (567 m/s)	1,698 ft/s (518 m/s)
6.5×55mm Swedish Mauser, Federal 140-grain (9.1 g) SP	Bullet drop	−1.5 in (−3.8 cm)	2.3 in (5.8 cm)	0 in (0 cm)	−9.4 in (−24 cm)	−27.0 in (−69 cm)	−55.2 in (−140 cm)
6.5mm Remington Magnum, Hornady 140-grain (9.1 g) SP Handload	Velocity	2,900 ft/s (880 m/s)	2,700 ft/s (820 m/s)	2,509 ft/s (765 m/s)	2,327 ft/s (709 m/s)	2,153 ft/s (656 m/s)	1,986 ft/s (605 m/s)
6.5mm Remington Magnum, Hornady 140-grain (9.1 g) SP Handload	Bullet drop	−1.5 in (−3.8 cm)	1.6 in (4.1 cm)	0 in (0 cm)	−7.2 in (−18 cm)	−20.8 in (−53 cm)	−41.9 in (−106 cm)
.264 Winchester Magnum, Winchester 140-grain (9.1 g) Super-X PP	Velocity	3,030 ft/s (920 m/s)	2,782 ft/s (848 m/s)	2,547 ft/s (776 m/s)	2,325 ft/s (709 m/s)	2,113 ft/s (644 m/s)	1,913 ft/s (583 m/s)
.264 Winchester Magnum, Winchester 140-grain (9.1 g) Super-X PP	Bullet drop	−1.5 in (−3.8 cm)	1.5 in (3.8 cm)	0 in (0 cm)	−6.8 in (−17 cm)	−20.1 in (−51 cm)	−41.2 in (−105 cm)
All values retrieved from respective websites. 6.5mm Remington Mag. data from Hornady Reloading Manual #4

The 6.5 mm Remington Magnum compares favorably with other 6.5mm (.264 caliber) cartridges. It terms of energy it is bested by the 6.5×68mm RWS and the .264 Winchester Magnum. However, neither the 6.5×68mm RWS nor the .264 Winchester Magnum can be chambered in a short-action rifle. It provides a leap in performance over the non-magnum cartridges such as the .260 Remington and 6.5×55mm Swedish.

== See also ==
- List of rifle cartridges
- Table of handgun and rifle cartridges
