= Van Themsche =

Van Themsche or Vanthemsche is a surname. Notable people with the surname include:

- Frieda Van Themsche (born 1955), Belgian politician
- Hans Van Themsche (born 1988), Belgian spree killer
- Piet Vanthemsche (born 1955), Belgian civil servant
