= Winchester Model 1894 =

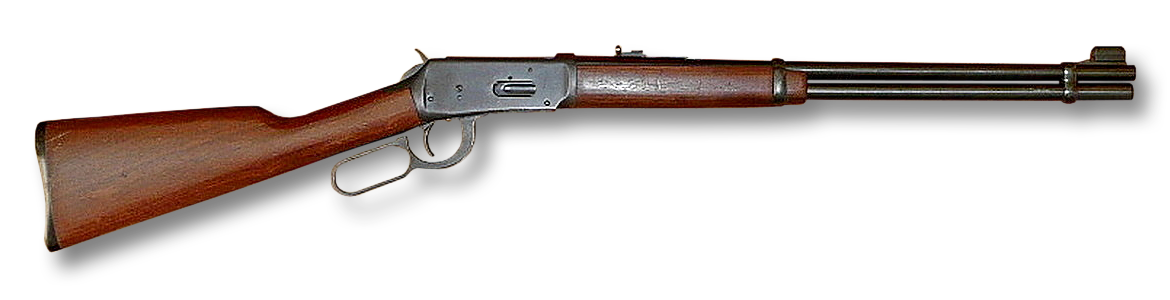
- Type: Lever-action rifle
- Place of origin: United States

Service history
- Used by: United States
- Wars: Indian Wars; Spanish–American War; Mexican Revolution; World War I World War II

Production history
- Designer: John Browning
- Designed: 1894
- Produced: 1894–2006; 2011–present
- No. built: 7,500,000+

Specifications
- Mass: 6.8 lb (3.1 kg)
- Length: 37.8 in (960 mm)
- Barrel length: 20 in (510 mm)
- Cartridge: .38-55 Winchester, .32-40 Winchester, .30-30 Winchester, .25-35 Winchester, .32 Winchester Special, 7-30 Waters, .307 Winchester, .356 Winchester, .375 Winchester, .357 Magnum, .44 Remington Magnum, .444 Marlin, .45 Colt, .450 Marlin, .410 bore
- Action: Lever-action
- Muzzle velocity: 2,490 ft/s (759 m/s)
- Feed system: 9-round (26" barrel), 8-round (24" barrel) or 7-round (20" barrel) internal tube magazine
- Sights: Notch rear sight, post front sight. Peep sights also available.

The Winchester Model 1894 rifle (also known as the Winchester 94 or Model 94) is a lever-action repeating rifle that became one of the most famous and popular hunting rifles of all time. It was designed by John Browning in 1894 and originally chambered in either the .32-40 Winchester or the .38-55 Winchester, two metallic black powder cartridges. It was later the first rifle to chamber the smokeless powder round, the .30 WCF (.30 Winchester Center Fire, in time becoming known as the .30-30 Winchester) in 1895. In 1901, Winchester created the new .32 Winchester Special caliber with production of rifles starting in 1902.

The Model 1894 was produced by the Winchester Repeating Arms Company from 1894 to 1980 and then by U.S. Repeating Arms under the Winchester brand, until they ceased manufacturing rifles in 2006. Reproductions are being made by the Miroku company of Japan and imported into the United States by the Browning Arms company of Morgan, Utah. The Model 1894 has been referred to as the "ultimate lever-action design" by firearms historians such as R. L. Wilson and Hal Herring. The Model 1894 is the rifle credited with the name "Winchester" being used to refer to all rifles of this type and was the first commercial sporting rifle to sell over 7,000,000 units.

One Model 1894 is on display at the Metropolitan Museum of Art in the Arms & Armor department.

== Overview ==
The Winchester Model 1894 was the first commercial American repeating rifle built to be used with smokeless powder. The 1894 was originally chambered to fire 2 metallic black powder cartridges, the .32-40 Winchester and .38-55 Winchester. In 1895 Winchester went to a different steel composition for rifle manufacturing that could handle higher pressure rounds and offered the rifle in .25-35 Winchester and .30-30 Winchester. The .30-30 Winchester, or .30 WCF (Winchester Centerfire), is the cartridge that has become synonymous with the Model 1894. Starting in 1899, the Model 1894 was also chambered in .32 Winchester Special.

The Model 94's combination of potent firepower in a compact, lightweight, comfortable-to-carry, and quick-shooting package has made it an extremely popular hunting rifle, particularly for white-tailed deer in the dense forests of the Eastern United States, where most game is killed at relatively short distances. As a result, it was the first sporting rifle to sell over 7,000,000 units. The millionth Model 1894 was given to President Calvin Coolidge in 1927, the 1½ millionth rifle to President Harry S. Truman on May 8, 1948 and the two millionth unit was given to President Dwight D. Eisenhower in 1953.

The United States government purchased 1,800 commercial Model 1894s with 50,000 .30-30 Winchester cartridges during World War I. These rifles in the 835800 to 852500 serial number range were marked atop the receiver ring with a flaming bomb and "U.S." The rifles were intended for United States Army Signal Corps personnel stationed in the Pacific Northwest to prevent labor strike actions from interrupting manufacture of Sitka spruce lumber for framing the fuselage and wings of military aircraft. The rifles were sold as military surplus after the war. To release Lee–Enfield rifles for infantry use, the Royal Navy purchased approximately 5,000 .30-30 caliber Model 94 rifles in 1914 for shipboard guard duty and mine-clearing. France purchased 15,100 Model 1894 carbines equipped with sling swivels on the left side of the buttstock and barrel band, and with metric gradations on the No. 44A rear sight. These French carbines were issued to motorcycle couriers, artillery troops, trench railway personnel, and some balloon units. Some of these rifles acquired Belgian proofmarks when sold as surplus through Belgium. Examples captured from the United Kingdom by the Wehrmacht were designated the Gewehr 248(e).

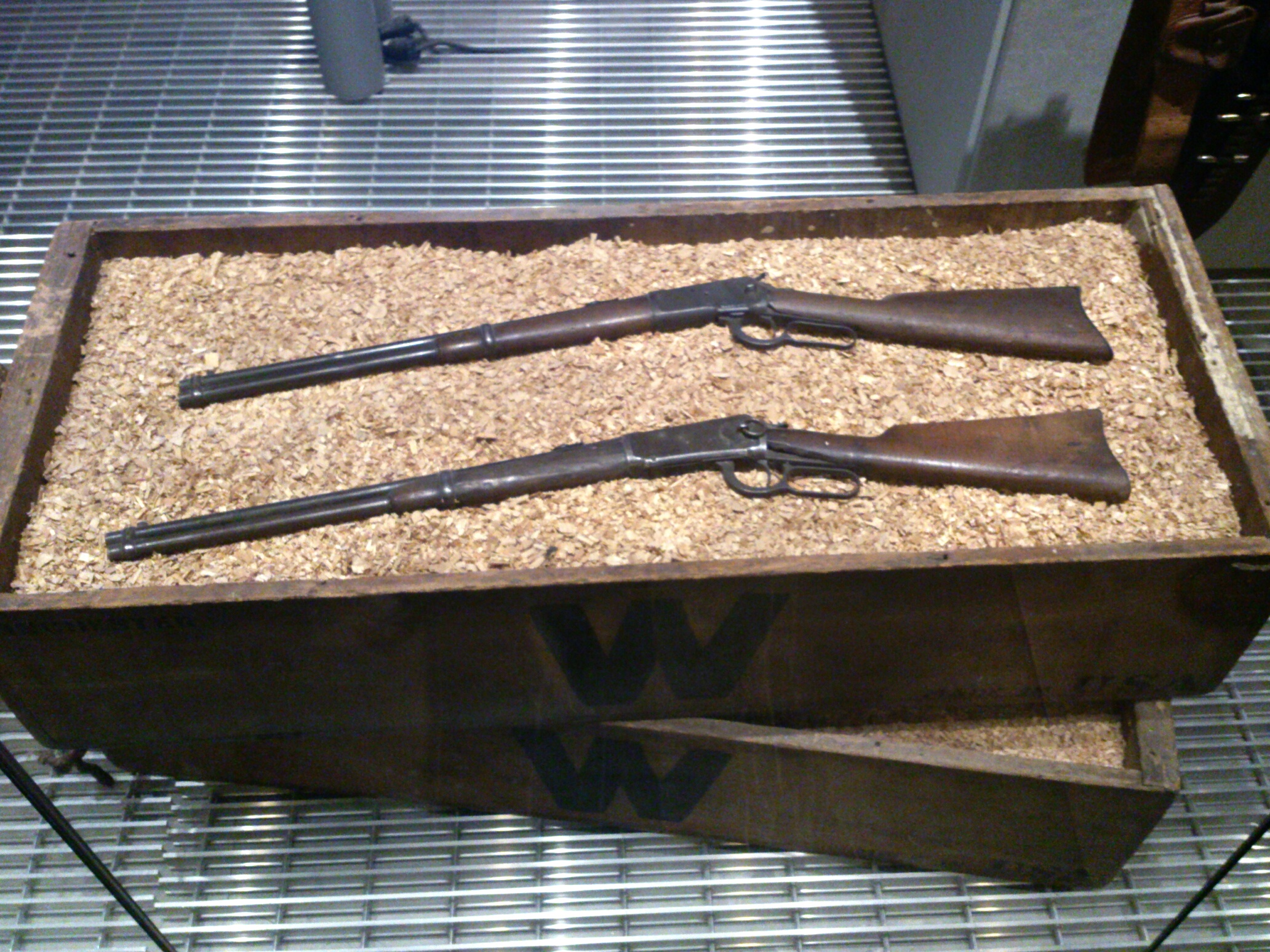
Winchester rifle models as used in the Mexican Revolution

The Winchester 1894 was used again in World War II in the hands of the Canadian Pacific Coast Militia Rangers who were issued them to defend the west coast of Canada from Japanese invaders. Winchester '94s were also provided to the British Home Guard in the early years of WWII.

The Model 94 over its long history included the Winchester Model 55, produced from 1924 through 1932 in a 24-inch (610 mm) barrel, and the Winchester Model 64, produced from 1933 through 1957 in 20, 24, and 26-inch (660 mm) barrel lengths. From 1964 through 1980, a version of the Model 94 carbine was also sold by Sears as the Ted Williams Model 100, as part of Sears' marketing arrangement with both Winchester and the retired baseball star. Ted Williams signature was roll marked on the barrel of the Model 100.

In mid-1964, the manufacturing of the 94 was changed in order to make the firearm less expensive to produce. Those made prior to 1964 are referred to as the "pre-64" models, and these earlier versions command a premium price over post-change rifles. The limited number of early-1964 production models produced prior to the changeover are considered quite desirable, as they are considered by many to represent the ending of an era.

The Winchester 1894's design allowed the cycling of longer cartridges, than the Winchester 1892 rifles and carbines could permit. When the lever is pulled down, it brings the bottom of the receiver with it, opening up more space and allowing a longer cartridge to feed without making the receiver longer. The mechanism is complex but very reliable. Complete stripping of the action is a multistage task that must be accomplished in precise sequence. However, it is rarely necessary to completely strip the action. The largest cartridge that the 1894 action can accommodate is the .450 Marlin, which was chambered in some custom rifles and the short-lived Timber Carbine on a beefed-up 1894 "big bore" receiver.

Decades after the Winchester 1892 was phased out of production, the Winchester 1894 Models were manufactured in typical revolver calibers such as .38 Special/.357 Magnum, .44 Special/.44 Magnum, .45 Colt, .38-40 Winchester, and .44-40 Winchester. Typically, the tubular magazine is able to hold 9 to 13 rounds of these handgun calibers. The magazine capacity depends on the length of the barrel, as the under barrel tubular magazine typically covers the entire length of the barrel.

Handgun calibers are preferred by modern-day Cowboy Action Shooters as it allows one type of ammunition for both rifle and handgun. A typical combination would be an 1873 Colt (Colt Peacemaker or clone) and a Winchester 1894 capable of shooting the same type of ammunition. The 1894 action, designed for smokeless rifle rounds, is much stronger than the action of the Winchesters (Models 1866, 1873, 1876) that were based on Benjamin Henry's toggle-link system, and can easily handle modern high-pressure revolver cartridges such as the .44 Magnum.

From 1984 to 1997, the Model 94 angle eject 20" barreled carbine and 24" barreled XTR rifle were offered in 7-30 Waters (an improved .30-30 case necked down to a 7mm bullet). In 2003, the rifle was offered in .410 shotgun and named the Model 9410.

As of 1983, the Winchester 1894 holds the record for best-selling high-powered rifle in U.S. history.

In 2003, the Utah Department of Corrections purchased multiple .30-caliber Model 94s for usage in firing squad executions. They were planned to be used in two upcoming executions that June, although they were later delayed. They were first used in the Utah execution of Ronnie Lee Gardner in 2010, who remains the most recent inmate to be executed by firing squad in the state of Utah, and was the most recent in the United States until Brad Sigmon in 2025.

U.S. production ceased in 2006. At the time there were 14 versions of the Model 94 in the Winchester catalog. In 2010 Winchester Repeating Arms reintroduced the model 94 in two Limited Edition models to commemorate the 200th anniversary of Oliver F. Winchester's birth in New England in 1810.

== Design changes ==
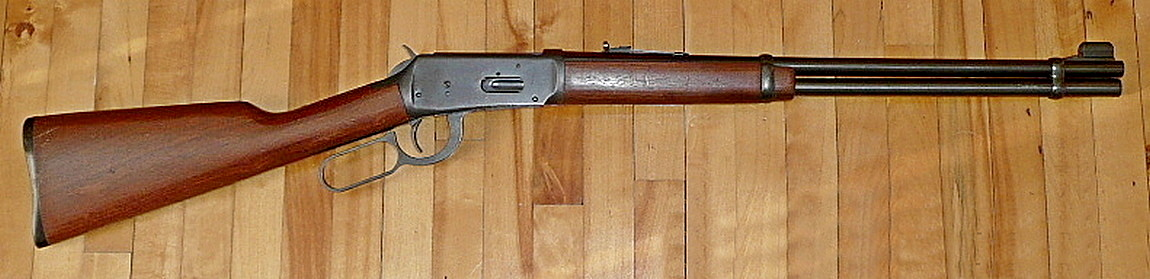
Winchester 94 (1966) .32 Winchester Special

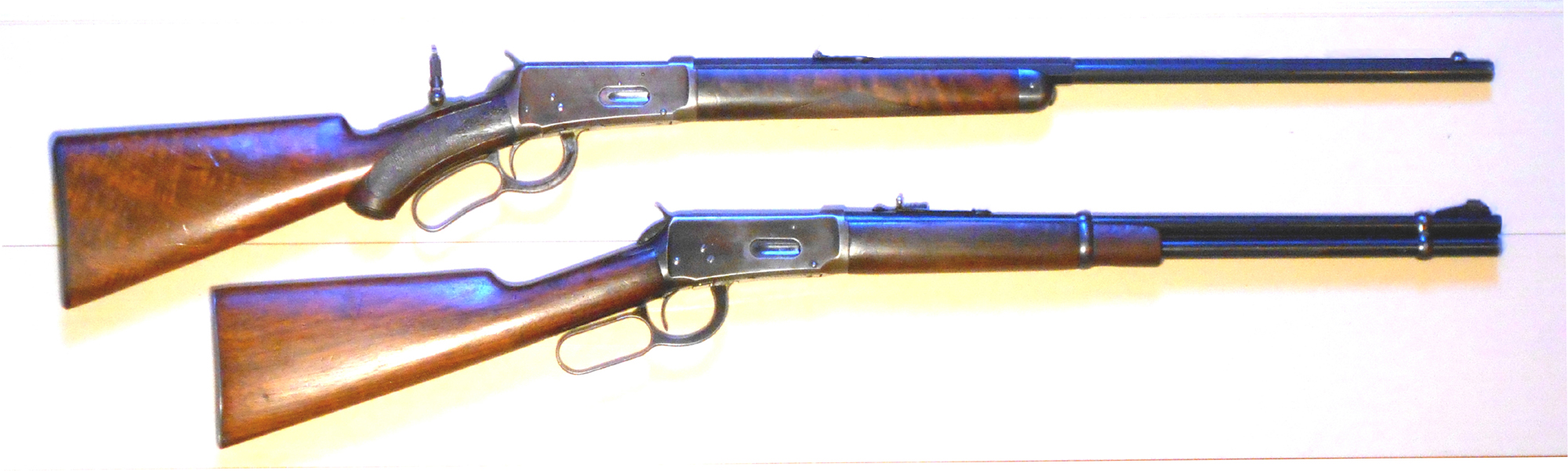
Winchester 94 variants.

Three major changes have been made in the design and construction of the Winchester 1894 since World War II. All of these major changes are tied to Winchester's corporate leadership and direction. The first and largest came in 1964, after the 1963 resignation of gun enthusiast John M. Olin from the presidency of the company he founded, Olin Corporation. The second came in 1982, after Olin's 1981 sale of the Winchester factory to its employees, who formed the U.S. Repeating Arms Company (USRAC). The third came in 1992, after the 1989 bankruptcy of USRAC and its subsequent purchase by FN Herstal, which sought to market Winchester firearms worldwide.

=== 1964 ===
Upon Olin's retirement, Olin Corporation's new chief executives sought to maximize company profitability, giving corporate preference to its flourishing chemical business over gun production, which was unprofitable and labor-intensive. As a result, Winchester ceased machining both the receiver and many small parts of the Model 94 out of solid steel billet as of 1964. Sintered steel was used on the receiver, stamped sheet metal for the cartridge lifter, and hollow rather than solid steel roll pins used in the action. While the rifle's function, safety, and accuracy were not adversely affected, the changes—in particular the sintered receiver, which was as strong as its solid-steel predecessor but which did not respond well to a traditional blued finish—were conspicuous and came as Winchester made even more fundamental changes to its flagship Model 70 bolt-action rifle. Taken together, they were seen as a retreat from quality production across the company's whole range, seriously damaging Winchester's reputation for making quality firearms in the process. In response, many sought out rifles made before 1964 (popularly referred to as "pre-'64" rifles), which command a markedly higher resale value on the gun market to this day.

=== 1982 ===
One of the drawbacks of the original Model 1894 action in relation to competitors like the Marlin Model 336 was that the Winchester ejects cartridges from the top of the receiver and over the user's shoulder, rather than to the side. A top-ejecting firearm cannot mount a telescopic scope on top of the receiver—the most convenient location for the shooter—without interfering with cartridge ejection. A scope for such a firearm must instead be mounted either far forward on the barrel (where it must be specifically designed for the purpose), or offset to the side of the gun (which creates problems due to parallax). Both options seriously degrade the usefulness of a scope for such a rifle.

This was not a major concern when the gun was originally designed; the most common upgrade to guns of the pre–World War II era was the installation of a peep sight to the rear of the receiver, which maximized the accuracy potential of the factory-installed iron sights. Winchester had long had mounting holes pre-drilled in the receiver of the gun to accommodate such a modification, and it was by far the most common upgrade installed on the Model 1894 for most of its history. Nevertheless, consumer tastes changed in the years after World War II as high quality scopes became both widely available and affordable. Commercial acceptance of the new scopes was likewise rapid, and by the 1970s the ability to use receiver-mounted scopes on hunting rifles had become expected by most gun buyers. With the competition able to mount scopes on its receivers without difficulty, this shortcoming was blamed for falling sales. In response, Winchester changed the design of the action in 1982 to angled cartridge ejection, which ejects fired cartridges at an angle that allows the rifle to function while fitted with a conventional receiver-mounted scope.

=== 1992 ===
Despite these changes, U.S. Repeating Arms did not flourish, declaring bankruptcy in 1989. It was subsequently purchased by Belgian arms maker FN Herstal, which set about improving the whole Winchester line, instituting modern CNC methods of production at Winchester's factory while also seeking to expand the sales and marketing of Winchester rifles worldwide. This effort would culminate in two major changes to the gun in 1992: the reintroducing of now-CNC-machined parts and solid pins back into the action, and the elimination of the traditional half-cock safety notch on the hammer in favor of a cross-bolt safety, which enabled the gun to be sold internationally.

Though the increase in build quality was noted at the time, it was the conspicuous presence of the new safety that generated the strongest opinions. It was widely reviled by American consumers and gun writers alike as a "lawyer" safety, who said it detracted from the overall look, feel, and operation of the rifle. FNH and Winchester responded in 2003 by moving the safety to the tang behind the receiver, which largely quelled the controversy. Both the last Model 1894s to leave the New Haven factory before American production ceased in 2006 and the new Model 1894s produced in Japan since 2010 by Miroku Corp. feature these tang-mounted safeties. Current production includes a Carbine, Deluxe Sporting, Short Rifle, Sporter, and Trails End Takedown models.

== See also ==
- Colt Lightning Carbine
- Table of handgun and rifle cartridges
- Winchester rifle
