= 2006 Antwerp shooting =

Belgian fatal shooting

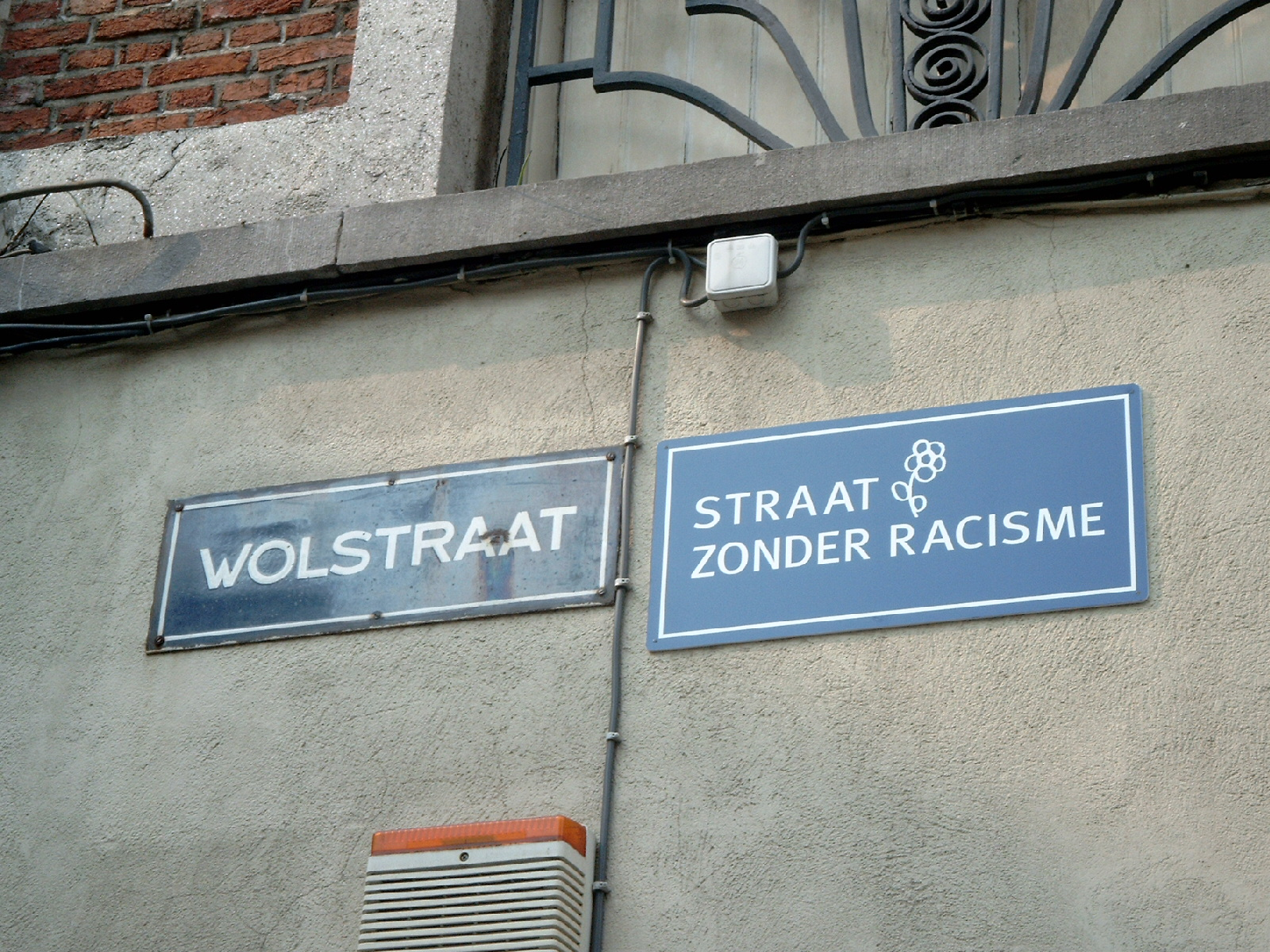
- Location: 51°13′23″N 4°24′15″E; Antwerp, Belgium
- Date: May 11, 2006; 20 years ago
- Target: People of Non-Belgian Origin
- Attack type: mass shooting,double murder,hate crime
- Weapon: Marlin 336W .30-30 Winchester Rifle
- Deaths: 2
- Injuries: 1
- Perpetrator: Hans Van Themsche
- Motive: Racism
- Convictions: Murder (2 counts); Attempted Murder; Aggravating Circumstance of Racism

On 11 May 2006, a shooting occurred in the city centre of Antwerp. The gunman, 18-year-old student Hans Van Themsche, killed two people and severely wounded another, before being shot and incapacitated by a police officer. Van Themsche (born 7 February 1988, in Wilrijk, Antwerp, Flemish Region of Belgium) was sentenced to life imprisonment in 2008.

The homicide received widespread media attention and drew major public and political attention to responsibilities regarding political presentation of immigrant and racial issues and its possible effects on individuals.

== Course of events ==
Van Themsche had been caught smoking at his boarding school on 9 May 2006, and was facing likely expulsion.

He travelled from Roeselare to Antwerp where, on the morning of the eleventh, he had his long hair cut and shaven off (apart from a ponytail) before legally purchasing a Marlin 336W hunting rifle in .30-30 Winchester and ammunition from a local weapons merchant. About ten minutes before noon, dressed in a Gothic fashion, he began his rampage in the city centre with a shot in the breast of a woman of Turkish descent who was seated six metres away on a bench reading a book; Songul Koç was severely wounded. He chambered another round and passed a pregnant Malian nanny, Oulemata Niangadou, and her two-year-old European charge, Luna Drowart. He turned and shot each of them in the back at close range, killing both instantly. While he moved on (presumably looking for more victims) Van Themsche was intercepted by a passing police officer, who held him at gunpoint and ordered him to surrender the rifle. After Van Themsche's refusal to put his weapon down and upon a suspicious movement, the officer fired once, neutralizing him with a shot to the stomach. Later on, Van Themsche's father would comment: "In my eyes, the policeman who shot down my son is a hero. I'm glad the man had so much courage, or else even more victims would have fallen."

Van Themsche, while being treated in hospital, described himself as a skinhead and admitted to police – as he had before the murders to boarding school friends – to specifically targeting non-whites. Of the 2-year-old (white) child, Van Themsche said she was "in the wrong place at the wrong time". Her death, however, was not incidental, since he had to chamber a new round before each shot. He told his interrogators "the presence near a black was sufficient reason" to kill the toddler. According to his statement, his reason for targeting minorities was that youths of foreign descent used to bully him at school; that would have been at least three years earlier. A farewell letter found in his room – as he may not have expected to survive – did not declare the premeditated murderous intent to which he confessed but did reveal that he wanted to take action against self-perceived "chaos in society".

At trial, the defense lawyers argued that Van Themsche suffered from Asperger syndrome and narcissistic personality disorder and was therefore insane. On 11 October, a jury of 12 citizens found Van Themsche guilty on all charges pressed against him, including the murder of Oulemata Niangadou and Luna Drowart. They also judged that the murders were motivated by racism. The next day, the jury and the three professional judges of the court of assizes sentenced him to life imprisonment. The Court of Cassation rejected Van Themsche's appeal in February 2008. By June 2009, civil lawsuits at Antwerp had recognized a total of nearly 325,000 euro for damages to victims' families and Songul Koç whom he had caused a permanent professional disability of 55 percent; further treatment costs would add to his dues.

== Early declarations ==
The King and the Prime Minister reacted within hours: Albert II sent a message to the victims' families; the Royal Palace press service explicitly reminded on the King's well-known perspective on racism and violence to have been illuminated in his January speech before the several Institutions of the country. Guy Verhofstadt was quoted as saying: "These horrific, cowardly murders are a form of extreme racism. It should be clear to everyone now where extreme right can lead to." The president of the European Parliament, Josep Borrell, noted that the succession of attacks "shows that the step from xenophobic talk to crime is, unfortunately, possible".

== Murderer's background and alleged responsibility of Vlaams Belang and its voters ==
Though the Antwerp public prosecutors said "on first investigation of his environment and family [Hans] seems not to be brought up in a racialist or violent setting" and the family became described as "well-behaved" and as having an "impeccable Flemish-nationalist pedigree" — the fact that the gunman's aunt, Frieda Van Themsche, was a member of parliament for the large far-right party with anti-immigrant rhetoric Vlaams Belang, immediately brought press attention to the murderer's family background. In World War II, the twin brothers Van Themsche voluntarily fought on the side of their country's occupier, Nazi Germany, in Waffen SS uniform against the Soviets on the Eastern Front, costing one brother's life and Hans' grandfather Karel a leg; in the sixties he joined the Volksunie, in 1978 following Karel Dillen into its hard-right split-off Vlaams Blok. Also his children Frieda and Peter, who would about ten years later father Hans, were earliest day members and became militants.

On 12 April, Vlaams Belang MP Alexandra Colen's husband Paul Beliën, named a Vlaams Belang ideologist and a publicist, reportedly had called upon the Flemish people to get rid of people of Arab origin in a pamphlet titled "Give us weapons". That title referred to a 1963 –then obviously figurative– outcry reportedly ascribed to the later Prime Minister Martens that was related to disputes between Belgian speakers of Dutch and of French. Beliën withdrew his text upon an official complaint by the Centre for Equal Opportunities and Fight against Racism (CEOFR or CGKR).

Public debate targeted the Vlaams Belang party with claims that it was partly morally responsible for the murderous shooting at Antwerp. In addition to their decade-long calls for a tighter immigration policy – including in its previous incarnation as the Vlaams Blok, the removal of Belgian citizens of foreign ethnicity – this party is in favour of armed self-defence; except for its principle public figure, Filip Dewinter, who has specifically distanced himself from this notion in the aftermath of this murder spree. One month before the latter on the other hand, he had published: "We've had enough of serving as autochthonous chased game. Instead of going through life as scaredy-hares, we should rather become foresters." The used Dutch term for a scaredy-cat refers to the often hunted animal, for a forester to a patrol officer often against poachers and then typically armed with a shotgun (and possibly the less easily perceived 9 mm semiautomatic handgun).

Carl Devos, a left-wing political scientist at Ghent University, reportedly stated: "It's intellectually unfair to blame the act of a lunatic on a political party, whatever his family ties to the Vlaams Belang, but the VB is responsible for creating an atmosphere and popularizing the theme of racial tension."

In a press release on 12 May, the Belgian Movement against Racism, Anti-Semitism, and Xenophobia (MRAX) stated: "This violence does not come from nowhere. It is the result of years of ambiguous or openly racist discourse, which aims to make 'foreigners' responsible for individual frustrations and social misery" and questioned Belgium's continued public financing of political parties such as Vlaams Belang, which, according to MRAX, encouraged the stigmatization of ethnic minorities in Belgium. Four days later the European Network Against Racism cited that press release and added "Europe must act to address the reality of racism in its societies".

Four days after the murder, Flanders' main commercial TV station VTM conducted a poll among 700 Flemings concerning the political consequences of the murders:

- Is Vlaams Belang morally responsible for the murders? 24% yes, 46% no, 30% unsure
- Will Vlaams Belang suffer in the next election? 37% yes, 34% no, 28% unsure
- Should government funding to Vlaams Belang be cut? 30% yes, 50% no, 20% unsure

On 18 May, the political parties Socialist Party - Different, Spirit, Socialist Party, Reformist Movement and Humanist Democratic Centre filed a complaint against Vlaams Belang with the Belgian Council of State, attempting to decrease the party's state funding (dotation).

The family of Luna denounced a letter of sympathy from Vlaams Belang, and asked to be left in peace until after the funeral. The African nanny was buried in Mali, repatriated at the expense of the city of Antwerp. After Luna's funeral, her parents' advocate asked Vlaams Belang to withdraw a campaign banner that displays a little blond girl, reminding them too much of their daughter, "additionally because the child's killer comes precisely from that environment." A spokesman for Vlaams Belang responded that the party already at its Monday management meeting had decided to remove the banner.

A week after the killings, the polling site De Stemmenkampioen asked its panel: "Is there a connection between the murders committed by Hans Van Themsche and Vlaams Belang?", with response 36% yes, 59% no, 5% unsure.

On 19 May on Canvas TV, foreign minister Karel De Gucht held "not only the extreme right Vlaams Belang party" but "also the voters of this party" responsible "for the climate of racism" in which the murders took place.

== Aftermath ==
Mayor Patrick Janssens and several hundred locals followed the family of Oulemata Niangadou and representatives of African and Turkish organisations in a silent march towards the spots of the shootings on the morning thereafter. Amongst speeches held, the president of the city's Council for the Policy regarding Ethnical and Cultural Minorities, Georges Kamanayo, accused "the leaders of extreme right parties" of moral complicity.

An impromptu peaceful protest against Vlaams Belang organized on 15 May at Brussels held the traditional minute of silence for Van Themsche's victims.

During the night of 16–17 May 2006, a Molotov cocktail was thrown into the head office of the Flemish nationalist youth organisation Vlaams Nationaal Jeugdverbond (VNJ) in Berchem that has links to the Vlaams Belang. A Turkish courier was able to quickly extinguish the fire, crucially, as the apartment above the office was inhabited (as it turned out, by the mother of New Flemish Alliance (N-VA) president Bart De Wever).

In the wake of the murders, the government tried to take action against Flemish entries on websites where it judged hate and racism to be spread, such as Stormfront. This proved difficult, because the sites are American and protected by the First Amendment.

The case expedited a law that halted the possibility of buying lethal firearms of all kind on impulse and making the licensing almost strictest in the world.

In July 2007, a municipal decree came in effect that forbids the display of weapons in Antwerp shop windows. The Governor of the Province rejected the appeal filed by arms dealer Lang, who had sold Van Themsche the murder weapon.

On 10 May 2008, the Standaard Uitgeverij published justice reporter Gust Verwerft's book De Zaak Hans Van Themsche (The Case of Hans Van Themsche) (ISBN 9789002223617).
