= Marlin Model 336 =

Type of lever-action rifle and carbine

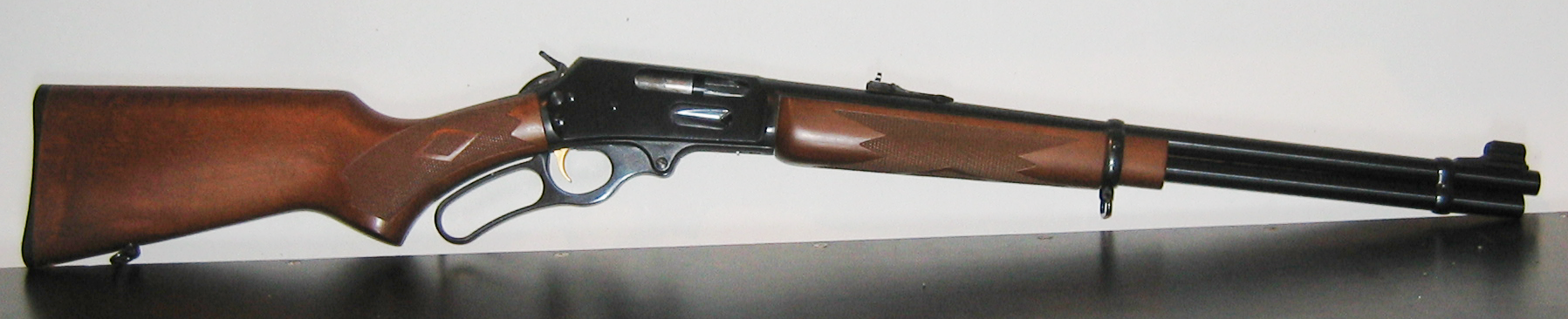
- Marlin 336W in .30-30 Winchester
- Type: Lever-action rifle
- Place of origin: United States

Production history
- Designer: L.L. Hepburn, T.R. Robinson Jr.
- Designed: 1948
- Manufacturer: Marlin Firearms
- Produced: 1948–present
- No. built: 4,000,000+

Specifications
- Mass: 7 lb (3.2 kg) - 8 lb (3.6 kg)
- Length: 38.5 in (98 cm) - 42.5 in (108 cm)
- Barrel length: 20 in (510 mm) - 24 in (610 mm)
- Cartridge: Current offerings: (May, 2024).30-30 Winchester; No longer offered: (Oct. 01, 2022).219 Zipper, .307 Winchester, .35 Remington, .32-40 WCF, .32 Special, .338 Marlin Express, .356 Winchester, .375 Winchester, .38-55 Winchester, .44 Magnum, .410 bore Model 1895 Chamberings:.45-70, .444 Marlin, .450 Marlin
- Action: Lever-action
- Effective firing range: 100 yd (91 m) - 300 yd (270 m)
- Feed system: Tubular magazine with 6+1 cartridges (capacity varies depending on the model)
- Sights: Iron sights, optional telescopic, integral 1913 rail on some models

The Marlin Model 336 is a lever-action rifle and carbine made by Marlin Firearms. Since its introduction in 1948, it has been offered in a number of different calibers and barrel lengths, but is commonly chambered in .30-30 Winchester or .35 Remington, using a 20- or 24-inch barrel. Currently, several models with a 16-, 19- and 20-inch barrels are available in .30-30 Winchester. The Model 336 is now back in production as of March 27, 2023.

== History ==
The Model 336 is a direct development of the Marlin Model 1893 rifle, which was produced from 1893 to 1936. Based on the patents of L.L. Hepburn, (Note: Mainly patent US502489A) the Model 1893 incorporated a new locking bolt system and a two-piece firing pin. (Note: This system was known as the "Hepburn action".) In 1936, with only minor changes to the stock, forearm, and sights, the Model 1893 was redesignated the Model 1936 (soon renamed the Model 36). All of these firearms featured a solid-top receiver made of forged steel and incorporated side ejection of fired cartridges. Compared to the Winchester 94, then the predominant lever-action hunting rifle, the Model 36 was somewhat heavier with a simpler internal mechanism and a full pistol grip-type buttstock in contrast to the Winchester 94's straight-grip stock.

In 1948, the Model 36 was replaced by the Model 336, which incorporated the patents of Thomas R. Robinson, Jr., a Marlin employee. Sold under both the Marlin and Glenfield brands, the Model 336 has been in continuous production from 1948 to the present day, and is currently produced by Ruger Firearms under the Marlin brand.

While most current variants of the Model 336 feature a full pistol-grip walnut stock, 20-inch barrel and full-length tube magazine, other versions of the 336 have been frequently offered by Marlin over the years, including barrel lengths of 16.25-inch, 18-inch, 22-inch, and 24-inch barrels; half-length magazines; straight-grip stocks; and hardwood furniture.

== Design ==
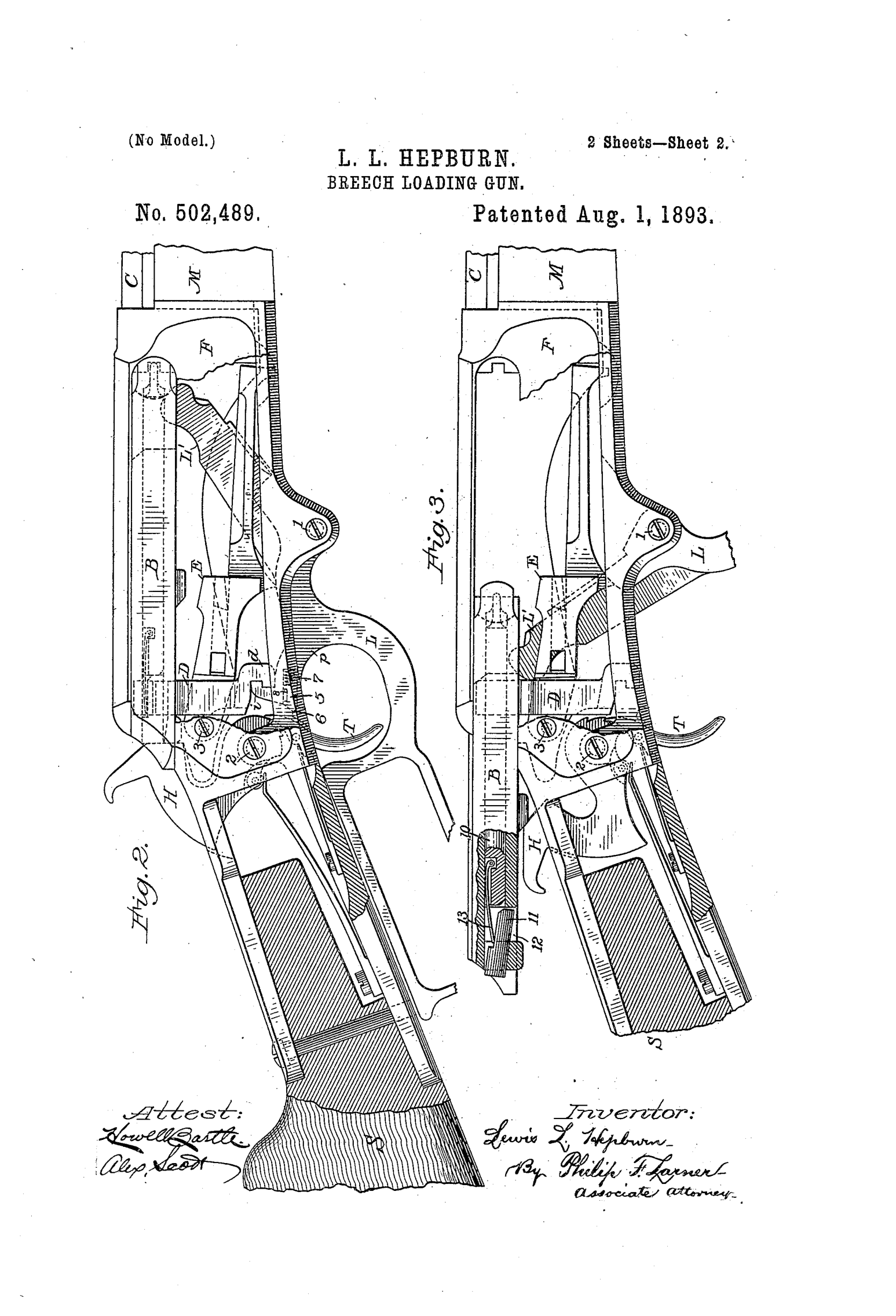
Loading mechanism for the Hepburn breech-loading gun used in the Marlin M336. Video demonstration:3D Animation of mechanism in action

An evolution of the Model 36 rifle, the Model 336 is easily distinguished from its predecessors by its open ejection port machined into the side of the receiver. Design improvements include a stronger and simpler round-profile chrome-plated breech bolt, a redesigned cartridge carrier, an improved extractor, and coil-type main and trigger springs in place of the flat springs used in earlier Marlin rifles. Like its predecessors, the receiver and all major working parts of the Model 336 are constructed of steel forgings.

With its solid, flat-top receiver and side ejection of fired cartridges, the Marlin 336 is prime candidate for use with a rifle scope. In 1956, Marlin also incorporated its proprietary Micro-Groove rifling system into the Model 336 and other centerfire Marlin rifles. This rifling system, which used an increased number of relatively shallow rifling grooves, cut down production time and significantly extended the service life of machine tooling. According to Marlin, the Micro-Groove system provides very uniform bore dimensions and a very smooth bore finish designed to improve accuracy, prevent gas leakage, and reduce bore fouling.

The Model 336 is designed to be easily disassembled for cleaning. Removal of the lever pivot screw with a flathead screwdriver, allows field stripping of the lever arm, bolt, and ejector for maintenance. Unlike many lever-action designs, the Model 336 can be cleaned from the breech, much like a bolt-action rifle. This in turn avoids damage to the muzzle caused by cleaning rods and tools.

== Production ==
As of 1983, the Model 336 was ranked the #2 all-time leader in U.S. high-powered sporting rifle sales, after the Winchester Model 1894, with over 3.5 million sold.

Ruger began manufacturing Marlins after buying rights to the design from Remington. New production of the 336 was announced in a news release that began on March 27, 2023.

== Other models based on the Model S336 action ==
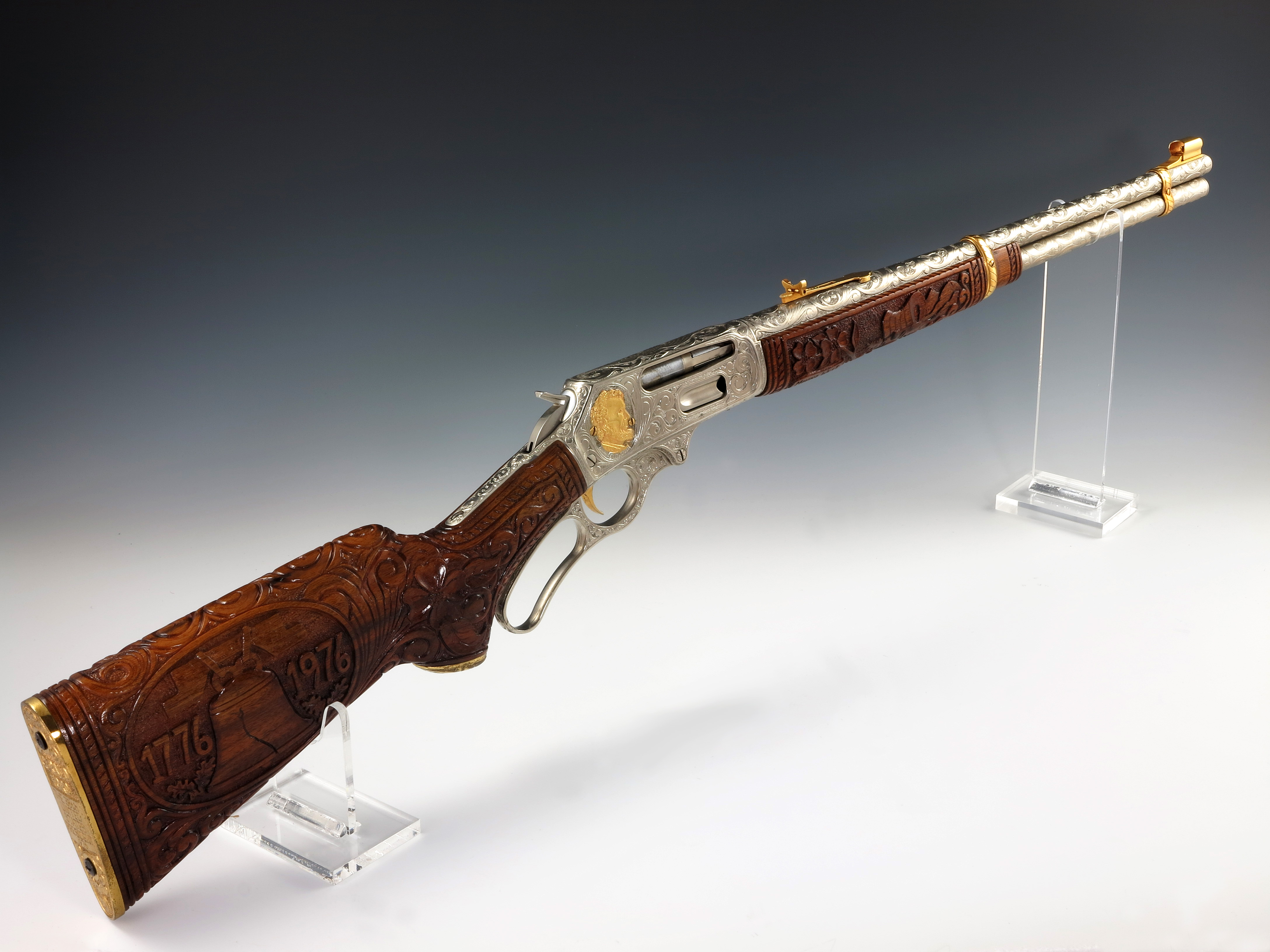
This 30-30 Cal. Marlin rifle is engraved with scenes from American history commemorating America’s Bicentennial.

Marauder, Trapper, and Model 336Y

Marlin has made short carbine versions of the Model 336 over the years, including the Model 336 Marauder, Trapper and the Model 336Y (Y standing for "Youth Model"). Usually featuring a short 16- or 18-inch barrel, these carbines are considerably shorter and lighter than the standard 20" carbine. The Model 336Y also featured a short buttstock to enable use by younger shooters.

The Glenfield

For many years, Marlin produced a less-expensive Glenfield line of Model 336 rifles for retail at mass merchandise and department stores including: J.C. Penney, Sears Roebuck & Company, Western Auto, K-Mart and Wal-Mart. Marlin sold these rifles as the Glenfield Models 30, 30A, 30AS or 30AW. Other Model 336 production rifles were stamped with names chosen by the retailer, such as the J.C. Higgins (Sears) Model 45 and Model 50, the Montgomery Ward Western Field Model 740-A EMN, the J.C. Penney Foremost Model 3040, the K-Mart Model 30TK and the Model 3000 for Big 5 Sporting Goods. Mechanically identical to the Model 336, these mass market rifles were typically fitted with lower-cost hardwood (birch) stocks and forearms, and some metal finishing operations were eliminated in the interest of lowering unit cost. By marketing a less-expensive version of the same rifle under a different name to mass merchandising stores, Marlin protected its customer base of small specialty gun dealers.

Store brand models

By 1983, most of Marlin's mass merchandise retailers were in a position to insist on name-brand firearms, and the Glenfield line was dropped. However, Marlin continued to offer a less expensive version of the Model 336, variously called the Model 336W or Model 30AW, originally sold only to the Wal-Mart chain. Fitted with a hardwood stock and lower-cost sights, these rifles were frequently offered as part of a special package with an inexpensive rifle scope, sling, or other options. The Marlin Model 30AW package included a 3-9x32 factory-mounted scope and padded sling, but was otherwise identical to the Marlin Model 336W.

XLR series

Marlin also offers an XLR line of rifles in several calibers, all based on the Model 336 lever-action design. The Model 336XLR features stainless construction, a 24-inch barrel, and a grey/black wood laminate stock.

Model 336SS

The Model 336M, a Model 336 carbine made largely of stainless steel, was introduced in 2000. It was replaced a year later by the Model 336SS, a 20-inch carbine offered only in .30-30 caliber. The Model 336SS was in production until 2020, and featured a forged stainless steel receiver, barrel, bolt, lever, and trigger. The magazine tube, springs, and loading gate are also fabricated from stainless, while other metal parts are nickel-plated steel.

=== Model 375 ===
Introduced in 1980, the Model 375 uses the Model 336 lever-action mechanism but was chambered in the then new .375 Winchester cartridge. This model was discontinued in 1984 after around 16,000 were produced.

=== Model 336ER ===
Introduced in 1984 this model was very similar in appearance to the Model 375 with the addition of the cross-bolt safety. This model was originally to be chambered in both the .307 Winchester and .356 Winchester. The 307 Winchester was never manufactured, having only a few prototypes being made. The 356 Winchester was manufactured from 1984 to 1986, with only 2,441 of these rifles were ever produced and are considered a highly sought-after collector's piece.

=== Model 444 ===
Introduced in 1965, the Model 444 Marlin uses the Model 336 lever-action mechanism, including the signature open ejection port machined into the side of the receiver, but is chambered for the .444 Marlin cartridge. At its introduction, the Model 444 was the most powerful lever-action rifle on the market. With a muzzle energy of more than 3000 ft-lb, the Model 444 was intended for the largest North American game animals. The Model 444 holds 4 cartridges in the magazine and one in the chamber, and was originally fitted with a 24-inch barrel and a straight-grip buttstock.

Early Model 444 rifles utilized a 1-in-38" rifling twist and were handicapped by a lack of suitable bullet weights. In addition, nearly all existing bullets for the .444 had been originally designed solely for use in handguns; used in the Model 444, the bullets tended to break up at higher rifle velocities. A new 265-grain bullet greatly improved the utility of the Model 444 as a hunting rifle, and other bullet weights have since been introduced. In 1971, Model 444's barrel length was reduced to 22 inches, and the rifle's buttstock was changed to a full pistol-grip design. Later production rifles received a change in barrel twist to 1 in 20 inches to stabilize longer and heavier bullets.

=== Model 1895 ===
Introduced in 1972 and named in honor of the Marlin Model of 1895 (produced from 1895–1917), the current (New) Model 1895 rifle offered in .45-70 caliber utilizes the same Model 336 receiver design and lever-action mechanism used in the Marlin Model 444. A variant of the New Model 1895, called the 338MX and 338MXLR, has also become available in more recent times .338 Marlin Express.

==== .450 Marlin ====
The .45-70 was originally a black powder cartridge and most factory ammo is loaded moderately for safety in older rifles, including the original Model of 1895. With increasing numbers of modern .45-70 rifles built with high strength actions (including the current Model 1895, the Ruger No. 1 single shot, the Browning BLR, and the Siamese Mauser conversions), handloaders and specialty ammunition makers like Hornady, Buffalo Bore and Garrett produce high intensity .45-70 loadings that may equal or exceed the power of the .444 Marlin. Some approach the power of the .458 Winchester Magnum (although with smaller bullets with a much lower sectional density) and are effective against dangerous game. Use of such loadings in older .45-70 firearms is dangerous and should not be attempted; for that reason, Marlin introduced the .450 Marlin, a belted version of the .45-70 cartridge that will not chamber in older .45-70 rifles. However, many .45-70 Model 1895 owners chose to use the traditional .45-70 loads for deer-sized game with the option of using the high intensity .45-70 loads for more dangerous game. The 1895M lever-action rifle chambered in .450 Marlin was offered from 2000 until 2009 and is no longer in production.

==== Guide Guns ====
One recent innovation growing in popularity is the "Guide Gun" concept. The name most probably originates from the types of longarms favored by Alaskan hunting and wilderness guides as a defense against attacks by bears. The Guide Gun concept consists of a handy, short-barreled (usually 16 to 20 inches) lever action in a large caliber such as the .444 Marlin, .45-70, or .450 Marlin with a 3/4-length magazine tube. Usually custom-made by a skilled gunsmith, these guns are usually fitted with either open sights (such as ghost rings or express sights), a reflex sight, holographic sight or a long eye-relief scope mounted on a scout rail. Marlin New Model 1895 actions are frequently used to build this type of firearm. In an attempt to capitalize on this trend, Marlin began offering custom versions of their New Model 1895 action beginning with the now-discontinued Models 1895SDT and 336SDT. Current "Guide Gun" models include the Models 1895G, 1895GS, 1895GBL, 1895SBL, and 1895m.

==== Conversions ====
Aside from existing Marlin models, the basic Model 336/Model 1895 receiver and lever-action mechanism has enjoyed some popularity as a parent for various wildcat caliber conversions. These custom rifles are increasingly popular in the western United States, Canada, and Alaska where encounters with grizzly bears and other potentially dangerous animals can be expected. Some of these wildcat cartridge conversions include the .450 Alaskan, .457 Wild West Magnum, .50 Alaskan, and the .510 Kodiak Express.

Of the conversions mentioned both the .450 Alaskan and the .457 Wild West Magnum do not require new barrels, but simply a chamber reaming and the required action modifications (referred to as "action lengthening"); the .457 Magnum also allows continued ability to use .45-70. The .510 Kodiak Express is the most powerful wildcat conversion available for the Marlin at 5,000+ ft-lbs. Both the .50 Alaskan and .510 Kodiak Express require a new barrel to be installed on the rifle.

The .45-90 Sharps (also called .45-90 WCF or simply .45-90) has occasionally been used in converted Marlin 1895 rifles. The .45-90 conversion involves modifications to the action that increase the bolt travel and action timing (to adjust when a round is ejected, and when a new round lifts to enter the chamber), and the chamber in the barrel is reamed to .45-90 specifications. The case of a .45-90 is more than a quarter inch longer than the .45-70. The limitations on bolt travel of a converted Model 336 rifles are generally limit its case overall length (COL) to 2.85 inches. The 2.85 COL allows all bullets that work with the .45-70 action to be used in the converted .45-90. The .45-90 converted 1895 actions have the same pressure limitations as the .45-70 actions.
