= .32-40 Ballard =

Rifle cartridge

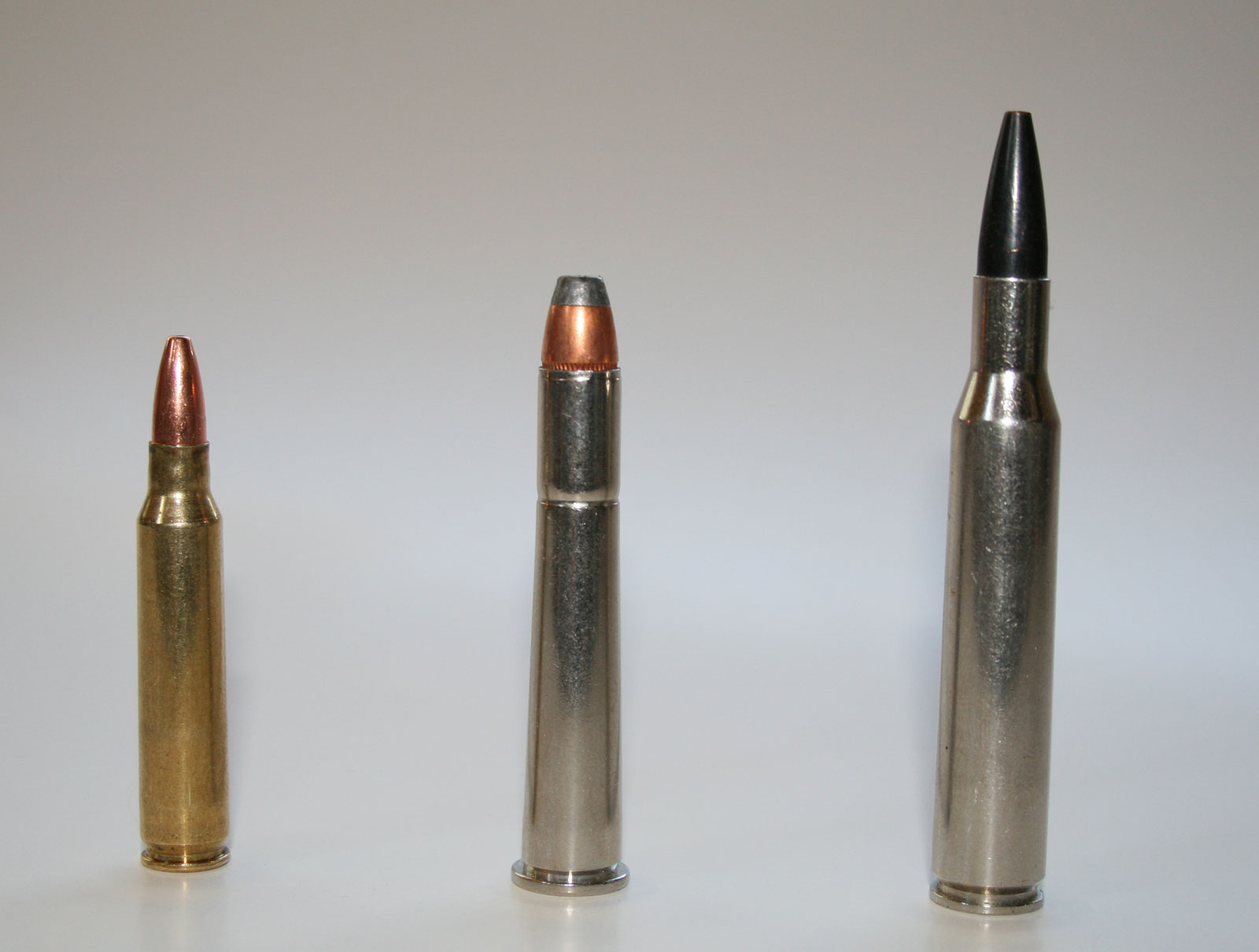
- .32-40 cartridge between .223 Remington (left) and .270 Winchester (right)
- Type: Rifle
- Place of origin: United States

Production history
- Designed: 1884
- Produced: 1884–present

Specifications
- Case type: Rimmed, straight
- Bullet diameter: .320 in (8.1 mm)
- Land diameter: .315 in (8.0 mm)
- Neck diameter: .338 in (8.6 mm)
- Base diameter: .424 in (10.8 mm)
- Rim diameter: .506 in (12.9 mm)
- Rim thickness: .063 in (1.6 mm)
- Case length: 2.13 in (54 mm)
- Overall length: 2.59 in (66 mm)
- Rifling twist: 1 in 16 in (410 mm)
- Primer type: Large rifle
- Maximum CUP: 30,000 CUP

Ballistic performance
Bullet mass/type	Velocity	Energy
165 gr (11 g)	1,440 ft/s (440 m/s)	760 ft⋅lbf (1,030 J)
165 gr (11 g)	1,430 ft/s (440 m/s)	755 ft⋅lbf (1,024 J)
155 gr (10 g)	1,460 ft/s (450 m/s)	786 ft⋅lbf (1,066 J)
165 gr (11 g)	1,740 ft/s (530 m/s)	1,109 ft⋅lbf (1,504 J)
- Test barrel length: 20 inches (510 mm)

The .32-40 Ballard / 8.1x54mmR, also known as .32-40 Winchester is an American rifle cartridge.

== Description ==
Introduced in 1884, the .32-40 Winchester was developed as a black powder match-grade round for the Ballard single-shot Union Hill Nos. 8 and 9 target rifles. Using a 165-grain (10.7 g) bullet and 40 grains (2.6 g) of black powder (muzzle velocity 1,440 ft/s (440 m/s), muzzle energy 760 ft⋅lbf (1,030 J)), the factory load gained a reputation for fine accuracy, with a midrange trajectory of 11 inches (28 cm) at 200 yd (180 m). It was available in Winchester and Marlin lever-action rifles beginning in 1886. Both the .32–40 Winchester and the .38-55 Winchester were chambered for the Model 1894 Winchester when it was introduced to the public in 1894. It stopped being a factory chambering around 1940.

It can be used for varmint and predator hunting, including coyotes and wolves. H. V. Stent has said that for a time the .32-40 Winchester and .38-55 Winchester were considered by some hunters to be usable for moose and elk at woods ranges, but sales of the Model 1894 in .30-30 Winchester (.30 WCF), a cartridge introduced a year later, soon outpaced the two because of its higher speed, higher energy, and flatter trajectory.

More recently, the .32-40 Winchester in a Model 1894 built in 1905 was successfully used by John Royer, from Pennsylvania, to show that it can still be used on whitetail deer at close range. He wanted to keep the shot within 75 yd (69 m). The range at which the .32-40 Winchester is suitable for deer is a matter of debate. Its common muzzle energy of less than 800 ft⋅lbf (1,100 J) is equal only to current 150 gr (9.7 g) and 170 gr (11 g) grain flat nose or round nose loadings of the .30-30 Winchester (in a 20 in (510 mm) barrel) at about 200 yd (180 m), which is often considered to be the maximum range of the .30-30 Winchester. However, it has been said that in a modern rifle it can be loaded to equal the .30-30 Winchester up to 300 yards (270 m).

In 2020, a Model 1894 Winchester rifle made in 1912 chambered in .32-40 Winchester was used by David J. LaPell in the Adirondack Mountains of New York to shoot a whitetail buck at the distance of approximately 60 yards. The bullet was a handloaded 170 grain Hornady Jacketed soft point.

The .32-40 Winchester also served as the basis for Harry Pope's Wildcat cartridge called the .33-40 Pope.

== See also ==
- 8 mm caliber
- List of rimmed cartridges
- List of cartridges by caliber
- List of rifle cartridges

== Sources ==
- Barnes, Frank C., ed. by John T. Amber. Cartridges of the World (Northfield, IL: DBI Books, 1972),
