= 7-30 Waters =

Custom cartridge for firearms

- Type: Rifle and single shot handgun
- Place of origin: United States

Production history
- Designer: Ken Waters
- Designed: 1976
- Produced: 1984–present

Specifications
- Parent case: .30-30 Winchester
- Case type: Rimmed, bottleneck
- Bullet diameter: .284 in (7.2 mm)
- Land diameter: .277 in (7.0 mm)
- Neck diameter: .306 in (7.8 mm)
- Base diameter: .422 in (10.7 mm)
- Rim diameter: .506 in (12.9 mm)
- Rim thickness: .058 in (1.5 mm)
- Case length: 2.04 in (52 mm)
- Overall length: 2.52 in (64 mm)
- Primer type: Large rifle
- Maximum pressure: 45,000 psi (310 MPa)
- Maximum CUP: 40,000 CUP

Ballistic performance
Bullet mass/type	Velocity	Energy
120 gr (8 g) Nosler Partition FP	2,700 ft/s (820 m/s)	1,940 ft⋅lbf (2,630 J)
139 gr (9 g) Flat point	2,540 ft/s (770 m/s)	1,990 ft⋅lbf (2,700 J)
154 gr (10 g) Round nose	2,347 ft/s (715 m/s)	1,835 ft⋅lbf (2,488 J)
- Test barrel length: 24"; Sources: Cartridges of the World, 10th Ed., Barnes

The 7-30 Waters cartridge was originally a wildcat cartridge developed by author Ken Waters in 1976 to give better performance to lever-action rifle shooters than the parent .30-30 Winchester cartridge, by providing a higher velocity and flatter trajectory with a smaller, lighter bullet. By 1984, Winchester introduced a Model 94 rifle chambered for the 7-30 Waters, establishing it as a commercial cartridge. In 1986, Thompson/Center began chambering 10-inch, 14-inch, and 20-inch Contender barrels for the cartridge.

== Development ==
A review of the 7-08 Rem. (a .308 Win. case necked down to 7 mm), explains the design of the cartridge with the following:

Anything a 7 mm can do, a .30 caliber of comparable sectional density and ballistic coefficient can also do. The catch is, in order to send a .30-caliber slug over a trajectory as flat as that 7 mm bullet, about 20 percent more recoil is going to be generated. . . . [A bullet in] 7 mm produces clearly superior downrange performance in terms of delivered energy and trajectory at any given recoil level [compared to a bullet in .30 caliber].

There are two primary reasons a 7 mm recoils less than a comparably effective .30 cal. cartridge: To match the 7 mm's ballistic coefficient requires a significantly heavier .30 cal bullet; and to drive that heavier .30 cal bullet at similar velocities (for kinetic energy and wind resistance ("time-to-target")), requires more powder. This combination of heavier bullets with heavier powder charges significantly increases the recoil of the .30 caliber.

The .30-30 Winchester is typically limited to short ranges, primarily because of the relatively small case capacity and the 150-grain and 170-grain bullet weights. To compensate for this, Waters necked the cartridge down to use a 7 mm bullet (.284 inches), rather than the original .308 caliber (7.62 mm) bullet. Because it was designed to function in lever-action rifles, the 7-30 maintained the same low working pressure, yet Waters' original design fired a lighter bullet (139 grains) at a higher velocity (2600 ft/s). A typical .30-30 factory load fires a 150-grain bullet at 2390 ft/s, while the current 7-30 factory load fires a 120-grain bullet at 2700 ft/s. Muzzle energy is just over 1900 ft-lbs for both of these loads, but the lighter weight 7 mm bullet has a higher velocity and flatter trajectory.

== Ammunition ==
Lever-action rifles with tubular magazines can only safely use spitzer bullets as the first cartridge in the chamber with only flat-pointed bullets in the magazine, or if the rifle is used as a 2-shot (1 cartridge in the chamber and only 1 in the magazine).

Handloaders for single-shot 7-30 Waters rifles or pistols are not limited to flat-nosed bullets and thus have a wide range manufacturers and weights of 7mm pointed bullets from which to choose.

=== Manufactured ammunition ===
Federal Cartridge offers manufactured 7-30 Waters cartridges—the Federal Premium Vital-Shok firing a 120-grain (7.78 g) Sierra GameKing boat-tail soft-point flat-nose bullet at 2700 ft/s with 1940 ft-lbs of energy. It has a sectional density of 0.213

Hornady Manufacturing Company's 2020 new products catalog does show 7-30 Waters LEVERevolution ammunition which would allow the safe use of pointed, ballistically efficient spitzer bullets in tubular magazines.

=== Handloading ===
Speer Bullets offers a 130 gr (8.42 gr), copper-jacketed soft-point flat-nosed bullet for use in lever-action rifles. It has a sectional density of 0.23 and a ballistic coefficient of 0.257

Hornady Manufacturing Company now offers a 120 grain FTX bullet in 7mm/.284" caliber. This allows the safe use of pointed, ballistically efficient spitzer bullets in tubular magazines.

== Firearms ==
=== Rifles ===
[T]he 7-30 Waters cartridge, with its flatter trajectory and higher velocity, have made [the Winchester Model 94] what many consider to be an ideal mountain rifle: lightweight, but capable of reaching out for the longer shots.

By 1982, Waters had perfected his new cartridge, firing a 139-grain flat-point bullet at a muzzle velocity of 2600 ft/s from a lever-action rifle with a 24" barrel. By 1983, he had managed to attract the attention of Winchester, which led to the introduction of the Model 94 angle eject 20" barreled carbine and Model 94XTR angle eject 24" barreled rifle in the new caliber in 1984. After 13 years, production ceased in 1997.

Thompson Center Arms' single-shot Contender and Encore rifles are both offered in 7-30 Waters in either stainless steel or blued steel through their custom shop.

=== Handguns ===
Thompson Center Arms began to chamber the 7-30 Waters in their Contender single shot pistol starting in 1986. Factory loads are capable of velocities of 2400 ft/s from the 14" pistol barrel, making the 7-30 Waters one of the fastest commercial rounds available for the pistol. In addition, the single shot Contender and Encore pistols can safely use pointed bullets, which allows the handloader to gain additional retained velocity at long ranges for uses such as handgun hunting and metallic silhouette shooting.

== Usage ==
Paco Kelly, of leverguns.com:

I like the model 94 Winchesters....and the 7 Waters fits the standard 94 action very well. It is exactly what it was designed for...a light, handy, and fairly powerful round and rifle for deer and black bear.

Bullets in the 110- to 120-grain range are suitable for small game and varmints (handloads with 110s can nearly achieve 3000 ft/s); 120- to 154-grain range for deer; and 154 to 168 gr range are adequate for larger game at closer ranges. "The 7-30 Waters has proven its capabilities in the field on big game weighing up to 300 pounds at woods ranges. As this is written, two bullets of flat nose form are available to handloaders for use in rifles with tubular magazines. For whitetails, the 120-grain Nosler is an excellent performer, but when greater penetration is needed for Mule Deer and Black Bear, the 139-grain Hornady is a better choice." Nosler and Hornady no longer offer flat nose bullets in 7mm.

Best performance is often had with the rifle barrel; with the shorter carbine barrels the .30-30 is usually a better choice. With the long barrel, however, the 7-30 provides flatter trajectory, and a longer effective range, as well as reduced recoil from the lighter bullets. Despite the advantages, the 7-30 still is behind the .30-30 in popularity, however.

Where the 7-30 has gained a strong foothold is in handguns. In the field of handgun metallic silhouette shooting, a suitably loaded 7-30 Waters provides performance equal to other 7mm wildcats, such as the 7mm International Rimmed, but without the work of forming cases. It also adds the bonus of being able to shoot commercial ammunition, with some performance loss.

== See also ==
- List of rimmed cartridges
