= .25-35 Winchester =

US smokeless rifle cartridge

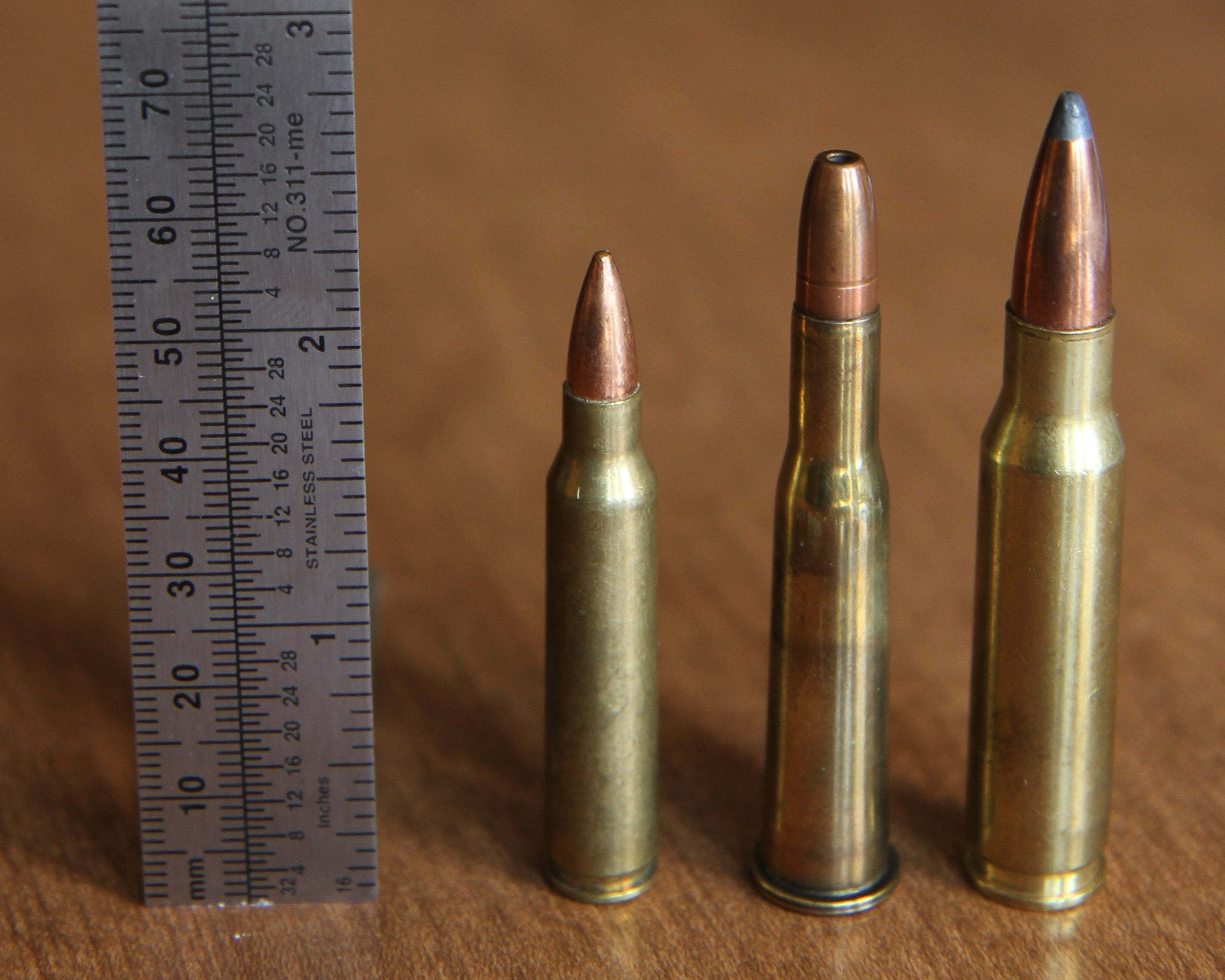
- .25-35 Winchester (center) with .223 Rem (left) and .308 Win (right)
- Type: Rifle
- Place of origin: United States

Production history
- Designer: Winchester
- Designed: 1895
- Manufacturer: Winchester
- Produced: 1895–present
- Variants: .25-35 Ackley Improved, 6.5×52mmR

Specifications
- Parent case: .30-30 Winchester
- Case type: Rimmed, bottlenecked
- Bullet diameter: .258 in (6.6 mm)
- Neck diameter: .282 in (7.2 mm)
- Shoulder diameter: .365 in (9.3 mm)
- Base diameter: .422 in (10.7 mm)
- Rim diameter: .506 in (12.9 mm)
- Rim thickness: .063 in (1.6 mm)
- Case length: 2.043 in (51.9 mm)
- Overall length: 2.55 in (65 mm)
- Rifling twist: 1 in 8 in (200 mm)
- Primer type: Large Rifle
- Maximum pressure: 44,000 psi (300 MPa)
- Maximum CUP: 37,000 CUP

Ballistic performance
Bullet mass/type	Velocity	Energy
60 gr (4 g) JFP	3,026 ft/s (922 m/s)	1,220 ft⋅lbf (1,650 J)
75 gr (5 g) JFP	2,815 ft/s (858 m/s)	1,320 ft⋅lbf (1,790 J)
90 gr (6 g) LFP	2,513 ft/s (766 m/s)	1,458 ft⋅lbf (1,977 J)
117 gr (8 g) RN	2,357 ft/s (718 m/s)	1,444 ft⋅lbf (1,958 J)
- Test barrel length: 24"; Source: Hodgdon

The .25-35 Winchester Center Fire (6.6x51mmR) was introduced in 1895 by Winchester for the Winchester Model 1894. Together with the .30-30 Winchester, it was one of the earliest smokeless cartridges designed in North America for a sporting rifle. Savage adopted it for its Savage Model 99 lever-action rifles. The case was based on the .30-30 cartridge.

== Performance ==
The standard .25-35 Winchester load is about three times as powerful in muzzle energy as the .25-20 Winchester, a cartridge of similar bore size previously introduced by Winchester. The .25-35 was valued for its speed, trajectory, and lower recoil. It was a popular round in the Winchester Model 1885 High Wall single-shot rifle. In the U.S. Winchester stopped general production of .25-35 rifles in 1955, but keeps producing ammunition. Hornady Ammunition produces a LEVERevolution .25-35 110-grain load with an MV of 2435 fps and a ME of 1436 ft-lb.

The .25-35 can be used to hunt deer, though in common loadings only at close range because of their low energy levels. In standard loadings in a 20-inch barrel, the cartridge retains only about 800 to 900 fpe at 100 yards, or about what its sister cartridge the .30-30 has at about 200 yards. Hornady's LEVERevolution load for the .25-35 (tested in a 24-inch barrel) lists about 900 fpe at 200 yards; and the manufacturer claims the load is suited for deer and antelope.

Grits Gresham tells of watching a father help his two sons to shoot their first mule deer bucks, at ranges of about 75 and 125 yards, with the same .25-35 rifle he had used years earlier to shoot his first deer. Charles Askins, who had used the .25-35 on whitetail deer, later wrote, "The fact that the .25-35 cartridge is now as obsolete as button shoes and coal oil lamps had utterly nothing to do with its lethality. So far as I could see it killed the 160-lb. Oklahoma bucks quite as devastatingly as the .30-30." Some consider it better suited, or suited also, for small predators such as coyotes.

As a matter of history, some hunters in both Canada and the United States have used it on large game such as moose. Richard Mellon's grandfather, a trapper in northern Alberta, used a .25-35 to fire three shots for three kills on one hunt: two just seconds apart on a cow moose and a bull moose and a third moments later on a whitetail buck. He also used it on wolves. H. V. Stent tells of Howard Clarke, a Canadian guide, who used a .25-35 to finish off moose his clients had wounded. Olive Fredricksen, a widow living with her children in northern B.C., used her carbine to kill moose to feed her family decades ago.

It has also been used on elk: John Barsness repeats a story told by Francis Sell, who met a rancher who had just shot a 5-point bull elk with a .25-35 and said he had killed several others with the caliber. However, this cartridge is not recommended today on moose and elk for most hunters because of its low energy level, the hunting skills required to get close, and the shooting discipline needed to place the bullet well or refrain from firing. While much of this is true when using any sporting calibers on game, the need is reinforced when using a close-range, low-energy round on larger game.

Speaking of the .25-35 skillfully and successfully used by his grandfather in the 1930s to provide food for a household with eight children, Richard Mellon says, "I don't know what ever happened to Grandpa's .25-35. I do know I wish it could talk. We judge rifles and cartridges by seemingly irrelevant standards compared to the days when the difference between good and bad was life and death."

== 6.5×52mmR ==
The 6.5×52mmR is a European cartridge that is a close variant of the .25-35 Winchester. It should not be considered identical to the .25-35 Winchester and is not treated as such by the Commission Internationale Permanente pour l'Epreuve des Armes à Feu Portatives (CIP), which has released separate specifications for each cartridge. The 6.5x52mmR has its origins in Germany and was introduced by RWS and is chambered in many drilling and single-shot rifles. Any interchangeability between the two cartridges is solely dependent on individual chamber tolerances and should not be assumed.

== See also ==
- 6 mm caliber
- List of rifle cartridges
- Winchester rifle
