= .33-40 Pope =

Rifle cartridge

- Type: Rifle
- Place of origin: United States

Production history
- Designer: Harry Pope
- Designed: 1900

Specifications
- Parent case: .32-40 Ballard
- Case type: Rimmed, straight
- Bullet diameter: .338 in (8.6 mm)
- Neck diameter: .356 in (9.0 mm)
- Base diameter: .424 in (10.8 mm)
- Rim diameter: .506 in (12.9 mm)
- Rim thickness: .063 in (1.6 mm)
- Case length: 2.13 in (54 mm)
- Overall length: 2.59 in (66 mm)
- Rifling twist: 1 in 16
- Primer type: Large rifle

The .33-40 Pope is a wildcat cartridge designed around 1900 by Harry Pope, a noted rifleman. The cartridge is a necked up .32-40 Ballard. It was Pope's favorite wildcat, and was often used with great success by him.
