= .356 Winchester =

Rifle cartridge

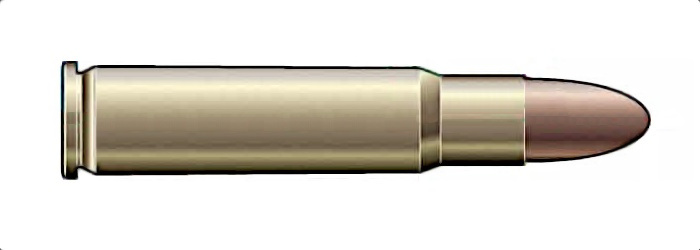
- Type: Rifle
- Place of origin: United States

Production history
- Designer: Winchester
- Designed: 1982
- Manufacturer: Winchester
- Produced: 1982–present

Specifications
- Parent case: .307 Winchester
- Case type: Semi-rimmed, bottleneck
- Bullet diameter: .358 in (9.1 mm)
- Land diameter: .350 in (8.9 mm)
- Neck diameter: .388 in (9.9 mm)
- Shoulder diameter: .454 in (11.5 mm)
- Base diameter: .4703 in (11.95 mm)
- Rim diameter: .506 in (12.9 mm)
- Rim thickness: .048 in (1.2 mm)
- Case length: 2.015 in (51.2 mm)
- Overall length: 2.56 in (65 mm)
- Rifling twist: 1-12"
- Maximum CUP: 52,000 CUP

The .356 Winchester (9.1x65mmSR) is a semi-rimmed, bottle-necked, centerfire rifle cartridge which was designed for use in lever-action rifles. It was developed concurrently with the .307 Winchester which acted as the parent cartridge. Both cartridges were introduced in 1982 in the then-new Model 94 XTR lever-action rifle.

== Description ==
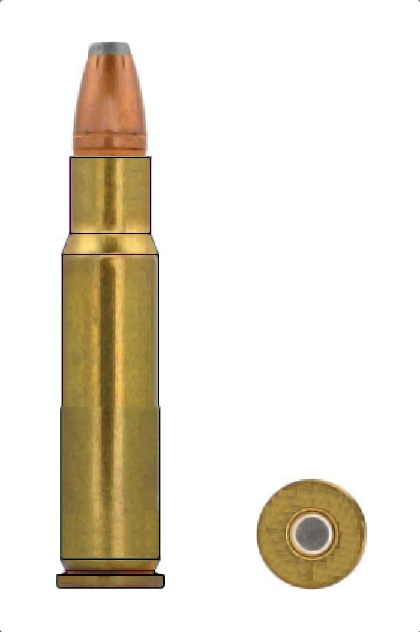
The .356 Winchester cartridge.

The .356 Winchester was developed using the case similar to that of the .308 Winchester but which featured a semi-rimmed design so as to operate through a lever-action rifle. Hence the .358 Winchester, which is essentially .308 Winchester necked up to accept a .358 in (9.1 mm) bullet, is very similar to that of the .356 Winchester, with the only difference being the design of the rim.

Performance of the .356 Winchester is close to that of the .358 Winchester giving up only 50–100 ft/s (15–30 m/s) with any bullet weight. However, the .356 has slightly less case capacity than the .358 Winchester due to its thicker brass case. Furthermore, heavier bullets will need to be seated more deeply than in the .358 Winchester as the cartridge has to function reliably through a lever rifle's feeding mechanism. For these reasons the factory 250 gr (16 g) bullet loses about 90 ft/s (27 m/s) to the .358 Winchester while the 200 gr (13 g) factory load is only 30 ft/s (9.1 m/s) slower.

The Marlin Model 336ER was offered in .356 Winchester for several years, but was discontinued in 1987. The same year, Winchester ceased production of their Model 94s chambered for .356 Winchester. It was brought back immediately in 1988, but was again discontinued in the mid-1990s.

Despite its nomenclature, .356 Winchester actually uses a .358 caliber bullet. Olin engineers who developed the .356 Winchester advise against loading it with anything other than flat-nose or Hornady Leverevolution bullets for use in a tubular-magazine lever action rifle. If being loaded for use in single-shot, double-rifle, or most bolt action rifles, any bullet type could be used.

== Dimensions ==
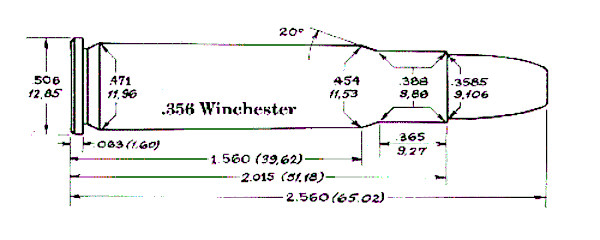

== See also ==
- List of rifle cartridges
- Glossary of firearms terminology
