= Frieda Van Themsche =

Belgian politician

- Born: Frieda Leontine Mauritia Van Themsche; 26 April 1955; Uccle, Belgium
- Died: 16 March 2023 (aged 67); Oostrozebeke, Belgium
- Occupation: Politician

Frieda Leontine Mauritia Van Themsche (born 26 April 1955 – 16 March 2023) was a member of the Belgian federal parliament.

== 1955–2003 ==
Van Themsche was born in Uccle into a Flemish-nationalist family. Her father Karel and his twin brother fought on the side of the Waffen-SS on the Eastern Front during the Second World War. Her father lost a leg, his brother died.

Her brother, Hans van Themsche's father, was a founding member of the Vlaams Blok. Hans Van Themsche has been convicted of several racist murders, which he committed in the city of Antwerp in the spring of 2006.

After marriage, Van Themsche moved to Harelbeke. Before going into politics, she was a teacher for seven years.

== 2003–2023 ==
Frieda Van Themsche was a member of parliament for Vlaams Blok from 2003 to 2007.

After her first speech to the Belgian Chamber of Representatives, Van Themsche pronounced the words "België Barst" ('Belgium must crack'). Then-chairman of the Chamber, Flemish Liberal Herman De Croo, gave the order to delete the words from the minutes of the parliamentary assembly.

On 14 September 2003, Van Themsche's son, Floris Vandenbroucke, was run over by a car in Kuurne. He died on the spot at the age of fifteen years. The offender committed a hit and run and was not found. The event spurred Van Themsche's interest in traffic regulations, road safety, and speeding. In May 2005, Van Themsche proposed to ban trucks from the roads on Sundays and public holidays.

Van Themsche left federal politics in 2007. The immediate cause of her departure was the Virginia Tech massacre, which once again brought attention to the deadly excursion of her nephew Hans in Antwerp in 2006. Additionally, her pregnant daughter living with a man of Moroccan origin played a role.

She was a councilor in the Harelbeke city council for Vlaams Belang from 2001 to 2012.
