= .38-55 Winchester =

Rifle cartridge designed by the Ballard Rifle & Cartridge Company

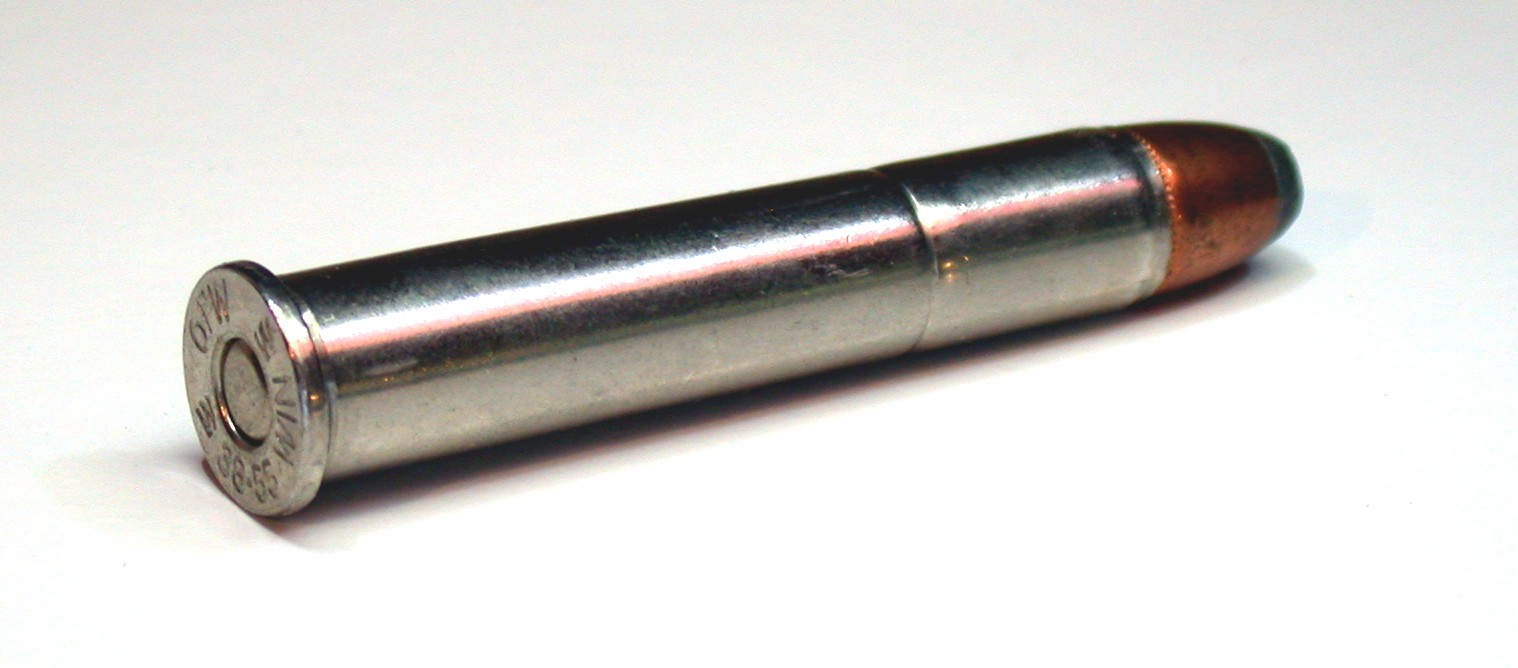
- Type: Rifle
- Place of origin: United States

Production history
- Designer: Ballard Rifle & Cartridge Company
- Designed: 1884
- Produced: 1884–present
- Variants: .38-55 Winchester +P

Specifications
- Parent case: .38-50 Ballard Everlasting
- Case type: Rimmed, straight
- Bullet diameter: .377 in (9.6 mm)
- Land diameter: .373 in (9.5 mm)
- Neck diameter: .392 in (10.0 mm)
- Base diameter: .421 in (10.7 mm)
- Rim diameter: .506 in (12.9 mm)
- Case length: 2.085 in (53.0 mm)
- Overall length: 2.550 in (64.8 mm)
- Rifling twist: 1 in 18 in (460 mm)
- Maximum pressure (CIP): 35,000 psi (240 MPa)
- Maximum CUP: 30,000 (Standard Pressure) and 38,000 (+P Pressure) CUP

Ballistic performance
Bullet mass/type	Velocity	Energy
255 gr (17 g) Black powder / low-pressure smokeless	1,321 ft/s (403 m/s)	987 ft⋅lbf (1,338 J)
255 gr (17 g) High velocity	1,593 ft/s (486 m/s)	1,437 ft⋅lbf (1,948 J)
255 gr (17 g) Buffalo Bore J.F.N. Bonded Core +P	1,950 ft/s (590 m/s)	2,153 ft⋅lbf (2,919 J)

The .38-55 Ballard, later called .38-55 Winchester, or in metric terms 9.6x53mmR (actually .3775 caliber), is a straight-walled centerfire rifle cartridge based on an earlier .38-50 Ballard Everlasting cartridge introduced in 1876 by the Ballard Rifle & Cartridge Company. First chambered by Ballard and Marlin Firearms, it was later offered by Winchester, who renamed it to .38-55 Winchester, as the first chambering of its Model 1894. The .38-55 Winchester was identical to the .38-55 Ballard, but was loaded with smokeless powder rather than black powder.

== History ==
The .38-55 Ballard was originally a black-powder cartridge as used in Ballard and Marlin Firearms from 1876 onwards for various single-shot target rifles. The original cartridge was very thin-walled with a folded head, and held 55 gr (3.6 g) (hence the 55 in the name) of black powder. The shell was later made thicker and stronger to allow reloading, and could only hold 48 gr (3.1 g) of powder, but the original designation remained.

Marlin's 1893 lever-action rifle was available in 38-55 using a Black-powder only barrel, or another barrel designated "Special Smokeless Steel" capable of safely using 38-55 cartridges loaded with the then relatively new and higher pressure smokeless powders. Marlin offered it later in some Model 336 rifles as well.

Winchester continued to use the round in various rifles until about 1940, and also used it in a few commemorative editions of rifles since then. In addition, it was used in non-lever action rifles such as the Remington-Lee bolt-action. The .38-55 Winchester is also the parent case for the .30-30 Winchester, .32 Winchester Special, and the .375 Winchester cartridges.

A modernized version of the cartridge debuted in 1978 as the .375 Winchester, designed with higher pressures and to be used in modern firearms only. It is not safe to fire factory .375 Winchester ammunition in rifles chambered in .38-55, especially in older examples. The brass is very similar (shortened by approximately 1 millimetre (0.0394 in)), but using modern, higher pressure .375 loads in an older rifle could cause serious injury to the shooter.

== Uses ==
The .38-55 is used to hunt black bear and deer at moderate ranges and is also used in cowboy action shooting side matches.

== See also ==
- .360 Buckhammer
- .375 Winchester
- List of rimmed cartridges
- List of rifle cartridges
- Table of handgun and rifle cartridges
