= .32 Winchester Special =

American rifle cartridge

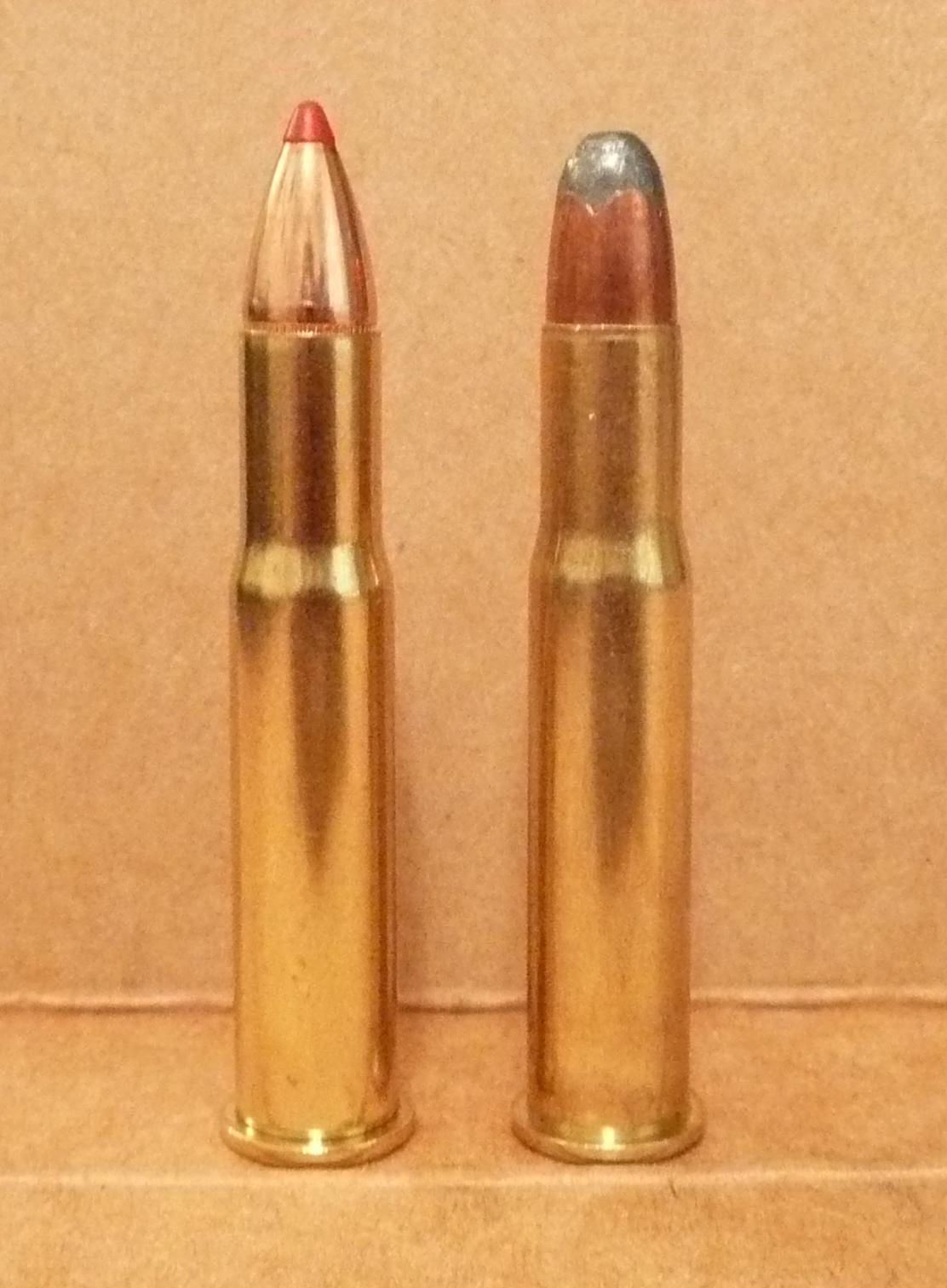
- .32 Winchester Special in 165 grain Hornady FTX (left) and 170 grain Remington SP (right)
- Type: Rifle
- Place of origin: United States

Production history
- Designer: Winchester
- Designed: 1899
- Produced: 1899–present

Specifications
- Parent case: .38-55 Winchester
- Case type: Rimmed, bottleneck
- Bullet diameter: .321 in (8.2 mm)
- Land diameter: .315 in (8.0 mm)
- Neck diameter: .343 in (8.7 mm)
- Shoulder diameter: .401 in (10.2 mm)
- Base diameter: .422 in (10.7 mm)
- Rim diameter: .506 in (12.9 mm)
- Rim thickness: .063 in (1.6 mm)
- Case length: 2.040 in (51.8 mm)
- Overall length: 2.565 in (65.2 mm)
- Case capacity: 45 gr H_{2}O (2.9 cm^{3})
- Rifling twist: 1 in 16 in (410 mm)
- Primer type: Large rifle
- Maximum pressure: 42,000 psi (290 MPa)
- Maximum CUP: 38,000 CUP

Ballistic performance
Bullet mass/type	Velocity	Energy
170 gr (11 g) JFP	2,283 ft/s (696 m/s)	1,968 ft⋅lbf (2,668 J)
165 gr (11 g) FTX	2,410 ft/s (730 m/s)	2,128 ft⋅lbf (2,885 J)

The .32 Winchester Special / 8.2x51mmR (or .32 WS) is a rimmed cartridge created in October 1898 for use in the Winchester Model 94 lever-action rifle. It is similar in name but unrelated to the .32-20 Winchester cartridge (which is also known as .32 WCF).

== History ==
The .32 Winchester Special cartridge, like the .30-30 Winchester cartridge of 1895, is necked down from the .38-55 Winchester cartridge of 1884. The .32 Winchester Special (.321 in) differs from the .30-30 Winchester (.308 in) in bullet diameter. More significantly, Winchester decreased the rate of rifling twist in their Model 94 rifle, from 1:12 when chambered for the .30-30 to 1:16 when chambered for the .32 Winchester Special. Winchester used the slower twist to reduce fouling retention when creating a new cartridge for sportsmen who wanted to reload their own ammunition using black powder and cast bullets. It was also marketed as something more powerful than the .30-30 and yet had less recoil than the .30-40 Krag, AKA .30 Army. This new cartridge enjoyed only moderate success, and remained hampered by the small selection of available bullets in the .321 diameter. There is a wide selection of bullet types and weights for the .30-30, while the only commonly available bullets in .321 diameter are 170 grain and 165 grain. Also, due to the slow twist of the barrel, accuracy suffered when the barrel exhibited wear.

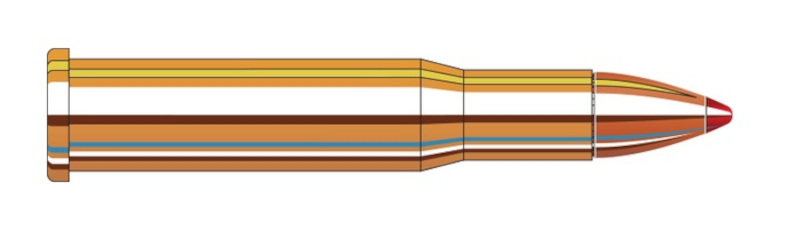
The .32 WS cartridge

== Performance ==
Ballistics are similar to the .30-30 cartridge and its .308 caliber (7.62 mm) bullet, but the larger diameter .321 (8.15 mm) bullet of the .32 WS will create a larger wound. However, given the same weight of bullet in both calibers, the .30 caliber has a greater sectional density, and correspondingly greater penetration. According to Winchester's original claims, the .32 WS has 5-10% more energy than the .30-30 at close ranges, and less at longer ranges due to increased drag due to the .321's greater diameter and reduced sectional density.

== Dimensions ==
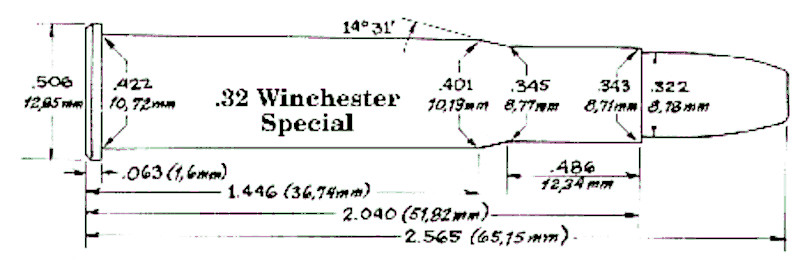

== See also ==
- 8 mm caliber
- List of rimmed cartridges
- List of rifle cartridges
- Table of handgun and rifle cartridges
