= .30-30 Winchester =

Rifle cartridge designed by the Winchester Repeating Arms Company

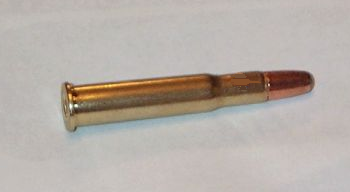
- .30 WCF cartridge
- Type: Rifle
- Place of origin: United States

Production history
- Designer: Winchester
- Designed: 1895
- Manufacturer: Winchester
- Produced: 1895–present
- Variants: 7-30 Waters; .25-35 Winchester; .219 Zipper; .30-30 Ackley Improved; .32 Winchester Special

Specifications
- Parent case: .38-55 Winchester
- Case type: Rimmed, bottleneck
- Bullet diameter: .308 in (7.8 mm)
- Land diameter: .300 in (7.6 mm)
- Neck diameter: .330 in (8.4 mm)
- Shoulder diameter: .401 in (10.2 mm)
- Base diameter: .422 in (10.7 mm)
- Rim diameter: .506 in (12.9 mm)
- Rim thickness: .063 in (1.6 mm)
- Case length: 2.039 in (51.8 mm)
- Overall length: 2.550 in (64.8 mm)
- Primer type: Large rifle
- Maximum pressure (CIP): 46,000 psi (320 MPa)
- Maximum pressure (SAAMI): 42,000 psi (290 MPa)
- Maximum CUP: 38,000 CUP

Ballistic performance
Bullet mass/type	Velocity	Energy
110 gr (7 g) FP	2,684 ft/s (818 m/s)	1,760 ft⋅lbf (2,390 J)
130 gr (8 g) FP	2,496 ft/s (761 m/s)	1,799 ft⋅lbf (2,439 J)
150 gr (10 g) FN	2,390 ft/s (730 m/s)	1,903 ft⋅lbf (2,580 J)
160 gr (10 g) cast LFN	2,330 ft/s (710 m/s)	1,929 ft⋅lbf (2,615 J)
170 gr (11 g) FP	2,227 ft/s (679 m/s)	1,873 ft⋅lbf (2,539 J)

The .30-30 Winchester / 7.62×52mmR (officially named the .30 Winchester Center Fire or .30 WCF) cartridge was first marketed for the Winchester Model 1894 lever-action rifle in 1895. The .30-30 (pronounced "thirty-thirty"), as it is most commonly known, along with the .25-35 Winchester, was offered that year as the United States' first small-bore sporting rifle cartridges designed for smokeless powder. Since its introduction, it has been utilized alongside the development of flatter shooting cartridges, most prominently those derived from designs subsidized by interest in military expenditures (e.g., .303 British, .30-06, and 6.5x55 Swedish). The .30-30 has remained in widespread use almost entirely because of reliable effectiveness in civilian applications, particularly for hunting game animals.

The .30-30 is by far the most common cartridge shot from lever action rifles. The .30-30 is substantially more powerful than the Magnum handgun cartridges (e.g., .357, .41, .44, etc.) also often paired with lever actions, and produces that energy with about 14% less recoil than .44 Magnum. While its old rival .35 Remington produces more muzzle energy and recoil, the .30-30 will often retain more terminal energy. The .30-30 is not commonly used for extreme long-range shooting across wide-open spaces, but modern innovations in ballistic tipped bullets for leverguns have moved the long-range capabilities of the .30-30 somewhat closer to parity with higher-velocity cartridges. In any case, a hunting-specific advantage of the .30-30 over those cartridges is that it leaves lower volumes of spoiled (destroyed or bloodshot) venison after a kill, leading to less waste.

== Naming ==
The .30 Winchester Smokeless first appeared in Winchester's catalog No. 55, dated August 1895. When chambered in the Winchester Model 1894 carbine and rifle, it was also known as .30 Winchester Center Fire or .30 WCF. When the cartridge was chambered in the Marlin Model 1893 rifle, rival gunmaker Marlin used the designation .30-30 or .30-30 Smokeless. The added -30 stands for the standard load of 30 grains (1.9 g) of early smokeless powder and is based on late-19th century American naming conventions for black powder-filled cartridges. Both Marlin and Union Metallic Cartridge Co. also dropped the Winchester appellation, as they did not want to put the name of rival Winchester on their products.

The modern designation of .30-30 Winchester was arrived at by using Marlin's variation of the name with the Winchester name appended as originator of the cartridge, but .30 WCF is still seen occasionally.

== Characteristics and use ==
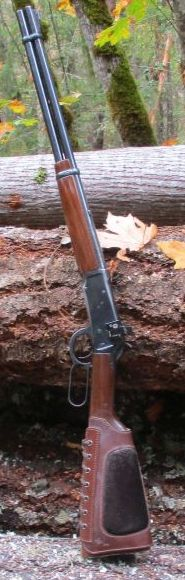
A Winchester 1894 in .30 WCF

=== Ballistics and early performance ===
When the .30 WCF was introduced, it was seen as fast and flat-shooting: 160 or 165 grains at 1,900 to 2,000 fps and a 4 inch drop at 200 yards if sighted in for 150 yards. The cartridge's common loads are a 150 grain bullet (MV 2,390 fps from a 24-inch barrel) and 170 grain (MV 2,200 fps from a 24-inch barrel).

Use on big game in North America

In Canada and the U.S., the cartridge has likely, at some point, been used on all big game species. More recently, it has been used on whitetail, mule deer, pronghorn, caribou, elk, moose, and black bear. It is commonly said that in the U.S. and Canada more deer have been killed with the .30-30 than with any other cartridge, and perhaps this was true for a time in the U.S. Although military surplus rifles in .303 British were widely available in Canada, the .30-30 was so common that for many years the Hudson Bay Company and other stores in remote areas stocked only .30-30 ammunition. The .30-30 is commonly seen as usable on deer up to 150 to 200 yards.

Moose hunting and international legal considerations

In Canada, the .30-30 has a long history of use on moose—one writer calling it "a standby for moose" in Canada's northern forests. In some circles, it continues to be used, yet modern opinions on its suitability for moose are mixed: Paul Robertson, a Canadian hunting firearms columnist, says, "Too many moose have been taken with the 30/30 to rule it out as good for this purpose as well." However, while the .30-30 is legal for hunting moose in Newfoundland, Canada, provincial authorities do not recommend its use. The cartridge, with flat- or round-nosed bullets and 20th century powder charges, does not meet minimum energy standards required for moose hunting in Finland, Norway, or Sweden. Modern propellants which produce more energy with less pressure may be used in ammunition to exceed legal requirements for those who wish to hunt across Scandinavia from rifle length barrels without fear of consequential arbitration. Thor Strimbold, a Canadian who has made more than 20 one-shot kills on moose with a .30-30, advises most moose hunters to use more than minimal power if they can handle the recoil. It is generally agreed that large game can be struck by the average marksman at distances that exceed the capacity to bring them down cleanly. Therefore, depending upon precise implementation it is appropriate for a practical limitation with room for error in such tasks should be kept in mind accordingly for game such as elk and moose. Hunting technique and style, as well as law and culture, influence cartridge choices.

Recoil characteristics

Average recoil from a typical 150-grain load at 2,390 feet per second (730 m/s) in a 7.5 lb (3.4 kg) rifle has been calculated to be 10.6 foot-pounds (14.4 J) felt at the shooter's shoulder. For point of reference, that falls roughly between that of a .410 and a 20 gauge shotgun. Ordinarily recoil feels similar to slightly greater than a .243 Winchester, and about half that of the .30-06 Springfield.

Affordability, rifle availability, and cultural persistence

For a period of time, the Model 94 in .30-30 was relatively inexpensive, which helped its popularity. Today, the cost of a .30-30 is matched by some entry-level bolt-action sporting rifles. The .30-30 remains popular, though, among some hunters who value a short, handy rifle used at ranges that will likely not exceed 150 yards (140 m). Mlllions of rifles have been produced in this caliber, with many passed on to a new generation of hunters. The practicality of hunting with an inherited rifle and cartridge, especially if the combination has been seen as effective at modest range, is an important factor in some circles. The widespread availability of .30-30 loads, which can cost less than some other calibers, is another factor. New rifles continue to be purchased and cartridge sales are strong.

Bullet design and magazine safety

Because the majority of rifles chambered in .30-30 are lever-action rifles with tubular magazines, most .30-30 cartridges are loaded with round-nose or flat-nose bullets for safety. This is to prevent a spitzer-point bullet from setting off the primer of the cartridge ahead of it in the magazine during recoil, resulting in potentially catastrophic damage to both firearm and shooter. The Savage Model 99 was introduced in 1899 with a rotary magazine, in part, to avoid that issue. When used in single-shot rifles or handguns, such as the Thompson Center Arms Contender or Encore series, it is common for shooters to hand load the cartridge with spire-point bullets for improved ballistics.

Modern bullet innovations

A notable exception to the "no pointed bullets" guideline for bullet selection in rifles with tubular magazines are the new flexible "memory elastomer"-tipped LEVERevolution cartridges as produced by Hornady. The soft tips of these bullets easily deform under compression, preventing detonations while under recoil in the magazine, yet also return to their original pointed shape when that pressure is removed, thus allowing for a more efficient bullet shape than previously available to load safely in such rifles. The more aerodynamic shape results in a flatter bullet trajectory and greater retained velocity downrange, significantly increasing the effective range of rifles chambered for this cartridge.

Depending upon the resources to which one has access, the ideal balance in terms of trajectory is typically found with 130–150 grain copper bullets, 135–165 grain copper jacketed bullets, and 150–190 grain cast or swaged lead bullets. Lighter bullets are excellent for medium game, though they tend to lose energy faster and be more susceptible to wind. Bullets on the heavier side may prove beneficial for specific rifles and circumstances. Flat pointed 170 grain copper jacketed bullets are the most popular trade off for heavier bullets, with minimal degradation to the handy "point and shoot" range, and cast bullets weighing around 180 grains may prove beneficial for retaining energy downrange with a similar trajectory. The heaviest bullets in commercially available ammunition weigh in at 190 grains, which cannot be achieved without reducing the powder charge, thus some power is necessarily traded for even greater consistency in penetration at short to medium range.

Bullet weight selection and practical trade-offs

Customized unconventional loads with bullets in excess of 190 or 200 grains are not unheard of, with the added weight being considered desirable for intentionally reduced charges and lower velocities that are found a good fit for a particular rifle. Even with heavy bullets, rifles can still produce favorable trajectories in comparison with the original 19th century configuration which tended to run 1900 to 2000 feet per second with a standard sized bullet. Similarly, extra light for caliber bullets may be utilized by the hand loader. 130 grain bullets may be among the lightest commercially available options if one has access, and a fairly popular choice for custom reduced recoil loads on medium game.

== Rifles and handguns chambered in .30-30 ==
The .30-30 is by far the most common chambering in lever-action rifles, such as the Marlin Model 336 and Winchester Model 1894. Some earlier Savage Model 99 rifles were chambered for this cartridge. Current production lever-action rifles include those by Marlin, Mossberg, Henry, and Winchester. Savage also produced a pump-action Model 170, both rifle and carbine, that was available in .30-30. In Europe, the .30-30 was occasionally used in a drilling, a three-barrelled firearm (one rifle barrel on top of two shotgun barrels).

The rimmed design is well suited for various single-shot actions, so it is commonly found there, as well. Rimmed cartridges are chambered in bolt action rifles, but .30-30 bolt actions are uncommon today. "At one time Winchester turned out the Model 54 bolt-action repeater in this caliber [.30 WCF], but it was a decided failure, chiefly because the man desiring a bolt action preferred to use one of the better and more powerful cartridges. However, in this particular caliber, the .30 WCF cartridge proved to be decidedly accurate." In addition, rimmed cartridges typically do not feed well with the box magazines normally found on bolt-action rifles. Other examples of bolt-action rifles offered in .30-30 Winchester are the Stevens Model 325, the Savage Model 340, the Springfield/Savage 840, and the Remington 788.

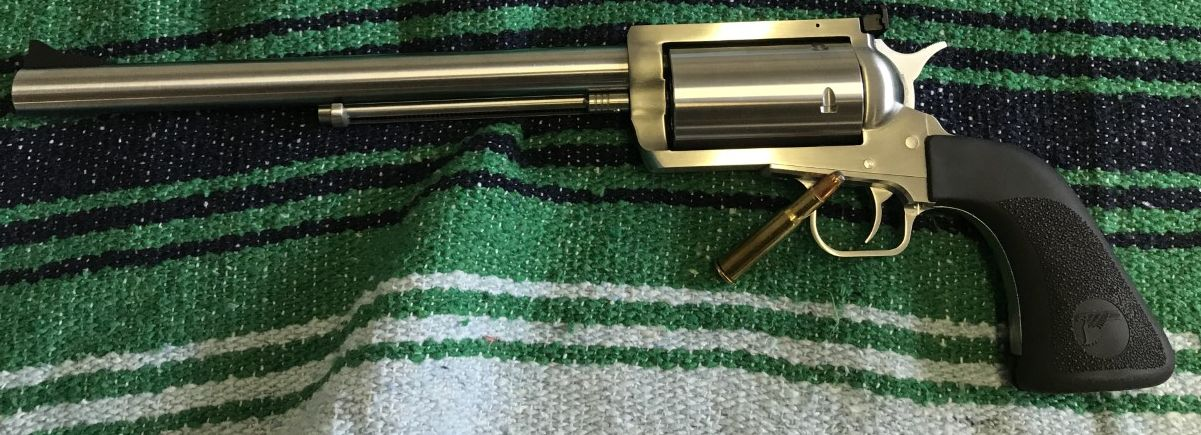
A Magnum Research BFR in .30-30

In the sport of handgun metallic silhouette shooting, the .30-30 has been used. The Thompson Center Arms Contender pistol, with its compact frame and break-action design, is available for the .30-30 cartridge. The .30-30 will produce velocities of nearly 2000 f/s (610 m/s) out of the 10 in (25 cm) Contender barrel, though recoil and muzzle blast are stronger due to the short barrel. The longer barrel results in significant reductions in felt recoil (due to increased weight) and muzzle blast, with higher velocities, especially if factory-loaded rifle ammunition is used. Magnum Research offers their five-shot BFR revolver in .30-30. In the U.S., some handgun hunters use the .30-30.

== As a parent case ==
In 2023, Remington introduced a new SAAMI-approved cartridge using the .30-30 Winchester as a parent case. The new cartridge, the .360 Buckhammer, or .360 BHMR for short, is based on a .30-30 Winchester case that has been blown out to get rid of the shoulder and necked up to accommodate .358-caliber bullets (the same bullets used in the .35 Remington). The .360 Buckhammer operates at higher pressure than the .30-30 Winchester, at 50,000 psi for the .360 Buckhammer versus 42,000 psi for the .30-30 Winchester. The .30-30 Winchester is also the parent case for the 7-30 Waters, .25-35 Winchester, and the .219 Zipper.

== Derivative cartridges ==
In addition to the most common factory derivations, the .25-35 Winchester (6.5×52mmR), .32 Winchester Special, and the less-known .219 Zipper, the .30-30 has also spawned many wildcat cartridges over the years. One example is the 7-30 Waters, made by necking the .30-30 case down to 7 mm (0.276 in). The 7-30 Waters eventually moved from a wildcat design to a factory chambering, with rifles being made by Winchester, and barrels made by Thompson/Center for their Contender pistol. Other .30-30-based wildcats are used almost exclusively in the Contender pistol. One of the more notable examples is the .30 Herrett, a .30-30 case necked back to reduce case capacity for more efficient loading with fast-burning powders. The .30 Herrett produces higher velocities with less powder than the larger .30-30 case in the short 10- and 14-in (25- and 35-cm) Contender barrels. Other examples are the .357 Herrett, developed to handle heavier bullets and larger game than the .30 Herrett, and the 7 mm International Rimmed, a popular metallic silhouette cartridge. Bullberry, a maker of custom Contender barrels, offers proprietary .30-30 wildcats in 6 mm, .25 caliber, and 6.5 mm diameters. In addition, P.O. Ackley used the cartridge as the basis for the .30-30 Ackley Improved.

== See also ==
- .30 Remington
- .300 Savage
- .30-40 Krag
- .400 Legend
- 7 mm caliber
- List of rimmed cartridges
- Table of handgun and rifle cartridges
