= .22 ARC =

Rifle cartridge

- Type: Rifle
- Place of origin: United States

Production history
- Designer: Hornady
- Designed: 2023
- Manufacturer: Hornady
- Produced: 2024–present

Specifications
- Parent case: 6.5mm Grendel
- Case type: Rimless tapered, bottleneck
- Bullet diameter: .2244 in (5.70 mm)
- Neck diameter: .253 in (6.4 mm)
- Shoulder diameter: .4297 in (10.91 mm)
- Base diameter: .441 in (11.2 mm)
- Rim diameter: .441 in (11.2 mm)
- Rim thickness: .059 in (1.5 mm)
- Case length: 1.525 in (38.7 mm)
- Overall length: 2.26 in (57.4 mm)
- Rifling twist: 1 in 7 in (180 mm)
- Maximum pressure (SAAMI): 52,000 psi (360 MPa)

Ballistic performance
Bullet mass/type	Velocity	Energy
62 gr (4 g) 22 ARC 62 gr ELD‑VT V‑Match	3,300 ft/s (1,000 m/s)	1,499 ft⋅lbf (2,032 J)
88 gr (6 g) 22 ARC 88 gr ELD Match	2,820 ft/s (860 m/s)	1,554 ft⋅lbf (2,107 J)
75 gr (5 g) 22 ARC 75 gr ELD Match Black	3,075 ft/s (937 m/s)	1,575 ft⋅lbf (2,135 J)
80 gr (5 g) 22 ARC 80 gr ELD‑X Precision Hunter	3,010 ft/s (920 m/s)	1,609 ft⋅lbf (2,182 J)
70 gr (5 g) 22 ARC 70 gr CX Superformance	3,125 ft/s (952 m/s)	1,518 ft⋅lbf (2,058 J)
- Test barrel length: 24 in Source: SAAMI

The .22 ARC, also called .22 Advanced Rifle Cartridge, is a SAAMI-standardized rimless tapered bottleneck rifle cartridge developed by Hornady. The cartridge was designed for use in AR-15–style rifles.

== History ==
.22 ARC was announced in October 2023 by Hornady. .22 ARC was released in 2024.

== Design ==
The .22 ARC is designed to get .22-250 Remington performance from AR-15 rifles.

== See also ==
- List of rifle cartridges
- 30-30 Winchester
- .350 Legend
- .35 Remington
- .35 Whelen
- .358 Winchester
- .360 Buckhammer
- .375 Winchester
- .400 Legend
- .450 Bushmaster
