= .338 Marlin Express =

Rifle cartridge

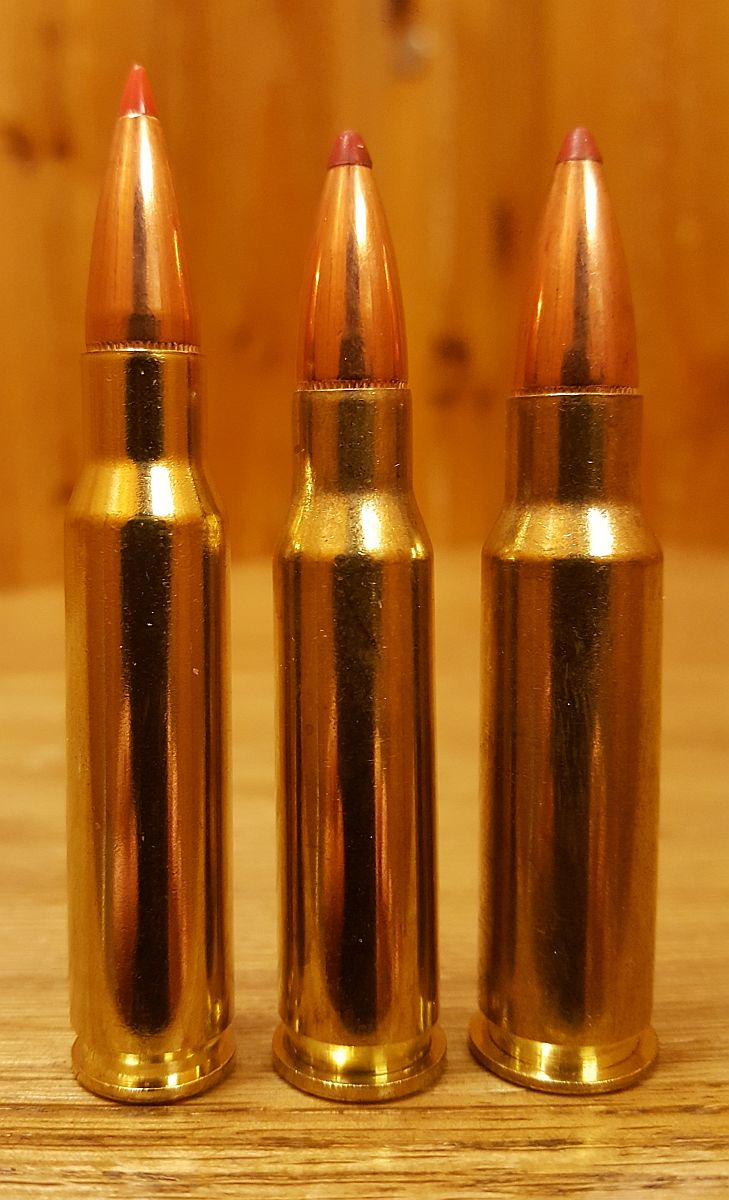
- .308 Winchester (left), with .308 Marlin Express (center), and .338 Marlin Express (right)
- Type: Rifle
- Place of origin: United States

Production history
- Designer: Marlin / Hornady
- Designed: 2009
- Manufacturer: Hornady
- Produced: 2009–2019

Specifications
- Parent case: .376 Steyr
- Case type: Semi-rimmed, bottleneck
- Bullet diameter: .338 in (8.6 mm)
- Neck diameter: .372 in (9.4 mm)
- Shoulder diameter: .496 in (12.6 mm)
- Base diameter: .502 in (12.8 mm)
- Rim diameter: .548 in (13.9 mm)
- Rim thickness: .045 in (1.1 mm)
- Case length: 1.886 in (47.9 mm)
- Overall length: 2.583 in (65.6 mm)
- Rifling twist: 1:12 in (300 mm)
- Primer type: WLR
- Maximum pressure (SAAMI): 46,500 psi (321 MPa)

Ballistic performance
Bullet mass/type	Velocity	Energy
200 gr (13 g) FTX (Hornady Flex Tip Expanding) (BC: .430)	781 m/s (2,560 ft/s)	2,922 J (2,155 ft⋅lbf)
- Test barrel length: 24 in (610 mm); Sources: 338 Marlin Express LEVERevolution at Hornady web site & MidwayUSA and C.I.P. Data

The .338 Marlin Express is a cartridge developed by Marlin Firearms and Hornady. It is based on the .376 Steyr with a goal to duplicate the venerable .30-06 Springfield's performance in a cartridge compatible with lever-action firearms. The cartridge uses a slightly shorter, rimmed case to function in lever-action rifles with tubular magazines. As introduced in Hornady's LEVERevolution line of cartridges, it follows the design logic of the .308 Marlin Express which preceded it. The .338MX fires heavier .338 caliber bullets than the .308 Marlin Express at roughly the same velocity. It is chambered in Marlin's Model 338MX and 338MXLR rifles using the Marlin Model 336 action.

== Design History and Cartridge Performance ==
Whereas the .308 Marlin Express began by modifying the .307 Winchester, Hornady and Marlin engineers started with a previous collaboration between Hornady and the Austrian arms maker Steyr, the .376 Steyr, when designing the .338 Marlin Express. The case of the .376 Steyr was given a thicker web for added strength, then necked down to .338. The .308 Marlin Express, on the other hand, was made with a thinner web than its parent case, the .307 Winchester, for additional capacity.

Although the thicker case webbing reduced capacity, new powders allow the .338 Marlin Express to achieve velocities similar to the .338 Federal with significantly lower pressures. Hornady engineers then looked to the projectile for the new cartridge. They settled on the 200-grain .338 projectile from their .338 Winchester Magnum line. The existing bullet was remade with a thinner jacket in order to promote expansion and upset at longer ranges. This 200-grain .338" projectile is able to impart significantly more energy than the 160 gr projectile used in the .308 Marlin Express, despite similar muzzle velocities.

Furthermore, the projectile's high ballistic coefficient allows the .338 Marlin Express to maintain velocity to greater distances than big bore lever cartridges such as .45-70, .444 Marlin, or even the high performance .450 Marlin.

Although the heavy bullet weight of these cartridges allow them more muzzle energy, the ballistic advantage of the .338 Marlin Express's projectile begins to show beyond 100 yards. After that point the .338 Marlin Express's projectile retains more energy than even the .450 Marlin. Like the .308 Marlin Express, the .338 Marlin Express was designed to be a relatively flat shooting cartridge, taking advantage of the bullets Hornady designed for the rounds. Its trajectory is similar to the .30-06 Springfield.

== Comparison ==
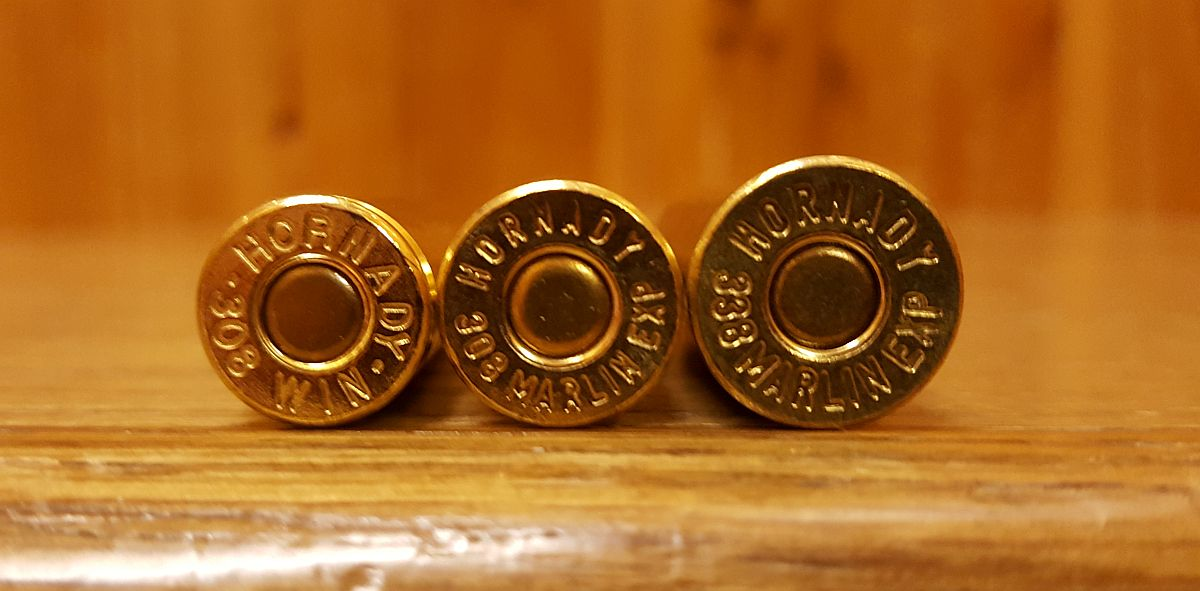
The .338 Marlin Express has a larger diameter than its .308 companion.

The .338 Marlin Express was designed to produce performance similar to the .30-06 Springfield. This would give lever-action hunters improved performance over their .30-30 Winchester rounds. The table below shows how the rounds compare. Reloading data for 200-grain (13 g) bullets for some of the cartridges is not available. Extensive loading data for the .338 Marlin Express is not yet available. The powder used in the Hornady loading is also not yet commercially available as of Feb '09. This round was designed with an elastomer tip, so that the .338 projectile would be safe for use in the tubular magazines of lever-action rifles.

Traditional spitzer bullets are not compatible with the tubular magazines. This is due to the danger of the hard, pointed bullet-tip igniting the primer of the round in front of it under recoil impulse. The softer tip eliminates the hazards of stacking pointed rounds end to end in a tubular magazine.

.338 Marlin Express quick comparison
Cartridge	Bullet Weight (gr)	Muzzle velocity(ft/s)	Muzzle energy(ft-lbf)	BC	Velocity (ft/s)/Energy (ft-lbf) @ 400yds
.338 Marlin Express	200	2565	2922	.430	1820/1471
.308 Marlin Express	160	2660	2513	?	1836/1197
.30-30 Winchester	160	2300	1880		
.30-06 Springfield	200	2542	2879		
.30-06 Springfield	200	2625	3061		
.376 Steyr (Parent Cartridge)	210	3011	4229		

Other comparable cartridges and loadings
Cartridge	Bullet Weight (gr)	Muzzle velocity(ft/s)	Muzzle energy(ft-lbf)	BC	Velocity (ft/s)/Energy (ft-lbf) @ 400yds
.307 Winchester	150gr	2693	2416		
.300 Savage	150gr FMJ	2765	2547		
.308 Winchester	150gr FMJ	2809	2629		
.308 Winchester	180gr Nos AccuBond	2550	2598		
.30-06 Springfield	150gr FMJ	2900	2820		
.30-06 Springfield	200gr SP	2542	2879		
.30-06 Springfield	200gr OPP	2625	3061		
.325 WSM	200gr Accubond CT	2950	3866		
.338 Federal	210gr Nos Part	2630	3226		
.338-06 A-Square	200	2773	3414	.430	± 2200/1800
.338-06 A-Square	225	2678	3582	.500	± 2200/2000
.338-06 A-Square	250	2531	3555	.650	± 2300/2000
.338 Winchester Magnum	200gr SP	2950	3866		
.340 Weatherby Magnum	200gr SP	3221	4607		
.348 Winchester	200gr	2530	2840		
.35 Remington	200gr Lead Flat Nose	2084	1929		
.358 Winchester	200gr SP	2500	2776		
.35 Whelen	200gr	2798	3478		
9.3x62mm Mauser	231 gr Oryx	2600	3550		

== See also ==
- .30-06 Springfield
- .308 Marlin Express
- .30-30 Winchester
- .338 Federal
- List of rifle cartridges
- Table of handgun and rifle cartridges
- 8 mm caliber
