= .338 Ruger Compact Magnum =

Rifle cartridge

- Type: Rifle
- Place of origin: United States

Production history
- Designer: Sturm Ruger
- Manufacturer: Hornady
- Produced: 2008

Specifications
- Parent case: .375 Ruger
- Case type: Rimless, bottleneck
- Bullet diameter: .338 in (8.6 mm)
- Neck diameter: .370 in (9.4 mm)
- Shoulder diameter: .515 in (13.1 mm)
- Base diameter: .532 in (13.5 mm)
- Rim diameter: .532 in (13.5 mm)
- Rim thickness: .050 in (1.3 mm)
- Case length: 2.015 in (51.2 mm)
- Overall length: 2.840 in (72.1 mm)
- Case capacity: 72 gr H_{2}O (4.7 cm^{3})
- Primer type: Large rifle
- Maximum pressure (CIP): 62,366 psi (430.00 MPa)

Ballistic performance
Bullet mass/type	Velocity	Energy
200 gr (13 g) Hornady SST	2,950 ft/s (900 m/s)	3,864 ft⋅lbf (5,239 J)
225 gr (15 g) Hornady Interbond	2,750 ft/s (840 m/s)	3,778 ft⋅lbf (5,122 J)

The .338 Ruger Compact Magnum or .338 RCM is a rimless, short-length rifle cartridge based on the .375 Ruger case. Sturm Ruger and Hornady jointly developed the round, which was released in 2008 and chambered in various Ruger rifles. The goal of the project was to produce a .338 caliber cartridge with magnum level performance that would fit in a compact, short action rifle. The .338 RCM is conceptually similar to the WSM cartridge family, but is somewhat smaller dimensionally. This often allows for a higher magazine capacity than the WSM equivalent. Like the .338 caliber cartridges which predated it, the round is designed for hunting medium to large sized North American game.

== Design & Specifications ==
The .338 Ruger Compact Magnum is based on the .375 Ruger cartridge, which originated through the cooperation of Hornady and Ruger. The case is of rimless design, having a base and rim diameter of .532 in (13.5 mm), the same diameter as the belt on the .300 H&H Magnum, the .375 H&H Magnum, and their derivatives. This design offers greater case capacity than a belted magnum case of comparable length, such as the 350 Remington Magnum. As Ruger intended the cartridge to be chambered in short bolt-action rifles, they trimmed the .375 Ruger parent case to 2.015 in (51.2 mm) to ensure a comparable cartridge overall length to the .308 Winchester. Unlike the rebated Winchester Short Magnum cartridges, the Ruger Compact Magnums share the same diameter from case head to body. This allowed Ruger to chamber the cartridge without extensively redesigning their M77 rifle.

== See also ==
- .338 Lapua Magnum
- .338 Marlin express
- .338 Federal
- .338 Remington Ultra Magnum
- .338 Winchester Magnum
- Table of handgun and rifle cartridges
