= .360 Buckhammer =

Hunting rifle cartridge

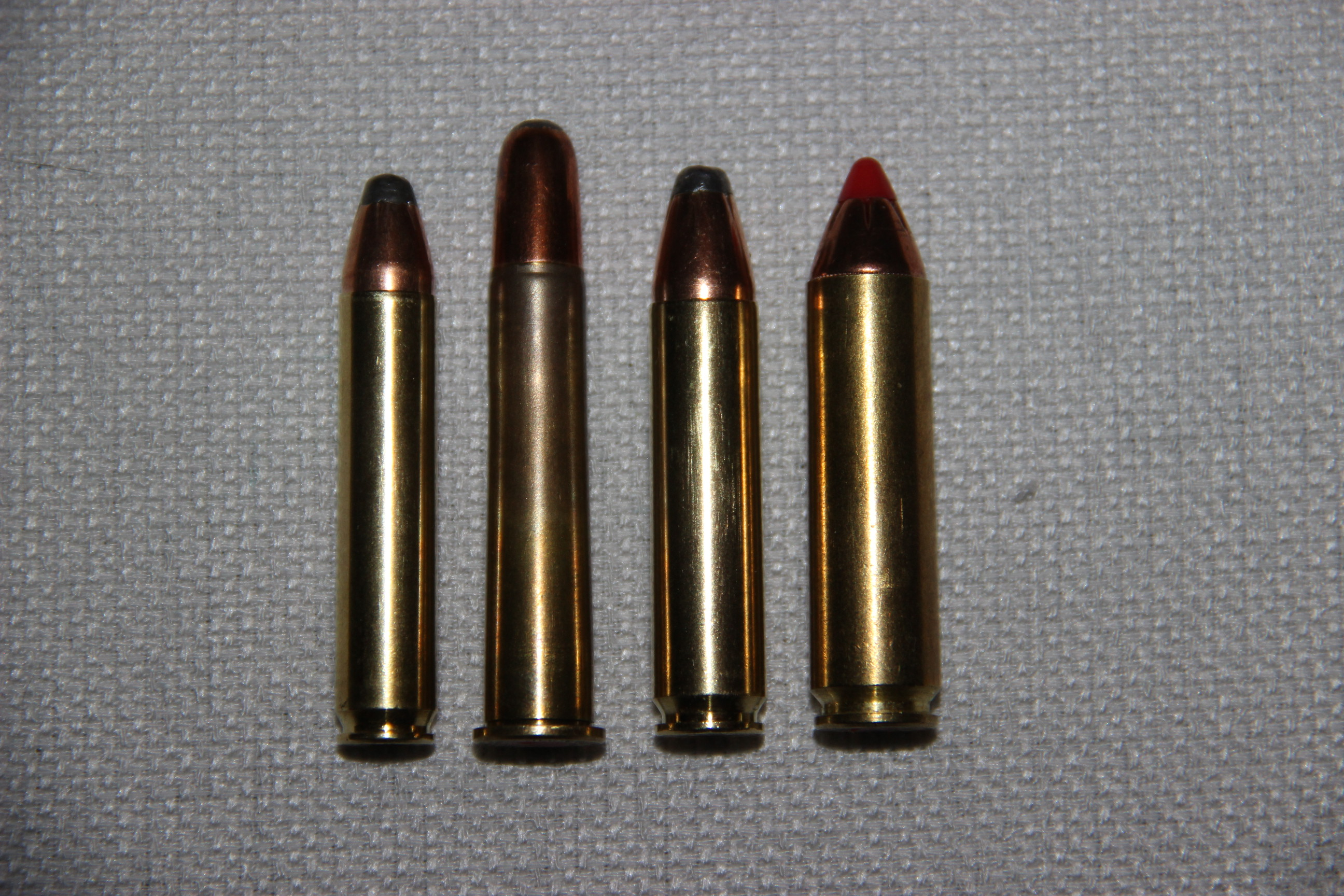
- Comparison of some straight-wall, left to right: .350 Legend, .360 Buckhammer, .400 Legend, .450 Bushmaster
- Type: Rifle
- Place of origin: United States

Production history
- Designer: Remington
- Designed: 2022
- Manufacturer: Remington
- Produced: 2023–present

Specifications
- Parent case: .30-30 Winchester
- Case type: Rimmed, straight
- Bullet diameter: .358 in (9.1 mm)
- Land diameter: .349 in (8.9 mm)
- Neck diameter: .3798 in (9.65 mm)
- Base diameter: .4195 in (10.66 mm)
- Rim diameter: .506 in (12.9 mm)
- Rim thickness: .048 in (1.2 mm)
- Case length: 1.80 in (46 mm)
- Overall length: 2.35 to 2.5 in (59.69 mm to 63.5 mm)
- Rifling twist: 1 in 12 in (300 mm)
- Maximum pressure (SAAMI): 50,000 psi (340 MPa)

Ballistic performance
| Bullet mass/type | Velocity | Energy |
|---|---|---|
| 180 gr (12 g) Remington Core-Lokt SP | 2,400 ft/s (730 m/s) | 2,302 ft⋅lbf (3,121 J) |
| 200 gr (13 g) Remington Core-Lokt SP | 2,200 ft/s (670 m/s) | 2,149 ft⋅lbf (2,914 J) |
- Test barrel length: 20 in Source: SAAMI

The .360 Buckhammer, also called 360 BHMR (9.1×46mmR), is a SAAMI-standardized straight-walled rifle cartridge developed by Remington Arms Company. The cartridge was designed for use in American states that have specific regulations for deer hunting with straight-walled centerfire cartridges.

== History ==
At the 2023 SHOT Show in Las Vegas, Nevada, the .360 Buckhammer cartridge was introduced by Remington Arms. The Sporting Arms and Ammunition Manufacturers' Institute (SAAMI), the U.S. firearms and ammunition industry's technical standards-setting organization, announced the acceptance of the new cartridge and chamber standard on January 15, 2023.

== Design ==
The .360 Buckhammer cartridge offered a flatter trajectory and better terminal performance over many contemporary straight-wall cartridges while remaining compliant in most applicable US states.

.360 Buckhammer's parent case is the .30-30 Winchester, necked-up to use the same .358-caliber bullets as the .35 Remington and .35 Whelen.

== Technical Drawing ==
=== State legislation ===
.360 Buckhammer also addresses a rapidly growing market segment known as "straight-wall-cartridge-compliant" deer-hunting states. A growing number of US states that previously restricted deer hunting to limited-range slug guns or muzzle-loading firearms are now allowing rifles chambered in straight-walled centerfire cartridges with a maximum case length of 1.8 in (46 mm).

== See also ==
- List of rifle cartridges
- .22 ARC
- 30-30 Winchester
- .350 Legend
- .35 Remington
- .35 Whelen
- .358 Winchester
- .375 Winchester
- .400 Legend
- .401 Winchester Self-Loading
- .450 Bushmaster
