= .308 Marlin Express =

Firearm cartridge

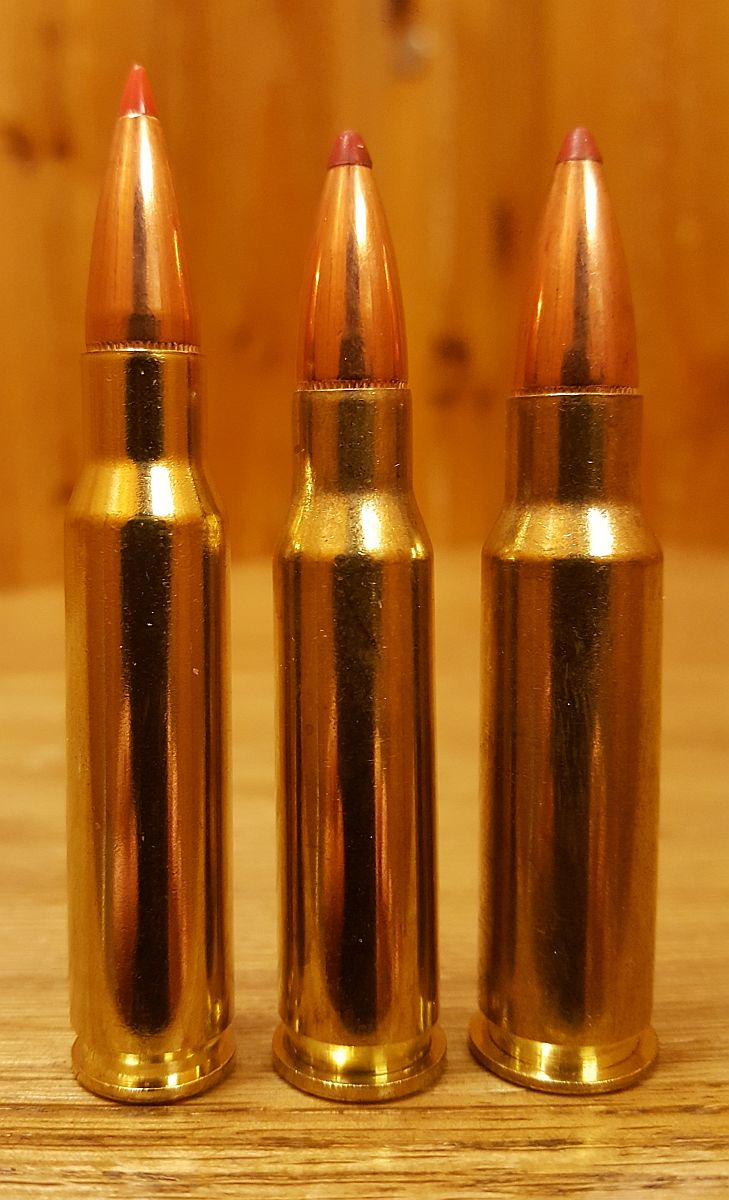
- .308 Winchester (left), with .308 Marlin Express (center), and .338 Marlin Express (right)
- Type: Rifle
- Place of origin: USA

Production history
- Designer: Marlin / Hornady
- Designed: 2007
- Manufacturer: Hornady
- Produced: 2007–present

Specifications
- Parent case: .307 Winchester
- Case type: Semi-rimmed, bottleneck
- Bullet diameter: .308 in (7.8 mm)
- Neck diameter: .344 in (8.7 mm)
- Shoulder diameter: .454 in (11.5 mm)
- Base diameter: .470 in (11.9 mm)
- Rim diameter: .508 in (12.9 mm)
- Rim thickness: .063 in (1.6 mm)
- Case length: 1.910 in (48.5 mm)
- Overall length: 2.600 in (66.0 mm)
- Primer type: Large rifle
- Maximum pressure (SAAMI): 47,500 psi (328 MPa)

Ballistic performance
Bullet mass/type	Velocity	Energy
140 gr (9 g) MonoFlex Tip (Hornady Expanding)	2,800 ft/s (850 m/s)	2,437 ft⋅lbf (3,304 J)
160 gr (10 g) FTX (Hornady Flex Tip Expanding)	2,660 ft/s (810 m/s)	2,513 ft⋅lbf (3,407 J)
- Test barrel length: 24 inch Source(s): 308 Marlin Express LEVERevolution at Hornady web site and C.I.P Data

The .308 Marlin Express is a cartridge developed in 2007 by Marlin Firearms and Hornady. It is based on the .307 Winchester with a goal to duplicate .308 Winchester performance. The cartridge uses a slightly shorter, semi-rimmed case similar to that of the .220 Swift to function in lever-action rifles. As introduced in Hornady's LEVERevolution line of cartridges, it is the highest velocity production cartridge designed for lever action rifles with tubular magazines. It is chambered in Marlin's Model 308MX and 308MXLR rifles using the Marlin Model 336 action.

== Comparison ==
The .308 Marlin Express was designed to produce performance similar to the .308 Winchester. This would give lever-action hunters improved performance over their .30-30 Winchester rounds. The table below shows how the rounds compare. Note that reloading data for 160-grain (10 g) bullets for some of the cartridges is not available. This round was designed with an elastomer tip, so that the .308 designed would be safe for the tubular magazine of lever action rifles. This softer tip eliminates the hazards of stacking pointed rounds end to end in a tubular magazine.

.308 Marlin Express comparison
Cartridge	Mass	Muzzle velocity	Muzzle energy
.308 Marlin Express	160 grains (10 g)	2,660 ft/s (810 m/s)	2,513 ft⋅lbf (3,407 N⋅m)
.30-30 Winchester	160 grains (10 g)	2,300 ft/s (700 m/s)	1,880 ft⋅lbf (2,550 N⋅m)
.307 Winchester	150 grains (9.7 g)	2,693 ft/s (821 m/s)	2,416 ft⋅lbf (3,276 N⋅m)
.307 Winchester	160 grains (10 g)	2,675 ft/s (815 m/s)	2,540 ft⋅lbf (3,440 N⋅m)
.307 Winchester	170 grains (11 g)	2,570 ft/s (780 m/s)	2,494 ft⋅lbf (3,381 N⋅m)
.308 Winchester	150 grains (9.7 g)	2,809 ft/s (856 m/s)	2,629 ft⋅lbf (3,564 N⋅m)
.308 Winchester	160 grains (10 g)	2,770 ft/s (840 m/s)	2,720 ft⋅lbf (3,690 N⋅m)
.308 Winchester	168 grains (10.9 g)	2,712 ft/s (827 m/s)	2,744 ft⋅lbf (3,720 N⋅m)
.300 Savage	150 grains (9.7 g)	2,765 ft/s (843 m/s)	2,547 ft⋅lbf (3,453 N⋅m)
.300 Savage	160 grains (10 g)	2,505 ft/s (764 m/s)	2,230 ft⋅lbf (3,020 N⋅m)
.300 Savage	170 grains (11 g)	2,676 ft/s (816 m/s)	2,624 ft⋅lbf (3,558 N⋅m)

== Ammunition availability ==
As of 2010, Hornady and Remington remain the only two manufacturers of loaded ammunition in .308 Marlin Express.

== See also ==
- .308 Winchester
- .307 Winchester
- .300 Savage
- .30-30 Winchester
- .338 Marlin Express
- Table of handgun and rifle cartridges

== Sources ==
- The Marlin Express by Rick Hacker in Guns&Ammo
- .308 Marlin Express by Chuck Hawks (subscription required)
- 308 Marlin Express Reload Data by Hornady
