= .400 Legend =

Hunting cartridge by Winchester Repeating Arms

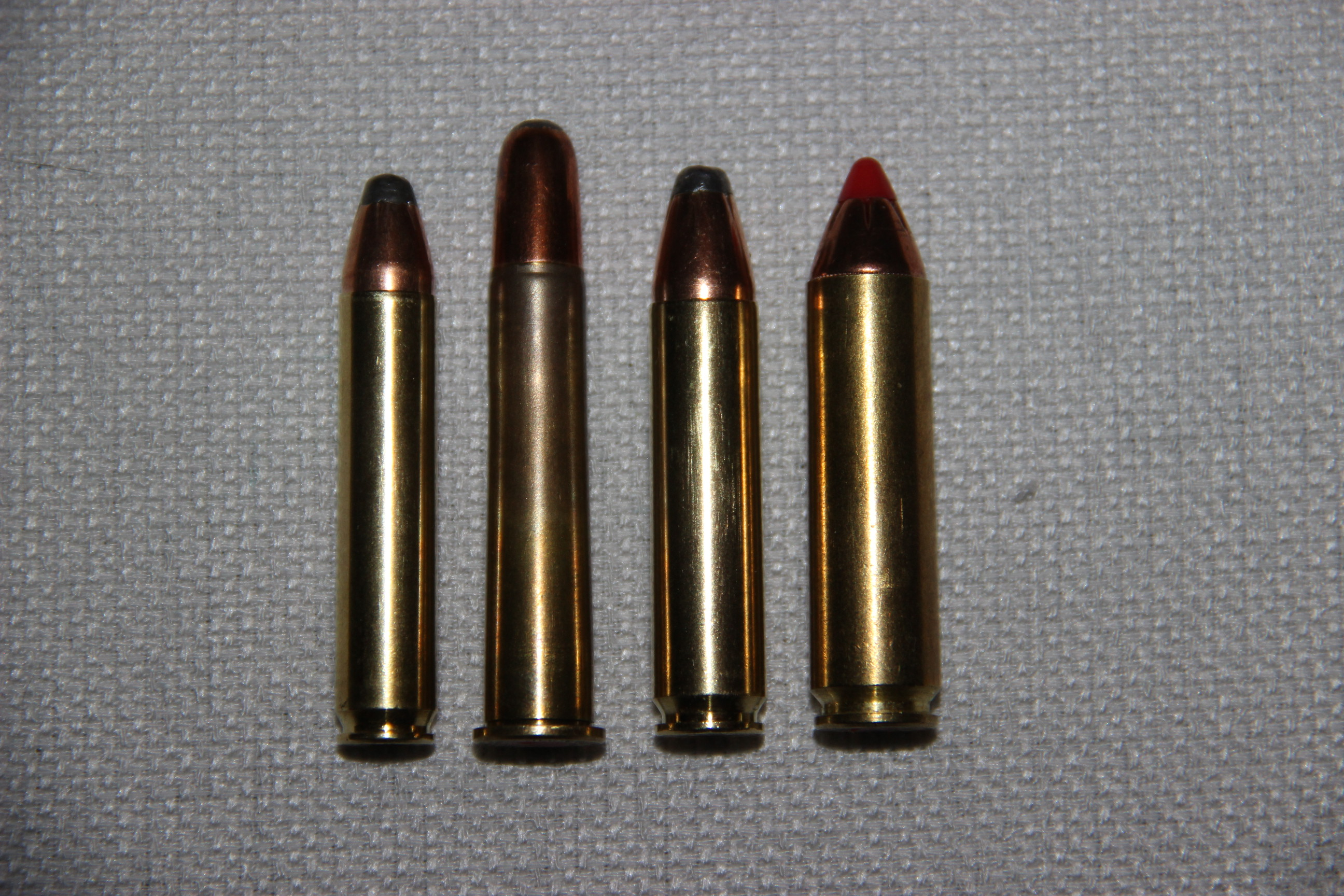
- Comparison of some straight-wall, left to right: .350 Legend, .360 Buckhammer, .400 Legend, .450 Bushmaster
- Type: Rifle
- Place of origin: United States

Production history
- Designer: Winchester Ammunition
- Designed: 2023
- Manufacturer: Winchester Ammunition
- Produced: 2023–present

Specifications
- Case type: Rebated, straight
- Bullet diameter: .4005–.0030 in (10.173–0.076 mm)
- Land diameter: .390 in (9.9 mm)
- Neck diameter: .4267 in (10.84 mm)
- Base diameter: .440 in (11.2 mm)
- Rim diameter: .422 in (10.7 mm)
- Rim thickness: .049 in (1.2 mm)
- Case length: 1.65 in (42 mm)
- Overall length: 2.26 in (57 mm)
- Rifling twist: 1 in 16 in (410 mm)
- Primer type: Small Rifle
- Maximum pressure (SAAMI): 45,000 psi (310 MPa)

Ballistic performance
Bullet mass/type	Velocity	Energy
215 gr (14 g) Winchester Power Point	2,250 ft/s (690 m/s)	2,416 ft⋅lbf (3,276 J)

The .400 Legend, also called 400 LGND (10×42mmRB), is a SAAMI-standardized straight-walled intermediate rifle cartridge developed by Winchester Repeating Arms. The cartridge was designed for use in American states that have specific regulations for deer hunting with straight-walled centerfire cartridges. It is designed for deer hunting out to a maximum effective range of 300 yards (270 m).

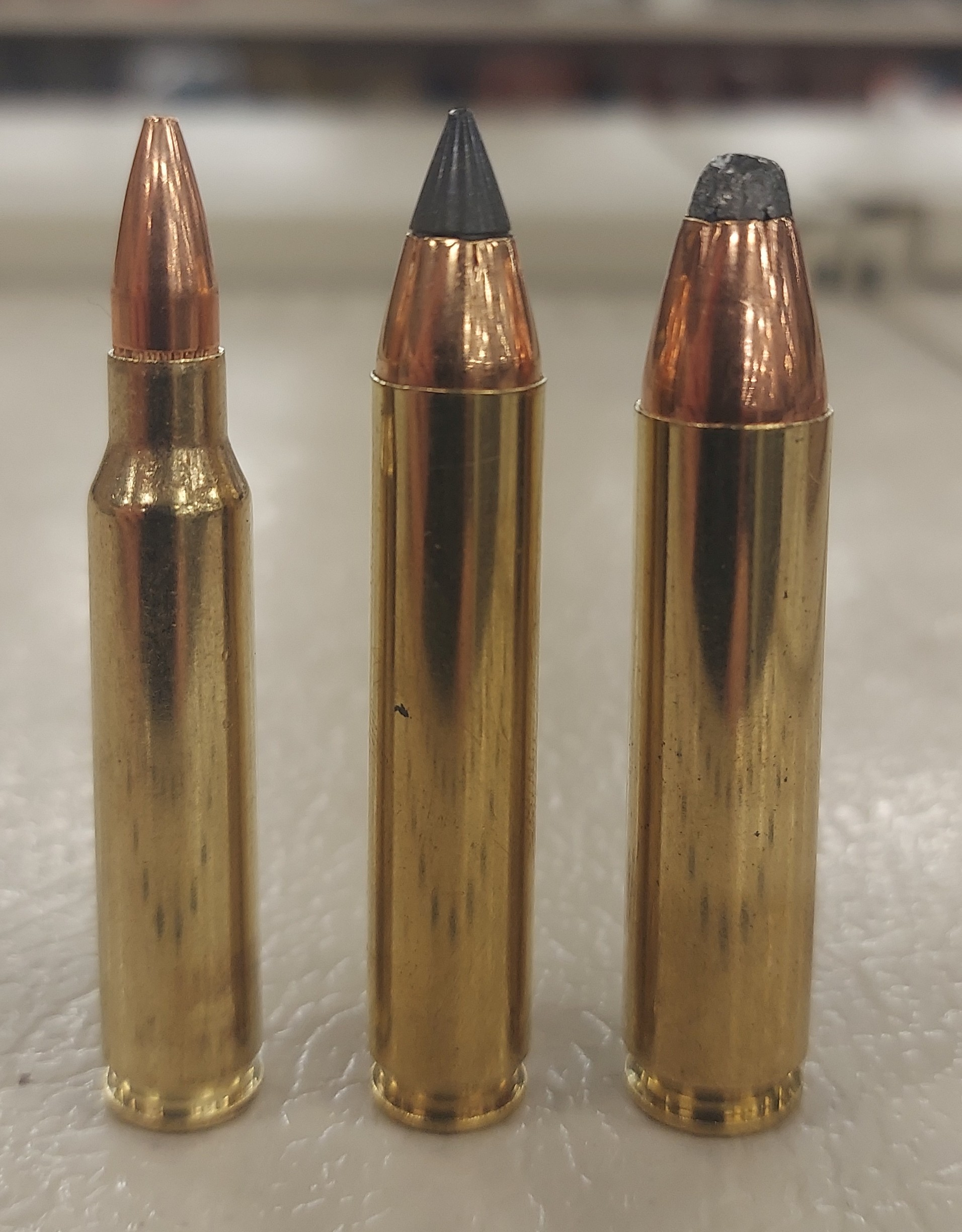
From left: .223 Remington, .350 Legend, .400 Legend

== Overview ==
The .400 Legend is suitable for use in AR-15 type semiautomatic rifles.

== History ==
On April 14, 2023, Winchester Ammunition announced the .400 Legend. The Sporting Arms and Ammunition Manufacturers' Institute (SAAMI), the U.S. firearms and ammunition industry's technical standards-setting organization, announced the acceptance of the new cartridge and chamber standard on January 15, 2023.

The .400 Legend was preceded by the Winchester Model 1910 .401 Winchester Self-Loading cartridge, and in 2014 by the .400 AR wildcat cartridge designed for the AR-15–style rifle.

== Technical Drawing ==
Link to SAAMI Cartridge and chamber drawings.

== Usage ==
The .400 Legend cartridge is engineered for deer hunters requiring a modern straight-walled cartridge that is more powerful and has greater effective range than the .350 Legend.

=== State legislation ===
.400 Legend also addresses a rapidly growing market segment known as "straight-wall-cartridge-compliant" deer-hunting states. A growing number of states that previously restricted deer hunting to limited-range slug guns or muzzleloading firearms are now allowing rifles chambered in straight-walled centerfire cartridges.

The .400 Legend was designed for deer hunting in states that have specific regulations requiring straight-walled cartridges for use on deer, such as Ohio, Iowa (formerly), and the Southern Lower Peninsula region of Michigan. Illinois also allows straight-walled cartridges if used with a pistol or a single-shot rifle. The pistol must be a centerfire revolver or centerfire single-shot handgun of .30 inches (7.6 mm) caliber or larger with a minimum barrel length of 4 inches (100 mm) inches. Single-shot rifles in those specified calibers became legal on January 1, 2023. Before the 2025–26 hunting season, Indiana had similar but not identical cartridge restrictions on public land.

Ohio's Deer Hunting Regulations allow the use of a straight-walled rifle cartridge with a minimum caliber of .357 inches (9.1 mm).

Before the 2025–26 hunting season, Indiana regulations actually did not mandate a straight-walled cartridge. When hunting on private land, virtually all centerfire cartridges with a bullet diameter of at least .243 in (6.2 mm) were legal. On public land, state regulations mandated minimum and maximum case lengths of 1.16 inches (29 mm) and 1.8 inches (46 mm) respectively, plus a minimum bullet diameter of .357 in (9.1 mm), but did not mandate a specific case shape. While many straight-walled cartridges met Indiana requirements, some bottlenecked cartridges also did so, with a notable example being the .458 SOCOM. Starting with the 2025–26 season, all centerfire rifle cartridges, regardless of case shape, with bullet diameters of 5.56 mm (0.219 in) or greater are legal on both private and public land. Also, almost all centerfire handgun cartridges, again regardless of case shape, are now legal on both public and private land as long as they have a case length of at least 1.16 in and a bullet diameter of at least 0.243 in. The 10mm Auto and .40 S&W do not meet the case length requirement, but are explicitly stated as also being legal.

Iowa was formerly a straight-wall state for deer hunting by rifle, but state regulations no longer mandate a specific case shape. All centerfire rifle and handgun cartridges with (1) a bullet diameter of at least 0.350 in and no larger than .500 in and (2) a published or calculated muzzle energy of at least 500 foot-pounds are now legal.

== See also ==
- 10 mm caliber
- List of rebated rim cartridges
- List of rifle cartridges
- .30-30 Winchester
- .35 Remington
- .350 Legend
- .360 Buckhammer
- .401 Winchester Self-Loading
- .444 Marlin
- .450 Bushmaster
- List of AR platform cartridges
