= .338 Federal =

Rifle cartridge

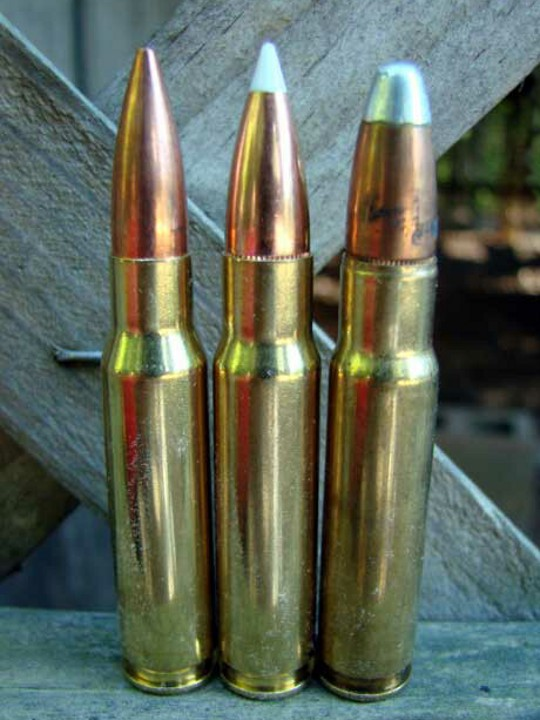
- .338 Federal between .308 Winchester (left) and .358 Winchester (right)
- Type: Rifle
- Place of origin: United States

Production history
- Designer: Federal Cartridge / Sako
- Manufacturer: Federal Cartridge
- Produced: 2006

Specifications
- Parent case: .308 Winchester
- Case type: Rimless, bottleneck
- Bullet diameter: .338 in (8.6 mm)
- Neck diameter: .369 in (9.4 mm)
- Shoulder diameter: .454 in (11.5 mm)
- Base diameter: .470 in (11.9 mm)
- Rim diameter: .473 in (12.0 mm)
- Rim thickness: .049 in (1.2 mm)
- Case length: 2.01 in (51 mm)
- Overall length: 2.75 in (70 mm)
- Primer type: Large rifle
- Maximum pressure: 62,000 psi

Ballistic performance
Bullet mass/type	Velocity	Energy
180 gr (12 g) AccuBond	2,830 ft/s (860 m/s)	3,200 ft⋅lbf (4,300 J)
185 gr (12 g) Triple Shock	2,750 ft/s (840 m/s)	3,105 ft⋅lbf (4,210 J)
210 gr (14 g) AccuBond	2,630 ft/s (800 m/s)	3,225 ft⋅lbf (4,373 J)
- Test barrel length: 24" Pac-Nor; Sources: Nosler Load Data, Hodgdon Reloading Data Center

The .338 Federal is a rifle cartridge based on the .308 Winchester case necked up to .33 caliber. It was created by Federal Cartridge and SAKO in 2006 and intended as a big-game cartridge with reasonable recoil for lightweight rifles. .338 Federal can fit SR-25 pattern magazines but requires some modification for reliability

== Comparison ==
The .338 Federal was designed by Federal Ammunition and it's a SAAMI standardized cartridge that was released in 2006. In the table below is a comparison between the .338 Federal and the older .358 Winchester, another cartridge based on the .308 Winchester.

.338 Federal Performance Comparison
Cartridge	Bullet Weight		Muzzle velocity		Muzzle energy		Load (Note: Load values specify typical powder weight for this level of performance.)		Recoil in 8 lb (3.6 kg) rifle	
Cartridge	gr	g	ft/s	m/s	ft·lbf	J	gr	g	ft·lbf	J
.338 Federal	210	14	2,630	800	3,225	4,373	47	3.0	23.42	31.75
.338 Federal	180	12	2,830	860	3,200	4,300	47	3.0	21.84	29.61
.358 Win	200	13	2,490	760	2,753	3,733	49	3.2	20.07	27.21

== See also ==
- .338 Lapua Magnum
- .338 Marlin Express
- .338 Ruger Compact Magnum
- .338 Remington Ultra Magnum
- .338 Winchester Magnum
- 8 mm caliber
- List of rifle cartridges
- Table of handgun and rifle cartridges
- sectional density
