= .450 Bushmaster =

Rifle cartridge

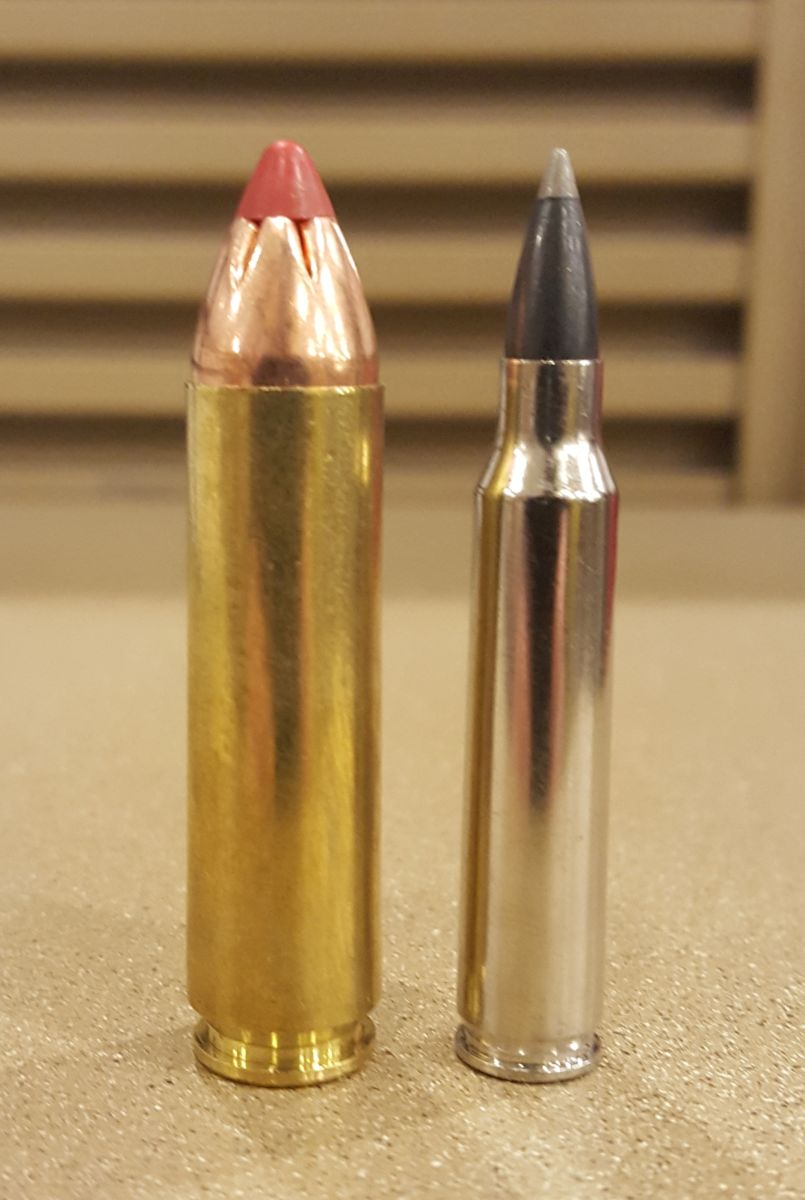
- .450 Bushmaster (left), .223 Remington (right)
- Type: Rifle
- Place of origin: United States

Production history
- Designer: LeMAG Firearms LLC
- Designed: 2007
- Manufacturer: Bushmaster; Hornady
- Produced: 2009–present

Specifications
- Parent case: .284 Winchester
- Case type: Rebated, straight
- Bullet diameter: .4520 in (11.48 mm)
- Land diameter: .4420 in (11.23 mm)
- Neck diameter: .4800 in (12.19 mm)
- Base diameter: .5000 in (12.70 mm)
- Rim diameter: .4730 in (12.01 mm)
- Rim thickness: .0540 in (1.37 mm)
- Case length: 1.700 in (43.2 mm)
- Overall length: 2.260 in (57.4 mm)
- Case capacity: 59.5 gr H_{2}O (3.86 cm^{3})
- Maximum pressure (SAAMI): 38,500 psi (265 MPa)

Ballistic performance
Bullet mass/type	Velocity	Energy
250 gr (16 g) SST	675 m/s (2,210 ft/s)	3,694 J (2,725 ft⋅lbf)
260 gr (17 g) AccuTip	665 m/s (2,180 ft/s)	3,727 J (2,749 ft⋅lbf)
250 gr (16 g) FTX Hornady BLACK	671 m/s (2,200 ft/s)	3,648 J (2,691 ft⋅lbf)
- Test barrel length: 20 in (508 mm); Source: Lynx Defense

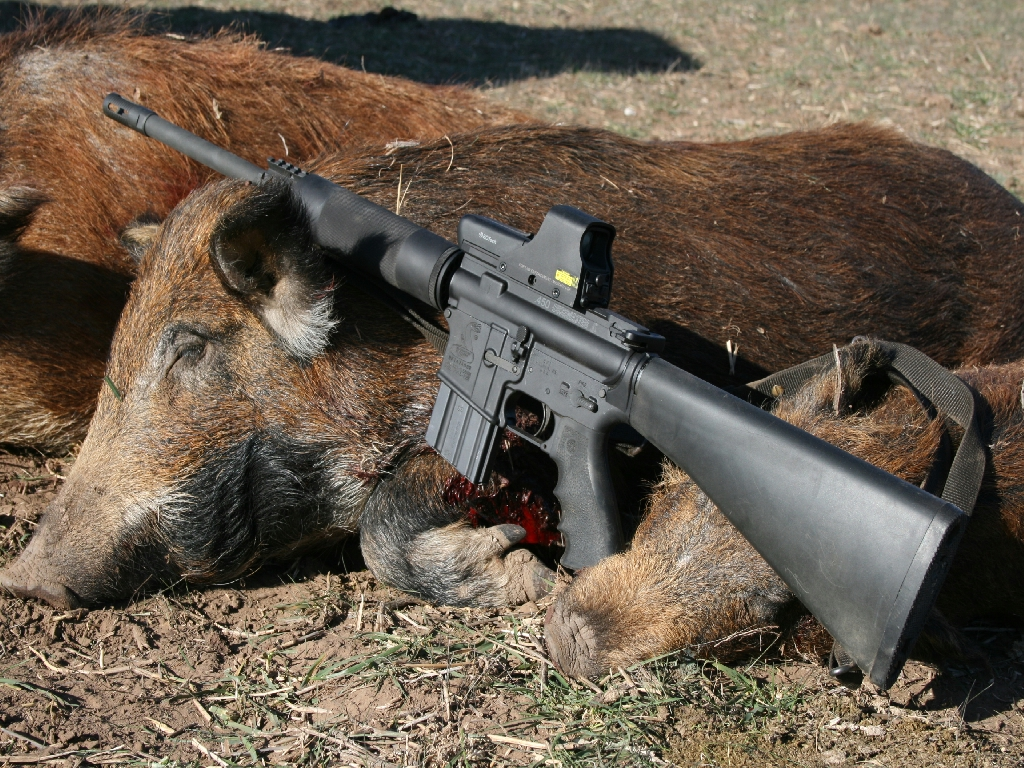
The .450 Bushmaster was developed for big game hunting with modern rifles.

The .450 Bushmaster (11.48x43mmRB) is a rifle cartridge developed by Tim LeGendre of LeMag Firearms, and licensed to Bushmaster Firearms International. The .450 Bushmaster is designed to be used in standard M16, M4, and AR-15 rifle lower receivers, using modified magazines and upper receiver assemblies.

== History ==
The .450 Bushmaster is descended from the Thumper concept popularized by gun writer Jeff Cooper. Cooper was dissatisfied with the small-diameter bullet 5.56×45mm NATO (.223 Remington) of the AR-15, and envisioned a need for a large bore (.44 cal or greater) cartridge in a semi-automatic rifle to provide one-shot kills on big-game animals at 250 yards. Inspired by this, LeGendre developed his .45 Professional cartridge in the early 2000's and built and delivered an AR-10 in .45 Professional to Cooper.

After being sold the .45 Professional concept in 2007, Bushmaster requested the ammunition manufacturer Hornady to produce the .45 Professional cartridge for this project, but Hornady wanted to shorten the cartridge case and overall length to accommodate their 0.452 in. 250-grain pointed SST flex-tip bullet; plus .452 is a very common bullet size, being used by the .45 Colt, .45 ACP, .454 Casull, & .460 S&W Magnum, and the 250-grain SST was already a popular bullet for the .454 & .460. Bushmaster and LeGendre approved the change from a 1.772 in. (45 mm) case and 2.362 in. (60 mm) overall length (OAL) to the now standard 1.700 in. (43.18 mm) case and 2.260 in. (57.40 mm) OAL. This permitted operation in the more abundant and popular AR-15 platform, versus the larger less common AR-10 platform. Also, a name change to ".450 Bushmaster" was approved.

In 2006 the rights to the .450 Bushmaster were sold to Cerberus Capital Management, which eventually became part of Freedom Group, a company that also owned Remington Arms, Marlin Firearms, Advanced Armament Corporation (AAC) and others. Following Remington's bankruptcy in 2020 due to multiple lawsuits, the company's assets were sold off, with the .450 Bushmaster and its parent company being purchased by Nevada based Franklin Armory in 2021, best known for making the Binary Fire Control System.

== Loadings and ballistics ==
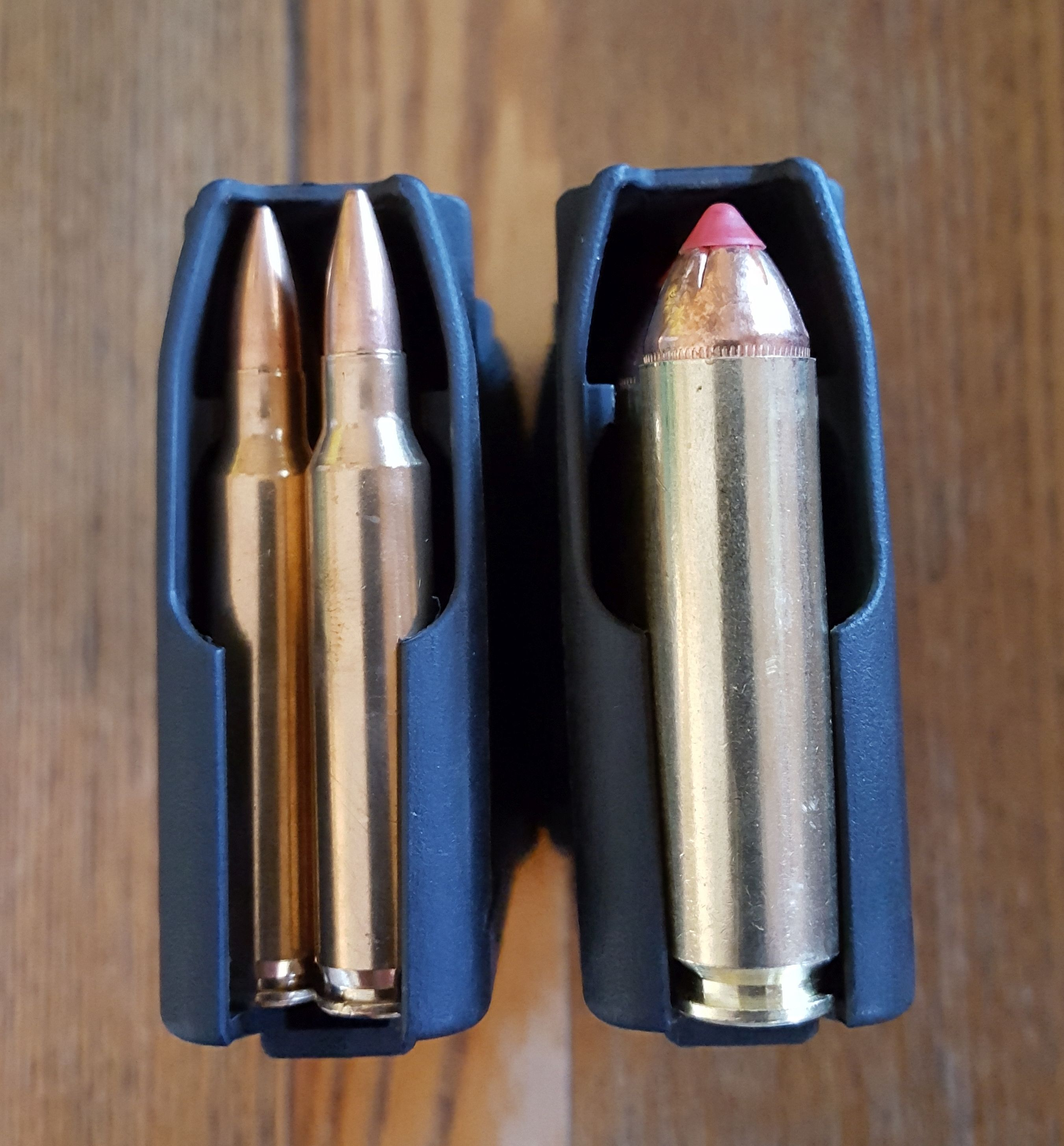
.450 Bushmaster single-stacks in magazines, unlike .223, which sits in two staggered columns

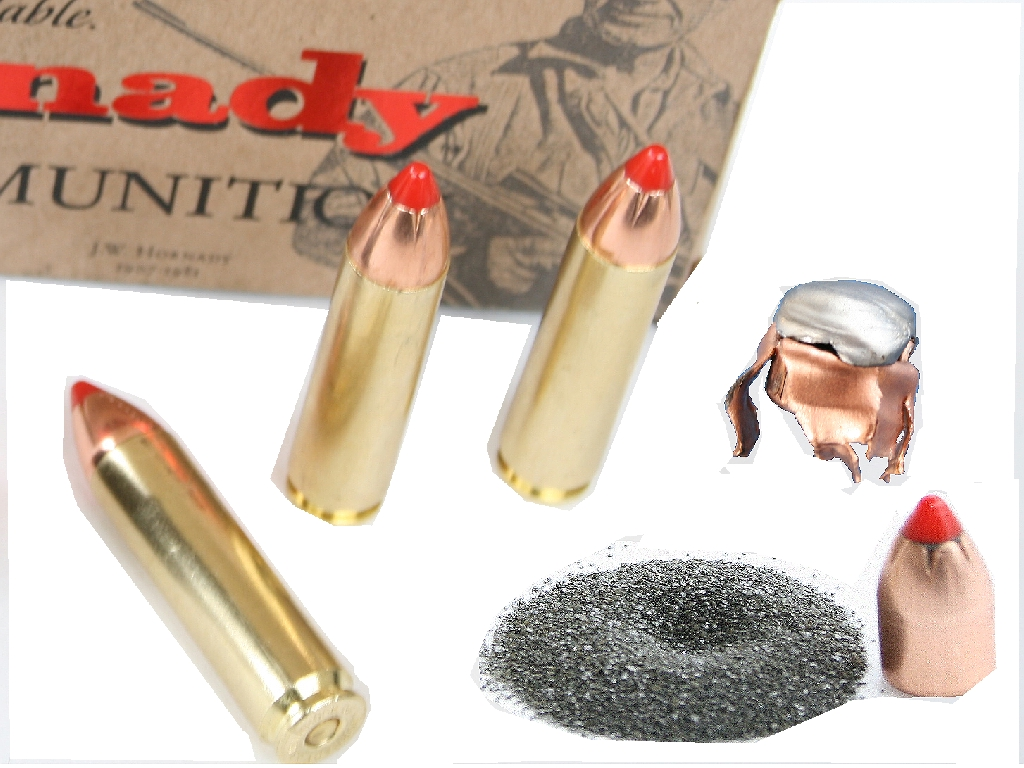
.450 Bushmaster cartridges and components

The .450 Bushmaster makes use of .452 in. bullets because the lower impact velocities and energies would not adequately expand the heavier jacketed .458 in. bullets. The cartridge is chambered in bolt-action rifles by Ruger, Savage, Mossberg, and Remington. Ruger also chambers their Ruger No. 1 single shot rifle, and their AR-556 MPR rifle in .450, and Franklin Armory's XO-26 BFS-III equipped AR-15 pistol is chambered in .450. As of 2022, Bushmaster Firearms is once again manufacturing rifles chambered in the .450 Bushmaster

The cartridge fits single-stacked in a standard AR-15 magazine with a single-stack follower. A 10-round AR-15 magazine body yields a four-round magazine, a 20-round AR-15 magazine body yields a five- to seven-round magazine, and a 30-round body yields a nine-round magazine. As of 2025 Ammo Inc., Federal, Hornady, Remington, and Winchester manufacture ammunition for the rifle, and Starline manufactures empty brass for handloading.

== See also ==
- List of AR platform cartridges
- List of rebated rim cartridges
- List of rifle cartridges
- Table of handgun and rifle cartridges
- 11 mm caliber
- .350 Legend
- .360 Buckhammer
- .400 Legend
- .444 Marlin
- .45-70
- .458 SOCOM
- .45 Raptor
- .460 S&W Magnum
- .50 Beowulf
- 12.7×55mm STs-130
