= .350 Legend =

Hunting cartridge by Winchester Repeating Arms

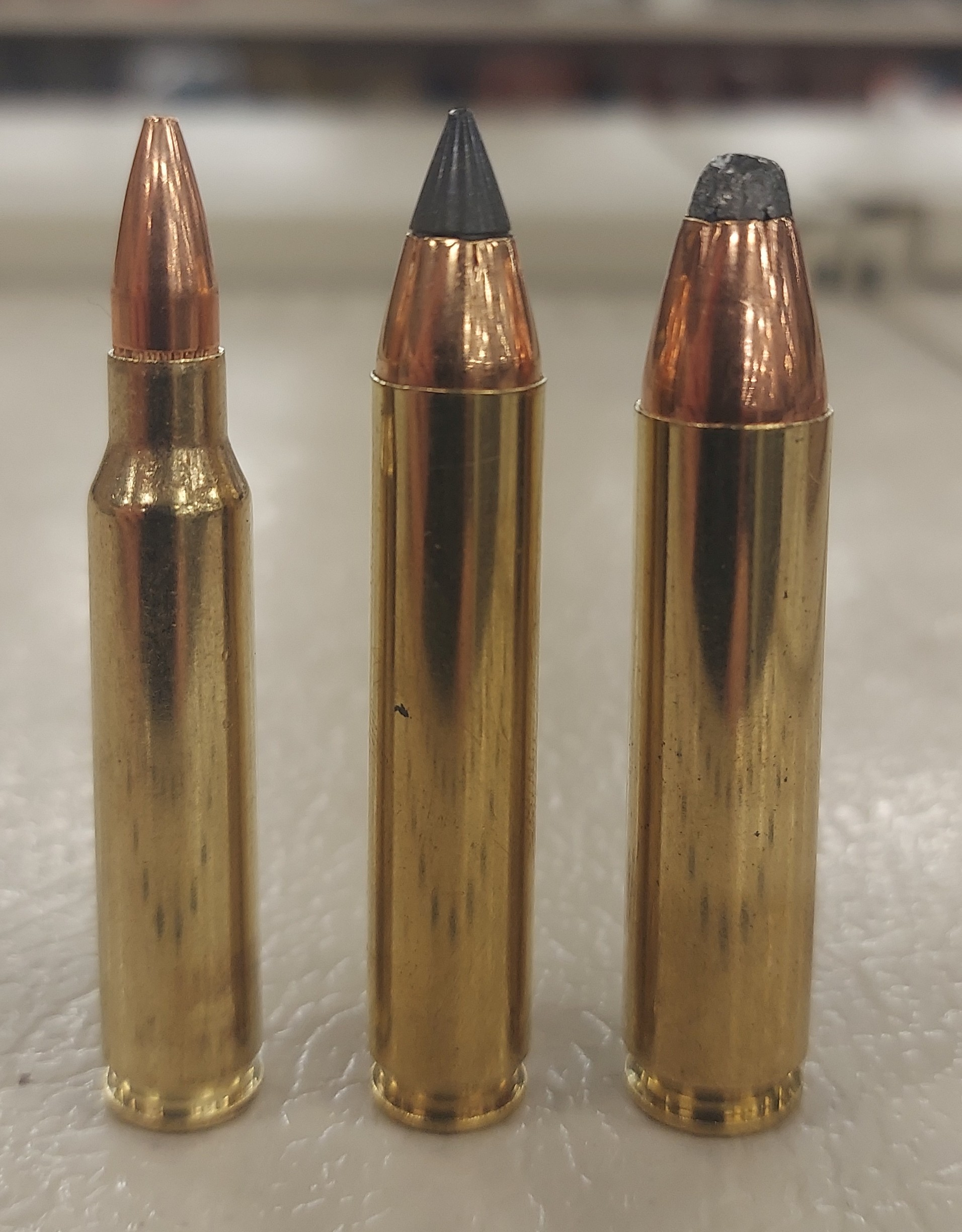
- Center, with .223 Remington (left) and .400 Legend (right)
- Type: Rifle, revolver
- Place of origin: United States

Production history
- Designer: Winchester Ammunition
- Designed: 2019
- Manufacturer: Winchester Ammunition
- Produced: 2019–present

Specifications
- Case type: Rebated, straight
- Bullet diameter: .3570–.0030 in (9.068–0.076 mm)
- Land diameter: .3460 in (8.79 mm)
- Neck diameter: .378 in (9.6 mm)
- Base diameter: .390 in (9.9 mm)
- Rim diameter: .378 in (9.6 mm)
- Rim thickness: .045 in (1.1 mm)
- Case length: 1.71 in (43 mm)
- Overall length: 2.25 in (57 mm)
- Case capacity: 36.5 grains (water)
- Rifling twist: 1 in 16 in (410 mm)
- Primer type: Small rifle
- Maximum pressure (SAAMI): 55,000 psi (380 MPa)

Ballistic performance
Bullet mass/type	Velocity	Energy
160 gr (10 g) Federal Fusion	2,300 ft/s (700 m/s)	1,879 ft⋅lbf (2,548 J)
165 gr (11 g) Hornady FTX	2,200 ft/s (670 m/s)	1,773 ft⋅lbf (2,404 J)
180 gr (12 g) Winchester	2,100 ft/s (640 m/s)	1,762 ft⋅lbf (2,389 J)
- Test barrel length: 20 in Source: SAAMI

The .350 Legend, also called 350 LGND (9×43mmRB), is a SAAMI-standardized straight-walled intermediate rifle cartridge developed by Winchester Repeating Arms. The cartridge was designed for use in American states that have specific regulations for deer hunting with straight-walled centerfire cartridges. At the cartridge's introduction, Winchester claimed that the .350 Legend was the fastest production straight-walled hunting cartridge in the world, although some .450 Bushmaster, .444 Marlin, and .458 Winchester Magnum loads are faster and have much more energy, and the .350 Legend would be surpassed in 2023 by the .360 Buckhammer. It is designed for deer hunting out to a maximum effective range of 250 yards (230 m).

== Overview ==
The .350 Legend shares many characteristics with the .223 Remington, such as an overall cartridge length of 2.26 inches (57 mm) and a rim diameter of .378 inches (9.6 mm).

== History ==
At the 2019 SHOT Show in Las Vegas, Nevada, the .350 Legend cartridge was introduced by Winchester Ammunition. It was the first new centerfire cartridge announced by Winchester since its 2004 introduction of the Winchester Super Short Magnum series. The Sporting Arms and Ammunition Manufacturers' Institute (SAAMI), the U.S. firearms and ammunition industry's technical standards-setting organization, announced the acceptance of the new cartridge and chamber standard on January 31, 2019.

== Design ==
The cartridge was developed to deliver enough energy to achieve lethal terminal effects on large deer out to 200 yd (180 m). The recoil is said to be less than a .243 Winchester. As of late 2024, Winchester offers six different loads for the cartridge: a 150 gr (9.7 g) Deer Season XP at 2,325 ft/s (709 m/s). a 180 gr (12 g) Power Point at 2,100 ft/s (640 m/s), a 160 gr (10 g) Defender designed for use in the AR-15 platform at 2,170 ft/s (660 m/s). a 145 gr (9.4 g) FMJ in the USA ammo line at 2,350 ft/s (720 m/s), a 150 gr (9.7 g) Copper Impact at 2,260 ft/s (690 m/s), and a Super Suppressed 255 gr (16.5 g) subsonic load at 1,060 ft/s (320 m/s). Several other companies, among them Barnes, Browning, Federal, Hornady, and Underwood, offer various loadings.

The cartridge offers a flatter trajectory with less recoil and better terminal performance over current straight-wall cartridges while remaining compliant in most applicable states.

The .350 Legend cartridge is designed to cycle in a variety of firearm platforms, and has been shown to operate in bolt-action rifles like the Winchester XPR.

.350 Legend has no parent case. However, .350 Legend uses the same 0.378 in (9.6 mm) nominal rim diameter as .223 Remington. The .350 Legend case is a new design that maximizes terminal performance while optimizing the ability to extract the cartridge from the chambers of a variety of firearms. The .350 Legend did not adapt a .223 Remington parent case in order to incorporate a slight body taper (for extraction), as well as additional shellcase length and case volume.

Winchester engineered .350 Legend hunting projectiles (such as the Extreme Point and Power-Point bullets) for use on big game out to 250 yd (230 m). These bullets were designed specifically to maximize .350 Legend cartridge performance.

== Usage ==
The .350 Legend cartridge is engineered for deer hunters requiring a modern straight-walled cartridge. It is capable of killing hogs, deer, black bears, and coyotes. With bullet weights ranging from 125 to 280 gr (8.1 to 18.1 g).

The ability to practice cheaply with low recoil, high velocity .35 caliber (9.1 mm) rounds legal for deer hunting opens the door for many new shooters whose recoil sensitivity precludes their use of cartridges such as .450 Bushmaster or 12 gauge slug guns.

=== State legislation ===
.350 Legend also addresses a rapidly growing market segment known as "straight-wall-cartridge-compliant" deer-hunting states. A growing number of states that previously restricted deer hunting to limited-range slug guns or muzzleloading firearms are now allowing rifles chambered in straight-walled centerfire cartridges.

The .350 Legend was designed for deer hunting in states that have specific regulations requiring straight-walled cartridges for use on deer, such as Ohio, Iowa (formerly), and the Southern Lower Peninsula region of Michigan. Illinois also allows straight-walled cartridges if used with a pistol or a single-shot rifle. The pistol must be a centerfire revolver or centerfire single-shot handgun of .30 caliber or larger with a minimum barrel length of 4 inches. Single-shot rifles in those specified calibers became legal on January 1, 2023. Before the 2025–26 hunting season, Indiana also had similar but not identical cartridge restrictions on public land.

Ohio's Deer Hunting Regulations allow the use of a straight-walled rifle cartridge with a minimum caliber of .357 inches (9.1 mm). The .350 Legend is only .355 inches (9.0 mm), two thousandths of an inch too small to satisfy Ohio's Deer Hunting Regulations as codified. All .350 Legend cartridges have bullets that measure between .354 and .355 in diameter, and barrels chambered in .350 Legend have a bore that is only .355 in diameter. After Winchester designed the cartridge for .355 bullets rather than using .357 or .358 bullets that would comply with Ohio's hunting regulations, they claimed in their SAAMI submission that the .350 Legend is ".357 - 0.0030" in diameter. As a result, published state hunting regulations specifically indicate that .350 Legend is permitted.

Before the 2025–26 hunting season, the Indiana Department of Natural Resources (Indiana DNR) website listed most cartridges, both bottlenecked and straight-walled, of at least .243" (6.2 mm) bullet diameter as allowed on private land. But when hunting on public lands in Indiana, the DNR cartridge specifications required cartridges with minimum and maximum case lengths of 1.16 inches (29 mm) and 1.8 inches (46 mm), respectively, and a minimum bullet diameter of .357 inches (9.1 mm). It was a common misconception that Indiana was a "straight-wall state" for public land deer hunting. Many straight-wall cartridges were and still are legal in Indiana, but they were not required, as some rounds with bottlenecked cases—wildcat rounds such as .358 Hoosier and .358 WSSM, as well as the commercial (though not SAAMI-standardized) .458 SOCOM—still met the state requirements. Starting with the 2025–26 season, all centerfire rifle cartridges, regardless of case shape, with bullet diameters of 5.56 mm (0.219 in) or greater are legal on both private and public land. Also, almost all centerfire handgun cartridges, again regardless of case shape, are now legal on both public and private land as long as they have a case length of at least 1.16 in and a bullet diameter of at least 0.243 in. The 10mm Auto and .40 S&W do not meet the case length requirement, but are explicitly stated as also being legal.

Iowa was formerly a straight-wall state for deer hunting by rifle, but that state's regulations no longer mandate a specific case shape. All centerfire rifle and handgun cartridges with (1) a bullet diameter of at least 0.350 in and no larger than .500 in and (2) a published or calculated muzzle energy of at least 500 foot-pounds are now legal.

== See also ==
- List of rebated rim cartridges
- 6×45mm
- 9x39mm
- .357 Remington Maximum
- .360 Buckhammer
- .400 Legend
- .450 Bushmaster
