= .307 Winchester =

Rifle cartridge

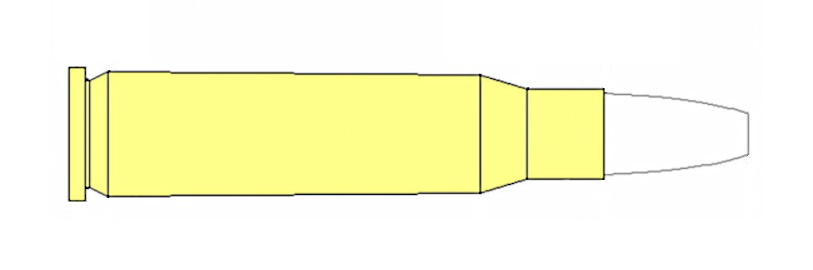
- Type: Rifle
- Place of origin: United States

Production history
- Designed: 1982
- Manufacturer: Winchester
- Produced: 1982–present

Specifications
- Parent case: .308 Winchester
- Case type: Rimmed, bottleneck
- Bullet diameter: .308 in (7.8 mm)
- Neck diameter: .344 in (8.7 mm)
- Shoulder diameter: .454 in (11.5 mm)
- Base diameter: .471 in (12.0 mm)
- Rim diameter: .506 in (12.9 mm)
- Rim thickness: .063 in (1.6 mm)
- Case length: 2.015 in (51.2 mm)
- Overall length: 2.560 in (65.0 mm)
- Maximum CUP: 52,000 CUP

Ballistic performance
Bullet mass/type	Velocity	Energy
180 gr (12 g) Super-X Power-Point	2,510 ft/s (770 m/s)	2,519 ft⋅lbf (3,415 J)

The .307 Winchester cartridge was introduced by Winchester in 1982 to meet the demand of .300 Savage performance in a lever-action rifle equipped with a tubular magazine. It is nearly dimensionally identical to the more common .308 Winchester cartridge, the only differences being a rimmed base and thicker case walls.

== Overview ==
The Winchester Big Bore Model 94 Angle Eject rifle was the only rifle produced to fire the cartridge, though competitor Marlin Firearms created some prototype model 336 rifles chambered in .307 Win. It is still commercially loaded today, but many handload to gain better performance and accuracy. Because of safety concerns owing to the rifle's tubular magazine, flat-nosed bullets are normally used.

== Specifications ==
180 gr (12 g) Super-X Power-Point bullet. Ballistic Coefficient: 0.251

Distance	Velocity	Energy	Short Trajectory	Long Trajectory
Muzzle	2,510 ft/s (770 m/s)	2,519 ft⋅lb (3,415 J)	-	-
100 yd (91 m)	2,179 ft/s (664 m/s)	1,898 ft⋅lb (2,573 J)	0.0 in	1.5 in
200 yd (180 m)	1,874 ft/s (571 m/s)	1,404 ft⋅lb (1,904 J)	-6.5 in	-3.6 in
300 yd (270 m)	1,599 ft/s (487 m/s)	1,022 ft⋅lb (1,386 J)	-22.9 in	-18.6 in
400 yd (370 m)	1,362 ft/s (415 m/s)	742 ft⋅lb (1,006 J)	-	-47.1 in

== Dimensions ==
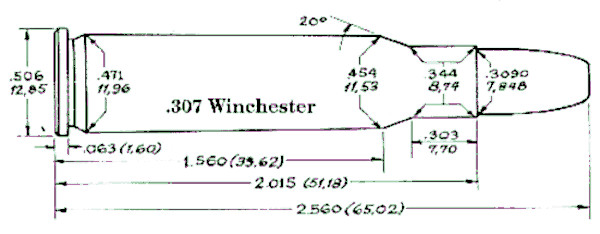

== Child cartridges ==
The .307 Winchester is the parent case for the .356 Winchester, and the proprietary round 6.5 JDJ #2.

It is also the parent case for the 7mm STE (Shooting Times Eastern).

== See also ==
- .308 Marlin Express
- List of rimmed cartridges
- List of rifle cartridges
- Table of handgun and rifle cartridges
