= .358 Winchester =

US rimless rifle cartridge

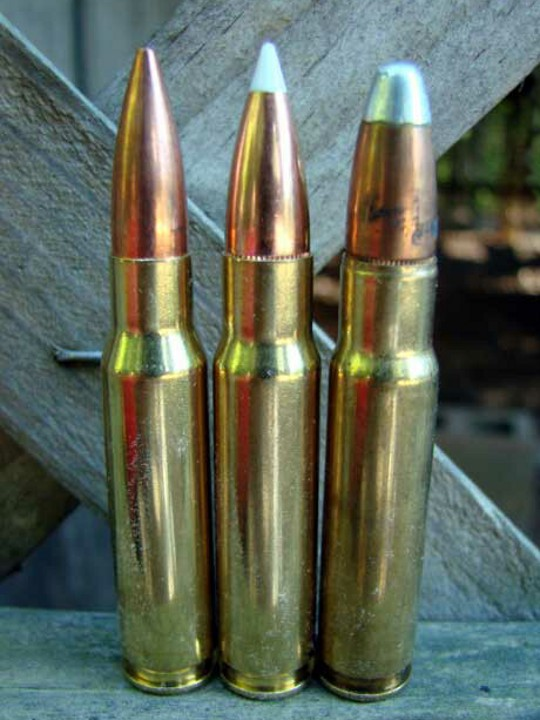
- From left: .308 Winchester, .338 Federal, .358 Winchester
- Type: Rifle
- Place of origin: United States

Production history
- Designer: Winchester
- Designed: 1955
- Manufacturer: Winchester
- Produced: 1955–present

Specifications
- Parent case: .308 Winchester
- Case type: Rimless, bottleneck
- Bullet diameter: .358 in (9.1 mm)
- Land diameter: .350 in (8.9 mm)
- Neck diameter: .388 in (9.9 mm)
- Shoulder diameter: .454 in (11.5 mm)
- Base diameter: .470 in (11.9 mm)
- Rim diameter: .473 in (12.0 mm)
- Rim thickness: .054 in (1.4 mm)
- Case length: 2.015 in (51.2 mm)
- Overall length: 2.780 in (70.6 mm)
- Rifling twist: 1-12
- Primer type: Large rifle
- Maximum CUP: 52,000 CUP

Ballistic performance
Bullet mass/type	Velocity	Energy
180 gr (12 g) SP	2,700 ft/s (820 m/s)	2,914 ft⋅lbf (3,951 J)
200 gr (13 g) SP	2,500 ft/s (760 m/s)	2,776 ft⋅lbf (3,764 J)
250 gr (16 g) SP	2,200 ft/s (670 m/s)	2,687 ft⋅lbf (3,643 J)
- Test barrel length: 24; Source: Hornady

The .358 Winchester / 9.1×51mm is a .35 caliber rifle cartridge based on a necked up .308 Winchester created by Winchester in 1955. The cartridge is also known in Europe as the 9.1×51mm.

== History ==
This cartridge came over 30 years later than the .35 Whelen which is based on the .30-06 Springfield. The relationship in performance between the .358 Win and the .35 Whelen is similar to that between the .308 Win and the .30-06. It created a round more powerful than the .35 Remington and .348 Winchester.

Popularity of this cartridge has dwindled but Browning Arms Company still produces the Browning BLR in .358 and numerous other rifles, such as the Winchester Model 70, Winchester Model 88, and the Savage Model 99 are available on the used gun rack; a number of companies (see availability below) still produce the ammunition. Noted web firearms author Chuck Hawks agrees with the Speer reloading manual that "the .358 Winchester is one of the best woods cartridges ever designed."

== Performance and Availability ==
The Winchester Super-X Silvertip consists of a 200-grain (13 g) pointed soft point bullet with an advertised muzzle velocity of 2,490 ft/s (760 m/s), and an advertised muzzle energy of 2,753 ft⋅lbf (3,733 J).

Cartridge cases can be formed from .308 cases.

== See also ==
- List of rifle cartridges
- 9 mm caliber
- .35 Remington
- .360 Buckhammer
- .35 Whelen
- Table of handgun and rifle cartridges
