= .444 Marlin =

Rifle cartridge

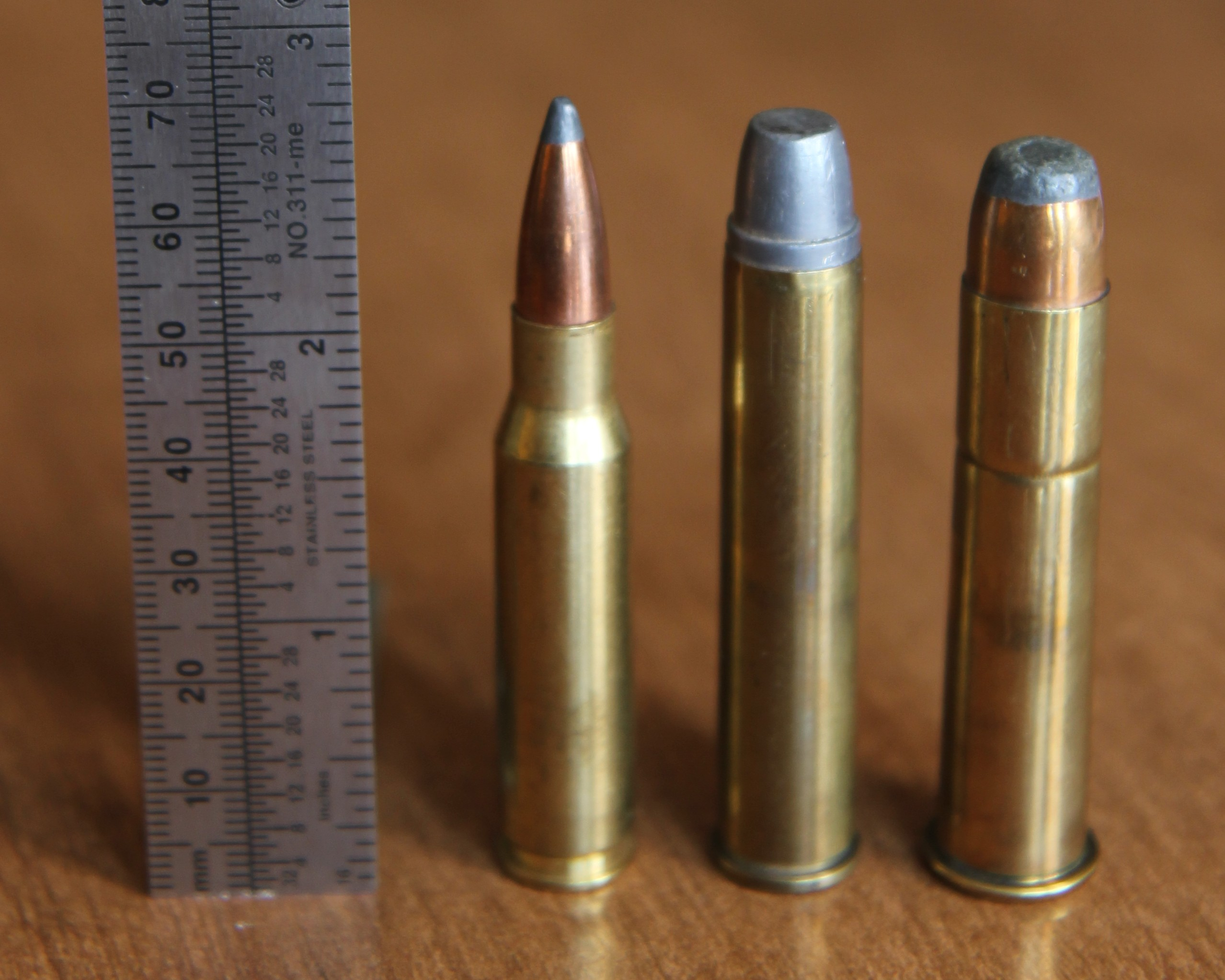
- .444 Marlin (center) with .308 Win (left) and .45-70 (right)
- Type: Rifle
- Place of origin: United States

Production history
- Designer: Marlin, Remington Arms
- Designed: 1964
- Manufacturer: Remington
- Produced: 1964–present

Specifications
- Case type: Semi-rimmed, straight
- Bullet diameter: .429 in (10.9 mm)
- Neck diameter: .453 in (11.5 mm)
- Base diameter: .4706 in (11.95 mm)
- Rim diameter: .514 in (13.1 mm)
- Rim thickness: .063 in (1.6 mm)
- Case length: 2.225 in (56.5 mm)
- Overall length: 2.55 in (65 mm)
- Rifling twist: 1:38 in (microgroove) or 1:20 in (Ballard cut)
- Primer type: Large rifle
- Maximum pressure (CIP): 51,500 psi (355 MPa)
- Maximum CUP: 44,000 CUP

Ballistic performance
Bullet mass/type	Velocity	Energy
240 gr (16 g) SP	2,350 ft/s (720 m/s)	2,942 ft⋅lbf (3,989 J)
265 gr (17 g) FP	2,200 ft/s (670 m/s)	2,849 ft⋅lbf (3,863 J)
300 gr (19 g) HP	2,000 ft/s (610 m/s)	2,665 ft⋅lbf (3,613 J)
- Test barrel length: 24 in Source: Hornady / Remington

The .444 Marlin (10.9×57mmR) is a rifle cartridge designed in 1964 by Marlin Firearms and Remington Arms. It was designed to fill the gap left when the older .45-70 cartridge was not available in new lever-action rifles; at the time it was the largest lever-action cartridge available. The .444 resembles a lengthened .44 Magnum and provides a significant increase in velocity. It is usually used in the Marlin 444 lever-action rifle. Currently, Marlin, now owned by Ruger Firearms, does not offer the .444 chambering in any of their rifles. It remains to be seen if they will bring the chambering back into production. It is available in new production Rossi R95 rifles however.

== History ==
In the mid-1960s the .45-70 had all but disappeared from the American marketplace. There was no big-bore cartridge available in a lever-action rifle in current production, so Marlin decided to create a new cartridge to fill this empty niche. They created what is essentially an elongated version of the .44 Magnum by making it nearly an inch longer to give it power similar to the .45-70. The case Marlin created is very similar to a rimmed .303 British trimmed and necked-up to work with .429 bullets.

Some hunters initially claimed they had trouble because the .444 was frequently hand-loaded using existing .429 bullets that were designed for use at handgun velocities. Remington has stated in letter and email, when asked, that their 240-grain .444 bullet was not the same as a .44 Magnum handgun bullet.

Despite the litany of false rumors about the 240-grain bullets, the rifle gained additional popularity as additional bullets were designed for its higher velocity.

In 1972 Marlin re-introduced the .45-70 to their lever-action line, expanding their big-bore offerings. Sales of the .444 are now overshadowed by the .45-70 cartridge, which has enjoyed a resurgence in popularity due to interest in cowboy action shooting. This quick action and powerful stopping power has been shown to be an efficient and useful hunting rifle for experienced shooters.

== Performance ==
The .444 Marlin can push a 240-grain (16 g) bullet at velocities over 2,400 ft/s (730 m/s) generating 3,070 ft⋅lbf (4,160 J) of energy. SAAMI has rated this cartridge at 44,000 CUP. It functions efficiently when used with cast lead bullets. Hand-cast bullets allow the shooter to optimize the alloy for strength and expansion at the higher velocities generated by the Marlin over the traditional .44 caliber bullets. There are several commercial molds available for the hand-caster: the SAECO No. 433 mold, which casts a 300-grain (19 g) gas-checked bullet, and the Lyman 429640 at 280 grains (18 g) are two of the more potent bullets for this caliber. Proper cartridge length is maintained by seating the bullet to the correct depth and using a crimp die to put a firm crimp on the seated bullet to prevent slippage in the magazine tube.

The best cast bullet accuracy in the .444 Marlin is attained when utilizing bullets sized to .432 in diameter, both in the older "micro-grooved" and the newer "Ballard" style barrels. This bullet diameter is dictated more by the large diameter of chamber throats than by groove diameter of the barrel. A projectile closely fitting the throat dimensions greatly enhances the cast bullet performance of this cartridge. Those writers and publications citing the inability of the .444 Marlin's micro-groove barrel to accurately shoot cast bullets driven over 1,600 ft/s (490 m/s) are simply in error, in that those results were largely obtained using .429 and .430 in diameter cast bullets. Full factory velocity handloads when assembled using hard-cast, gas-checked bullets of .432 in diameter rival accuracy of any jacketed ammunition for this cartridge.

Three years after the introduction of the .444 Marlin, Hornady introduced a new, heavier, 265-grain (17.2 g) .430 inches (10.9 mm) bullet created specifically for use in this new .44 caliber cartridge. Since then Hornady has also made a 265 grain (17.2 g) interlock "light magnum" that boosts velocity to nearly 2,350 ft/s (720 m/s) and 3,140 ft⋅lbf (4,260 J) of energy at the muzzle. Hornady's latest offering for this caliber is its new Leverevolution ammunition that has a soft polymer spire point that can be safely loaded in tubular magazines. Because of an increased ballistic coefficient, Hornady claims increased velocity at distances over 200 yards (180 m), and velocity and energy at the muzzle of 1,971 ft/s (601 m/s), 2,285 ft⋅lbf (3,098 J) and at 200 yards (180 m), 1,652 ft/s (504 m/s) and 1,606 ft⋅lbf (2,177 J) versus 1,542 ft/s (470 m/s) and 1,400 ft⋅lbf (1,900 J) for its interlock ammo.

Other specialized companies such as Buffalo Bore, Cor-Bon, Underwood Ammo, and Grizzly Cartridge offer loadings for the .444 Marlin in bullet weights up to 335 grains (21.7 g).

== Comparisons ==
The .444 Marlin is often compared to the newer .450 Marlin which has greater energy. However, the .444 Marlin is very similar ballistically to the .45-70, the almost extinct .348 Winchester, and is virtually identical to the .405 Winchester in its 300-grain (19 g) loading. A 265-grain (17.2 g) bullet in .429 in (10.9 mm) has the same sectional density as a 300-grain (19 g) bullet in .458 in (11.6 mm) and can provide good penetration on large game. According to M. L. McPherson (editor, Cartridges of the World), "the 444 is fully capable against any species in North America" and describes its useful range as being out to about 200 yards (180 m). The typical .444 Marlin fired from a rifle has more impact energy at 200 yards (180 m) than a .44 Magnum has at the muzzle when fired from a 4-inch (100 mm) barrel.

== See also ==
- 10 mm caliber
- List of rifle cartridges
- Table of handgun and rifle cartridges
