= .308 Winchester =

Rimless, centerfire, bottlenecked rifle cartridge

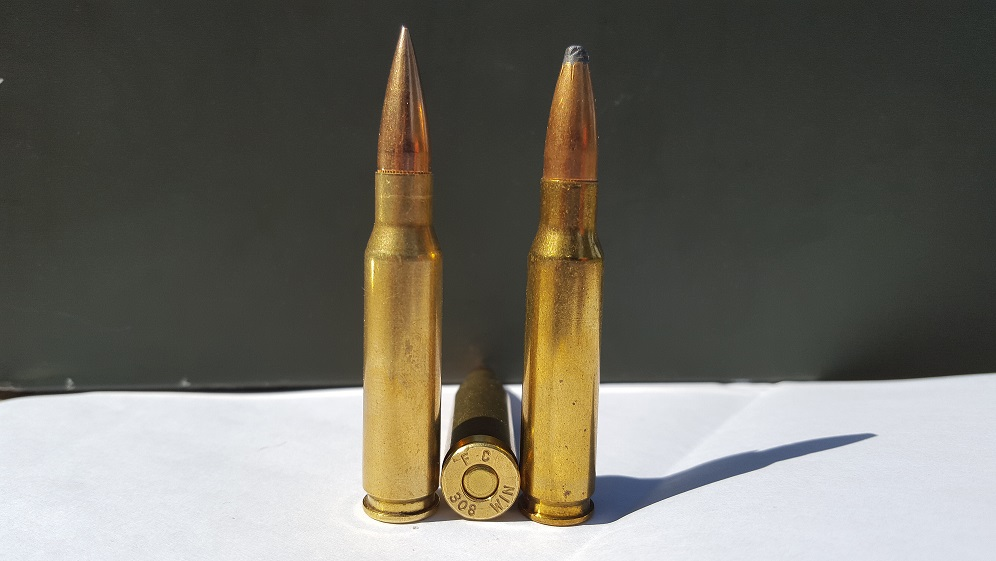
- .308 Winchester
- Type: Rifle
- Place of origin: United States

Production history
- Designed: 1952
- Produced: 1952–present

Specifications
- Case type: Rimless, bottleneck
- Bullet diameter: 0.308 in (7.82 mm)
- Land diameter: 0.300 in (7.62 mm)
- Neck diameter: 0.3433 in (8.72 mm)
- Shoulder diameter: 0.4539 in (11.53 mm)
- Base diameter: 0.4709 in (11.96 mm)
- Rim diameter: 0.4728 in (12.01 mm)
- Rim thickness: 0.0539 in (1.37 mm)
- Case length: 2.015 in (51.2 mm)
- Overall length: 2.800 in (71.1 mm)
- Case capacity: 56 gr H_{2}O (3.6 cm^{3})
- Primer type: Large rifle
- Maximum pressure (C.I.P.): 60,191 psi (415.00 MPa)
- Maximum pressure (SAAMI): 62,000 psi (430 MPa)

Ballistic performance
Bullet mass/type	Velocity	Energy
125 gr (8 g) Spitzer	3,100 ft/s (940 m/s)	2,668 ft⋅lbf (3,617 J)
150 gr (10 g) Nosler tip	2,820 ft/s (860 m/s)	2,648 ft⋅lbf (3,590 J)
168 gr (11 g) BTHP	2,650 ft/s (810 m/s)	2,619 ft⋅lbf (3,551 J)
175 gr (11 g) BTHP	2,645 ft/s (806 m/s)	2,718 ft⋅lbf (3,685 J)
185 gr (12 g) Lapua Mega JSP	2,510 ft/s (770 m/s)	2,588 ft⋅lbf (3,509 J)
- Test barrel length: 24 in (26 in for Lapua)

The .308 Winchester is a smokeless powder rimless bottlenecked rifle cartridge widely used for hunting, target shooting, police, military, and personal protection applications globally. It is similar, but not identical, to the 7.62×51mm NATO cartridge.

== History ==
During the 1940s, the .300 Savage became the basis for experiments on behalf of the U.S. military that resulted in the development of the T65 series of experimental cartridges. The original experimental case design by the Frankford Arsenal was designated "T65" and was similar to the .300 Savage case, but with less taper. The experimental cases were made from standard .30-06 Springfield cases which gave a little less capacity than standard .300 Savage cases because the Frankford Arsenal cases had slightly thicker walls. The later T65 iterations were lengthened compared to the original T65 case and provided a ballistic performance roughly equal to the U.S. military .30-06 Springfield service cartridge. Over forty years of technical progress in the field of propellants allowed for similar service cartridge performance from a significantly shorter, smaller case with less case capacity.

Winchester saw a market for a civilian model of the late T65 series designs and introduced it in 1952, two years prior to the NATO adoption of the T65E5 experimental cartridge iteration under the "7.62×51mm NATO" designation, in 1954. Winchester branded the cartridge and introduced it to the commercial hunting market as the ".308 Winchester". Winchester's Model 70, Model 88 and Model 100 rifles were subsequently chambered for the new cartridge. Since then, the .308 Winchester has become the most popular short-action, big-game hunting cartridge worldwide. It is also commonly used for hunting, target shooting, metallic silhouette, bench rest target shooting, Palma shooting, metal matches, military sniping, and police sharpshooting. The relatively short case makes the .308 Winchester especially well-adapted for short-action rifles. When loaded with a bullet that expands, tumbles, or fragments in tissue, this cartridge is capable of high terminal performance.

== Cartridge dimensions ==
The .308 Winchester has a 3.64 mL (56 gr H_{2}O) cartridge case capacity. The exterior shape of the case was designed to promote reliable case feeding and extraction in bolt-action rifles and machine guns alike, under extreme conditions.

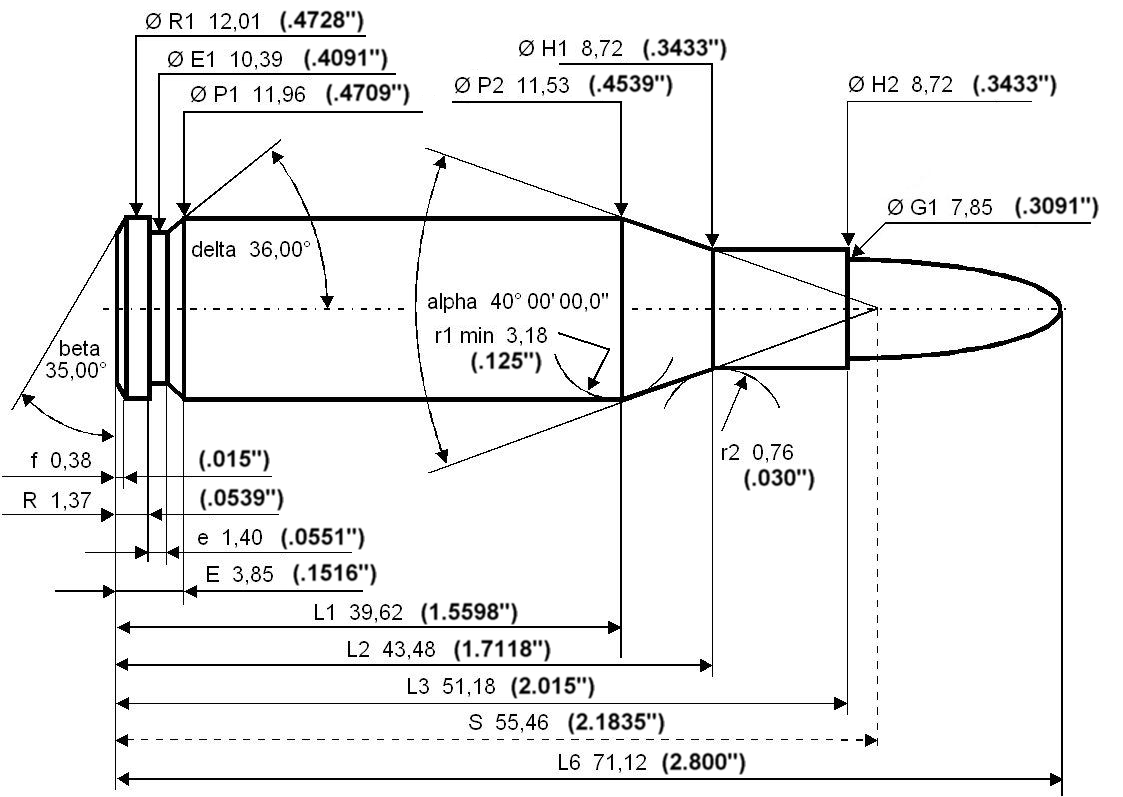

.308 Winchester maximum C.I.P. cartridge dimensions. All dimensions in millimeters (mm) and inches.

Americans define the shoulder angle at alpha/2 = 20 degrees. The common rifling twist rate for this cartridge is 305 mm (1 in 12 in), 4 grooves, Ø lands = 7.62 mm, Ø grooves = 7.82 mm, land width = 4.47 mm and the primer type is large rifle. A 254 mm (1 in 10 in) twist rate is also commonly applied.

According to the official C.I.P. (Commission internationale permanente pour l'épreuve des armes à feu portatives) rulings, the .308 Winchester can handle up to 415.00 MPa (60,191 psi) P_{max} piezo pressure. In C.I.P.-regulated countries, every rifle cartridge combo has to be proofed at 125% of this maximum C.I.P. pressure to certify for sale to consumers. This means that .308 Winchester chambered arms in C.I.P.-regulated countries are currently (2008) proof tested at 519.00 MPa (75,275 psi) PE piezo pressure.

North American SAAMI maximum pressure for the .308 Winchester is 427.47 MPa (62,000 psi).

== .308 Winchester vs. 7.62×51mm NATO ==
Although originating from an identical preceding series of experimental cartridges, the commercial 1952 .308 Winchester and the military 1954 7.62×51mm NATO chamberings have evolved separately and are not identical. The .308 Winchester and military 7.62×51mm NATO cartridges are similar enough that they can be loaded into rifles chambered for the other round, but the .308 Winchester cartridges are typically loaded to higher pressures than 7.62×51mm NATO service cartridges. Even though the Sporting Arms and Ammunition Manufacturers' Institute (SAAMI) does not consider it unsafe to fire the commercial .308 Winchester rounds in weapons chambered for the military 7.62×51mm NATO round, there is significant discussion about compatible chambers and pressures between the two cartridges based on powder loads, chamber dimensions and wall thicknesses in the web area of the military compared to commercial cartridge cases. As the chambers differ, accordingly the head space gauges used for the two chamberings differ.

== Usage and performance ==
The .308 Winchester is considered a standard hunting cartridge in the United States. It has gained popularity in many countries as an exceptional cartridge for game in the medium- to large-sized class. Although in North America it is commonly thought that it is only recommended for whitetail deer, pronghorn and the occasional caribou or black bear, the .308 Winchester is among the calibers recommended for hunting brown and grizzly bears by the Alaska Department of Game and Fish. Moreover, the Canadian Arctic Rangers chose the Colt Canada C19 in .308 Winchester/7.62×51mm NATO for "polar bear defense" in 2014; demonstrating that the .308 Winchester is suitable and even preferred for taking any medium, large or dangerous game located in the Americas.

Clay Harvey, an American gun writer, said the .308 Winchester is usable on moose and elk. Layne Simpson, an American who has hunted in Sweden, said he is surprised at how many hunters there used the cartridge. Craig Boddington was told by a Norma Precision executive that the .308 Winchester was one of Norma's best-selling calibers.

In Africa, the .308 Winchester is one of the most popular calibers among Bushveld hunters and is used on anything from duiker right up to the massive eland (a small and large African antelope respectively). Proponents of the hydrostatic shock theory contend that the .308 Winchester has sufficient energy to impart hydrostatic shock to living targets when rapidly expanding bullets deliver a high rate of energy transfer.

While .308 Winchester has traditionally been the most popular cartridge in the past, the development of lighter recoil chamberings with sufficient downrange energy, like the 7mm-08 Remington, .260 Remington, and .243 Winchester, is becoming more common for metallic silhouette shooting.

Palma shooting is a variant of full-bore target shooting done with a bolt-action rifle chambered in 7.62×51mm NATO/.308 Winchester firing match grade 155-grain bullets and using micrometer aperture iron sights out to 1,000 yards.

F-class is a variant of full-bore target rifle which permits optical telescopic sights and shooting rests at the front and rear, such as a bipod or bags. Competitions are fired at distances between 300 and 1,200 meters (or yards), and the targets are half the size of those used in traditional Palma shooting. Based on equipment, competitors can choose to compete in one of the two classes, open and standard: F-TR ("target", standard class): A restricted class which permits a scope, bipod, backpack and rear bag (no front rest), the caliber has to be either .223 Remington or .308 Winchester. In addition, the weight limit including optics is 8.25 kg (18.15 lbs.).

The .308 Winchester has slightly more drop at long range than the .30-06 Springfield, owing to its slightly lower (around 30 metres per second (100 ft/s)) muzzle velocity with most bullet weights. Cartridges with significantly higher muzzle velocities, such as the .300 Winchester Magnum can have significantly less drop at long range, but much higher recoil.

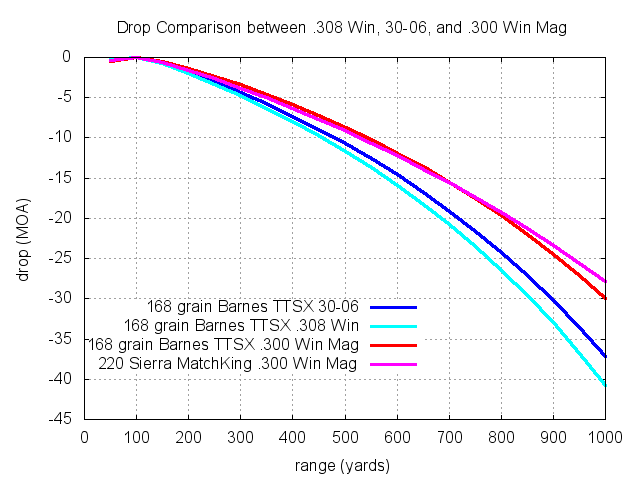
Trajectory comparisons between .308 Winchester, .30-06 Springfield, and .300 Winchester Magnum

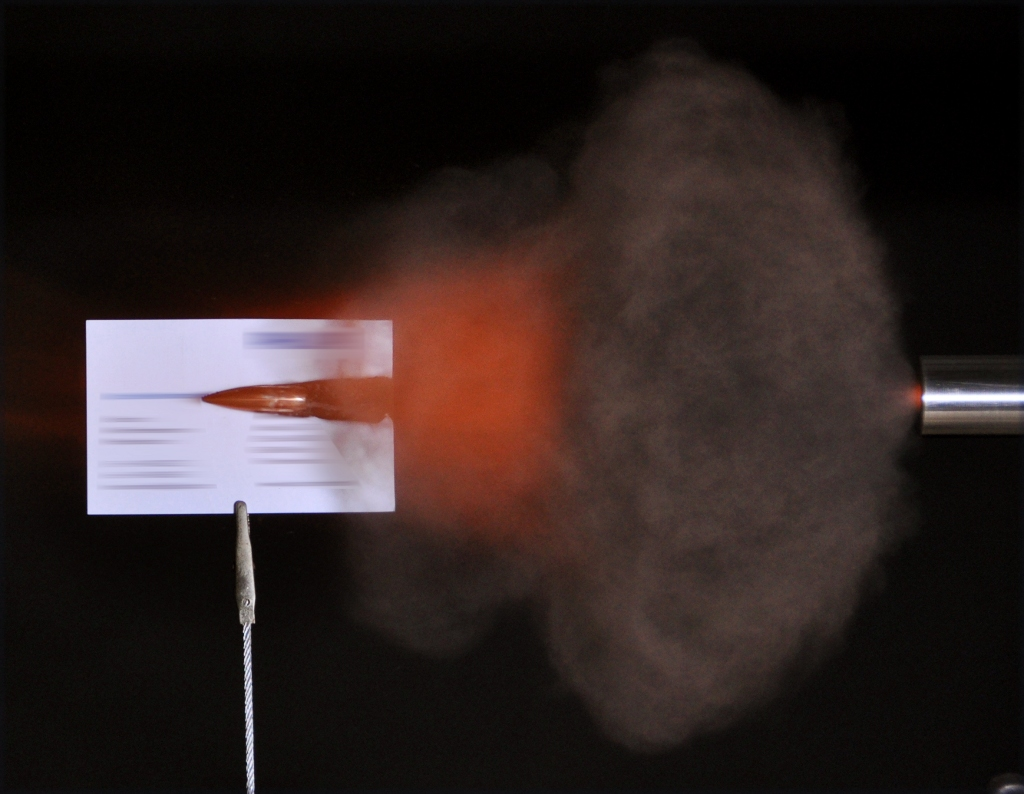
Ultra-high speed photo of a 150 grain FMJ .308 Winchester bullet photographed with an air-gap flash

== As a parent case ==
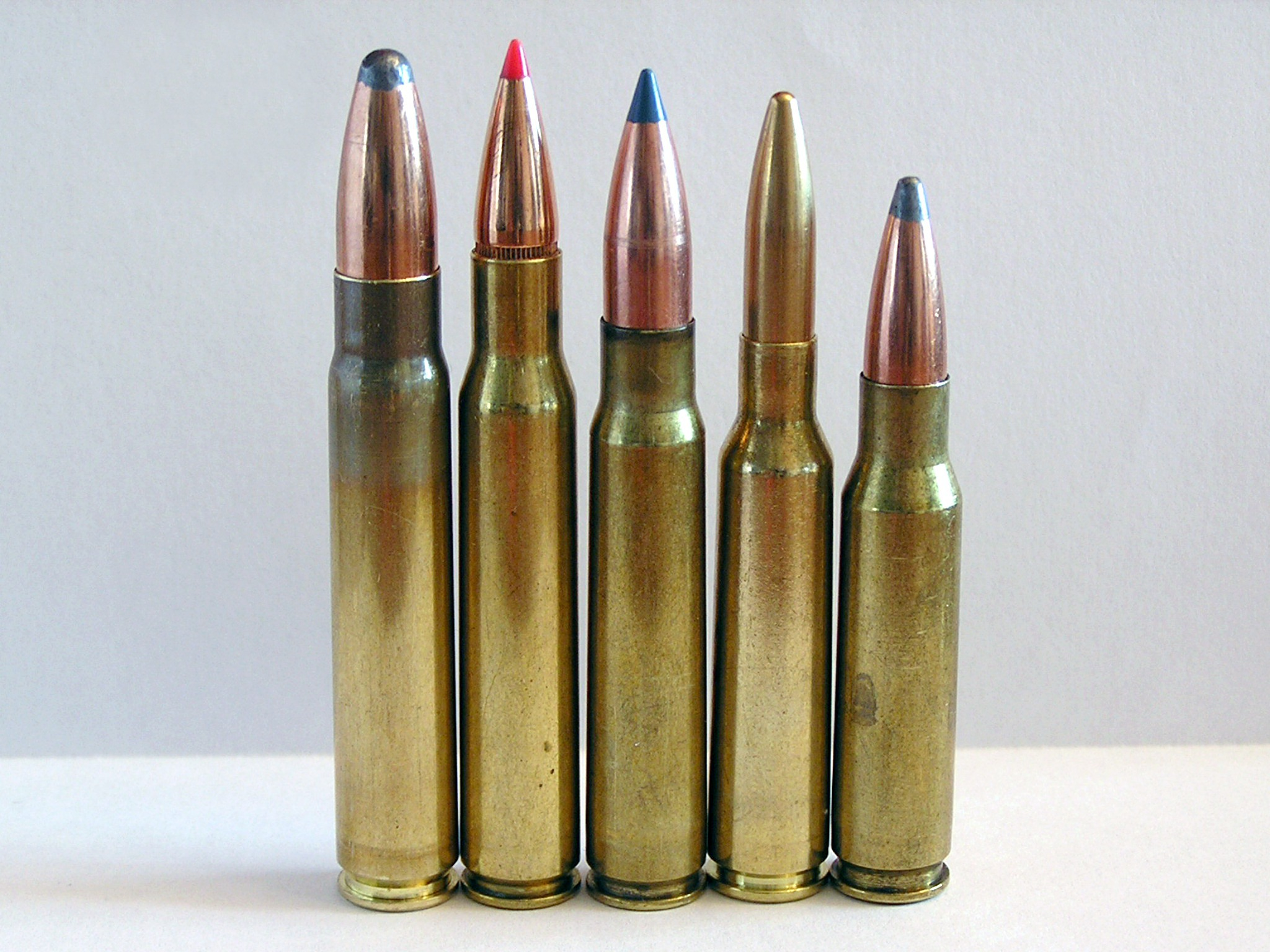
From left to right 9.3×62mm, .30-06 Springfield, 7.92×57mm Mauser, 6.5×55mm and .308 Winchester cartridges. The 7.62×51mm NATO (not pictured) is similar in appearance to the .308 Winchester.

Several cartridges have been developed using the .308 Winchester as a parent case, some becoming very popular for hunting, particularly in North America. These are the .243 Winchester, the .260 Remington (6.5-08 A-Square), the 7 mm-08 Remington, the .338 Federal, and the .358 Winchester (8.8×51mm). In 1980, two rimmed cartridges based on the .308 Winchester were introduced for use in the Winchester Model 94 XTR angle eject rifle: the .307 Winchester and the .356 Winchester. In 2014, the rimless 45 Raptor was introduced to provide a big bore cartridge for the AR-10 by combining the .308 Winchester with the .460 S&W Magnum.

The .308 Winchester family (circle size proportional to recoil)
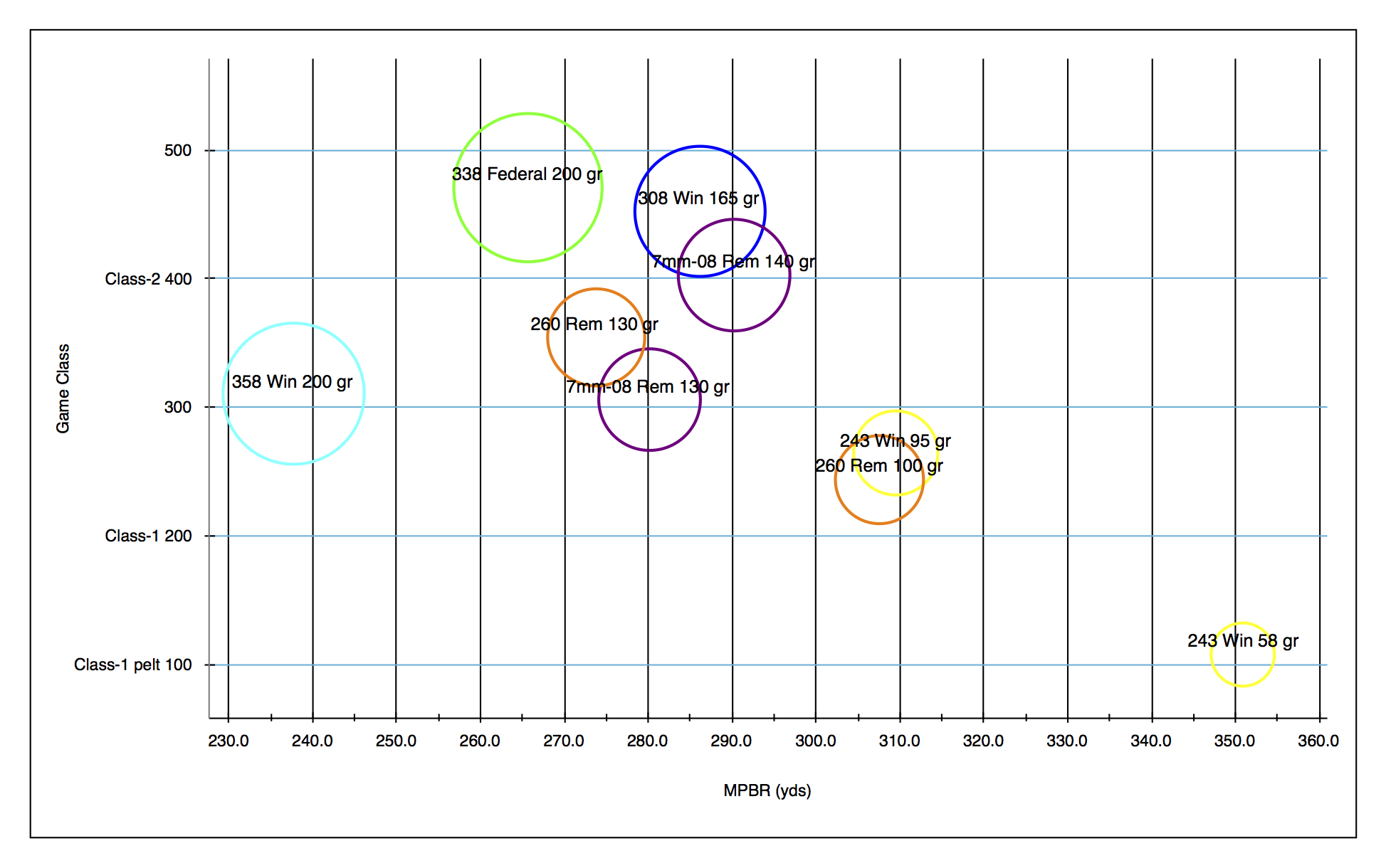
Game class vs. 6-inch maximum point blank range

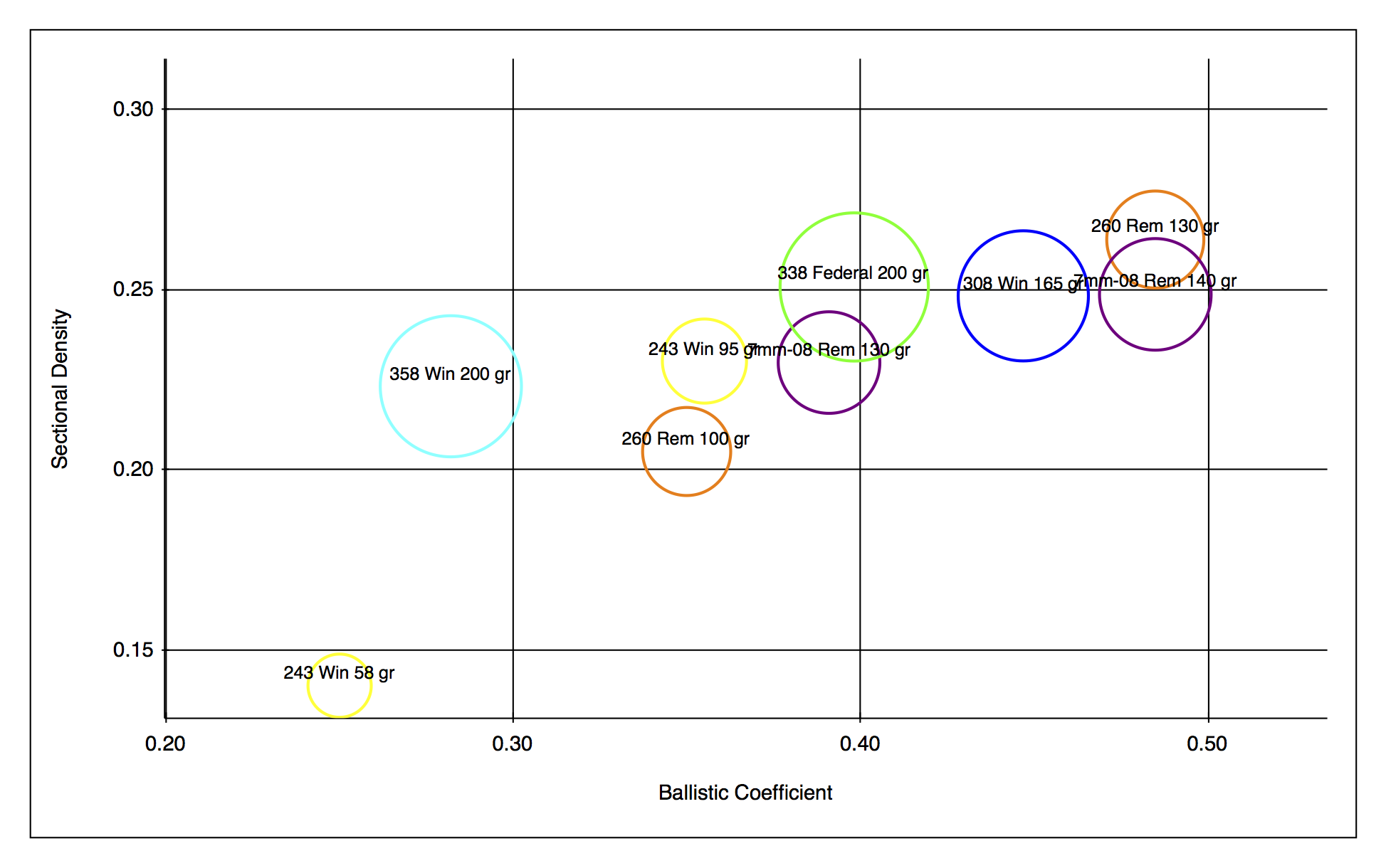
Sectional density vs. ballistic coefficient
- .243 Winchester
- .260 Remington
- 7mm-08 Remington
- 7.62×51mm NATO
- .307 Winchester
- .338 Federal
- .358 Winchester

== See also ==
- .30 Remington AR
- 7mm caliber
- Delta L problem
- List of firearms
- List of rifle cartridges
- Sectional density
- Table of handgun and rifle cartridges
