= Rim (firearms) =

Part of a firearm cartridge

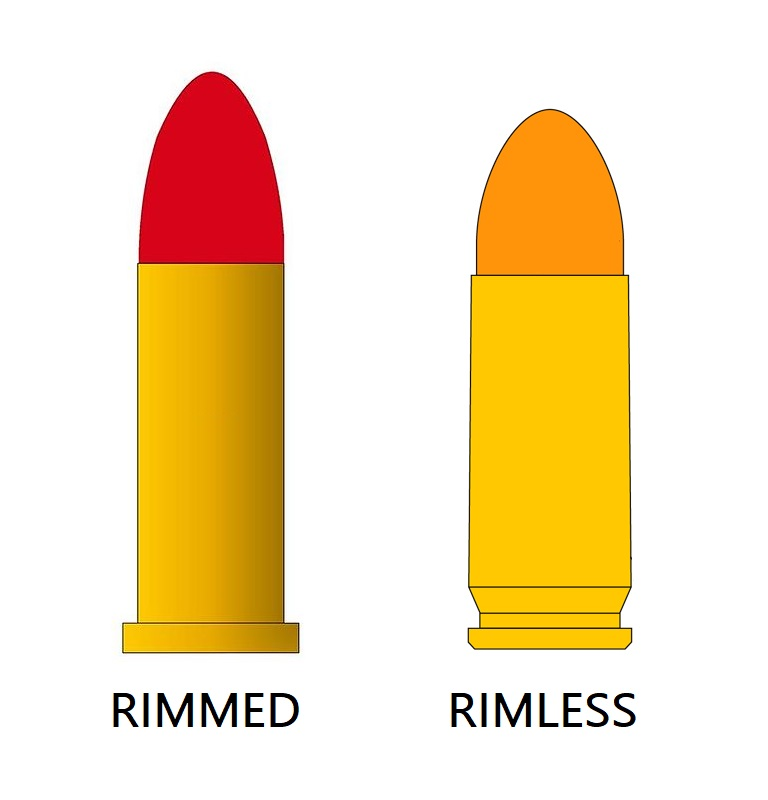
Rimmed vs rimless cartridges

A rim is an external flange that is machined, cast, molded, stamped, or pressed around the bottom of a firearms cartridge. Thus, rimmed cartridges are sometimes called "flanged" cartridges. Almost all cartridges feature an extractor or headspacing rim, in spite of the fact that some cartridges are known as "rimless cartridges". The rim may serve a number of purposes, including providing a lip for the extractor to engage, and sometimes serving to headspace the cartridge.

== Types ==
There are various types of firearms rims in use in modern ammunition. The main types are categorized as rimmed, rimless, semi-rimmed, rebated, and belted. These describe the size of the rim in relation to the base of the case.

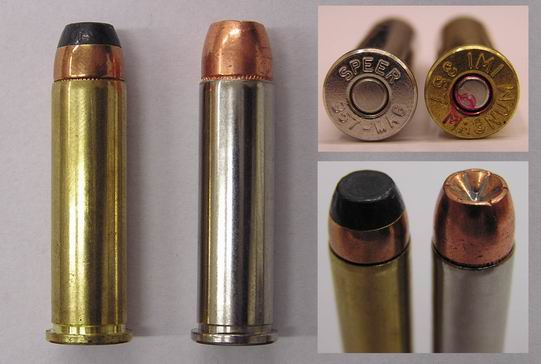
Rimmed .357 Magnum revolver ammunition

=== Rimmed ===
The rimmed cartridge, sometimes called flanged cartridge, is the oldest of the types and has a rim that is significantly larger in diameter than the base of the cartridge. Rimmed cartridges use the rim to hold the (usually straight sided) cartridge in the chamber of the firearm, with the rim serving to hold the cartridge at the proper depth in the chamber—this function is called "headspacing". Because the rimmed cartridge headspaces on the rim, the case length is of less importance than with rimless cartridges. Rimmed cartridges with straight walls, such as shotgun shells, allow various lengths of the same cartridge to be chambered in the firearm; if the round protrudes into the rifling of the barrel past the length of the chamber, the rifling can act as a fluted chamber to ease extraction.

This allows some firearms chambered for similar rimmed cartridges to safely chamber and fire shorter cartridges, such as using .38 Special cartridges in a .357 Magnum revolver, as these are the same diameter despite the nomenclature. Rimmed cartridges are well suited for certain types of actions, such as revolvers and break-action firearms, where the rim helps hold the cartridge in position.

Rimmed cartridges generally do not work quite as well in firearms that feed from a box magazine, since the magazine must be carefully loaded so that the rim from each successive case is loaded ahead of the round beneath it, so the round will not snag on the rim of the cartridge below it as the bolt strips it out of the magazine. However, box magazine firearms firing rimmed cases have seen extensive use; the famous Lee–Enfield rifle used by the UK, and the Russian Mosin-Nagant rifle which uses an interrupter to help prevent the snags, were both used from before World War I until after World War II. Semi-automatic handguns have been chambered in rimmed cartridges as well, for example a LAR Grizzly or Desert Eagle in .357 Magnum or .44 Magnum. The .22 Long Rifle is extremely popular in semi-automatics.

Rimmed cartridges work with belt-fed machine guns that use a two stage pull out – push through feeding operation, notably the Maxim gun, Vickers, M1919 Browning and M2HB. Push through links are possible with rimmed cartridges using specially designed belt links, but not as reliable as using push through links with rimless ammunition.

Rimfire cartridges also use the rim to contain the priming compound to ignite the cartridge instead of a centrally mounted primer, as is commonly used in centerfire cartridges.

Under the metric cartridge designation system, a capitalized "R" added at the end of the designation denotes a rimmed cartridge. For example, "7.62×54mmR" is a rimmed cartridge, while "7.62×51mm" is a rimless cartridge. Under imperial or US customary designations, there is typically no distinction between rimmed and unrimmed cartridges, unless one is referring to a rimmed version of a cartridge which is typically rimless, such as the .45 Auto Rim, a special rimmed version of the .45 ACP ("Automatic Colt Pistol" aka ".45 Auto"), intended for use in M1917 service revolvers.

Examples of rimmed handgun cartridges include the .38 Special, .357 Magnum, .44 Special, .44 Magnum, .45 Schofield, and .45 Colt. Rimmed rifle cartridge examples include the .22 Hornet, .30-30 Winchester, 7.62×54mmR, .303 British, 8×50mmR Lebel, and .45-70 Government.

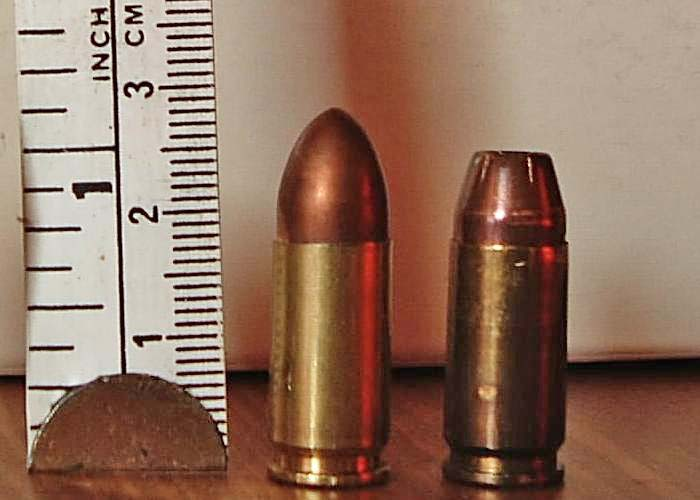
Rimless 9mm Parabellum pistol cartridges

=== Rimless ===
As early as 1867 Joseph Whitworth patented a round which "has a solid metal back without any projecting flange, as heretofore, the ring groove already mentioned being a substitute for it". Even though some rifles were designed for rimless cartridges by Bethel Burton, Eduard Rubin and others, the first adoption did not come until 1888 with the German Patrone 88.

The rim on a "rimless" case is almost or exactly the same diameter as the base of the case. A recess formed between the rim and the body of the cartridge is known as an extractor groove, allowing the case to be grasped by an extractor after being fired. Since there is no rim projecting past the edge of the case, the cartridge must headspace on the case mouth, for a straight walled case, or on the case's shoulder for a bottlenecked case (although a bottlenecked case can headspace on the case mouth, depending on the cartridge); the extractor groove serves only for extraction. The lack of a projecting rim makes rimless cases feed very smoothly from box magazines, drum magazines, and belts. Rimless cases are not well suited to break-open and revolver actions, though in break-action firearms they can be used with appropriate modifications, such as a spring-loaded extractor/ejector or, in a revolver, a half or full moon clip (for example, the Colt or Smith & Wesson M1917 revolvers in .45 ACP).

Since a straight-walled rimless cartridge is designed to headspace off of the case mouth, this prevents the ammunition loader or manufacturer from using a heavy crimp, which is a ring pinched or "crimped" into the cartridge case, designed to lock the bullet securely in place until fired. Crimping affects the overall length of the cartridge, and thus cannot be used on cartridges which headspace on the case mouth. This can be a problem for magnum revolvers or rifles which simultaneously chamber more than one round of ammunition, as the recoil from the firing successive rounds can loosen the bullets in the remaining cartridges, and cause their bullet seating depth to change, which can have a serious effect on accuracy, or could, in the case of a revolver, cause a bullet to protrude sufficiently from the front of the cylinder to obstruct the revolving of the cylinder thus jamming the gun from firing additional rounds. This is not an issue for break-action single shot firearms, since there is no cycling action to jam, although it could potentially cause accuracy (but not jamming) problems in double barreled rifles, double barreled shotguns, or combination guns, provided they have more than one rifle barrel. Some combination guns, such as "drillings" or "vierlings" are made with three or four rifle barrels, without any shotgun barrels.

Examples of rimless handgun cartridges include the .380 ACP, 9mm Parabellum, .357 SIG, .38 Super, .40 S&W, 10mm Auto, .45 GAP, .45 ACP, .50 AE and .50 GI. Rimless rifle examples include the .223 Remington, 6.5×52mm Carcano, 6.5×54mm Mannlicher–Schönauer, 6.5×55mm Swedish, .308 Winchester, .30-06 Springfield, 7.65×53mm and 7.92×57mm Mauser.

=== Semi-rimmed ===
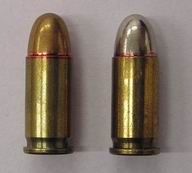
Semi-rimmed .32 ACP pistol cartridges

On a semi-rimmed case the rim projects slightly beyond the base of the case, though not as much as a rimmed cartridge. The tiny rim provides minimal interference feeding from a box magazine, while still providing enough surface to headspace on. Semi-rimmed cases are less common than the other types.

The .38 Super, a higher pressure loading of the old .38 ACP case, is notorious for being less accurate than rimless cases, and so most modern .38 Super handguns are chambered so that the cartridge headspaces off the case mouth, like a rimless case. If the chamber is cut shallow, so the case headspaces off the mouth, the rim is used for extraction only; a standard chamber will use the rim for both headspacing and extraction.

Examples of semi-rimmed handgun cartridges are .25 ACP, .32 ACP, 8×22mm Nambu, .38 ACP, .38 Super, and 9mm Browning Long. Semi-rimmed rifle examples include the .220 Swift, .280 Ross, 6.5×50mm Arisaka, .308 Marlin Express, .338 Marlin Express, and .444 Marlin.

=== Rebated ===
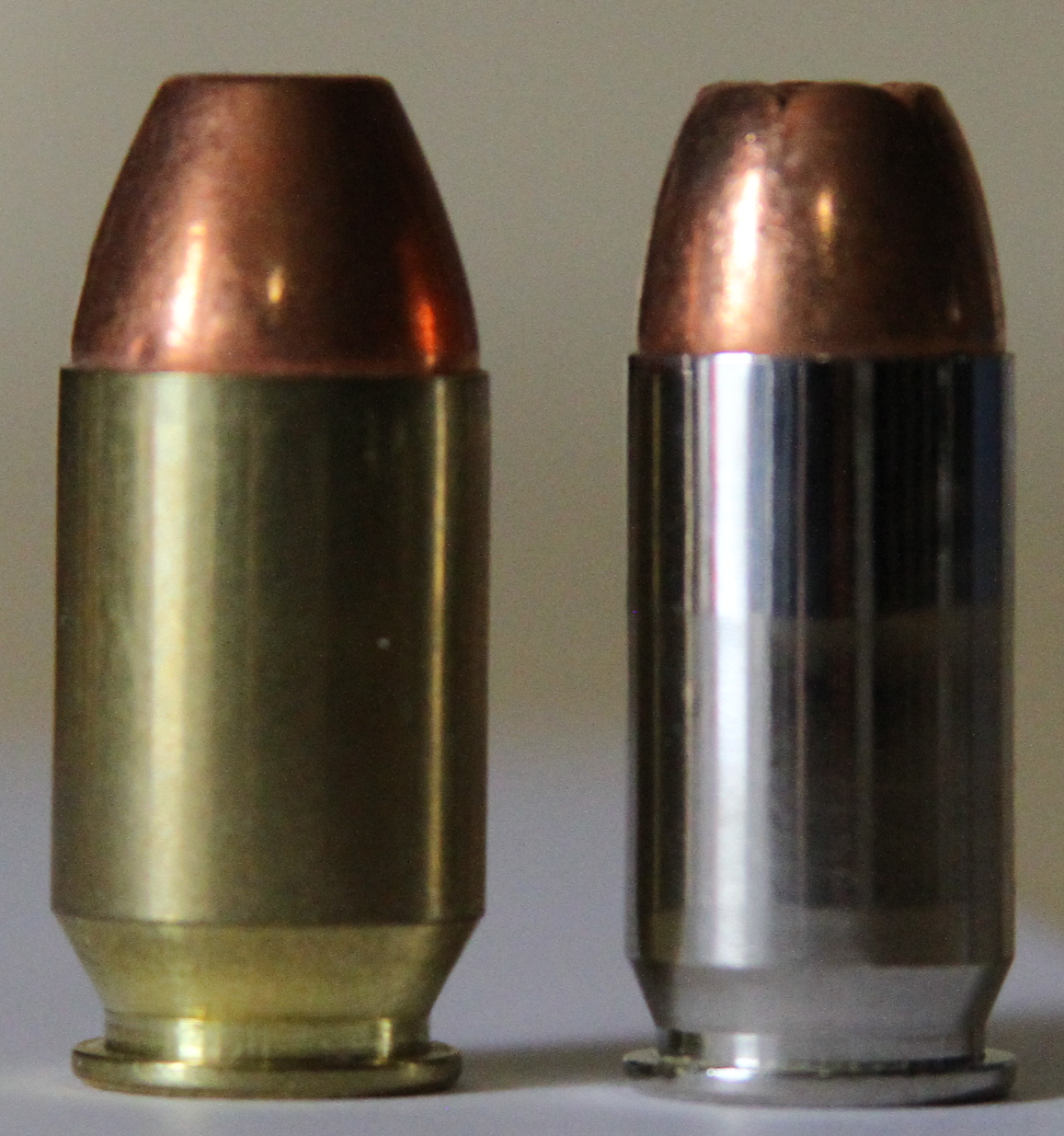
The .50 GI (left) has a rebated rim the same size as the rimless .45 ACP (right)

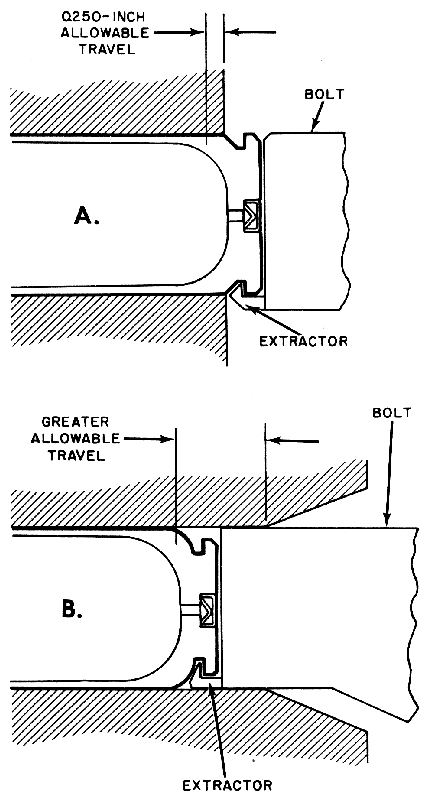
- A: Normal rim
- B: Rebated rim

Rebated cartridges have a rim that is significantly smaller in diameter than the base of the cartridge case, serving only for extraction. Functionally the same as a rimless case, the rebated rim allows a gun to be easily converted to fire a larger-than-normal cartridge, as most of a firearm's loading and extraction mechanism does not need to be altered as long as the rim size is preserved. Another advantage of rebated-rim cartridges, mostly with straight-walled examples, is the usage of virtually any length of cartridge of the same caliber.

An example of a rebated-rim cartridge is the .50 Action Express, commonly chambered in the Desert Eagle pistol. In order to simplify production, and to decrease the cost of ownership, the .50 AE was designed with a rebated rim which matched the diameter of the rim of the .44 Magnum, the most common caliber used in the Desert Eagle pistol. By using the same rim dimensions, a Desert Eagle could be converted from the .44 Magnum to the .50 Action Express by merely changing the barrel and magazine. Other convertible cartridges, such as the short-lived .41 Action Express (with the same rim diameter as 9×19mm Parabellum) used in the Jericho 941 convertible pistol and Uzi submachine gun and carbine, would function in the same magazine, and thus required only a barrel change for a different caliber.

The .440 Cor-Bon is another cartridge with a rebated rim the same diameter as the .44 Magnum. The FN 5.7×28mm (used in the FN Five-seveN semi-automatic handgun and FN P90 personal defense weapon) is a well-known cartridge with a slightly rebated rim, but the reason for the choice is not clear, as there is no other cartridge it is known to be compatible with.

The recent (early 2000s) Winchester Short Magnum, Winchester Super Short Magnum, Remington Ultra Magnum and Remington Short Action Ultra Magnum families of rifle cartridges also featured rims that are rebated. All of these cases were based on the .404 Jeffery with the rim reduced from .543 inches to fit the .532 inch bolt face for existing magnum rifles.

The only known shotgun shells using rebated rims is the Roper repeating shotgun and the 12 Gauge RAS12, specially made for the RAS-12 semi-automatic shotgun.

The .50 Beowulf rifle cartridge uses a rebated-rim design. This round is used in specialized AR-15 upper receivers, and the rim matches the size of the rim of the 7.62×39mm, allowing those parts to be used in the custom-built upper receivers.

Other rebated rifle cartridges include the .350 Legend, .400 Legend, .450 Bushmaster, .458 SOCOM, .500 Jeffery, and .375 SWISS P.

Rebated cartridges are used for a different reason on automatic cannons derived from the 20-mm Becker, of which the best known belong to the Oerlikon family. These "advanced primer ignition" (API) blowback weapons feature straight-sided chambers which are longer than necessary to contain the case. The face of the bolt has the same diameter as the case and follows it into the chamber. This means that the extraction claw also has to fit within the chamber, and therefore the case's rim has been rebated.

An unusual example of rebated-rim autocannon rounds has been used in the T168 autocannon prototype, the 3%1×120mmRB T268 which was designed for reverse loading of the rounds into the chamber. A telescopic example existed, the 23×260mm round used in the Rikhter R-23 autocannon that operated in a similar way.

=== Belted ===
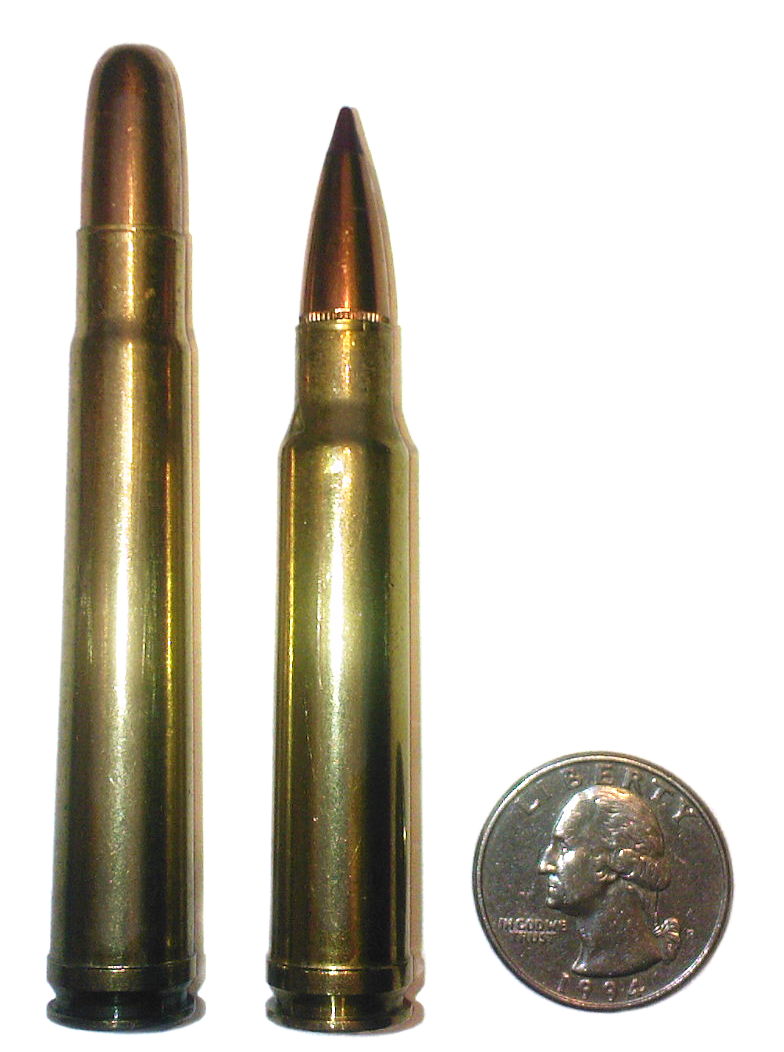
Belted .375 H&H Magnum (left), .338 Winchester Magnum (right), US quarter (24 mm) for scale

The original purpose of the "belt" on belted cases (often referred to as belted magnums) was to provide headspacing; the extractor groove is cut into the belt just as it is cut into the case head on a rimless case. The belt acts as a rim on what is essentially a rimless case. The design originated in England around 1910 with the .400/375 Belted Nitro Express (also known as the .375/.400 Holland & Holland, and .375 Velopex). The addition of the belt allowed the cartridge to properly headspace, despite the relative lack of a definite shoulder. The reason for the lack of a definitive shoulder was that these old British cartridge cases were intended for firing cordite charges instead of modern smokeless powder. Cordite was extruded as spaghetti-like rods, so the cartridge cases had to be fairly cylindrical shaped to accommodate the cordite propellant rods. The belt was carried through on other cartridges derived from the .375 Velopex, like the belted .375 Holland & Holland Magnum of 1912, in some cases to allow the cartridge to function in bolt-action rifles (the original .375 H&H Magnum was a rimmed case for use in double-barreled rifles), or to prevent the higher-pressure magnum cartridge from accidentally being chambered in a gun with a chamber of similar size.

Examples of belted handgun cartridges include the .40 BSA Auto Pistol and .40 G&A Magnum. Belted rifle / machine gun examples include the .224 Weatherby Magnum, .300 Winchester Magnum, .375 H&H Magnum, .450 Marlin, .458 Lott, 13×64mmB and .55 Boys.

In the United States, the belt became somewhat synonymous with "magnum" during the late 20th century. More recently, new "magnum" cartridges introduced in the United States have been rimless or used rebated rims based on the .404 Jeffery that fit the same .512" bolt face used for the belted cases.

== See also ==
- List of handgun cartridges
- List of rifle cartridges
- Table of handgun and rifle cartridges
