= Rifle cartridge =

Firearm ammunition type

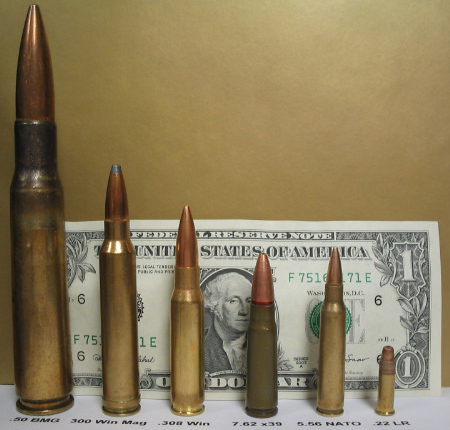
Heavy machine-gun cartridge: 12.7×99mm NATO, Full-power rifle cartridges: 300 Win Mag, 7.62×51mm NATO (.308 Winchester), Intermediate rifle cartridges: 7.62×39mm, 5.56×45mm NATO, Rimfire cartridge: .22 Long Rifle

A rifle cartridge is a firearm cartridge primarily designed and intended for use in a rifle/carbine, or machine gun.

== Types ==
=== Full-powered ===
A full-powered cartridge is a rifle cartridge used interchangeably between service rifles, sniper rifles, and general purpose machine guns. It is a retronym for rifle cartridges used prior to and during World War II. They are primarily used today in general purpose machine guns, designated marksman rifles, and sniper rifles.

=== Magnum ===
A magnum cartridge is a cartridge with a larger case size than, or derived from, a similar cartridge of the same bullet caliber and case shoulder shape. Magnum cartridges allow for more propellant to be loaded within the casing, and thus have a higher muzzle energy. Modern magnum rifle cartridges include .300 RUM, 7mm Remington Magnum, .300 Weatherby Magnum, .460 Weatherby Magnum, .300 Winchester Magnum, .338 Lapua Magnum or .338 Norma Magnum. Today they are primarily used in civilian market for big-game hunting, or as a military ammunition for some long-range sniper rifles.

=== Intermediate ===
An intermediate cartridge is a military cartridge that is less powerful than typical full-power cartridges such as the 7.92mm Mauser, .30-06 Springfield, or 7.62×51mm NATO, but still significantly more powerful than handgun cartridges used in service pistols and submachine guns. As their recoil is significantly reduced compared to full-powered cartridges, fully automatic rifles firing intermediate cartridges are relatively easy to control. This reduced recoil impulse also allows for rapid, accurate follow-up shots with semi-automatic rifles or rifles with a semi-automatic fire mode. However, even though less powerful than traditional full-power cartridges, the external and terminal ballistics of an intermediate cartridge are still sufficient for an effective range of 300–600 m (330–660 yd), which are the typical maximum engagement ranges for ordinary infantrymen in modern combat conditions.

The introduction of intermediate cartridges allowed for the development of the assault rifle concept, which is a magazine-fed selective fire rifle lighter and more compact than the conventional battle rifles firing full-powered cartridges. The first intermediate cartridge was the German 7.92×33mm Kurz for the StG 44, the world's first assault rifle. Other examples include the Soviet 7.62×39mm used in the AK-47 and AKM series, the .280 British round developed for the EM-2, and the 5.56×45mm NATO for the AR-15/M16/M4 series rifles.

== See also ==
- List of rifle cartridges
- Fully powered cartridge
- Ammunition
- Wildcat cartridge
- Handgun cartridge
- Shotgun shell
