= List of AR platform cartridges =

The AR platform has become widely popular for makers of hunting and sporting rifles. Although the designations "AR-10" and "AR-15" are respectively trademarks of ArmaLite and Colt, variants of both are made by many manufacturers. The AR-15 usually comes chambered for either the military cartridge 5.56×45mm or the .223 Remington, and the AR-10 often comes in .308 Winchester (7.62×51mm). Because of the pressures associated with the 5.56×45mm, it is not advisable to fire 5.56×45mm rounds in an AR-15 marked as .223 Remington (though opinions differ), since this can result in damage to the rifle or injury to the shooter. On the other hand, .308 and 7.62×51mm are considered interchangeable by SAAMI. AR-15-compatible firearms are now made by many manufacturers and in a multitude of calibers, thus the term AR-15–style rifle is used to encompass them all.

== AR-15 cartridges ==
=== Rimfire cartridges ===
- .17 Mach 2
- .17 HMR
- .17 Winchester Super Magnum
- .22 Long Rifle
- .22 Winchester Magnum Rimfire

=== Centerfire cartridges imperial measurement ===
- .17 Mach IV
- .17 Remington Fireball
- .17 Remington
- .17-223
- .20 Practical (wildcat)
- .20 GPC (wildcat)
- .22 GPC (wildcat)
- .204 Ruger
- 22 Grendel (wildcat) aka 224 Grendel
- .22 Nosler
- .22 PPC
- .22 ARC
- .222 Remington (sometimes chambered in countries where civilian ownership of military cartridges is illegal)
- .223 Remington – Original AR-15 cartridge: .223 cartridges may function in a 5.56×45mm rifle, however 5.56×45mm cartridges may produce excessive pressure in a .223 Rem rifle. On the other hand, a .223 Wylde chamber is used on .223 Rem rifle barrels to allow them to safely fire either .223 Remington or 5.56×45mm NATO ammunition.
- .223 Winchester Super Short Magnum
- .224 Kritzeck (wildcat of a .223 Remington with shortened neck)
- .224 Valkyrie
- .244 Valkyrie (wildcat) Neck up Virgin .224 Valkyrie Brass shoulder blown forward to 1.24". Wild Monkey
- .24 GPC
- .245-6.8 SPC ("M-245" 6.8 Brass 1.65" length 40 degree improved.413" shoulder .235" Neck Length) Wild Monkey
- .24-6.8 SPC (1.6512" Brass length, .235" Neck length, 30 Degree shoulder) Wild Monkey
- .243 LBC
- .243 Winchester Super Short Magnum
- .25 Winchester Super Short Magnum
- .25-45 Sharps
- .25-GTX (6mm GT Brass punched to .257 Caliber & trimmed to 1.657") Wild Monkey
- .257 Ocelot (wildcat)
- .25 GPC (wildcat)
- .26 GPC (wildcat)
- .27 GPC (wildcat)
- .277 Wolverine (semi-wildcat)
- .277 MSR (wildcat)
- .28 GPC (wildcat)
- .30 American
- .30 Carbine
- .30 GPC (wildcat)
- .30 Remington AR (discontinued)
- .30 Sabertooth (wildcat)
- .30-350 Legend (wildcat) neck down to .308 Bullets, one pass. Wild Monkey
- .300 OSSM
- .300 AAC Blackout (7.62×35mm)
- .300 Whisper
- .300 HAM'R – Wilson Combat
- .338 ARC
- .338 SOCOM (wildcat)
- .338 Spectre (wildcat)
- .350 Legend
- 357 Max AR (5.56 case straight walled to .357)
- .357 Automag (wildcat)
- .358 MGP (wildcat)
- .358 SOCOM (wildcat)
- .358 Yeti (wildcat)
- .375-SPC (wildcat) Straight Wall 6.8 SPC Case. Wild Monkey
- .375 Stalker (wildcat)
- .375 SOCOM
- .40 S&W
- .400 AR (wildcat)
- .400 Legend
- .400 AR
- .41-Grendel (wildcat) Straight Wall 6.5 Grendel Case, .41 or .416 Caliber depending on bullet choice. Wild Monkey
- .41-Legend (Wildcat) 400 Legend necked up to .41 or .416 Caliber depending on bullet choice. Wild Monkey
- .44 Automag (wildcat)
- .44 Remington Magnum
- .44 SOCOM (wildcat)
- .440 Corbon Magnum (wildcat)
- .44-08 Regular (wildcat) .308 Brass cut at Shoulder. 44 Caliber bullets, .429 in (10.9 mm). Wild Monkey
- .44-LONG (wildcat) .429 Caliber .308 Straight Wall 1.928" long, Max Case Capacity in 2.23" Magazine. Wild Monkey
- .45 ACP
- .450 Bushmaster
- .458 SOCOM
- .475 SOCOM (wildcat)
- .499 LWR
- .50 Action Express
- .50 Beowulf
- .50 SOCOM (wildcat)

=== Centerfire cartridges metric measurement ===
- 4.6×30mm – PDW
- 5.45×39mm – intermediate
- 5.56×45mm NATO – Original M16A1 cartridge: Can also safely fire .223 Remington, intermediate
- FN 5.7×28mm – PDW, AR-57
- 6mm Max (wildcat)
- 6mm Mongoose (wildcat)
- 6mm Murph (wildcat) (.244-350 Legend Military Cartridge - SAW replacement) Wild Monkey
- 6mm ARC – rifle
- 6mm Dasher
- 6mm AR (wildcat)
- 6×45mm – intermediate
- 6.5mm Grendel – intermediate
- 6.5 Timberwolf (wildcat)
- 6.8×39mm (.277 Wolverine) – intermediate
- 6.8mm Remington SPC – intermediate
- 7mm Valkyrie (wildcat)
- 7.62×33mm (.30 Carbine) – carbine
- 7.62×37mm Musang (wildcat) – intermediate
- 7.62×39mm – intermediate
- 7.62×40mm Wilson Tactical – rifle
- 7.62×42mm (wildcat) "30-400 Legend" necked down to .308 Caliber. Wild Monkey
- 8x45mm (wildcat) "8mm Magie" Straight Wall 5.56 Case, Trim to 40.5mm for longer bullets in AR15. Wild Monkey

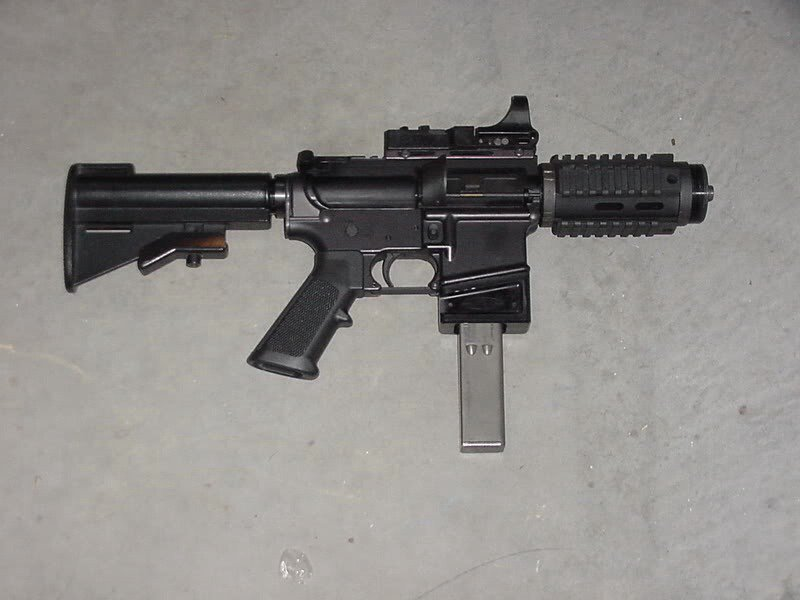
An "AR-9" 9mm AR-style rifle.

- 9×19mm Parabellum – pistol
- 9×39mm – subsonic rifle
- 10mm Auto (10×25mm) – pistol
- 10mm SOCOM (wildcat)
- 10×43mm (.400AR wildcat)

== AR-10 cartridges ==
- .220 Swift
- .22-250 Remington
- 6mm-250
- .243 Winchester
- 6mm Remington
- 6mm Creedmoor
- .257 Roberts
- 6.5×51 NATO (wildcat) 7.62×51mm NATO necked down to 6.5 mm w/ 30-degree shoulder & .287" neck length. Wild Monkey
- 6.5×47mm Lapua
- 6.5mm Creedmoor
- .260 Remington
- 6.5 WSM (wildcat)
- .270 Winchester Short Magnum
- .277 Fury
- 7mm-RPC (wildcat) 7mm SAUM neck location 30° shoulder .308 Brass, "7mm Rum Punch Colonial". Wild Monkey
- 7mm-08 Remington
- 7mm Winchester Short Magnum
- 7mm Remington Short Action Ultra Magnum
- .308 Winchester – considered interchangeable with 7.62×51mm NATO according to SAAMI.
- 7.62×51 NATO - Original cartridge
- .300 Winchester Short Magnum
- .300 Remington Short Action Ultra Magnum
- .325 Winchester Short Magnum
- .338 Federal
- .338 RCM
- .338 WSM
- 8.6 Blackout
- .358 Winchester
- .358 Winchester Short Magnum
- .375 Raptor
- .375 Winchester Short Magnum
- .416 Winchester Short Magnum
- .450 Marlin
- .45 Raptor
- .458 HAM'R
- .458 WSM
- 45-70 Auto
- .458 Winchester Short Magnum
- 475 Bishop Short Magnum
- .50 Krater
- .500 Auto Max
- .500 Phantom
- .510 Winchester Short Magnum

== Other AR pattern rifles ==
Some companies have created AR pattern rifles that depart from the standard AR-15 and AR-10 dimensions in order to accommodate other types of ammunition that would not fit into those standards.

Examples include (sorted by overall cartridge length):

Cartridge	Overall length
7.5×55mm Swiss	77.70 mm (3.059 in)
6.5×55mm	80.00 mm (3.150 in)
.25-06 Remington	82.60 mm (3.252 in)
7mm Remington Magnum	84.00 mm (3.307 in)
.270 Winchester	84.80 mm (3.339 in)
.300 Winchester Magnum	85.00 mm (3.346 in)
.30-06 Springfield	85.00 mm (3.346 in)
.26 Nosler	85.00 mm (3.346 in)
.28 Nosler	85.00 mm (3.346 in)
.30 Nosler	85.00 mm (3.346 in)
.33 Nosler	85.00 mm (3.346 in)
.338 Lapua Magnum	93.50 mm (3.681 in)

== Other AR pattern firearms ==
A variety of manufacturers have introduced semiautomatic shotguns whose overall designs are heavily influenced by the AR pattern rifle.

- 12 Gauge
- 20 Gauge
- .410 bore

== Parent cases for reloading non-standard calibers ==
Some of the calibers listed above use a proprietary case that is specific to that given cartridge. Other cartridges were derived from re-forming an existing case and possibly trimming the length in order to arrive at a case-shape that meets the standardized SAAMI-spec dimensions.

AR-15:

22 Nosler : Proprietary, uses the head and rim dimensions of the 5.56×45, and a case-body that is similar to the 6.8 SPC case. To increase powder capacity, the shoulder is located higher than the 6.8, and the case is longer. The neck is sized for .224 caliber bullets.

224 Valkyrie : Uses 6.8 SPC cases, trimmed shorter, and the shoulder re-formed at a lower location due to being designed for using relatively long "high BC" (Ballistic Coefficient) bullets. The neck is sized for .224 caliber bullets.

25-45 Sharps : Uses the standard military 5.56×45 case (also .223 cases), the neck is simply expanded to .257"

6.5mm Grendel :The Grendel uses the same head and rim from the .220 Russian and the 7.62×39 with a rim diameter of 0.441-0.449. The 6.5 Grendel bullets have a true diameter of 6.71mm / 0.264" and the 6.5 Grendel case can be formed from abundant 7.62×39 cases with a neck re-sizing die, and fire-forming a slight change to the shoulder, if the case is made from brass. Many of the popular 7.62×39 cases are made from steel, which will not work for reforming the shoulder.

277 Wolverine : Standard military 5.56×45 case (also .223), shoulder is reformed lower, length is trimmed, neck is sized to .277

6.8 SPC (.277) : Proprietary. Developed as an all new cartridge in the hopes of gaining a military contract. Rim diameter is 0.421"

300 AAC Blackout : Uses military 5.56×45 (also .223). The shoulder is reformed, length is trimmed, neck is sized to .308. This caliber is very popular, and examples are available in a wide variety of styles. Bullet weights can currently be found between 100gr to 220gr

7.62×40 Wilson Tactical (300 HAM'R) : Uses 5.56 NATO cases (also .223). Shoulder is re-formed, length is trimmed, neck is sized to .308. This cartridge is very similar to the 300 AAC Blackout, but the shoulder is slightly higher and the case is slightly taller, which allows for more gunpowder capacity when loading the lighter/shorter high-velocity bullets.

338 Spectre : Uses 10mm Magnum pistol cases with a 6.8 SPC bolt-face. A shoulder is formed, and the case is lightly trimmed to length, and the neck is sized to .338, down from 0.401". The 10mm rim is 0.424" (10.8mm) in diameter, and the SPC rim diameter is 0.422" (10.7mm). The .338 caliber bullets are available in weights between 200gr-250gr.

350 Legend : Proprietary. The head and rim dimensions exactly match the military 5.56×45 case, allowing the use of the standard bolt-face of an AR-15. However, the case has an added taper and is longer than 5.56×45 cases, so these cannot be reformed from any other existing case. The nominal bullet diameter is .357-inch, but SAAMI specs allow the bullet diameter variance to be .355-.357

357 Auto : Wildcat. Uses 10mm magnum pistol cases with a 6.8 SPC bolt-face. The existing 357-Sig pistol is a 9mm bullet shouldered into the larger 40 S&W pistol case. The 10mm cartridge and the 40 S&W are almost identical, but the 10mm case is longer and operates at a higher pressure. This means that you can use existing 357-Sig dies to re-form the straight-wall 10mm case into a shouldered .355" (9mm), and then the neck can be sized up to accept .358 rifle bullets. This is in response to the popularity of the 300 Blackout at subsonic velocities. If the bullet velocity is capped at 1,000-Feet Per Second / FPS in order to subdue the noise of firing, then the impact can be improved by increasing the weight of the bullet. The 357 Auto can be loaded with bullets in .358-caliber, while still fitting within the AR-15 COAL of 2.260". Bullet weights are currently available between 225gr-310gr

358 Yeti :Uses standard military 7.62×51 cases (also .308), length is trimmed, shoulder is reformed, neck is sized to .358". Bullet weights are currently available between 225gr-310gr

375 Stalker : Standard military 7.62×51 cases (also .308), length is trimmed, shoulder is reformed, neck is expanded to .375

375 SOCOM : Proprietary. The case head and rim dimensions exactly match the military 7.62×51 (also .308), however, the case body is slightly wider and has more taper.

400 AR : Wildcat. The parent is the 7.35×51mm Carcano rifle case. It has a rim diameter of 0.447", which allows the use of the 7.62×39mm bolt face of an AR-15. The case is necked out and trimmed off above the shoulder at a case-length of 1.700", with a COAL of 2.250", resulting in a "straight-wall" cartridge. It uses .4005" jacketed rifle bullets, and can accept bullets from .40 S&W and 10mm Auto pistols (135gr–230gr).

400 Legend : Proprietary. The rebated rim dimensions exactly match the 6.8mm Remington SPC case, allowing the use of the 6.8mm SPC bolt-face of an AR-15, but the case has a base diameter of .4400" and cannot be reformed from any other existing case. The 400 LGND uses .4005" jacketed rifle bullets.

450 Bushmaster : Uses .284 Winchester cases. Cut the length to 1.700" to form a straight-wall cartridge, from 2.170". The .284 Winchester case is very similar to the .308, however, the .284 case has a body diameter of 0.500", and the .308 case has a body diameter of 0.471". Both share an identical head/rim. The 450B is limited to 35,000-psi, which is more common in pistols, and lower than similarly sized rifle cartridges. The 450B uses .452" diameter bullets, most often seen in the abundant 45-caliber pistol styles. The 300gr version is rated at 1900fps at the muzzle, and the 250gr at 2200fps.

458 SOCOM : Proprietary. The case head and rim dimensions exactly match the military 7.62×51 (also .308), but the case body is slightly wider and has more taper.

50 Beowulf : Proprietary. The case head and rim dimensions exactly match the 7.62×39 Rifle case, and all dimensions from the lower part of the case matches the 50-Action Express (50 AE), which can be described as a .44-Magnum cartridge that has had the body of the case expanded to 50-caliber while leaving the head intact. However, the 50 Beowulf case is longer than the 50AE, so the 50AE cases cannot be used as a donor.

Note about donor cases : The 7.62×51 military cartridge the civilian version is the .308 cartridge. Since its dimensions are taken from the 30-06 cartridge from the 1906 US Army cartridge, the lower half of these case dimensions have been used for designing the .243 Winchester, 25–06, .270 Winchester, .280 Remington, 7mm-08, .308, .30-06, .35 Whelen, and others. Any AR-15/AR-10 cartridge cases that are derived from the 7.62×51 can also be formed from these listed calibers. (7.62×51 & .308 are similar in external dimensions though the Brass has different internal capacity and Max PSI recommendations are different & Chambers are different.)

AR-10 :The AR-10 is slightly larger and heavier than the AR-15. It was originally designed to chamber the military 7.62×51 NATO cartridge (also .308), which has a COAL of 2.800" (71.12mm)

45 Raptor : uses the standard 7.62 NATO case, cut to a length of 1.800" from 2.015", resulting in a straight-wall cartridge, neck is sized to 0.452". The resulting COAL of 2.300" is only 1.02 mm longer than the maximum COAL for chambering a cartridge in the smaller AR-15; however, the 45 Raptor chamber pressure is allowed to be as high as 62,000 PSI. This means that the stronger AR-10 receiver and bolt carrier group is needed for shooting this cartridge.

== See also ==
- STANAG magazine, a standardized firearm magazine based on the 5.56×45mm cartridge and similar-length cartridges
- SR-25 pattern magazine, a scaled-up version of the STANAG magazine for 7.62×51mm-length cartridges
- AICS style magazine, an emerging standard for bolt-action rifle magazines.
