= List of rebated-rim cartridges =

Below is a list of rebated rim cartridges. Rebated-rim cartridges have a rim that is significantly smaller in diameter than the base of the case, serving only for extraction. Functionally the same as a rimless case, the rebated rim allows a gun to be easily converted to fire a larger-than-normal cartridge, as most of a firearm's loading and extraction mechanism does not need to be altered as long as the rim size is preserved.

Rebated-rim cartridges are known to be used on firearms using advanced primer ignition (API blowback) for its operation, notably autocannons such as the 20 mm Becker/Oerlikon series. API blowback firearms have straight-sided chamber walls as possible (and sometimes slightly bottlenecked) to contain the cartridge and allow a deeper chambering. The bolt face has the same diameter as the rebated-rim cartridge as it follows along with the extraction claw into the chambering.

== List ==
=== Pistol/carbine/PDW ===
- .41 AE
- .429 DE
- .440 Cor-Bon
- .475 Wildey Magnum
- .50 AE
- .50 GI
- FN 5.7x28mm
- HK 4.6×30mm

=== Rifle ===
- All members of the following cartridge families:
  - Nosler cartridges
  - Remington Ultra Magnum
  - Remington Short Action Ultra Magnum
  - Weatherby Rebated Precision Magnum (a.k.a. Weatherby RPM)
  - Winchester Short Magnum
  - Winchester Super Short Magnum
- 6.5-284 Norma
- 6.5×68mm
- 6.8 Western
- .284 Winchester
- .30 Remington AR
- 8×68mm S
- .350 Legend
- 9.3×64mm Brenneke
- .375 SOCOM
- .375 SWISS P
- .400 Legend
- .416 Hushpuppy
- .425 Westley Richards
- .45 Raptor
- .450 Bushmaster
- .458 HAM'R
- .458 SOCOM
- .45-70 Auto
- .499 Leitner-Wise
- .50 Beowulf
- .50 Krater
- .500 Jeffery
- .502 Thunder Sabre
- .505/.404 Stewart
- .510 Beck
- .585 Nyati
- .600 Overkill

=== Autocannon ===
- 20x70mmRB
- 20x72mmRB
- 20×80mmRB
- 20×101mmRB
- 20×110mmRB
- 20×128mmRB
- 30×90mmRB
- 30×92mmRB
- 55×175mmRB

== See also ==
- Snake shot
- Garden gun
- Wildcat cartridge
- Centerfire ammunition
