= .375 SOCOM =

Rifle cartridge

- Type: Rifle
- Place of origin: United States

Production history
- Designer: Tromix

Specifications
- Parent case: .458 SOCOM
- Case type: Rebated, bottleneck
- Bullet diameter: 9.525 mm (0.3750 in)
- Neck diameter: 10.287 mm (0.4050 in)
- Shoulder diameter: 13.49 mm (0.531 in)
- Base diameter: 13.74 mm (0.541 in)
- Rim diameter: 12.01 mm (0.473 in)
- Rim thickness: 1.04 mm (0.041 in)
- Case length: 40.00 mm (1.575 in)
- Overall length: 57.40 mm (2.260 in)
- Rifling twist: 1 in 12" (most common) or 10"
- Primer type: Large Pistol Magnum
- Maximum pressure: 35,000psi

Ballistic performance
Bullet mass/type	Velocity	Energy
200 Vollmer FB	760 m/s (2,500 ft/s)	3,478 J (2,565 ft⋅lbf)
220 Vollmer FB	740 m/s (2,400 ft/s)	3,261 J (2,405 ft⋅lbf)
200 Strike Force Sierra FP	670 m/s (2,200 ft/s)	2,909 J (2,146 ft⋅lbf)

The .375 SOCOM (9.5x40mmRB) round is a custom developed round created by Tony Rumore of Tromix Lead Delivery Systems. Cases are formed from .458 SOCOM run through a custom .375 SOCOM sizing die.

== History ==
The .375 SOCOM is a fairly new cartridge, designed by Tromix in 2015. Taking a .458 SOCOM cartridge case and sizing the neck down to .375 caliber, resulted in a hard hitting AR-15 compatible cartridge, that has a considerable velocity and range advantage over the .458 SOCOM as well as other big bore AR-15 cartridges. Unknown to most, the .375 SOCOM has a sizeable case capacity, nearly 60 grains, but safe handloading should start near 40 grains. Typical .375 SOCOM loads will launch a 200 grain bullet 2400 feet per second from a 20" barrel. In a short barrel suppressed subsonic application, the .375 SOCOM can be made to easily cycle the AR-15 action, using fairly fast burning propellants such as IMR 700X, Trail Boss and VV N32C (Tin Star). This can be problematic with the .458 SOCOM when barrels are shortened below 12".

Typical powders for the .375 SOCOM include AR-Comp, AA2520, VV N530, VV N135, VV N140, IMR4895, Varget, Reloader 15, and H4895. Powders intended for the .458 SOCOM should not be used in the .375 SOCOM due to their burn rate being too fast for the .375.

== Availability ==
Factory .375 SOCOM ammunition is currently available from MidwayUSA, SBR Ammunition, Black Butterfly, Wilson Combat, and Strike Force Ammunition. .375 SOCOM head stamped brass is available from SBR Ammunition and reloading dies are available from Tromix, Redding, CH4D, Hornady, and Lee. Reloaders can form their own .375 SOCOM brass using the parent .458 SOCOM case, but they must first run the cases through a .375 SOCOM full length size die. Reloading data is available directly from Tromix. Suitable component bullets are available from Sierra Bullets, Vollmer Bullets, Hawk Bullets, Maker Bullets, and Fury Bullets. The .375 SOCOM feeds from most GI-type 5.56 M16 magazines, however Magpul P-Mags are not recommended. Thirty round 5.56 magazines hold 10 rounds of .375 SOCOM ammunition and 40 round 5.56 magazines hold 14.

== See also ==
- List of AR platform cartridges
- List of rebated rim cartridges
- List of rifle cartridges
- 11 mm caliber
- .458 Winchester Magnum
- .50 Beowulf
- .50 Alaskan
