= Wilson Combat =

American firearms manufacturer

- Type: Private
- Industry: Firearms
- Founded: 1977; 49 years ago
- Founder: Bill Wilson
- Headquarters: Berryville, Arkansas, U.S.
- Area served: Worldwide
- Products: Custom M1911-A1 pistols, AR-15 style rifles, tactical shotguns, knives, parts, accessories, and ammunition
- Services: Custom gunsmithing
- Owner: Bill Wilson
- Website: www.wilsoncombat.com

Wilson Combat is a custom pistol manufacturer located in Berryville, Arkansas, United States, that specializes in customizing and manufacturing M1911A1s. Bill Wilson founded "Wilson's Gun Shop" in 1977, starting the gunsmith business in the back of his family jewelry store, "Wilson's Jewelry", on the corner of Berryville's public square. In 2000, the company bought "Scattergun Technologies" and now markets combat shotguns under the name "Wilson Combat Scattergun Technologies".

== History ==
Some of the first firearms Wilson modified for customers were the Colt 1911-A1, the Smith & Wesson Model 10 revolver and Ruger Single Action revolvers. Models like the PPC .38 Special and the .44 Magnum Hunter made Wilson's reputation for producing quality firearms. Wilson originally customized pistols with aftermarket parts from gunsmiths such as Armand Swensen, and by 1983, had begun making his own parts. By 1996, Wilson was building his own M1911 pistols completely in-house. Wilson's handguns have a quality guarantee of 1 in (25 mm) groups at 25 yd (23 m).

Wilson Combat has developed custom pistols with professional competitive shooters, including IDPA co-founder Ken Hackathorn and retired US Army 1st SFOD-Delta combat veteran Larry Vickers.

They also have a partnership with Delta Force member Paul R. Howe. One of the signature Paul Howe models is the Wilson Combat Paul Howe G19.

== Products ==
- Custom M1911-A1 pistols in calibers such as .45 ACP, 10mm Auto, .40 S&W, .38 Super, 9×19mm Parabellum and .22 Long Rifle
- Remington 870 shotguns in 12 and 20 gauge, Remington Model 11-87 shotguns in 12 gauge only
- Customization of Beretta 92/96, SIG Sauer P320, and Glock 9mm Luger series of handguns including refinishing, action tuning and various parts upgrades
- AR-15 style rifles in .223 Remington, .223 Wylde, 5.56×45mm NATO, 6.8mm Remington SPC, .300 AAC Blackout, .308 Winchester, .338 Federal, 7.62×40mm Wilson Tactical, .204 Ruger, .458 HAM'R, .458 SOCOM, and 9×19mm Parabellum
- Custom knives, including fixed blades and folders based on designs from custom knifemakers
- Accessories for the above, including the model 47 M1911 magazines
- Rifle and handgun ammunition

== Military ==
Handguns from Wilson are used by U.S. military special forces, including Delta Force and Navy SEALs.
