= .500 Maximum =

Revolver cartridge

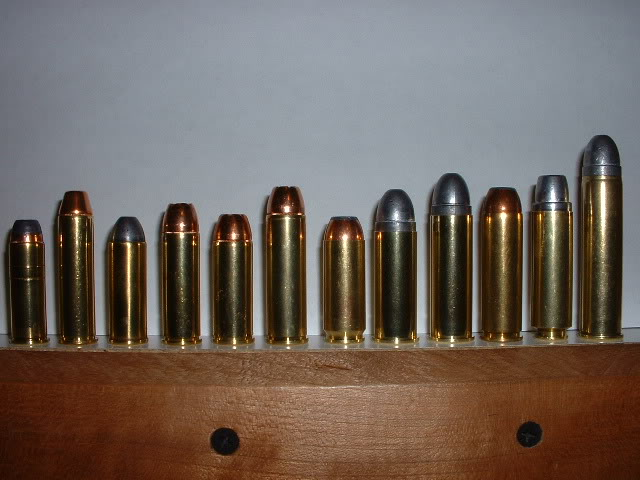
- Left to Right (line by line).44 Magnum, .445 Super Magnum, .45 Colt, .454 Casull,.480 Ruger, .475 Maximum, .50 Action Express, .500 Linebaugh, .500 Maximum, .500 S&W Magnum, .50 Beowulf, .50 Alaskan
- Type: Revolver cartridge
- Place of origin: United States

Production history
- Designer: John Linebaugh

Specifications
- Bullet diameter: .512 in (13.0 mm)
- Rim diameter: .600 in (15.2 mm)
- Case length: 1.610 in (40.9 mm)

Ballistic performance
Bullet mass/type	Velocity	Energy
400 gr (26 g) JSP	1,407 ft/s (429 m/s)	1,757 ft-lbs (2393 J)
407 gr (26 g) LBT; 420 gr (27 g) LBT	1,512 ft/s (461 m/s); 1,508 ft/s (460 m/s)	2,066 ft-lbs (2801 J); 2,120 ft-lbs (2875 J)
425 gr (28 g) LSWC; 435 gr (28.2 g) LBT	1,553 ft/s (473 m/s); 1,467 ft/s (447 m/s)	2,276 ft-lbs (3085 J); 2,078 ft-lbs (2817 J)
440 gr (29 g); 450 gr (29.2 g) JSP	1,550 ft/s (470 m/s); 1,383 ft/s (422 m/s)	2,347 ft-lbs (3182 J); 1,911 ft-lbs (2591 J)
515 gr (33 g); 580 gr (38 g) LBT-LFN	1,388 ft/s (423 m/s); 1,202 ft/s (366 m/s)	2,203 ft-lbs (2987 J); 1,860 ft-lbs (2522 J)
- Test barrel length: 5"; Sources: Tafin Tests, Tafin Tests

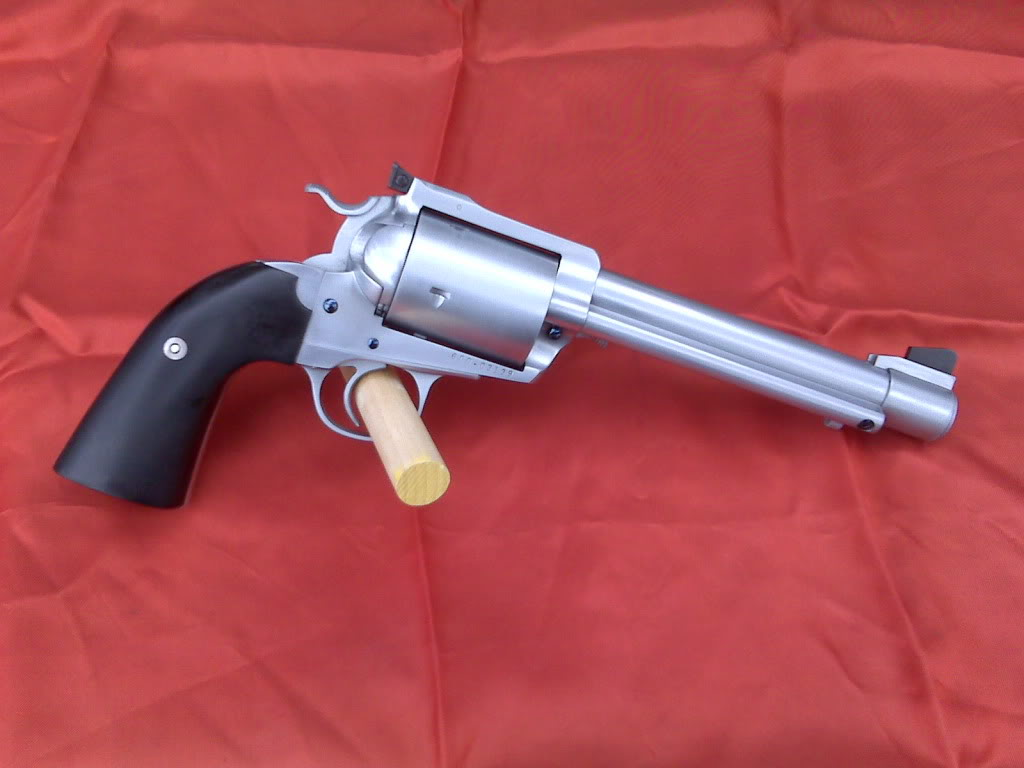
Jack Huntington .500 Maximum

The .500 Maximum, also known as the .500 Linebaugh Maximum and .500 Linebaugh Long, is a revolver cartridge developed by John Linebaugh. Only a small number of custom made 5-round single-action revolvers, such as the BMF .500 Maximum manufactured by Gary Reeder Custom Guns, the Ruger Bowen .500 Maximum manufactured by Bowen Classic Arms Corporation and revolvers manufactured by John Linebaugh or Jack Huntington, are being chambered for this round, with a barrel length of up to 6.5" with no muzzle brake or ports.
