= Centerfire ammunition =

Type of ammunition that is commonly found in small-, medium-, and large-caliber firearms

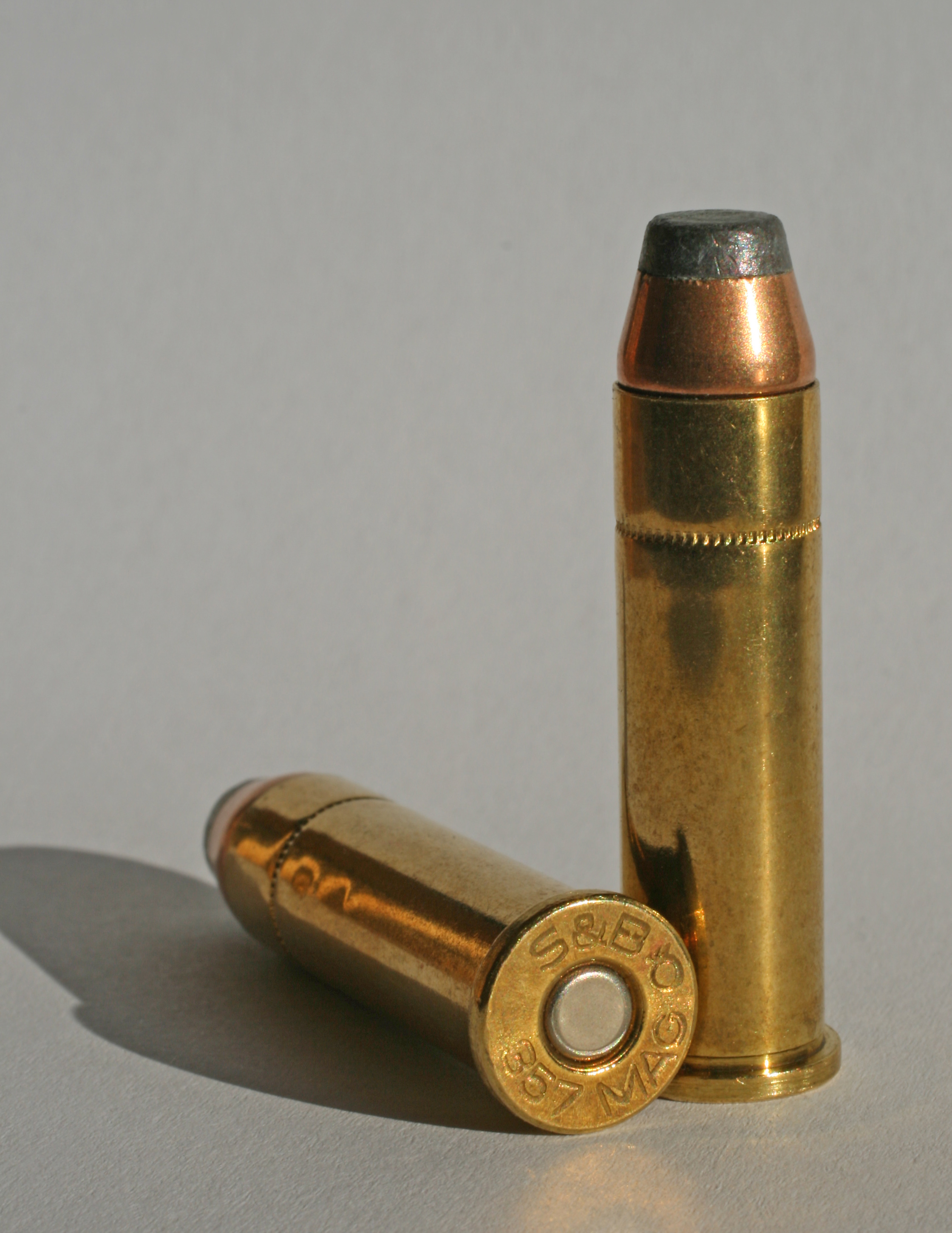
Two rounds of .357 Magnum, a centerfire cartridge; notice the circular primer in the center

A center-fire (or centerfire) is a type of metallic cartridge used in firearms, where the primer is located at the center of the base of its casing (i.e. "case head"). Unlike rimfire cartridges, the centerfire primer is typically a separate component seated into a recessed cavity (known as the primer pocket) in the case head and is replaceable by reloading the cartridge.

Centerfire cartridges have supplanted the rimfire cartridge, with the exception of a few small calibers. The majority of today's handguns, rifles, and shotguns use centerfire ammunition, with the exception of some .17 caliber, .20 caliber, and .22 caliber rimfire handgun and rifle cartridges, a few small-bore/gauge shotgun shells (intended mainly for use in pest control), and a handful of antiquated rimfire and pinfire cartridges for various firearm actions.

== History ==
An early form of centerfire ammunition, without a percussion cap, was invented between 1808 and 1812 by Jean Samuel Pauly. This was also the first fully integrated cartridge and used a form of obturation employing the cartridge itself. Another form of centerfire ammunition was invented by the Frenchman Clement Pottet in 1829; however, Pottet would not perfect his design until 1855. U.S. General Stephen Vincent Benét developed an internally primed center-fire cartridge that was adopted by the U.S. Army Ordnance Department starting in 1868, ultimately being phased out in the mid 1880s.

The centerfire cartridge was improved by Béatus Beringer, Benjamin Houllier, Gastinne Renette, Smith & Wesson, Charles Lancaster, Jules-Félix Gévelot, George Morse, Francois Schneider, Hiram Berdan and Edward Mounier Boxer.

== Advantages ==
Comparison of centerfire and rimfire ignition

Centerfire cartridges are more reliable for military purposes because the thicker metal cartridge cases can withstand rougher handling without damage, and are safer to handle because explosive priming compound in a protruding rim is more likely to be triggered by impact if a rimfire cartridge is dropped or pinched. The stronger base of a centerfire cartridge is able to withstand higher chamber pressures which in turn gives bullets greater velocity and energy. While centerfire cartridge cases require a complex and expensive manufacturing process, explosive handling is simplified by avoiding the spinning process required to uniformly distribute priming explosive into the rim because of uncertainty about which angular segment of a rimfire cartridge rim will be struck by the firing pin. Larger caliber rimfire cartridges require greater volumes of priming explosive than centerfire cartridges, and the required volume may cause undesirably higher pressure spikes during the ignition process. Reducing the amount of priming explosive will greatly diminish the ignition reliability of rimfire cartridges, and increase the probability of a malfunction such as a misfire or hang fire.

Economies of scale are achieved through interchangeable primers for a wide variety of centerfire cartridge calibers. The expensive individual brass cases can be reused after replacing the primer, gunpowder and projectile. Handloading reuse is an advantage for rifles using obsolete or hard-to-find centerfire cartridges such as the 6.5×54mm Mannlicher–Schönauer, or larger calibers such as the .458 Lott, for which ammunition can be expensive. The forward portion of some empty cases can be reformed for use as obsolete or wildcat cartridges with similar base configuration. Modern cartridges larger than .22 caliber are mainly centerfire. Actions suitable for larger caliber rimfire cartridges declined in popularity until the demand for them no longer exceeded manufacturing costs, and they became obsolete.

== Primers ==
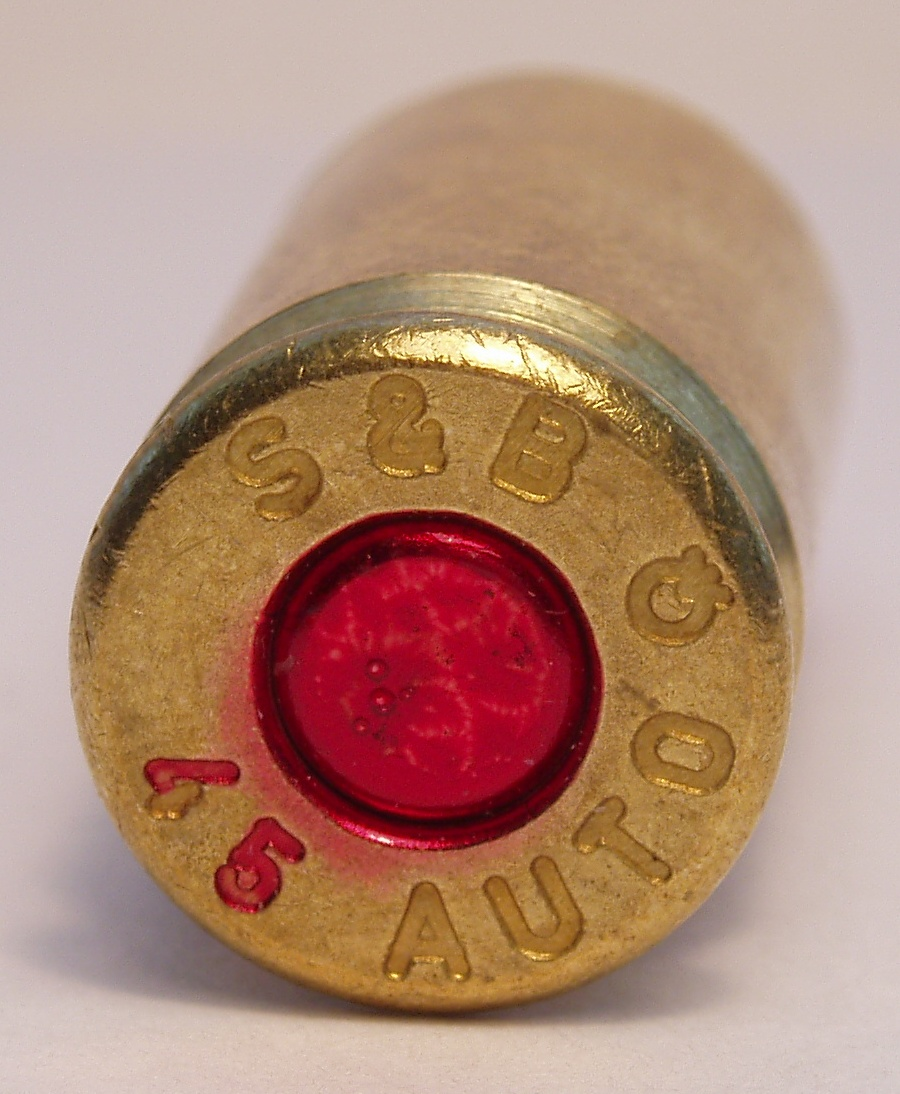
The primer of this unfired cartridge has been sealed with red lacquer to prevent oil or moisture from reaching the powder charge and priming explosive.

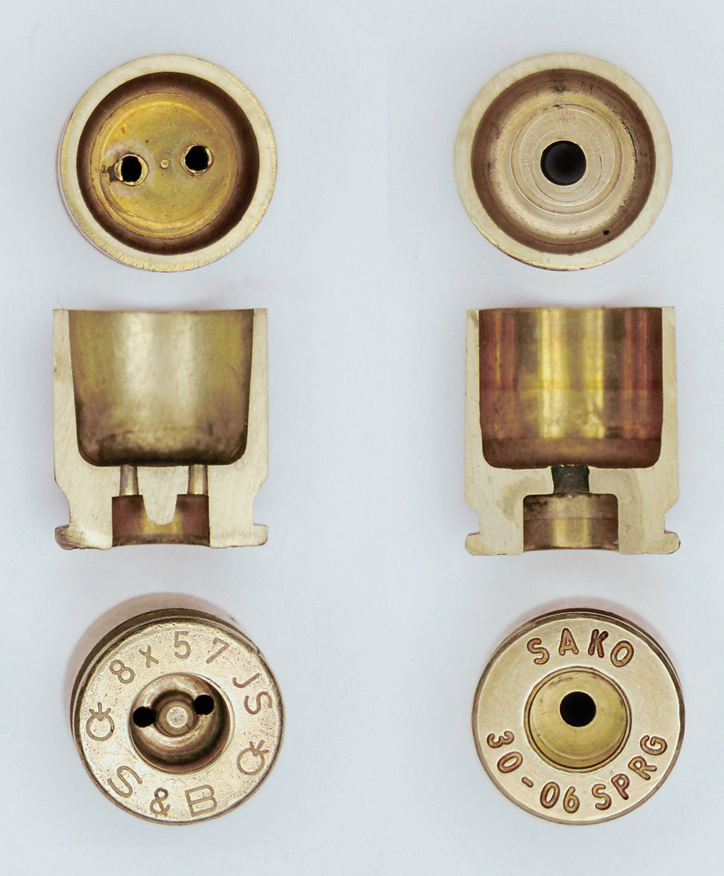
Berdan (left) and Boxer (right) primed rifle cartridges

The identifying feature of centerfire ammunition is the primer, which is a metal cup containing a primary explosive inserted into a recess in the center of the base of the cartridge. The firearm firing pin crushes this explosive between the cup and an anvil to produce hot gas and a shower of incandescent particles to ignite the powder charge. Berdan and Boxer cartridge primers are both considered "centerfire" and are not interchangeable at the primer level; however, the same weapon can fire either Berdan- or Boxer-primed cartridges if the overall dimensions are the same.

The two primer types are almost impossible to distinguish by looking at the loaded cartridge, though the two (or more) flash-holes can be seen or felt inside a fired Berdan case and the larger single hole seen or felt inside a fired Boxer case. Berdan priming is less expensive to manufacture and is more commonly found in military-surplus ammunition made outside of the United States.

=== Benét primer ===
Invented by Stephen Vincent Benét in 1868, this is placed and hidden internally within the base of the cartridge.

=== Berdan primer ===
Berdan primers are named after their American inventor, Hiram Berdan of New York who invented his first variation of the Berdan primer and patented it on March 20, 1866, in U.S. patent 53,388. A small copper cylinder formed the shell of the cartridge, and the primer cap was pressed into a recess in the outside of the closed end of the cartridge opposite the bullet. In the end of the cartridge beneath the primer cap was a small vent-hole, as well as a small teat-like projection or point (this was to be known as an anvil later on) fashioned from the case, such that the firing pin could crush the primer against the anvil and ignite the propellant. This system worked well, allowing the option of installing a cap just before use of the propellant-loaded cartridge, as well as permitting reloading the cartridge for reuse.

Difficulties arose in practice because pressing in the cap from the outside tended to cause a swelling of the copper cartridge shell, preventing reliable seating of the cartridge in the chamber of the firearm. Berdan's solution was to change to brass shells, and to further modify the process of installing the primer cap into the cartridge, as noted in his second Berdan Primer patent of September 29, 1868, in U.S. patent 82,587. Berdan primers have remained essentially the same functionally to the present day.

Berdan primers are similar to the caps used in the caplock system; they are small metal cups with pressure-sensitive explosive in them. Modern Berdan primers are pressed into the "primer pocket" of a Berdan-type cartridge case, where they fit slightly below flush with the base of the case. Inside the primer pocket is a small bump, the "anvil", that rests against the center of the cup, and usually two (or more) small holes by the sides of the anvil, which allow the flash from the primer to reach the interior of the case. Berdan cases are reusable, although removing the spent primer is more difficult than with Boxer-primed cases. The used primer must be removed, usually by hydraulic pressure, pincer, or lever that pulls the primer out of the bottom. A new primer is carefully seated against the anvil, and then the powder and a bullet are added.

==== Centered single-hole primer ====
From the 1880s to the 1940s, many smaller European armies were reloading their ammo for economical reasons, and for that reason they adopted the system known as either Austrian or after the George Roth factory in Vienna which patented it in 1902 even though it was known from the early-to-mid 1880s, where the anvil had a single fire hole right at its center.

=== Boxer primer ===
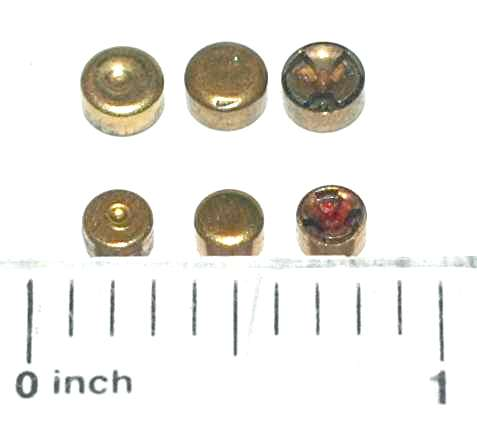
Large (top row) and small (bottom row) pistol cartridge Boxer primers. (L–R fired, unfired, and inside view.) The tri-lobe object inside the primer is the anvil.

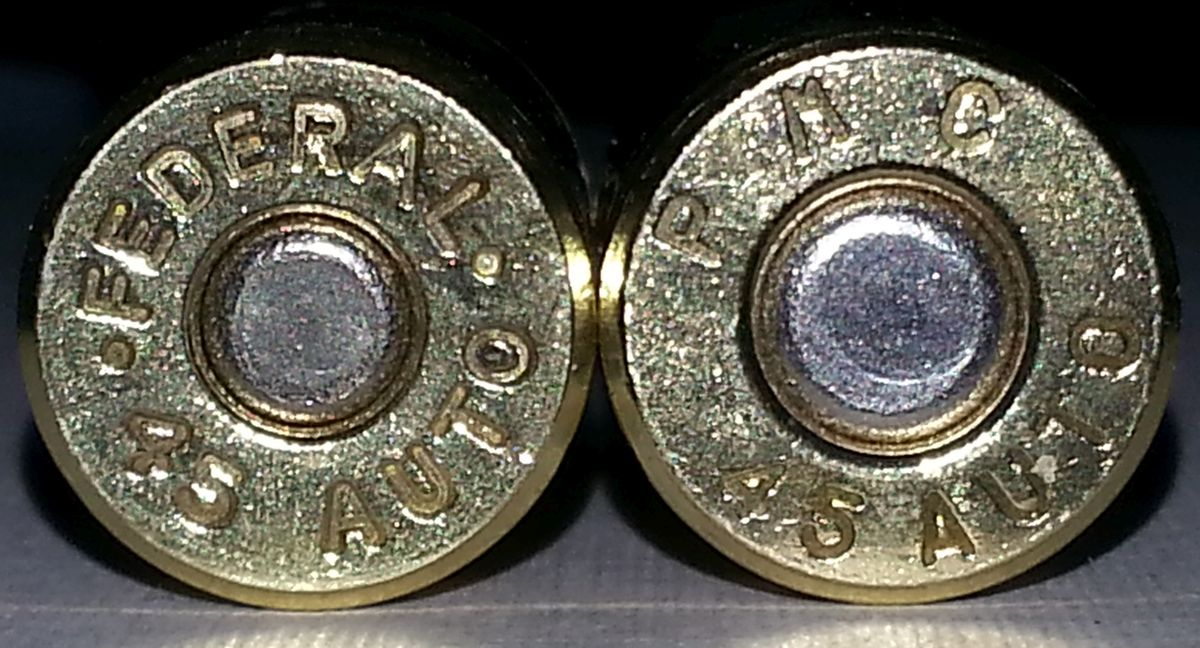
The same cartridge (.45 ACP shown here) can have different primer sizes depending on manufacturer.

Meanwhile, Colonel Edward Mounier Boxer, of the Royal Arsenal, Woolwich, England, was working on a primer cap design for cartridges, patenting it in England on October 13, 1866, and subsequently received a U.S. patent for his design on June 29, 1869, in U.S. patent 91,818.

Boxer primers are similar to Berdan primers with one major difference, the location of the anvil. In a Boxer primer, the anvil is a separate stirrup piece that sits inverted in the primer cup and provides sufficient resistance to the impact of the firing pin as it indents the cup and crushes the pressure-sensitive ignition compound. The primer pocket in the case head has a single flash-hole in its center. This positioning makes little or no difference to the performance of the cartridge, but it makes fired primers vastly easier to remove for reloading, as a single, centered rod pushed through the flash hole from the open end of the case will eject the two-piece primer from the primer cup. A new primer, anvil included, is then pressed into the case using a reloading press or hand-tool. Boxer priming is universal for US-manufactured civilian factory ammunition.

Boxer-primed ammunition is slightly more complex to manufacture, since the primer is in two parts in addition to the pressure-sensitive compound, but automated machinery producing the more complex primers by the hundreds of millions has eliminated that as a practical problem. While the primer has one additional step needed during the manufacturing process, the cartridge case is simpler to make, use, and reload.

Early primers were manufactured with various dimensions and performance. Some standardization has occurred where economies of scale benefit ammunition manufacturers. Boxer primers for the United States market come in different sizes, based on the application. The types/sizes of primers are:

- 0.175" (4.45 mm) diameter small pistol primers, and a thicker or stronger metal cup small rifle version for use with higher pressure loadings in weapons with heavy firing pin impact.
- 0.209" (5.31 mm) diameter primers for shotgun shells and modern inline muzzleloaders, using a Boxer-type primer factory-assembled inside a tapered, flanged brass cup.
- 0.210" (5.33 mm) diameter large rifle primers, and a thinner or softer metal cup large pistol version for use with lower pressure loadings in weapons with light firing pin impact. Large rifle primers are also 0.008" taller than large pistol primers.
- 0.315" (8.00 mm) diameter .50 BMG primers, used for the .50 Browning Machine Gun cartridge and derivatives

Examples of uses:

- .38 Special, small pistol standard
- .357 Magnum, small pistol magnum
- .45 Colt, large pistol standard
- .50 Action Express, large pistol magnum
- .223 Remington, small rifle standard
- .357 Remington Maximum, small rifle magnum
- .270 Winchester, large rifle standard
- .338 Lapua Magnum, large rifle magnum

Primer size is based on the primer pocket of the cartridge, with standard types available in large or small diameters. The primer's explosive charge is based on the amount of ignition energy required by the cartridge design; a standard primer would be used for smaller charges or faster-burning powders, while a magnum primer would be used for the larger charges or slower-burning powders used with large cartridges or heavy charges. Rifle, large and magnum primers increase the ignition energy delivered to the powder, by supplying a hotter, stronger and/or longer-lasting flame. Pistol cartridges often are smaller than modern rifle cartridges, so they may need less primer flame than rifles require. A physical difference between pistol and rifle primers is the thickness of the primer's case; since pistol cartridges usually operate at lower pressure levels than most rifles, their primer cups are thinner, softer, and easier to ignite, while rifle primers are thicker and stronger, requiring a harder impact from the firing pin. Despite the names pistol and rifle, the primer used depends on the cartridge, not the firearm; a few high-pressure pistol cartridges like the .221 Fireball and .454 Casull use rifle primers, while lower-pressure pistol and revolver cartridges like the .32 ACP, .380 ACP, 9mm Parabellum, .38 Special, .357 Magnum, .44 Magnum, and .45 ACP, and traditional revolver cartridges like the .32-20, .44-40, and .45 Colt, also used in lever-action rifles, these cartridges would still be loaded with pistol primers. Virtually all cartridges used solely in rifles do, however, use rifle primers. Notable exceptions to this include .458 SOCOM and .50 Beowulf, which use large pistol standard and large pistol magnum primers, respectively.

=== Shotgun primers ===
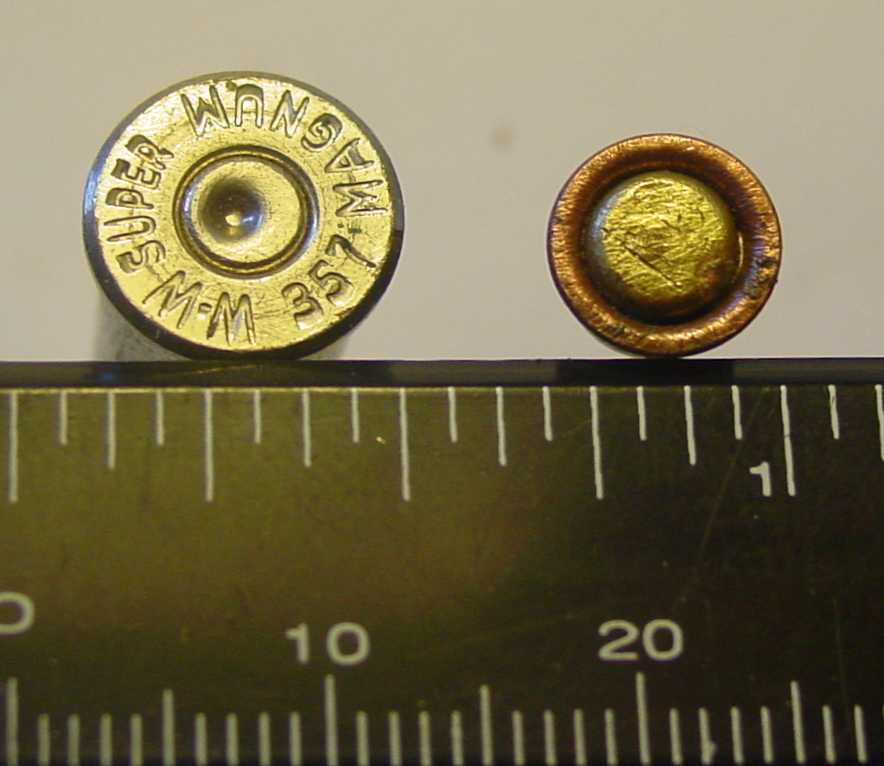
A fired pistol case as indicated by the dimple from a firing pin and a shotgun (right) primer against an inch and mm scale.

All modern shotgun shells (excluding specialized .22 caliber rimfire "snake loads" or birdshot cartridges) are centerfire. They use a large, specific shotgun primer that is based on the Boxer system, in that the primer contains the anvil against which the primary explosive is compressed by the firing pin and deformation of the primer cup.

Shotgun primers are also used as a replacement to the percussion cap ignition system in some modern black-powder firearms, and in some cases as the actual cartridge, notably the 6mm Pipet.

=== Cartridge primers ===
Primer actuated or piston primer cartridges use a primer in the form of a blank to contain the propellant within an empty cartridge, or in some cases as a piston to unlock the bolt and operate the weapon. These types of rounds are rarely used and are mostly found on spotting rifles.

== Primer chemistry ==
Primer manufacture and insertion is the most dangerous part of small arms ammunition production. Sensitive priming compounds have claimed many lives including the founder of the famous British Eley ammunition firm. Modern commercial operations use protective shielding between operators and manufacturing equipment.

Early primers used the same mercury fulminate used in 19th century percussion caps. Black powder could be effectively ignited by hot mercury released upon decomposition. Disadvantages of mercuric primers became evident with smokeless powder loadings. Mercury fulminate slowly decomposed in storage until the remaining energy was insufficient for reliable ignition. Decreased ignition energy with age had not been recognized as a problem with black-powder loadings because black powder could be ignited by as little energy as a static electricity discharge. Smokeless powder often required more thermal energy for ignition. Misfires and hang fires became common as the remaining priming compound sputtered in old primers. A misfire would result if the priming compound either failed to react to the firing pin fall or extinguished prior to igniting the powder charge. A hang fire is a perceptible delay between the fall of the firing pin and discharge of the firearm. In extreme cases, the delay might be sufficient to be interpreted as a misfire, and the cartridge could fire as the action was being opened or the firearm pointed in an inappropriate direction.

Incandescent particles were found most effective for igniting smokeless powder after the primary explosive gases had heated the powder grains. Artillery charges frequently included a smaller quantity of black powder to be ignited by the primer, so incandescent potassium carbonate would spread fire through the smokeless powder. Potassium chlorate was added to mercury fulminate priming mixtures so incandescent potassium chloride would have a similar effect in small arms cartridges.

Priming mixtures containing mercury fulminate leave metallic mercury in the bore and empty cartridge case after firing. The mercury was largely absorbed in the smokey fouling with black-powder loads. Mercury coated the interior of brass cases with smokeless powder loads, and the higher pressures of smokeless powder charges forced the mercury into grain boundaries between brass crystals where it formed zinc and copper amalgams weakening the case so it became unsuitable for reloading. The United States Army discontinued use of mercuric priming mixtures in 1898 to allow arsenal reloading of fired cases during peacetime. Frankford Arsenal FA-70 primers used potassium chlorate as an oxidizer for lead(II) thiocyanate, to increase the sensitivity of potassium chlorate, and antimony trisulfide, as an abrasive, with minor amounts of trinitrotoluene. These corrosive primers leave a residue of potassium chloride salt in the bore after a cartridge is fired. These hygroscopic salt crystals will hold moisture from a humid atmosphere and cause rusting. These corrosive primers can cause serious damage to the gun unless the barrel and action are cleaned carefully after firing.

Civilian ammunition manufacturers began offering non-corrosive primers in the 1920s, but most military ammunition continued to use corrosive priming mixtures of established reliability. The various proprietary priming formulations used by different manufacturers produced some significantly different ignition properties until the United States issued military specifications for non-corrosive primers for 7.62×51mm NATO cartridge production. The PA-101 primers developed at Picatinny Arsenal used about 50% lead styphnate with lesser amounts of barium nitrate, antimony trisulfide, powdered aluminum and a tetrazine compound. Most United States manufacturers adopted the PA-101 military standard for their civilian production of Boxer primers. Manufacturers subsequently offered more powerful magnum primers for uniform ignition of civilian long-range or big-game cartridges with significantly greater powder capacity than required for standard infantry weapons.

Other explosives used in primers can include lead azide, potassium perchlorate, or diazodinitrophenol (DDNP). New on the market in the late 1990s are lead-free primers (see green bullet), to address concerns over the lead and other heavy-metal compounds found in older primers. The heavy metals, while small in quantity, are released in the form of a very fine soot. Some indoor firing ranges are moving to ban primers containing heavy metals due to their toxicity. Lead-free primers were originally less sensitive and had a greater moisture sensitivity and correspondingly shorter shelf life than normal noncorrosive primers. Since their introduction, lead-free primers have become better in their performance compared to early lead free primers. Tests comparing lead-free primers to lead-based primers conducted by the US Department of Defense (approx 2006), exposed significant differences (at the time) in reliability between the two primer types, when used in 7.62×51mm ammunition. In these tests, lead-free primers were proven to be not as reliable as lead-based primers. The lead-free primers exhibited poor performance as far as peak blast pressure, which consequently resulted in poor ignition. Popularity of non-corrosive alternatives is still low, as primer reliability is paramount. Most lead-free primers are sourced through Russia (MUrom?)or South Korea (PMC).

European and eastern military or surplus ammunition often uses corrosive or slightly-corrosive Berdan primers because they work reliably even under severe conditions, and have a longer storage life than the non-corrosive type primers currently in use. Modern Boxer primers are almost always non-corrosive and non-mercuric. Determination of corrosive or non-corrosive characteristics based on the primer type should consider these final headstamp dates of corrosive ammunition production:

- .45 ACP: FA 54, FCC 53, RA 52, TW 53, WCC 52, WRA 54
- .30-06 Springfield: FA 56, LC 52, RA 51, SL 52, TW 52, WCC 51, WRA 54
- FN 57

== See also ==
- Heeled bullet
- List of rebated rim cartridges
