= Edward Mounier Boxer =

English inventor and military colonel (1839-1869)

Edward Mounier Boxer (c. 1822-1898) was an English inventor.

== Biography ==
Edward M. Boxer was a colonel of the Royal Artillery.

In 1855 he was appointed Superintendent of the Royal Laboratory of the Royal Arsenal at Woolwich.

in 1858 he was elected a Fellow of the Royal Society.

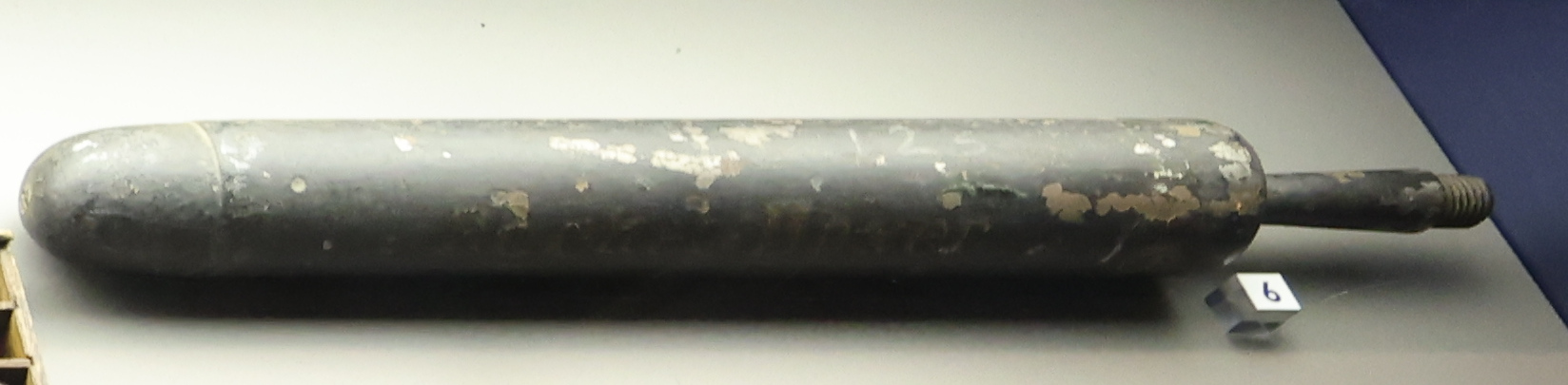
An example of a boxer rocket

He is known primarily for several of his inventions:

- The 1865 "Boxer rocket", an early two-stage rocket, used for marine rescue line throwing
- His 1866 "Boxer primer", very popular for centerfire ammunition. Ironically, the British widely adopted the berdan primer, invented by an American, while Boxer's British design was almost universally used for American cartridges.
- Also his earlier time fuze for artillery.

== See also ==
- Hiram Berdan, inventor of the competing primer
- Rocket
- Centerfire ammunition
- History of rockets
