= STANAG magazine =

5.56x45mm NATO firearm magazine standard

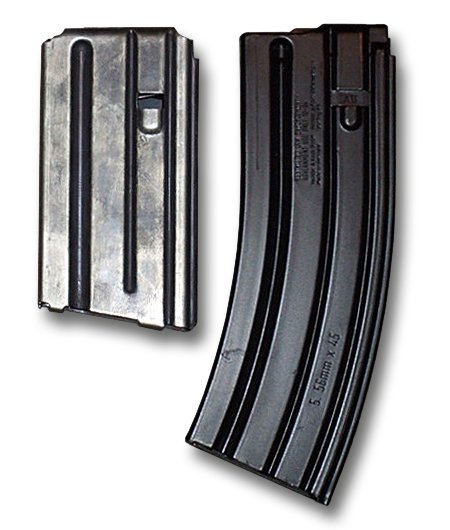
Two STANAG-compliant magazines: A 20-round Colt-manufactured magazine, and a 30-round Heckler & Koch "High Reliability" magazine.

A STANAG magazine or NATO magazine is a type of detachable firearm magazine proposed by NATO in October 1980. Shortly after NATO's acceptance of the 5.56×45mm NATO rifle cartridge, Draft Standardization Agreement (STANAG) 4179 was proposed in order to allow NATO members to easily share rifle ammunition and magazines down to the individual soldier level. The U.S. M16 rifle's magazine proportions were proposed for standardization. Many NATO members, but not all, subsequently developed or purchased rifles with the ability to accept this type of magazine. However, the standard was never ratified and remains a "Draft STANAG".

== Magazines ==
The STANAG magazine concept is only an interface, dimensional and controls (magazine latch, bolt stop, etc.) requirement. Therefore, it not only allows one type of magazine to interface with various weapon systems, but also allows STANAG magazines to be made in various configurations and capacities. The standard capacities of STANAG-compatible magazines are 20 or 30 rounds of 5.56×45mm NATO ammunition. There are also 5-, 10-, 40- and 50-round box magazines, as well as 60- and 100-round casket magazines, 90-round snail-drum magazines, and 100-round drum magazines.

== Issues and improvements ==
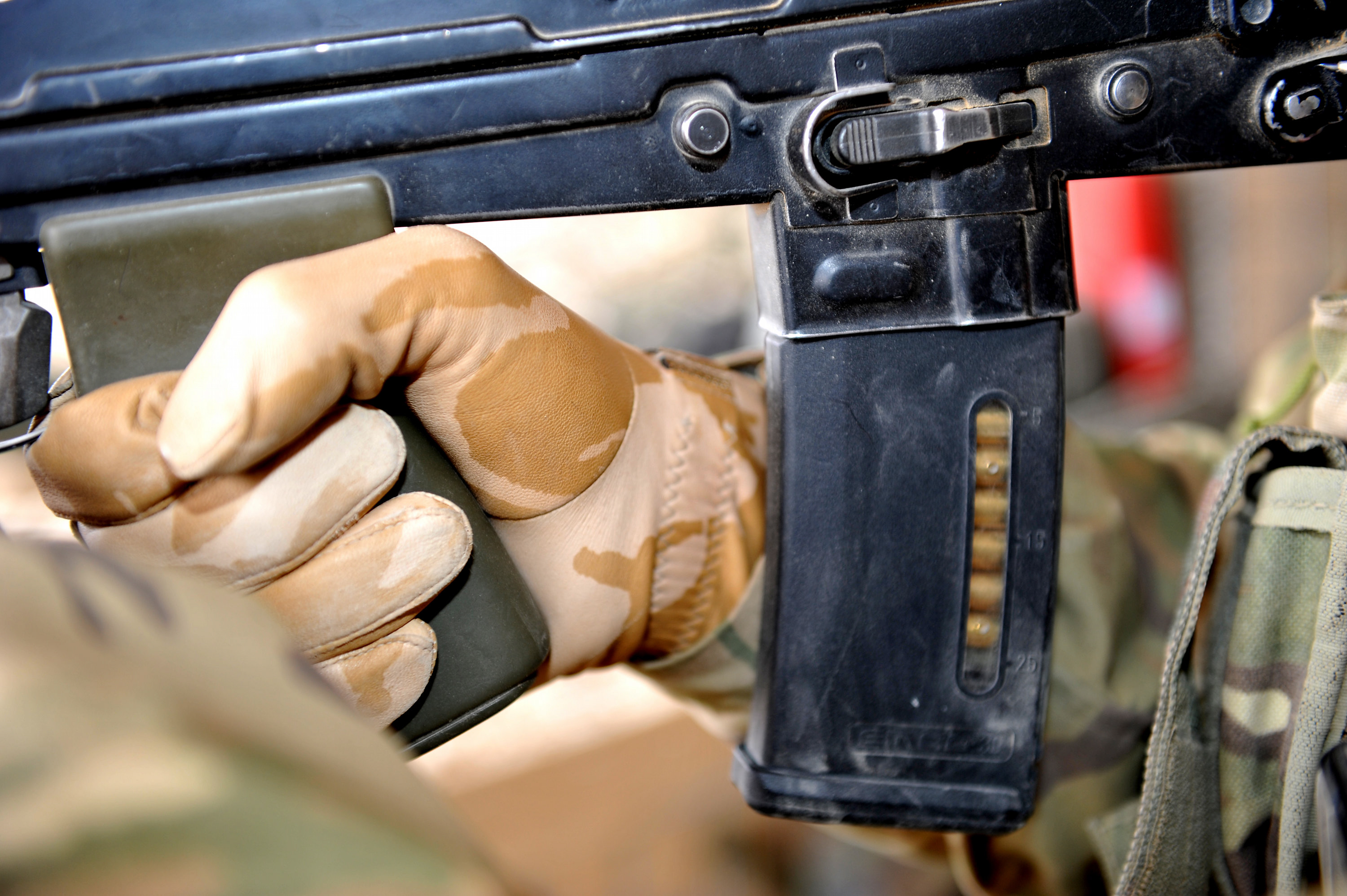
Close-up of L85A2 with Magpul Industries EMAG polymer magazine with clear viewing window

The STANAG magazine, while relatively compact compared to other types of 5.56×45mm NATO box magazines, has often been criticized for a perceived lack of durability and a tendency to malfunction unless treated with a level of care that may not be practical under combat conditions. Because STANAG 4179 is only a dimensional standard, production quality from manufacturer to manufacturer is not uniform.

As a result, in March 2009, the U.S. military began to accept delivery of improved STANAG magazines.

ARDEC began development of a new magazine design in July 2013 to address feeding issues of older designs with the new M855A1 Enhanced Performance Round. It was first made public in 2014 and completed development in mid-2016 as the Enhanced Performance Magazine. The magazine uses a blue follower and a tan body which presents the rounds with a better angle to the weapon's feedway, preventing the hardened steel tip of the EPR from contacting the aluminum feed ramp of the M4 carbine, increasing mean rounds between stoppage by 300%.

== Other cartridges ==
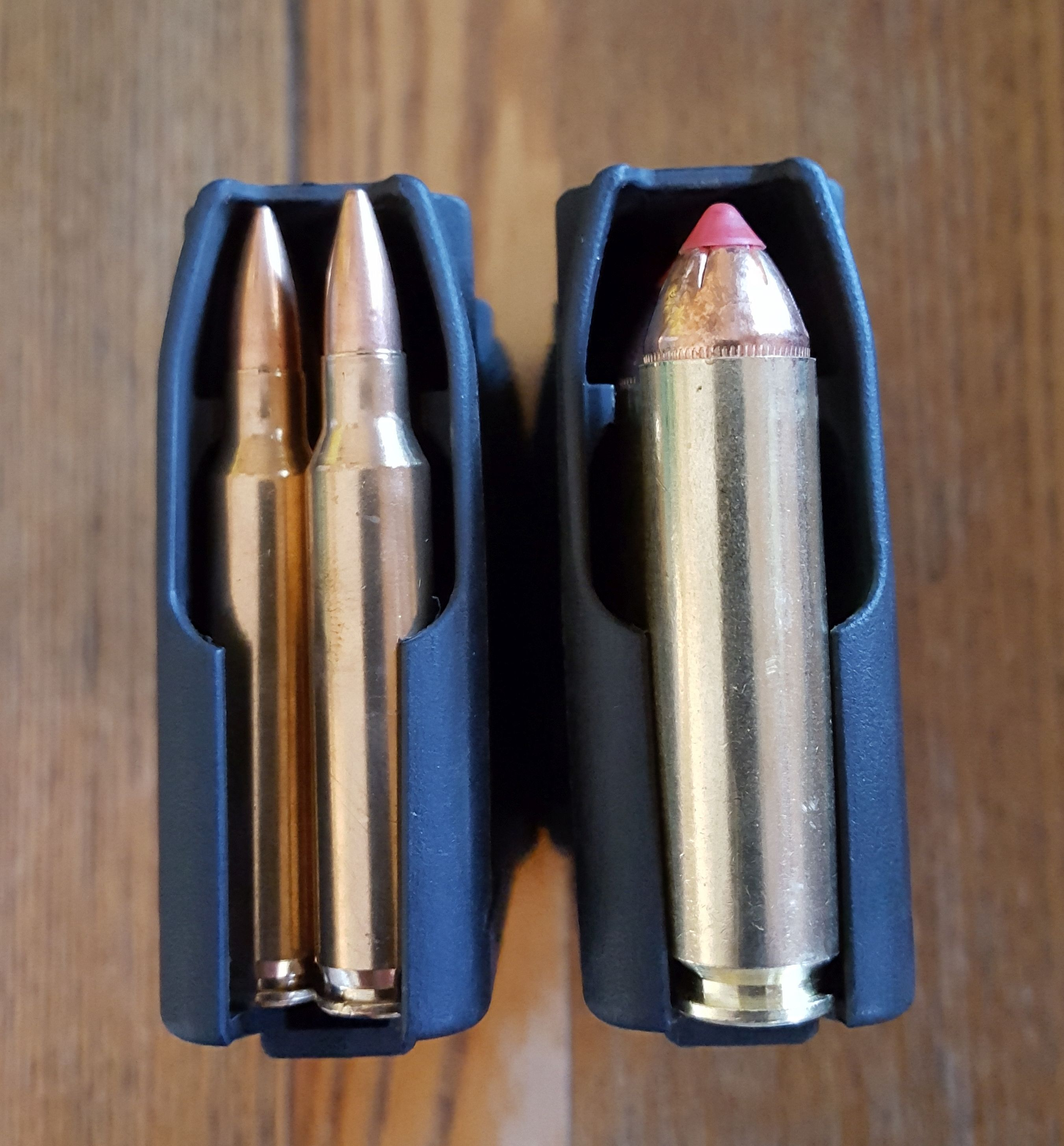
STANAG magazines loaded with .223 Rem (left) and .450 Bushmaster (right)

Over the years different cartridges that fit into the STANAG magazine emerged, some rounds like .300 AAC Blackout have the same rim diameter as .223 Remington and only require a barrel change to be used in firearms that were previously using .223 Remington. Some large caliber cartridges require replacing the magazine follower for single-stack loading, while very large cartridges such as the 50 Beowulf also requires minor modifications to the front of the magazine to ensure proper feeding.

Cartridge	Requires modification to the magazine	Capacity in 30 round magazine	Rim diameter
.223 Remington	no	30	9.6 mm (0.38 in)
.300 AAC Blackout	no	30	9.6 mm (0.38 in)
6×45mm	no	30	9.6 mm (0.38 in)
.450 Bushmaster	Single stack follower	9	12 mm (0.47 in)
.458 SOCOM	Single stack follower	10	12 mm (0.47 in)
.50 Beowulf	Yes	10	11.3 mm (0.44 in)
6.5mm Grendel	no	26	11.3 mm (0.44 in)

== Loading tools ==
Loading a STANAG magazine, particularly one with a large capacity and a corresponding high spring pressure pushing the rounds to the top of the magazine, can be quite difficult. A number of devices are available to make this task simpler. These are sometimes called speedloaders but are more commonly known as magazine loaders, stripper clips, spoons, or stripper clip guides. There are a wide range of both commercial and military type loading tools available for STANAG magazines. For example; draft STANAG 4181 is a type of stripper clip and guide tool proposed for standardization based on the USGI M16 rifle stripper clips and guide tools.

=== Gallery ===
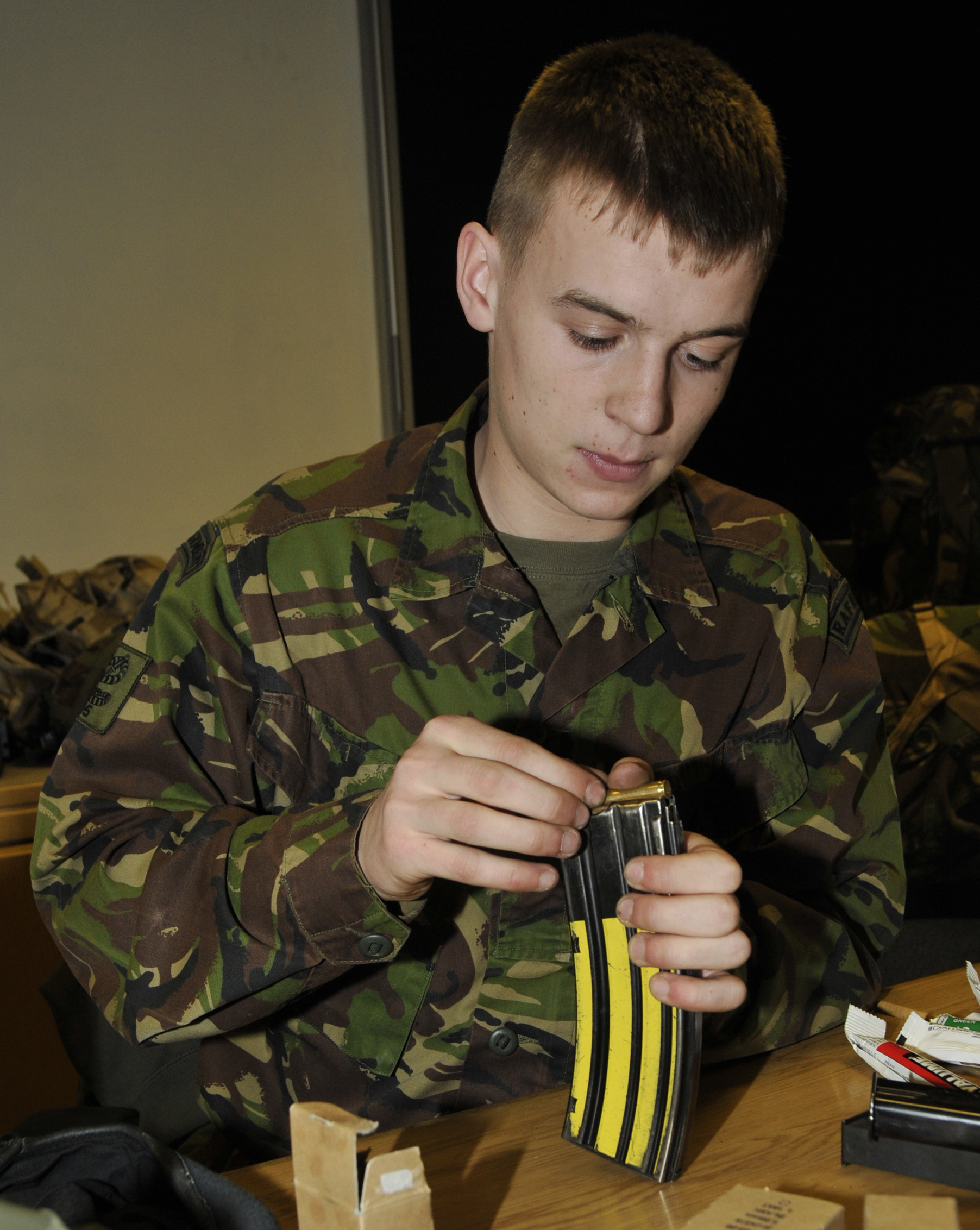
Manually loading a magazine with individual rounds.

STANAG guide tools and stripper clip filled with 5.56mm NATO ammo.

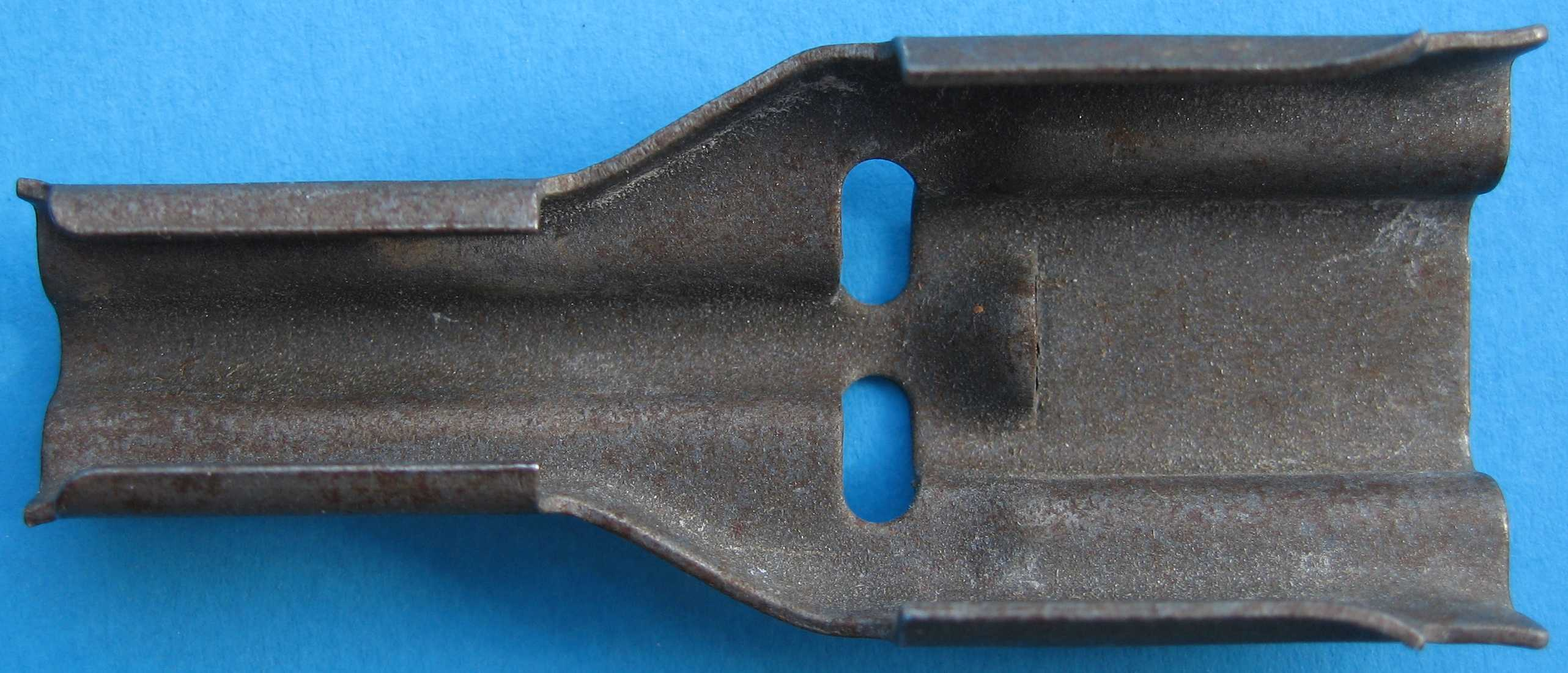
Close-up of STANAG loading guide tool.

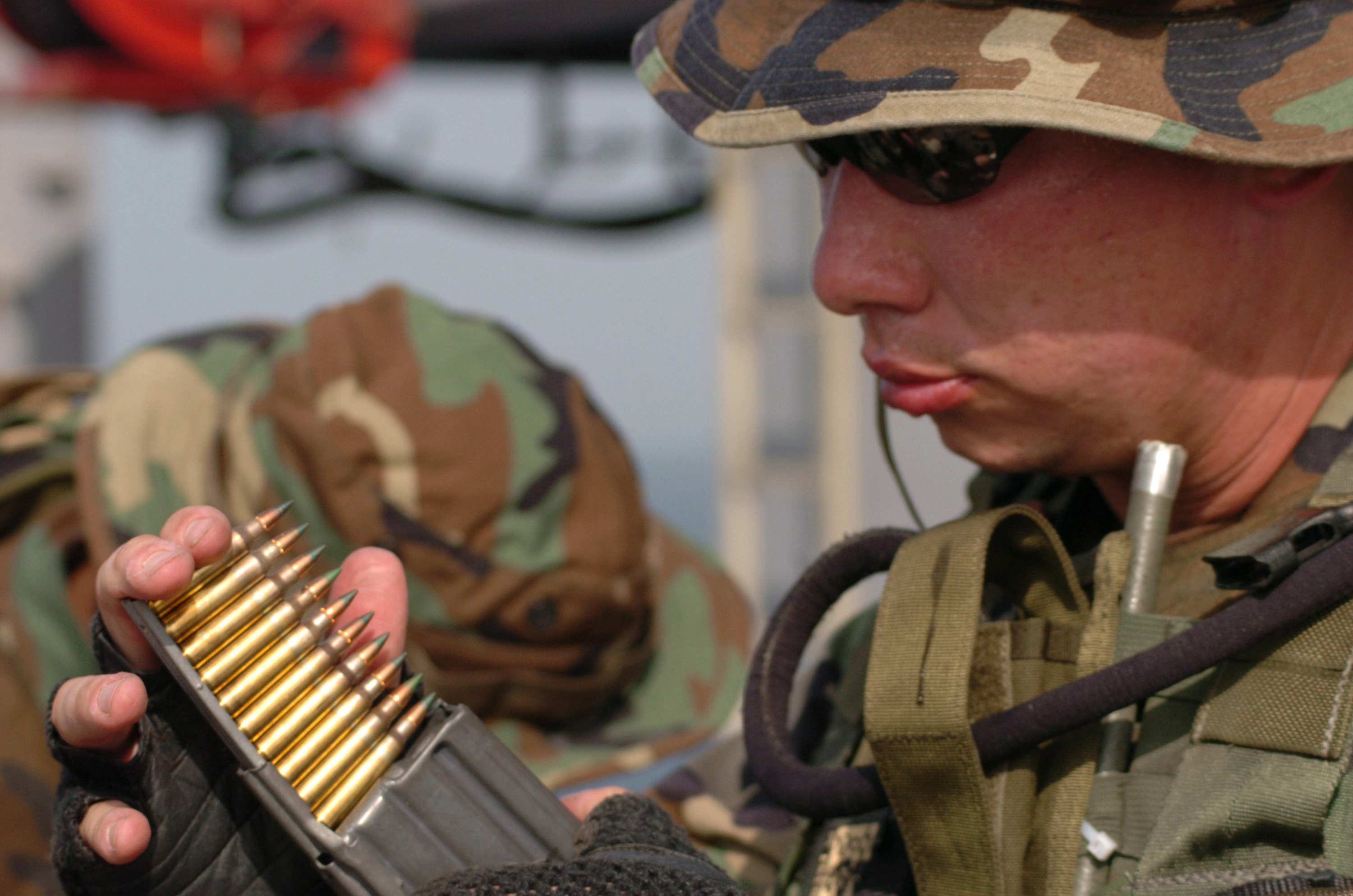
Loading a magazine with STANAG stripper clip and guide tool.

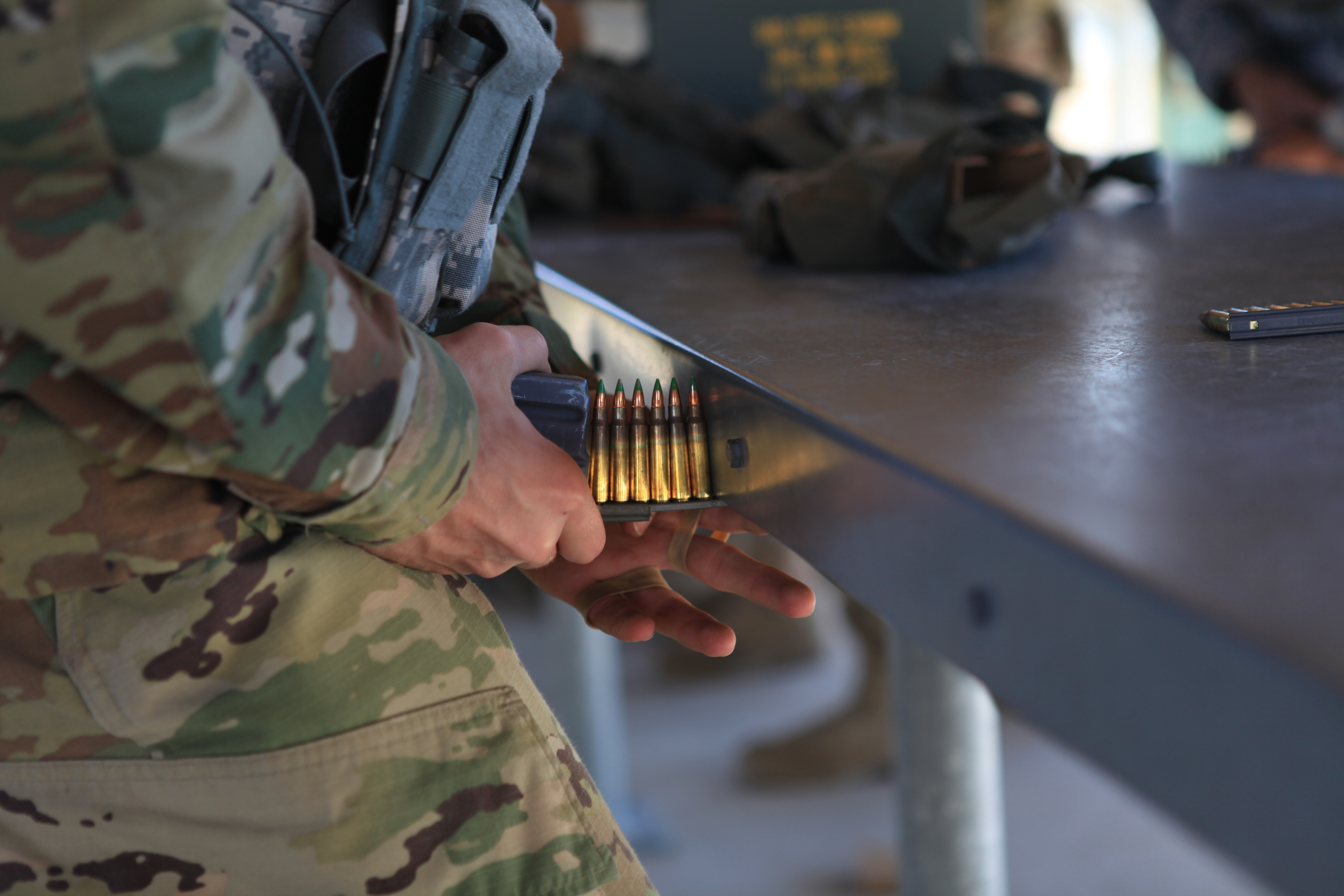
Ditto, with stripper clip pressed against a hard surface to load the magazine more quickly.

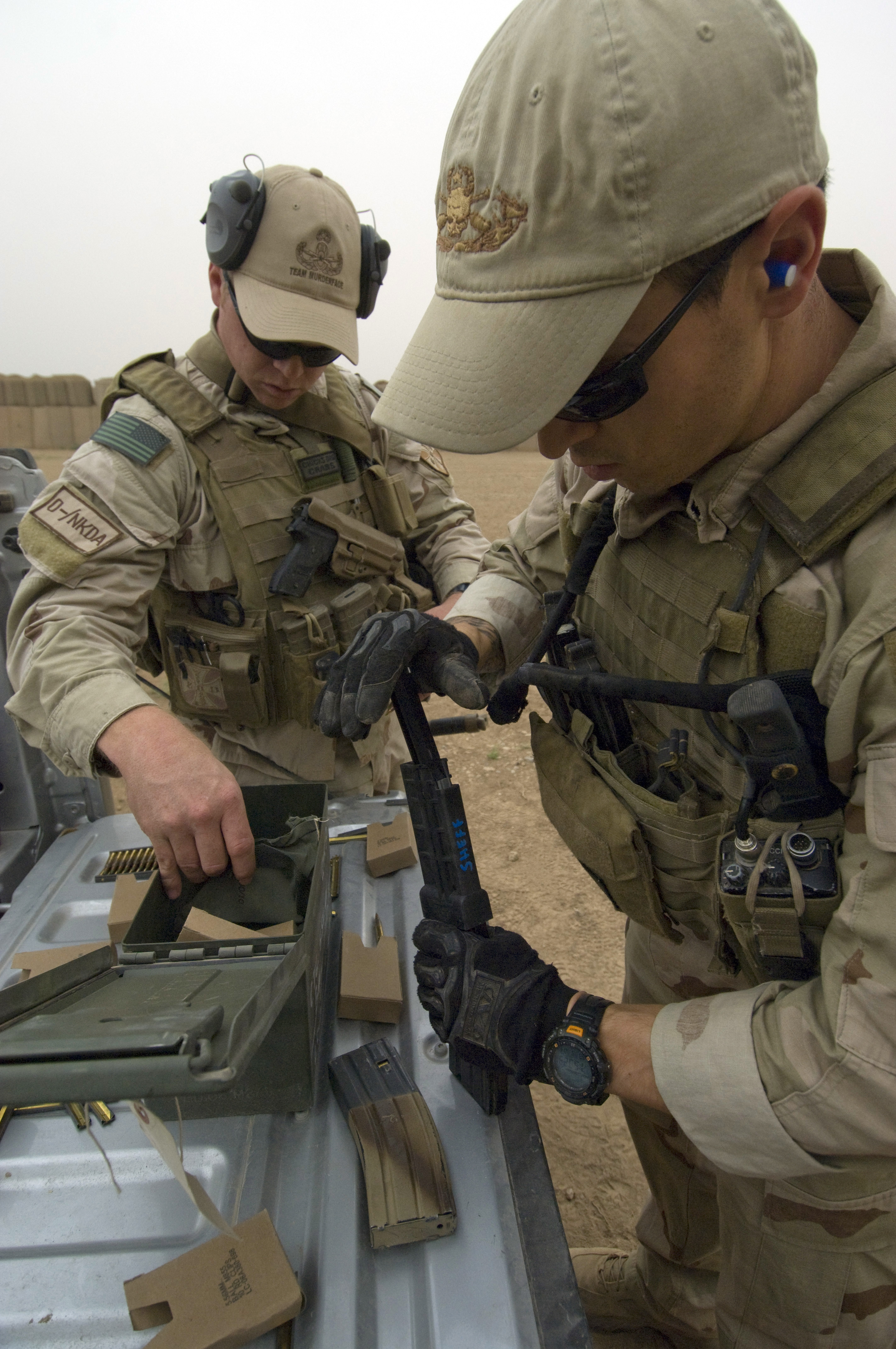
Loading a magazine with loading tool.

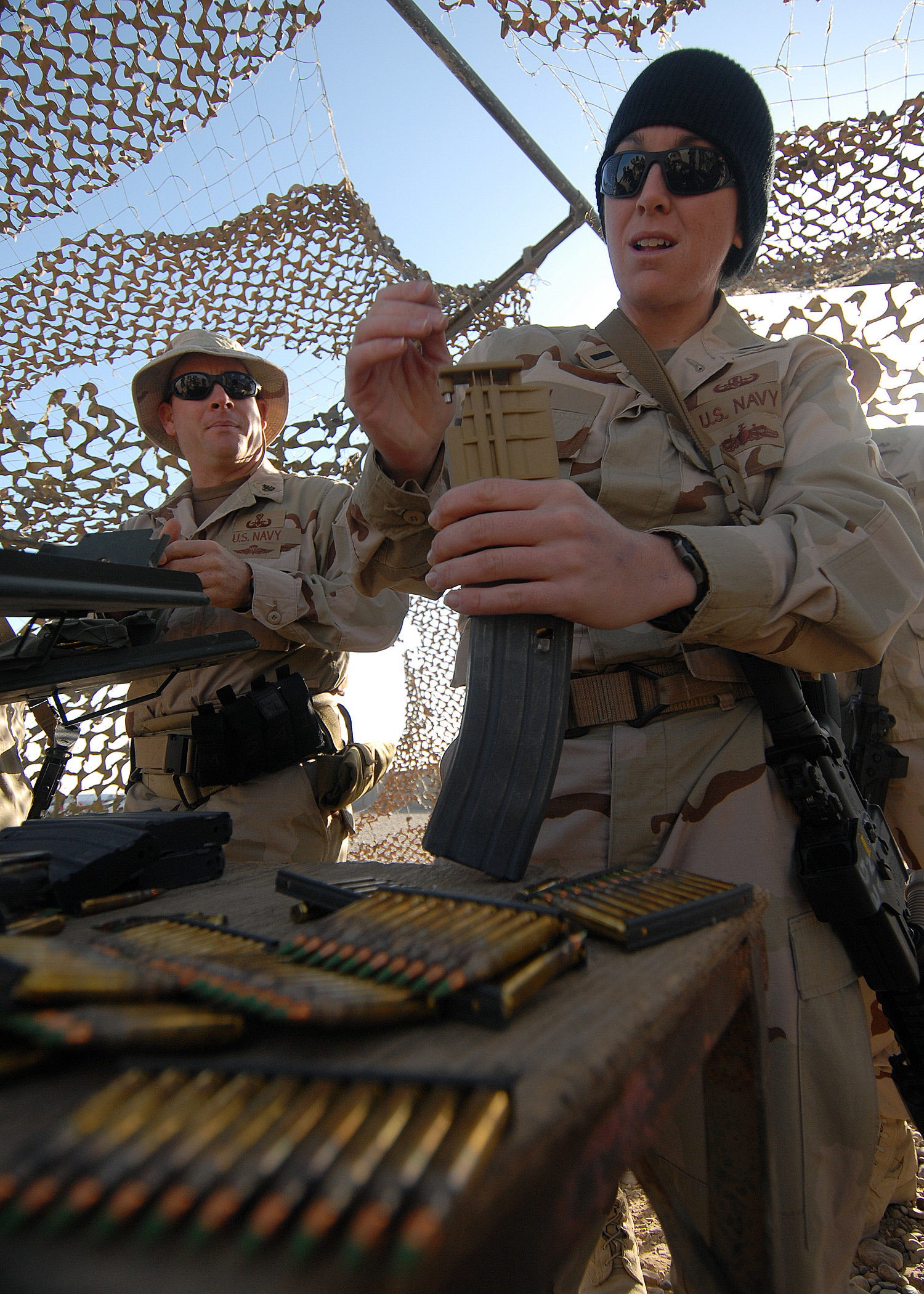
Loading a magazine with an alternative style of loading tool.

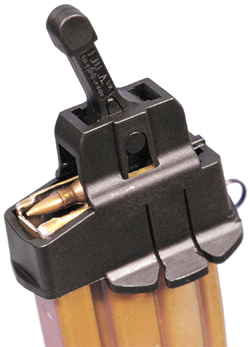
M-16 / AR-15 LULA magazine loader and unloader.

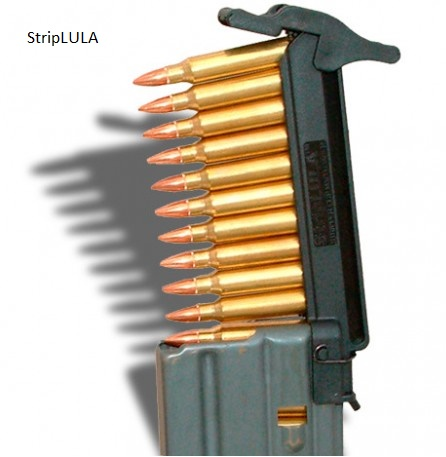
StripLULA loading tool.

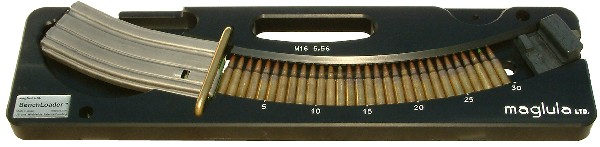
BenchLoader heavy-duty magazine loader.

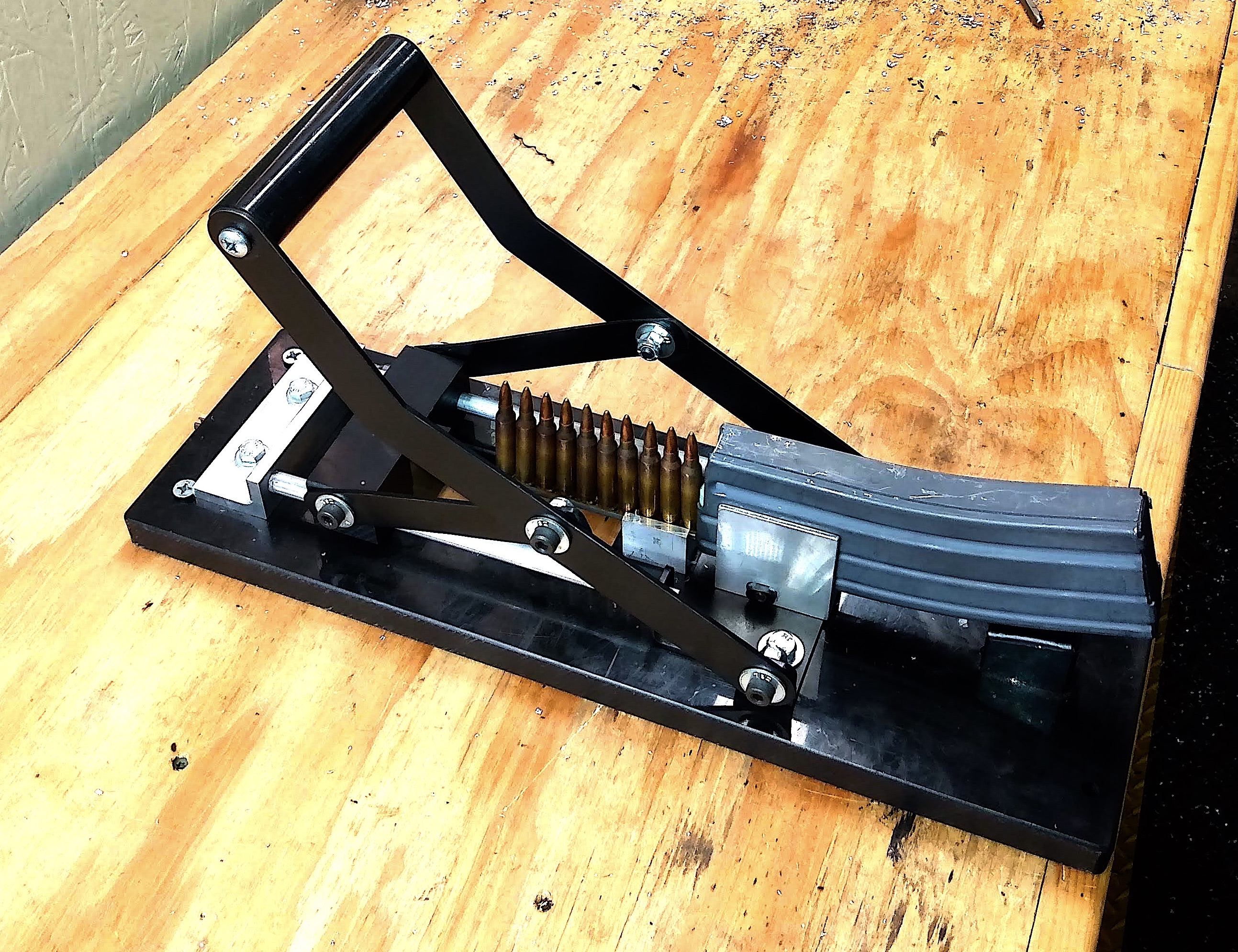
Trijent Mech-loader for high volume loading

== See also ==
- SR-25 pattern magazine, a scaled up version of the STANAG magazine for .308 based cartridges.
