= .458 SOCOM =

Rifle cartridge

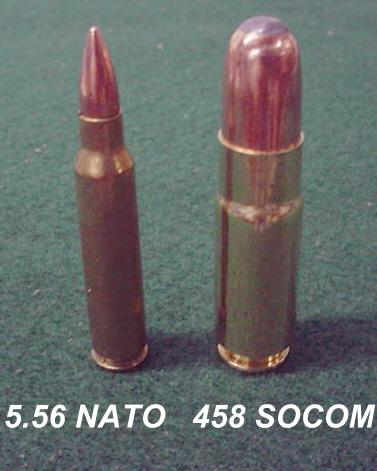
- 55gr 5.56 NATO vs 500gr .458 SOCOM
- Type: Rifle
- Place of origin: United States

Production history
- Designer: Teppo Jutsu LLC
- Manufacturer: Southern Ballistic Research (SBR); Steinel Ammunition Inc

Specifications
- Parent case: .50 Action Express
- Case type: Rebated, bottleneck
- Bullet diameter: 11.63 mm (0.458 in)
- Neck diameter: 12.32 mm (0.485 in)
- Shoulder diameter: 13.49 mm (0.531 in)
- Base diameter: 13.74 mm (0.541 in)
- Rim diameter: 12.01 mm (0.473 in)
- Rim thickness: 1.04 mm (0.041 in)
- Case length: 40.00 mm (1.575 in)
- Overall length: 57.40 mm (2.260 in)
- Case capacity: 3.96 cm^{3} (61.1 gr H_{2}O)
- Rifling twist: 1 in 14" (most common) or 18"
- Primer type: Large Pistol
- Maximum pressure: 35,000 psi (241 MPa)

Ballistic performance
Bullet mass/type	Velocity	Energy
250 gr (16 g) SP	655 m/s (2,150 ft/s)	3,478 J (2,565 ft⋅lbf)
300 gr (19 g) HP	580 m/s (1,900 ft/s)	3,261 J (2,405 ft⋅lbf)
325 gr (21 g) FTX	566 m/s (1,860 ft/s)	3,384 J (2,496 ft⋅lbf)
405 gr (26 g) JFP	489 m/s (1,600 ft/s)	3,148 J (2,322 ft⋅lbf)
600 gr (39 g) RN	304.8 m/s (1,000 ft/s)	1,811 J (1,336 ft⋅lbf)

The .458 SOCOM (11.63×40mmRB) is a moderately large round designed to work in an AR-15 platform. This is achieved by installing a 458 bolt and barrel. The 300-grain (19 g) round offers a muzzle velocity of 1,900 ft/s (580 m/s) and 2,405 ft⋅lbf (3,261 J), similar to a light .45-70 but with a much smaller case.

== History ==
Prompted by the lack of power offered by the 5.56 NATO cartridge used in the M4 carbine and the M16 rifle, the .458 SOCOM came about from informal discussion of members of the special operations command, specifically Task Force Ranger's experience that multiple shots were required to incapacitate members of the opposing force in Mogadishu during Operation Gothic Serpent. Marty ter Weeme of Teppo Jutsu and Tony Rumore of Tromix designed the cartridge in 2000 and Tromix was contracted to build the first .458 SOCOM rifle in February 2001.

The project sponsor set forth a number of requirements including that the cartridge fit in the M4 carbine and be capable of firing heavy-for-caliber projectiles at subsonic velocity using suppressors. During the development phase, various other cartridges were considered and proposed to the project sponsor but rejected as not meeting all the requirements. The cartridges considered were 7.62×39mm, 9×39mm Grom, .45 Professional (which has since become the .450 Bushmaster), and .50 Action Express. At the time, the .499 LWR cartridge was still in the development phase and had not been chambered commercially.

The .45 Professional was ruled out because, in an interview with industry press, the developer of said cartridge stated that steel proprietary to General Motors was used in the bolts and extractor to withstand the high operating pressures. The .50 AE and .499 LWR were ruled out because in 2000 only two bullets were offered in .501 diameter, both developed as pistol bullets for the .50 AE and not heavy enough for the subsonic suppressed role. Research had indicated that a short, belted cartridge called the .458 × 1.5" Barnes had been adopted for use in suppressed bolt-action rifles for use in Southeast Asia during the Vietnam War. It was shown as effective in terms of ballistics, firing a 500-grain bullet subsonically, but not ideally suited for its role due to the size and weight of the platform. Combined with the wide selection of bullets available in .458 diameter, this cemented the choice of caliber.

The cartridge case design was finalized based on discussions with Tony Rumore at Tromix suggesting a lengthened .50 AE case would work well in the magazines as well as be the largest diameter case that could feed through the barrel extension. The initial prototype brass still bore the .50 AE head stamp and this has caused some confusion, as the SOCOM case is longer with a narrower rim. The .50 AE rim diameter was reduced from .514 inch to .473 inch for compatibility with other platforms, primarily bolt-action rifles. The .473-inch/12mm-diameter rim was designed in 1888 for the German Commission Rifle chambered in 7.92×57mm Mauser cartridge, and is arguably the most common rim size globally, as all bolt actions chambered in cartridges derived from that shell, such as .30-06 Springfield, .308 Winchester and cartridges derived from them, share this rim size. The case length was chosen to be compatible with the Barnes 300-grain X Spitzer bullet. The final case design has base and rim dimensions identical to the .425 Westley Richards, although making .458 SOCOM cases from it is impractical due to the high cost of .425 brass. In 2009, Barnes developed a new bullet specifically for use in the .458 SOCOM, the 300 grain Tipped Triple Shock X, also known as the TTSX or TAC-X.

== Usage ==
The .458 SOCOM was designed to be 100% compatible with the M4 platform, requiring a simple upper receiver assembly change. Compatible parts included the buffer, buffer spring, NATO magazines, many aftermarket .223/5.56 magazines, and magazine well. In .223/5.56 caliber, cartridges stack in a staggered (double stack) fashion. However, with the much larger .458 SOCOM, rounds "single stack" without any modification to the standard GI magazine feed lips or follower. A standard 20-round 5.56mm NATO magazine can hold seven .458 SOCOM rounds and a standard 30-round 5.56mm NATO magazine can hold ten .458 SOCOM rounds.

Gunmakers have adapted bolt action and lever action rifles to use the cartridge.

The .458 SOCOM is considered a short to medium range cartridge. However, the current distance record is 1,123 yards achieved at the NRA Whittington Center, New Mexico, on October 10, 2025. Shot from a production bolt-action rifle from Bishop Ammunition and Firearms, 458 SOCOM Hunter MK II, Lucid Optics 1-6 Scope, and production 400 gr Speer JFP ammunition. Merrisa Bishop, the designer of the rifle placed 4 out of 5 rounds on target.

== See also ==
- Thumper concept
- List of AR platform cartridges
- List of rebated rim cartridges
- List of rifle cartridges
- 11 mm caliber
- .458 HAM'R
- .458 Winchester Magnum
- .450 Bushmaster
- .375 SOCOM
- .45 Raptor
- .50 Beowulf
- .50 Alaskan
- .45-70 Government
- 12.7×55mm STs-130
