= .45 Raptor =

Rifle cartridge designed by Arne Brennan

45 Raptor
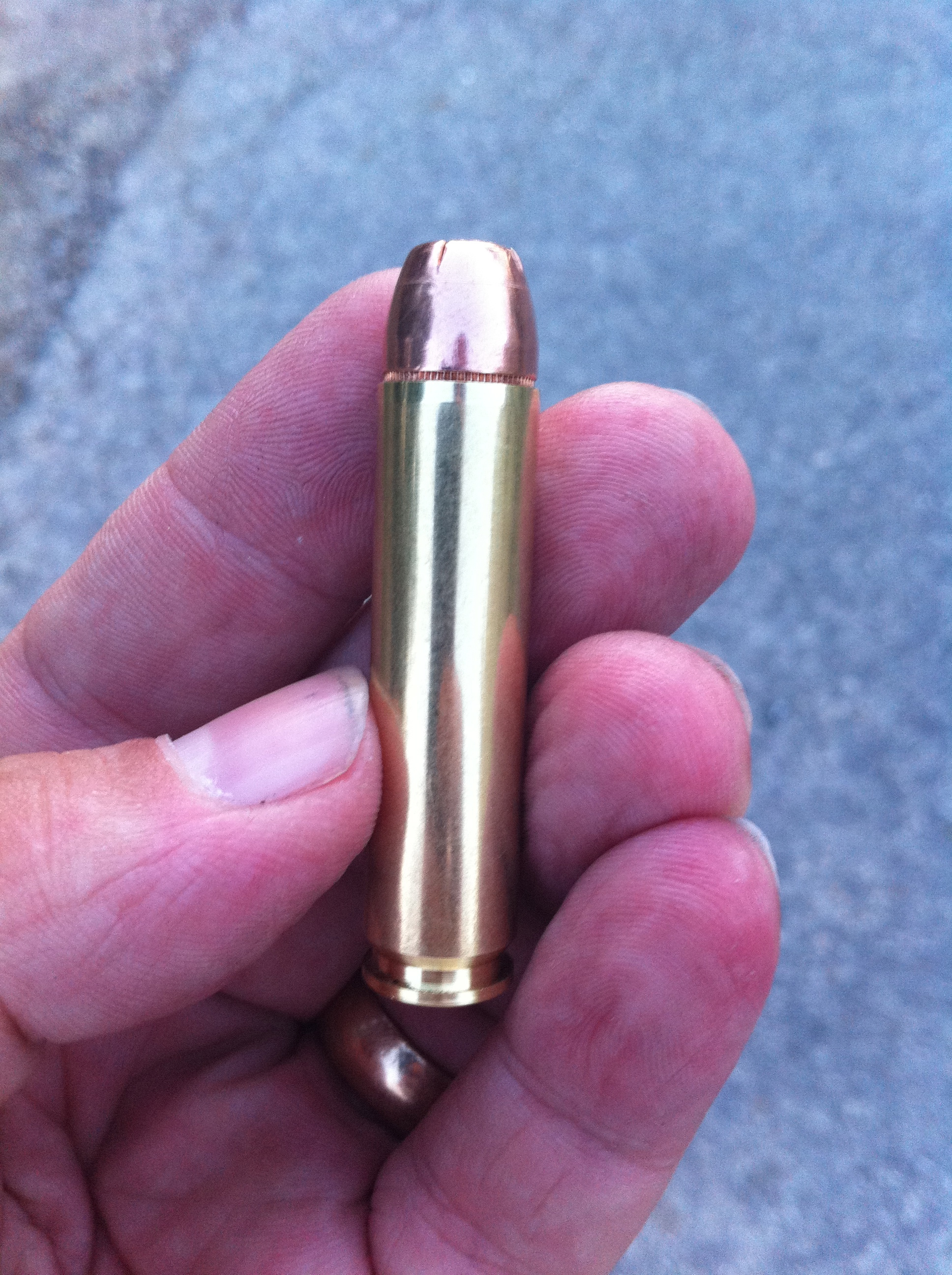
- Photo of the 45 Raptor cartridge
- Type: Rifle
- Place of origin: United States

Production history
- Designer: Arne Brennan
- Designed: 2014
- Manufacturer: North American Sportsman, LLC
- Produced: 2014–present

Specifications
- Parent case: .30-06 Springfield
- Case type: Rimless, straight
- Bullet diameter: .452 in (11.5 mm)
- Neck diameter: .478 in (12.1 mm)
- Rim diameter: .473 in (12.0 mm)
- Rim thickness: .039 in (0.99 mm)
- Case length: 1.8 in (46 mm)
- Overall length: 2.3 in (58 mm)
- Primer type: Large Magnum Rifle
- Maximum pressure: 62,000 psi (430 MPa)

Ballistic performance
Bullet mass/type	Velocity	Energy
160 gr (10 g) Barnes TAC-XP	3,000 ft/s (910 m/s)	3,197 ft⋅lbf (4,335 J)
180 gr (12 g) Nosler JHP	2,800 ft/s (850 m/s)	3,133 ft⋅lbf (4,248 J)
240 gr (16 g) Hornady XTP MAG	2,650 ft/s (810 m/s)	3,742 ft⋅lbf (5,073 J)
300 gr (19 g) Hornady XTP MAG	2,300 ft/s (700 m/s)	3,523 ft⋅lbf (4,777 J)
325 gr (21 g) Barnes Buster	2,150 ft/s (660 m/s)	3,335 ft⋅lbf (4,522 J)

The 45 Raptor (11.5x46mm) is a rimless centerfire cartridge developed for the AR-10 semi-automatic rifle for medium and large game hunting. Compared to similar big bore cartridges designed for the AR-15 – such as the .450 Bushmaster, .458 SOCOM, and .50 Beowulf – the 45 Raptor offers higher velocity bullets, a flatter shooting trajectory and the ability to reliably feed hollow point ammunition.

== History ==
Introduced in April 2014, the 45 Raptor was created by Arne Brennan. Brennan is also known for his prior work with the 6.5 PPC cartridge for long range shooting, which contributed to the development of the 6.5 Grendel cartridge. The cartridge design is owned by Brennan's company North American Sportsman, LLC.

== Design and specifications ==
The 45 Raptor is a straight wall rifle cartridge that mimics the size of the .460 S&W Magnum. Unlike the .460 S&W Magnum, the 45 Raptor has a rimless design that improves its ability to feed in semi-automatic firearms. The rim matches the specifications of a .308 Winchester cartridge. The first 2000 pieces of cartridge brass were processed (skived extractor rim) at Satern Rifle Barrel Co. This can be verified by the .460 S&W head bunting mark on the cartridge case. Barrels also came from Satern Rifle Barrel Co. in the 5R 1-20 twist rate

The 45 Raptor uses .460 S&W Magnum loading data and dies. A .308 Winchester shell holder is used during the loading process.

To convert an existing AR-10 from .308 Winchester to 45 Raptor, a new barrel with an extension needs to be installed. Additionally, existing magazines will need to be modified. The existing bolt and all other parts do not need to be changed.

Brennan moved the feed ramp from the AR-10 barrel extension to the detachable magazines. According to Brennan, this alteration is one reason why the 45 Raptor can feed wide-mouth hollow point rounds better than competing cartridges. Standard, straight-wall magazines are modified by shortening the follower and installing an insert that includes the feed ramp. Curved magazines can accept a custom made curved insert, and are also compatible with the 45 Raptor conversion. Magazine capacity is not altered.

The 45 Raptor is a relatively flat shooting cartridge to 200 yards. From muzzle to 200 yards, there is no more than a 3" rise or drop with bullet weights of 185 grains to 300 grains. This means a shooter can shoot into a 6" diameter circle at all distances to 200 yards with no hold over.

== Proprietary status ==
North American Sportsman, LLC has filed for a trademark on the term Raptor as it relates to ammunition. In an interview, Brennan stated he has no intention of charging royalties for the use of the trademark. However, Brennan stated there will be certain requirements for anyone developing 45 Raptor products to ensure a minimum level of quality.

== Sporting uses ==
In addition to general target shooting, the 45 Raptor is an appropriate round for hunting. According to North American Sportsman, LLC, the cartridge is acceptable for taking medium and large game including hog and deer.

== See also ==
- Thumper concept
- List of rifle cartridges
- .450 Bushmaster
- .458 SOCOM
- .460 S&W Magnum
- .50 Beowulf
- 12.7×55mm STs-130
- .308 Winchester

== General references ==
- RaptorOne. "45 RAPTOR". 45 Raptor.
