= .425 Westley Richards =

Rifle cartridge

- Type: Rifle
- Place of origin: England

Production history
- Designer: Westley Richards
- Designed: 1908

Specifications
- Case type: Rebated-rim, straight walled bottleneck
- Bullet diameter: .435 in (11.0 mm)
- Neck diameter: .456 in (11.6 mm)
- Shoulder diameter: .540 in (13.7 mm)
- Base diameter: .543 in (13.8 mm)
- Rim diameter: .467 in (11.9 mm)
- Case length: 2.64 in (67 mm)
- Overall length: 3.30 in (84 mm)

Ballistic performance
Bullet mass/type	Velocity	Energy
410 gr (27 g) SP	2,350 ft/s (720 m/s)	5,010 ft⋅lbf (6,790 J)
- Source(s): "Cartridges of the World"

The .425 Westley Richards (11x67mmRB) is one of the classic African big-game rounds. It is a cartridge invented by Leslie Bown Taylor of Westley Richards, a gunmaking firm of Birmingham, England in 1909 as a proprietary cartridge for their bolt-action rifles.

Since before 1912 Rigby were Mauser agents in the UK and managed to persuade Oberndorf to develop and produce special Magnum actions for them, other British companies who wanted to compete with their .400/350 Nitro Express big five game hunting rifles had to improvise and use standard-length Gewehr 98 actions, which only allow approximately 84 mm cartridges to fit into the magazine (a bonus was having a shorter bolt throw).

The round was the first in Great Britain (and the first major in the world) to have a rebated rim, one that is smaller in diameter than the case body, an invention which Taylor patented in 1908. This allowed it to be used in converted G98 rifles with standard bolt faces and not have them weakened by widening.

However, it complicated the magazine design: when the cartridge is pushed forward and the bullet rides up the feed ramp, smaller diameter rim dives down and tends to slip under the bolt face (especially in absence of special measures to ensure reliable feeding), which may cause a serious jam. To solve this problem, Taylor developed (and patented in 1909) a proprietary single-stack magazine akin to Belgian Mauser, which similarly extended below the stock. However, many rifles were and are nevertheless produced with standard G98-type flush double stack, double feed magazine, which works quite well as long as the spring remains strong enough.

The rebated rim also allows government game officers and authorized hunters to use standard stripper clips for rapid reloads when culling rogue animals.

== See also ==
- List of rebated rim cartridges
- 11 mm caliber
