= .30 Remington AR =

Rifle cartridge

.30 RAR (.30 Remington AR)
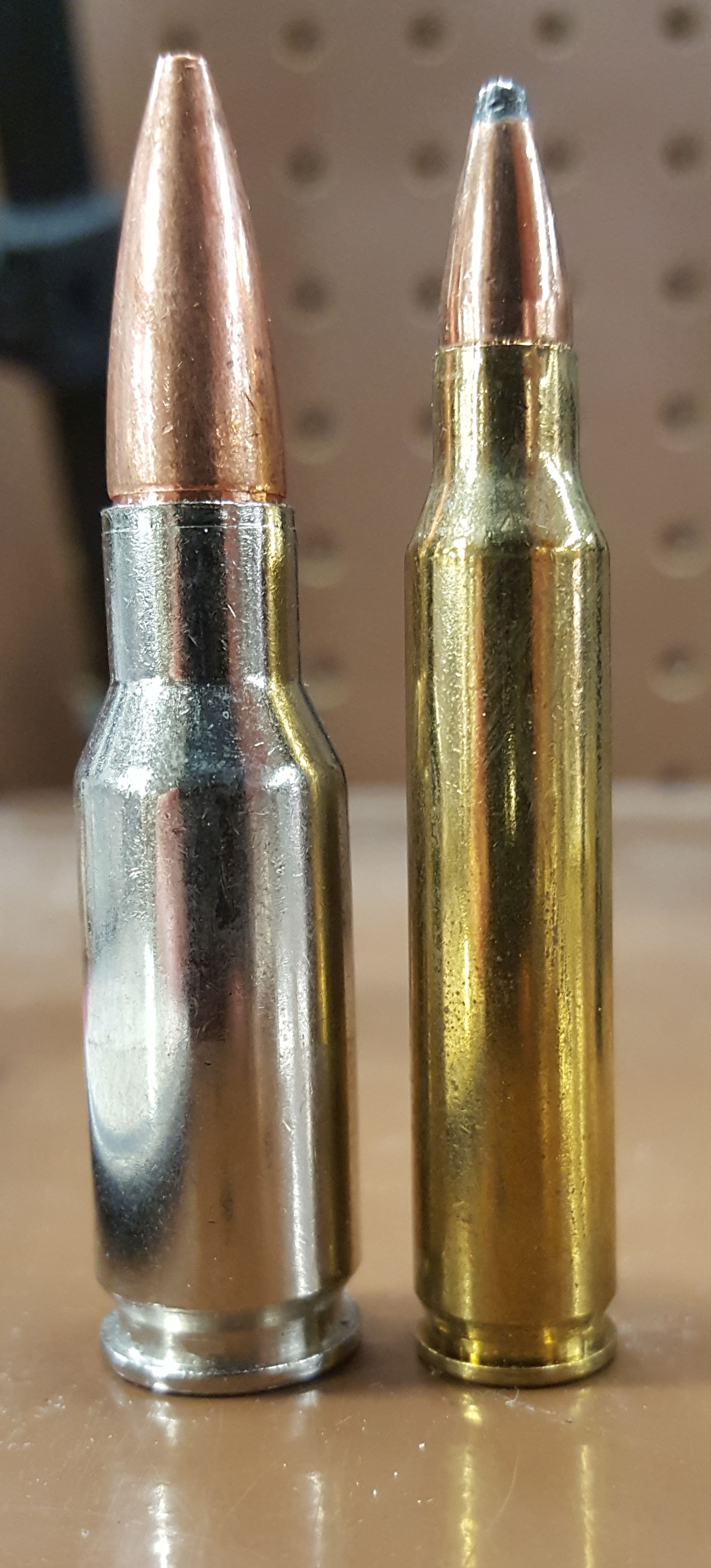
- Size comparison with .223
- Type: Rifle, Centerfire
- Place of origin: United States

Production history
- Designed: 2008
- Manufacturer: Remington
- Produced: 2008–present

Specifications
- Parent case: .284 Winchester
- Case type: Rimless, bottleneck
- Base diameter: .500 in (12.7 mm)
- Rim diameter: .492 in (12.5 mm)
- Rim thickness: .054 in (1.4 mm)
- Case length: 1.53 in (39 mm)
- Overall length: 2.26 in (57 mm)
- Case capacity: 44 gr H_{2}O (2.9 cm^{3})
- Rifling twist: 1:10
- Primer type: Large rifle
- Maximum pressure: 55,000 psi (380 MPa)

Ballistic performance
Bullet mass/type	Velocity	Energy
125 gr (8 g) Corelokt	2,800 ft/s (850 m/s)	2,176 ft⋅lbf (2,950 J)
125 gr (8 g) AccuTip BT	2,800 ft/s (850 m/s)	2,176 ft⋅lbf (2,950 J)
- Test barrel length: 24; Source: http://accurateshooter.wordpress.com/2008/10/15/remington-introduces-new-30-remington-ar-cartridge/

The .30 Remington AR is an intermediate cartridge created in 2008 by Remington Arms to fill a perceived gap in performance on large game between the .223 Remington and larger cartridges such as the .308 Winchester. The design of the cartridge is considered a joint effort between companies under the "Freedom Group" name through a private equity firm and included such companies as Bushmaster, DPMS and Remington itself. It is a rebated rim cartridge designed to fit Remington's R-15 semiautomatic hunting rifle. It was made to fit the dimensional constraints of the AR-15 magazine and is based on a modification of the .450 Bushmaster, which in turn is based on the .284 Winchester.

Remington was the only company that manufactured this ammunition and its components. The cartridge was a commercial failure and has been discontinued by Remington.

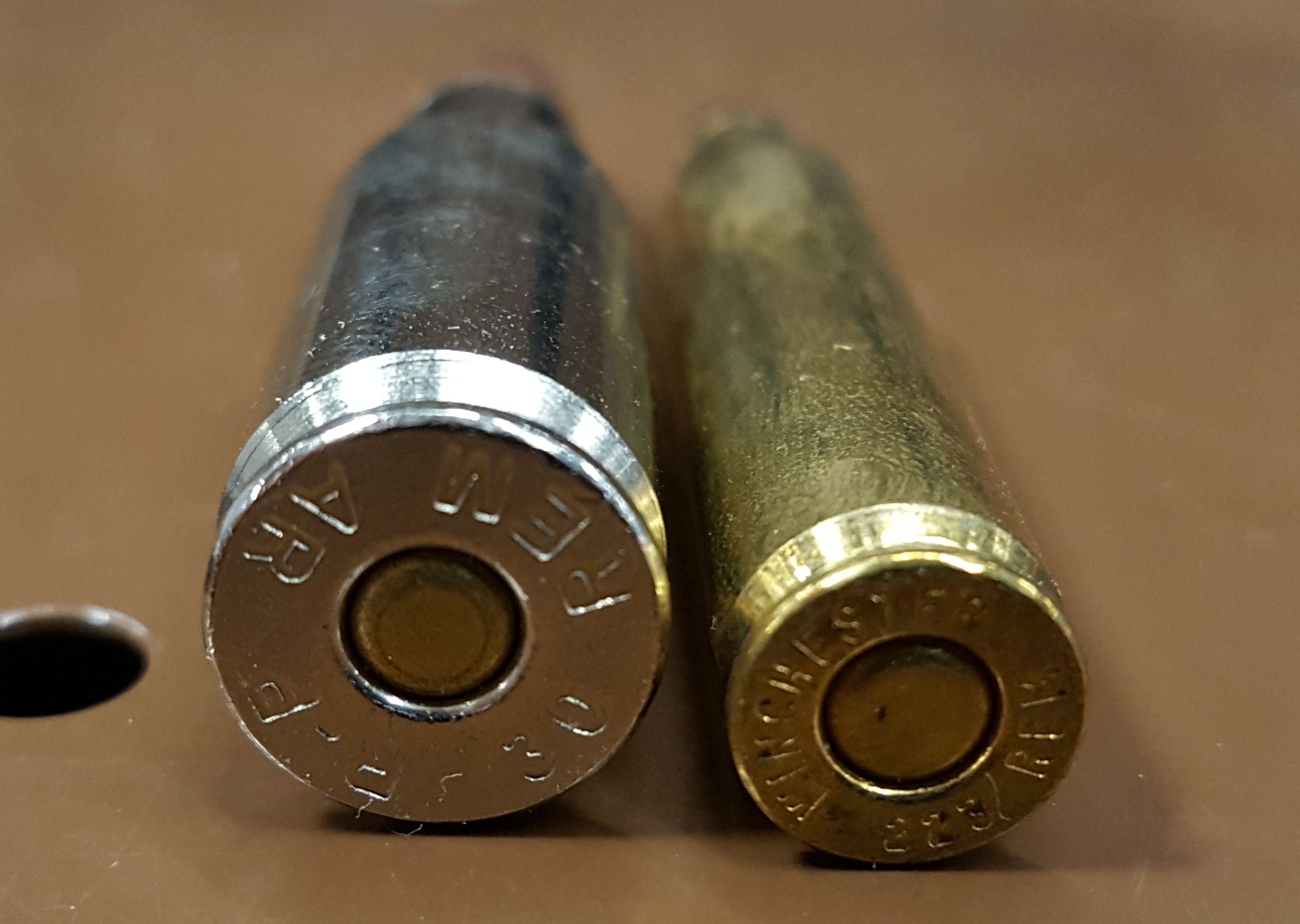
The .30 Remington AR cartridge has a significantly wider diameter than the .223 Remington

== Design ==
Starting with a .450 Bushmaster case, Remington trimmed the length to 1.525 in from the original 1.7 and necked it down to accept a conical .308 in diameter bullet with a 25-degree shoulder.

The rim size is .492 in and because the round generates 55,000 psi, Remington opted to use a .308 rifle bolt in a 5.56-sized rifle for increased case support. The rim was widened from the .473 in of the parent case to prevent the use of a weaker .450 Bushmaster bolt with this cartridge. With a 150 grain bullet, the round travels at 2,575 feet per second (fps).

== Performance ==
Performance tests between the .30 RAR and the .308 Winchester show that while the .30 RAR does have a good muzzle velocity, the energy it is capable of delivering on target at around 400 yards decreases significantly. Combined with the poorer ballistic coefficients of the lighter projectiles (.267 for the 125-grain Core-Lokt), this makes the .30 RAR a cartridge suited to ranges around 300 to 400 yards, although this can be extended with projectiles of higher ballistic coefficient (.341 for the Speer TNT 125 grain).

A side effect of the short, wide case is that the Remington R-15 rifle, which was designed alongside the cartridge, uses a four-round, single-stack magazine.

== See also ==
- List of rifle cartridges
- Table of handgun and rifle cartridges
