= .458 HAM'R =

US large bore rifle cartridge

- Place of origin: United States

Production history
- Designer: Bill Wilson

Specifications
- Case type: Rebated, bottlenecked
- Bullet diameter: .458 in (11.6 mm)
- Maximum pressure: 46,000 psi

Ballistic performance
Bullet mass/type	Velocity	Energy
300 gr (19 g)	2,100 ft/s (640 m/s)	2,938 ft⋅lbf (3,983 J)
- Test barrel length: 18

The .458 HAM'R (11.6×39mmRB) is a large bore, centerfire rifle cartridge, designed for use in AR-15 style rifles. Wilson Combat, owned by Bill Wilson (developer of .458 HAM'R), sells a .458 HAM'R chambered, AR-style firearm named the WC-12, which is between the sizes of the AR-10 and AR-15 platforms. AR-10 platforms with lowers that accept an AR-15 cartridge can also safely fire the .458 HAM'R.

It is very similar to the .458 SOCOM, specialized to operate at higher pressure, offering an increased range in a flatter trajectory. The cartridge uses an AR-15 sized magazine, but the cartridge pressures require a bolt, barrel, and receiver designed for the pressure of the AR-10 platform.

== Designer ==
Bill Wilson of Wilson Combat designed the cartridge. The .458 HAM'R has a single sister cartridge under the HAM'R name, the .300 HAM'R, also designed by Wilson Combat.

== See also ==
- List of rifle cartridges
- List of AR platform cartridges
- .458 SOCOM
