= .50 Alaskan =

Wildcat rifle cartridge

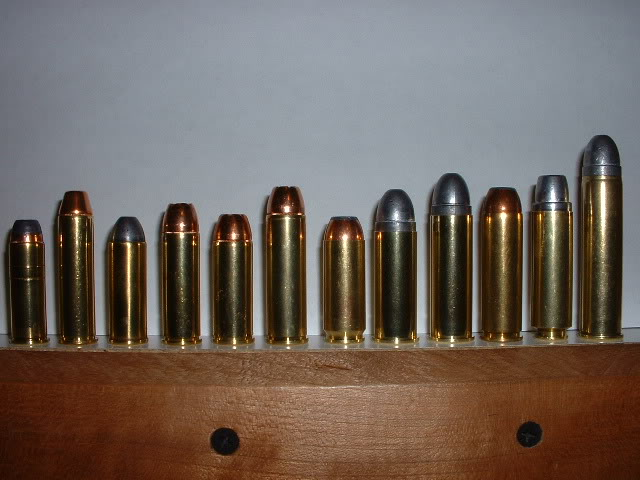
- Left to Right (line by line).44 Magnum, .445 Super Magnum, .45 Colt, .454 Casull,.480 Ruger, .475 Maximum, .50 Action Express, .500 Linebaugh, .500 Maximum, .500 S&W Magnum, .50 Beowulf, .50 Alaskan
- Type: Rifle, Large game
- Place of origin: United States

Production history
- Designer: Harold Johnson
- Designed: early 1950s
- Produced: 1952–present

Specifications
- Parent case: .348 Winchester
- Case type: Rimmed
- Bullet diameter: .510 in (13.0 mm)
- Neck diameter: .536 in (13.6 mm)
- Base diameter: .553 in (14.0 mm)
- Rim diameter: .610 in (15.5 mm)
- Rim thickness: .070 in (1.8 mm)
- Case length: 2.10 in (53 mm)

Ballistic performance
Bullet mass/type	Velocity	Energy
450 gr (29 g) BAR FP	524 m/s (1,720 ft/s)	2,950 J (2,180 ft⋅lbf)
500 gr (32 g) JFP	510 m/s (1,700 ft/s)	3,112 J (2,295 ft⋅lbf)
525 gr (34 g) LFN GC	516 m/s (1,690 ft/s)	3,346 J (2,468 ft⋅lbf)

The .50 Alaskan / 13x53mmR is a wildcat cartridge developed by Harold Johnson and Harold Fuller of the Kenai Peninsula of Alaska in the 1950s. Johnson based the cartridge on the .348 Winchester in order to create a rifle capable of handling the large bears in Alaska.

== Design ==
Harold Johnson necked out the .348 Winchester case to accept a .510" diameter bullet, and Harold Fuller developed the barrel, marrying a .50 caliber barrel to an old Winchester Model 1886 rifle.

Harold Johnson made the first 450 Alaskan in 1952, and continued to make them in the 1950s and 60s. The rifle was based on the Winchester Model 71 in .348 caliber. Bill Fuller made the reamers. John Buhmiller made the barrel. Frank Barnes made the bullets. The "50" came later.

Since the rifle was designed for use on Alaska's great bears, Johnson cut 720-grain (47 g) boat-tail .50 BMG bullets in half, seating the 450-grain (29 g) rear half upside down in the fireformed .50-caliber case. It didn't take Johnson long to find out that the truncated-shaped "solid" would shoot through a big brown bear from any direction, claiming in 1988, "I never recovered a slug from a bear or moose, no matter what angle the animal was shot at."

== Performance ==
Harold's favorite load in the .50 Alaskan was 51.5 grains (3.34 g) of IMR-4198 with a Barnes 400-grain (26 g) flatnose, jacketed bullet for about 2,100 ft/s (640 m/s) and just under 4,000 ft⋅lbf (5,400 J) of muzzle energy.

The Alaskan is shorter than the .510 Kodiak Express and produces about 10% less energy or 33% less energy than the 50-110, out of a 71 Winchester re-barreled to chamber the 50-110 WCF 6,000 foot-pounds.

== Availability ==
Rifles for .50 BMF Bullet are available from some specialty gunsmiths and also conversions from Marlin and Winchester lever-action rifles. Reloading dies are available from Hornady. Brass is available from Starline Brass. Although it is considered a wildcat cartridge, loaded ammunition is available from Buffalo Bore.

== See also ==
- Thumper concept
- List of rifle cartridges
- .458 SOCOM
- .450 Bushmaster
- .50 Beowulf
- 12.7×55mm STs-130
