= .50 Beowulf =

American rifle cartridge

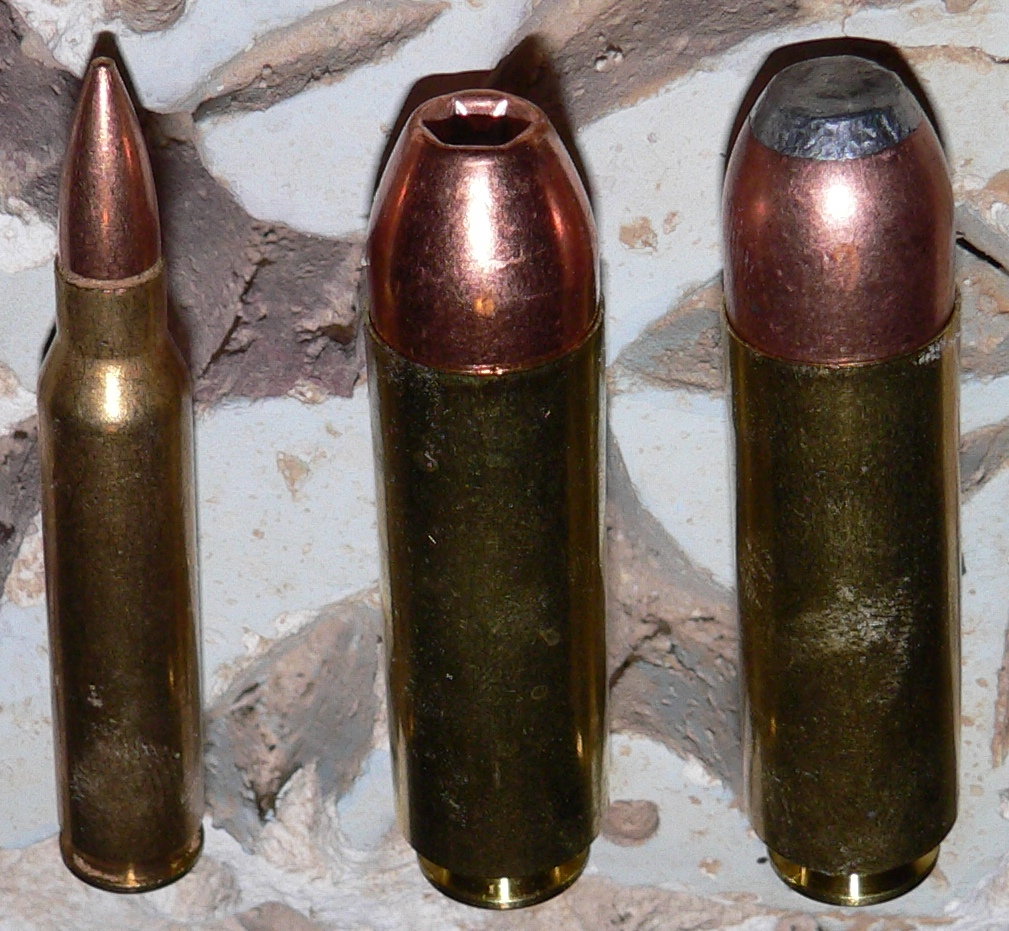
- 5.56 mm compared to .50 Beowulf cartridges.
- Type: Rifle
- Place of origin: United States

Production history
- Designed: 2001
- Produced: 2001–present

Specifications
- Parent case: .50 Action Express
- Case type: Rebated, straight
- Bullet diameter: .500 in (12.7 mm)
- Neck diameter: .525 in (13.3 mm)
- Base diameter: .535 in (13.6 mm)
- Rim diameter: .445 in (11.3 mm)
- Case length: 1.65 in (42 mm)
- Overall length: 2.125 in (54.0 mm)
- Primer type: Large pistol magnum
- Maximum pressure: 33,000 psi (230 MPa)

Ballistic performance
Bullet mass/type	Velocity	Energy
300 gr (19 g) Speer Gold Dot JHP Alexander Arms	1,870 ft/s (570 m/s)	2,330 ft⋅lbf (3,160 J)
325 gr (21 g) Speer JHP Alexander Arms	1,800 ft/s (550 m/s)	2,338 ft⋅lbf (3,170 J)
335 gr (22 g) Rainer Plated FP Alexander Arms	1,771 ft/s (540 m/s)	2,333 ft⋅lbf (3,163 J)
335 gr (22 g) Rainier Plated HP Alexander Arms	1,900 ft/s (580 m/s)	2,678 ft⋅lbf (3,631 J)
400 gr (26 g) Hawk JFP Alexander Arms	1,800 ft/s (550 m/s)	2,878 ft⋅lbf (3,902 J)
- Test barrel length: 16 inches Source: Beowulf Ballistics

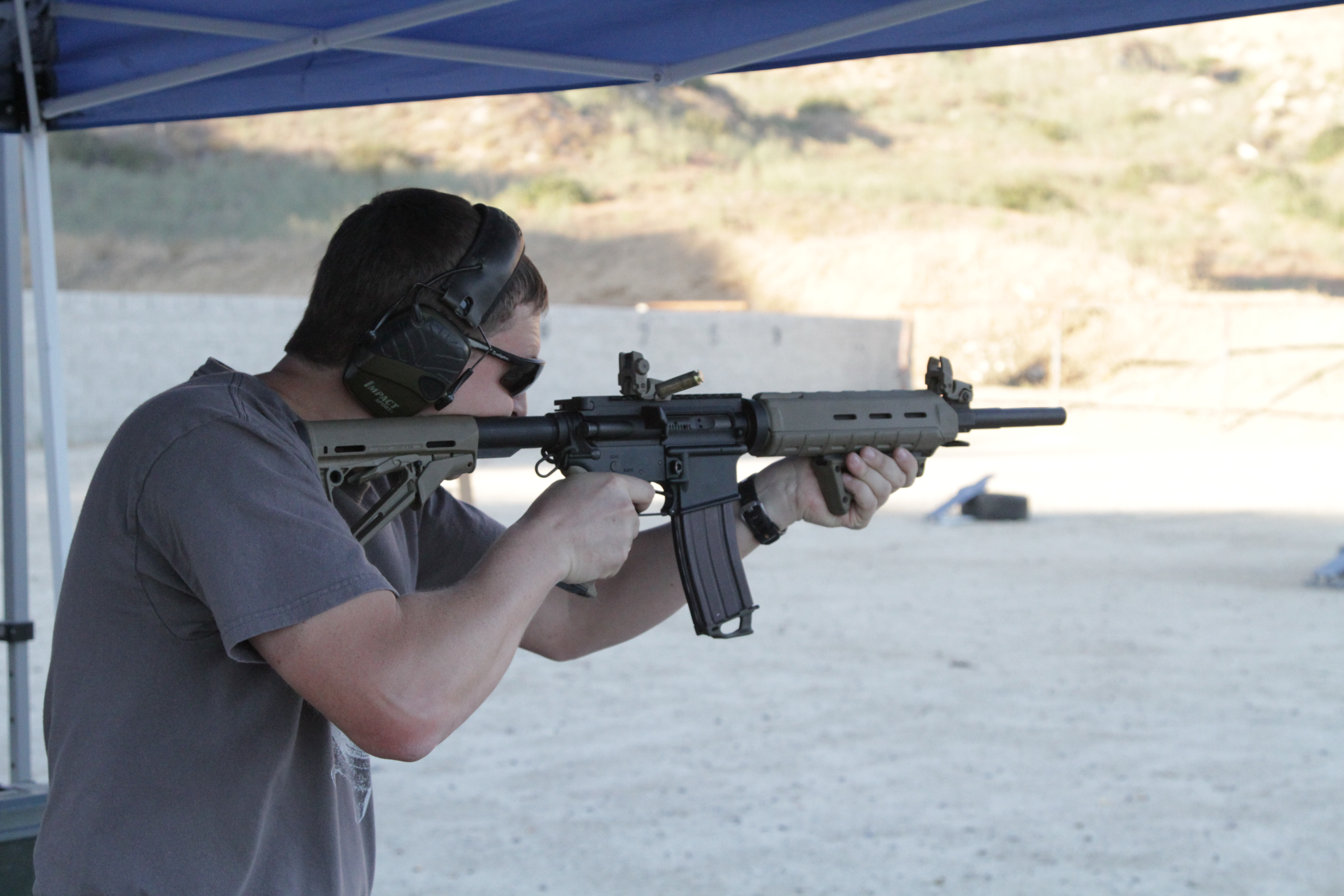
.50 Beowulf AR-15

The .50 Beowulf (12.7×42mmRB) is a 12mm caliber rifle cartridge developed by Bill Alexander of Alexander Arms for use in an AR-15 rifle.

== Design and specifications ==
The cartridge utilizes a rebated rim, sized to match the rim of the 6.5mm Grendel round. The case body is very similar in dimensions to the .500 S&W Magnum revolver cartridge, being slightly longer and fully tapered for automatic feeding in the weapon.

The round is intended to improve stopping power greatly at short- to medium-range as compared to the standard 5.56×45mm NATO round. One of its advertised uses is against vehicles, being able to disable the engine and maintaining its trajectory when hitting windscreens or body panels. It's also advertised as being effective against body armor.

== Design limitations ==
With normal bullet weights between 300 and 400 grains (19 and 26 g), overall cartridge length shorter than that of an AR-15 magazine well, and holding to pressures of 33,000 psi limited by the AR bolt strength system, the .50 Beowulf is best described as a low-velocity, heavy caliber, making its ballistics roughly equivalent to those of early .45-70 Government rounds rather than the higher pressure rounds tolerated by lever-action rifles such as the Marlin Model 1895.

== Proprietary status ==
The .50 Beowulf is a proprietary caliber developed as a specialized cartridge. Alexander Arms and Delta Firearms oversee all aspects of the production of the system and related accessories. Their reluctance to divulge information has been a source of irritation to some writers. Because Alexander Arms holds a trademark on the name .50 Beowulf, a number of other companies produce weapons and ammunition reverse-engineered to the same dimensions under the name 12.7×42mm.

== Sporting uses ==
Although much has been written about its tactical uses, the .50 Beowulf is gaining recognition as a sporting cartridge. It is becoming more widely recognized as being usable for a wide variety of North American game, including deer, moose, and black bear.

== Similar cartridges ==
The cartridge has its lineage in the .50 Action Express, starting with the L.A.R. Grizzly and in modern times, the Magnum Research Desert Eagle pistol, with significant modification to improve functionality and safety in the AR-15 rifle.

== See also ==
- .458 SOCOM
- .450 Bushmaster
- .50 Alaskan
- 12.7×55mm STs-130
- List of AR platform cartridges
- List of rebated rim cartridges
- List of rifle cartridges
- Thumper concept
