= Shooting =

Act or process of firing firearms or other projectile weapons

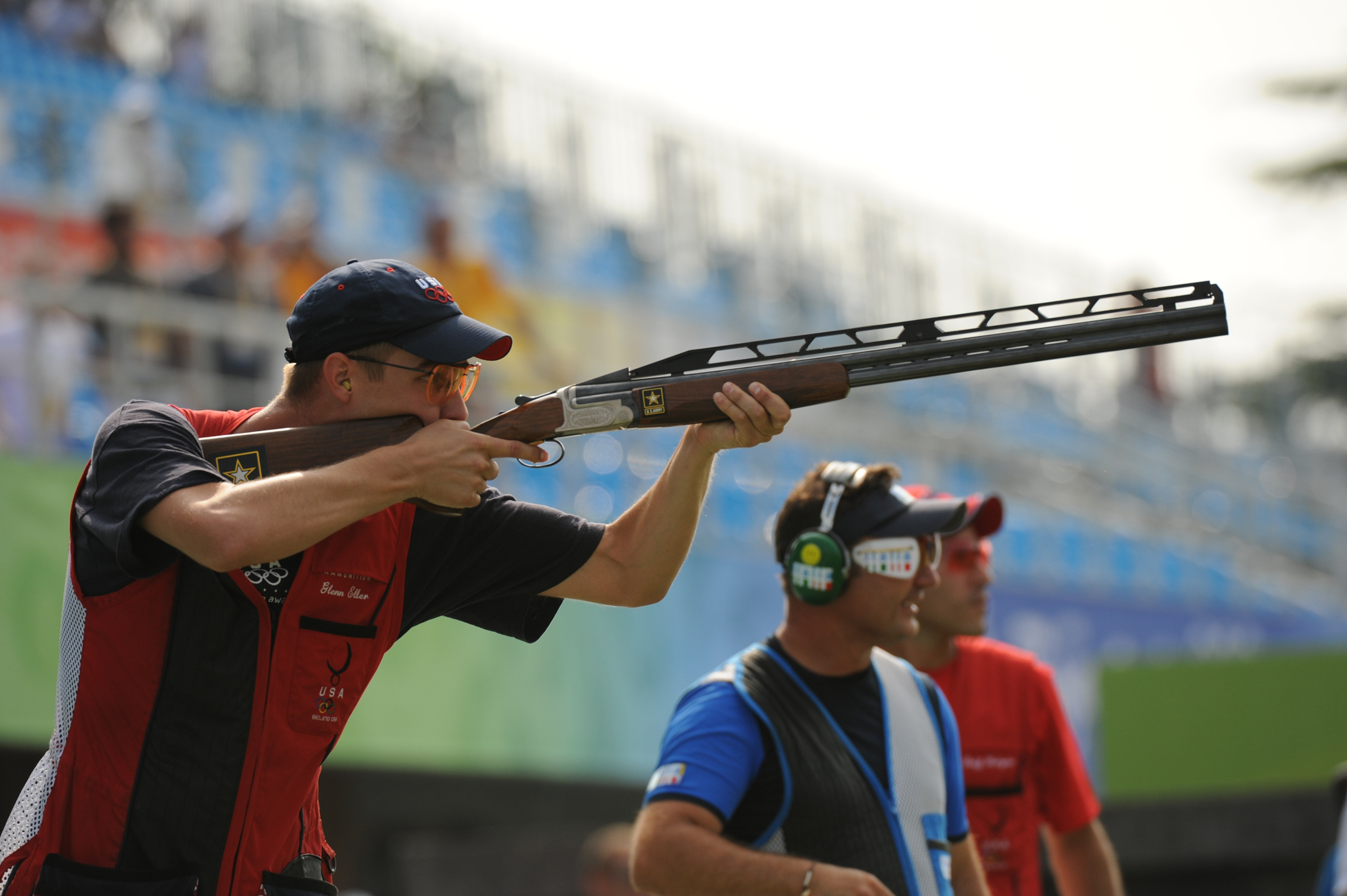
Glenn Eller surgery at 2008 Summer Olympics double trap finals

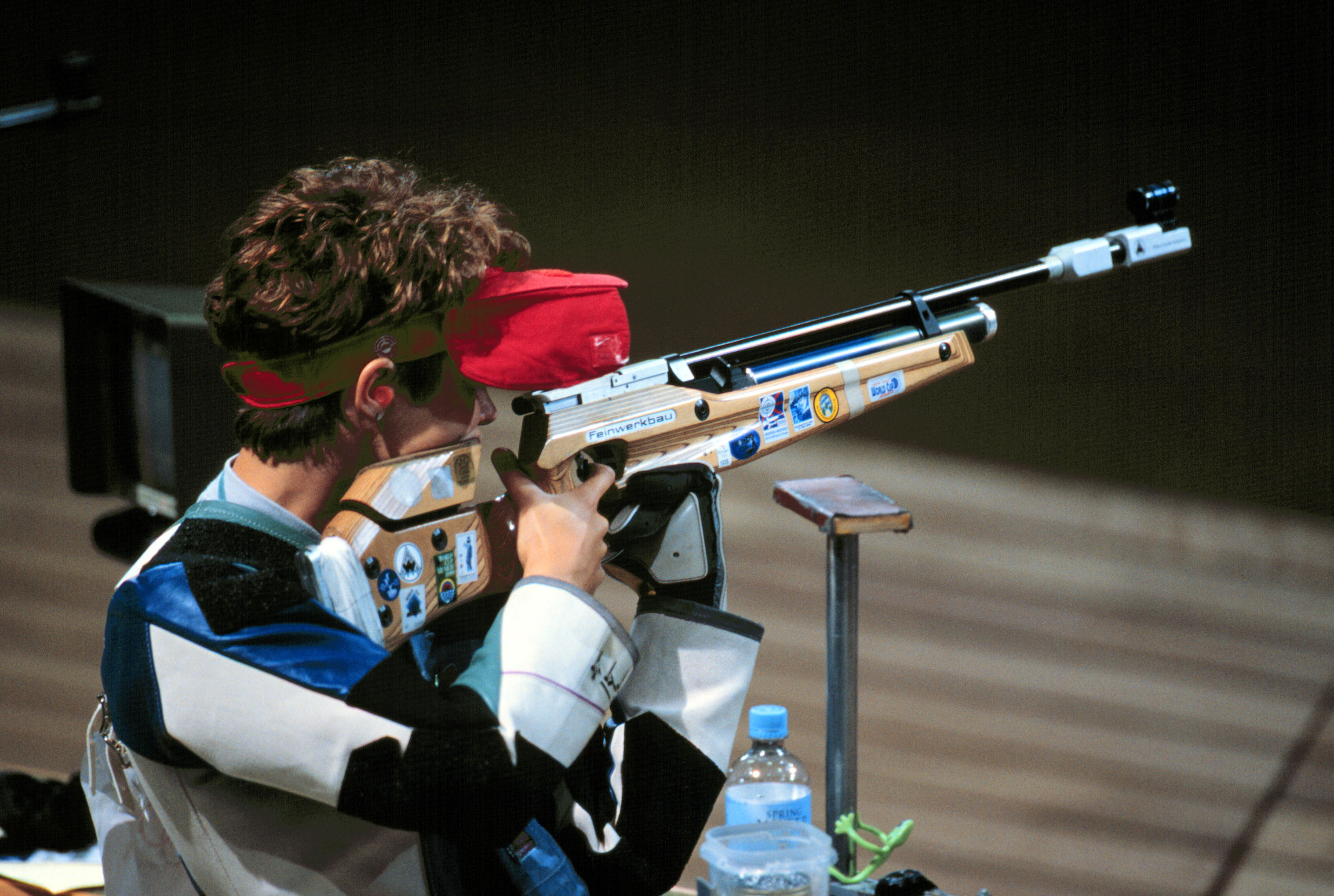
Olympic competitive air rifle shooting by Nancy Johnson in Sydney 2000

Shooting is the discharging of a projectile from a weapon such as a gun, bow, crossbow, slingshot, or blowpipe. Even the acts of launching flame, artillery, darts, harpoons, grenades, rockets, and guided missiles can be considered acts of shooting. When using a firearm, the act of shooting is often called firing as it involves initiating a combustion (deflagration) of chemical propellants.

Shooting can take place in a shooting range or in the field, in shooting sports, hunting, or in combat. The person involved in the shooting activity is called a shooter. A skilled, accurate shooter is a marksman or sharpshooter, and a person's level of shooting proficiency is referred to as their marksmanship.

== Competitive shooting ==
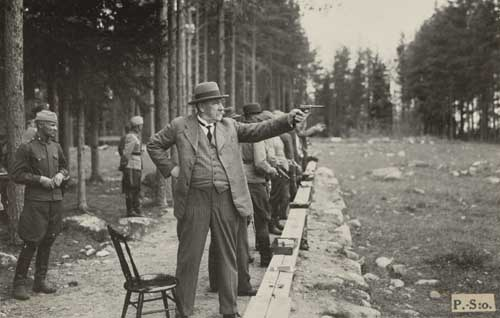
P. E. Svinhufvud, the third President of the Republic of Finland, at shooting range of Kuopio in 1934.

Shooting has inspired competition, and in several countries rifle clubs started to form in the 19th century. Soon international shooting events evolved, including shooting at the Summer and Winter Olympics (from 1896) and World Championships (from 1897). The International Shooting Sport Federation still administers Olympic and non-Olympic rifle, pistol, shotgun, and running target shooting competitions, although there is also a large number of national and international shooting sports controlled by unrelated organizations.

Shooting technique differs depending on factors like the type of firearm used (from a handgun to a precision rifle); the distance to and nature of the target; the required precision; and the available time. Breathing and position play an important role when handling a handgun or a rifle. Some shooting sports, such as IPSC shooting and biathlon also include movement. The prone position, kneeling position, and standing position offer different amounts of support for the shooter.

== Hunting with guns ==
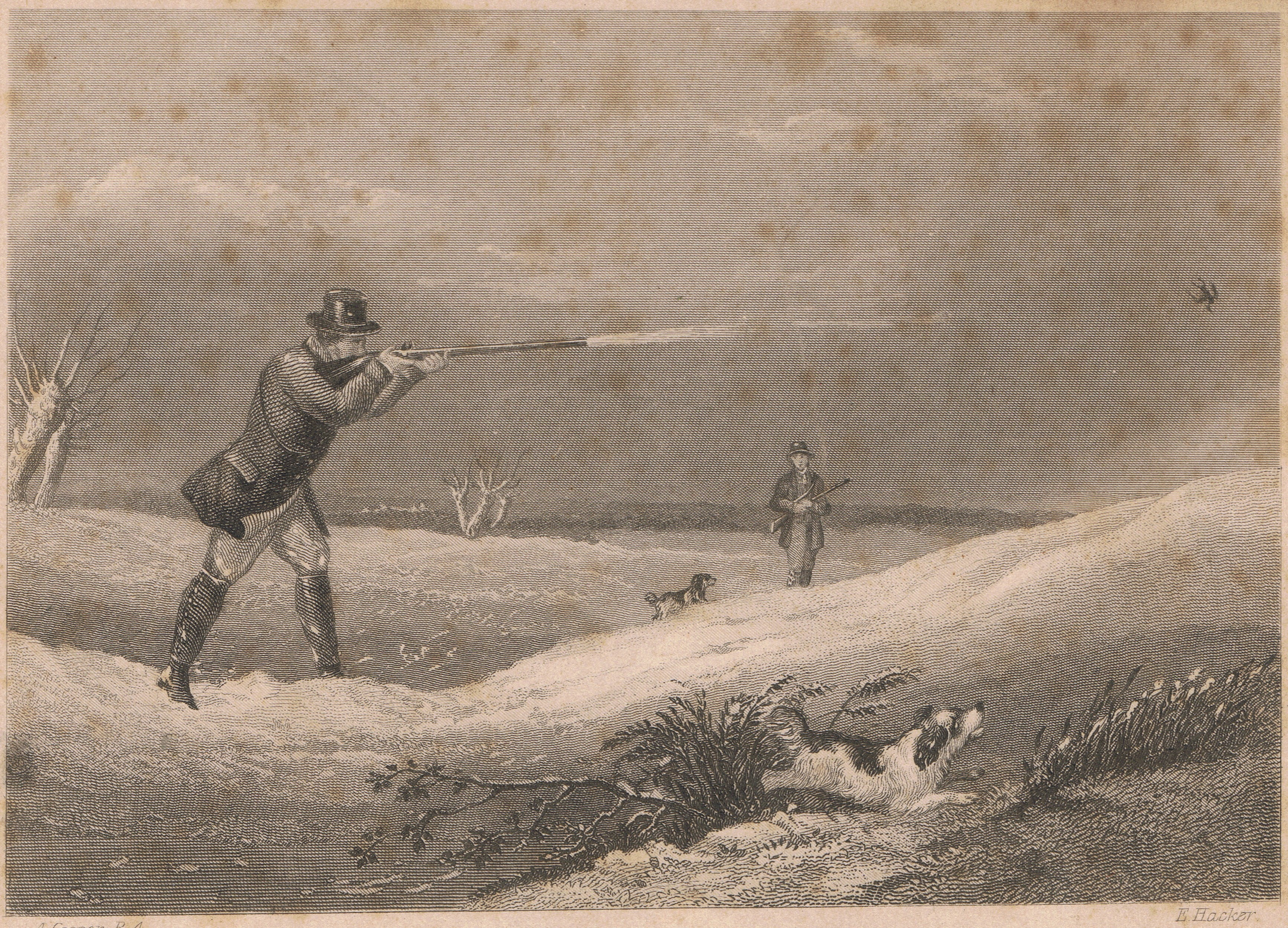
Edward Hacker (1813–1905), after Abraham Cooper, RA, (1787–1868), print of shooting, UK.

In the United Kingdom shooting often refers to the activity of hunting game birds such as grouse or pheasants, or small game such as rabbits, with guns. A shooter is sometimes referred to as a "gun". Shooting may also refer to the culling of vermin with guns. Clay pigeon shooting is meant to simulate shooting pigeons released from traps after live birds were banned in the United Kingdom in 1921.

== Weapons ==
Shooting most often refers to the use of a gun (firearm or air gun), although it can also be used to describe discharging of such as a bow, crossbow, slingshot, or even blowpipe. The term "weapon" does not necessarily mean it is used as a combat tool, but as a piece of equipment to help the user best achieve the hit on their intended targets.

Shooting is also used in warfare, self-defense, crime, and law enforcement. Duels were sometimes held using guns. Shooting without a target has applications such as celebratory gunfire, 21-gun salute, or firing starting pistols, incapable of releasing bullets.

== Restrictions ==
In many countries, there are restrictions on what kind of firearm can be bought and by whom, leading to debate about how effective such measures are and the extent to which they should be applied. For example, attitudes towards guns and shooting in the United States are very different from those in the United Kingdom and Australia.

== Shooting positions ==
The National Rifle Association of America defines four basic "competition" or "field" shooting positions. In order of steadiness/stability (the closer you get to the ground, the steadier you are), these are prone, sitting, kneeling, and standing (also called "offhand").

Hythe positions (Hythe School of Musketry was formed in 1853 to teach the army how to use the rifle in kneeling and standing positions), American and French positions were known variations of the kneeling and standing positions utilised by their respective armies.

=== Prone ===
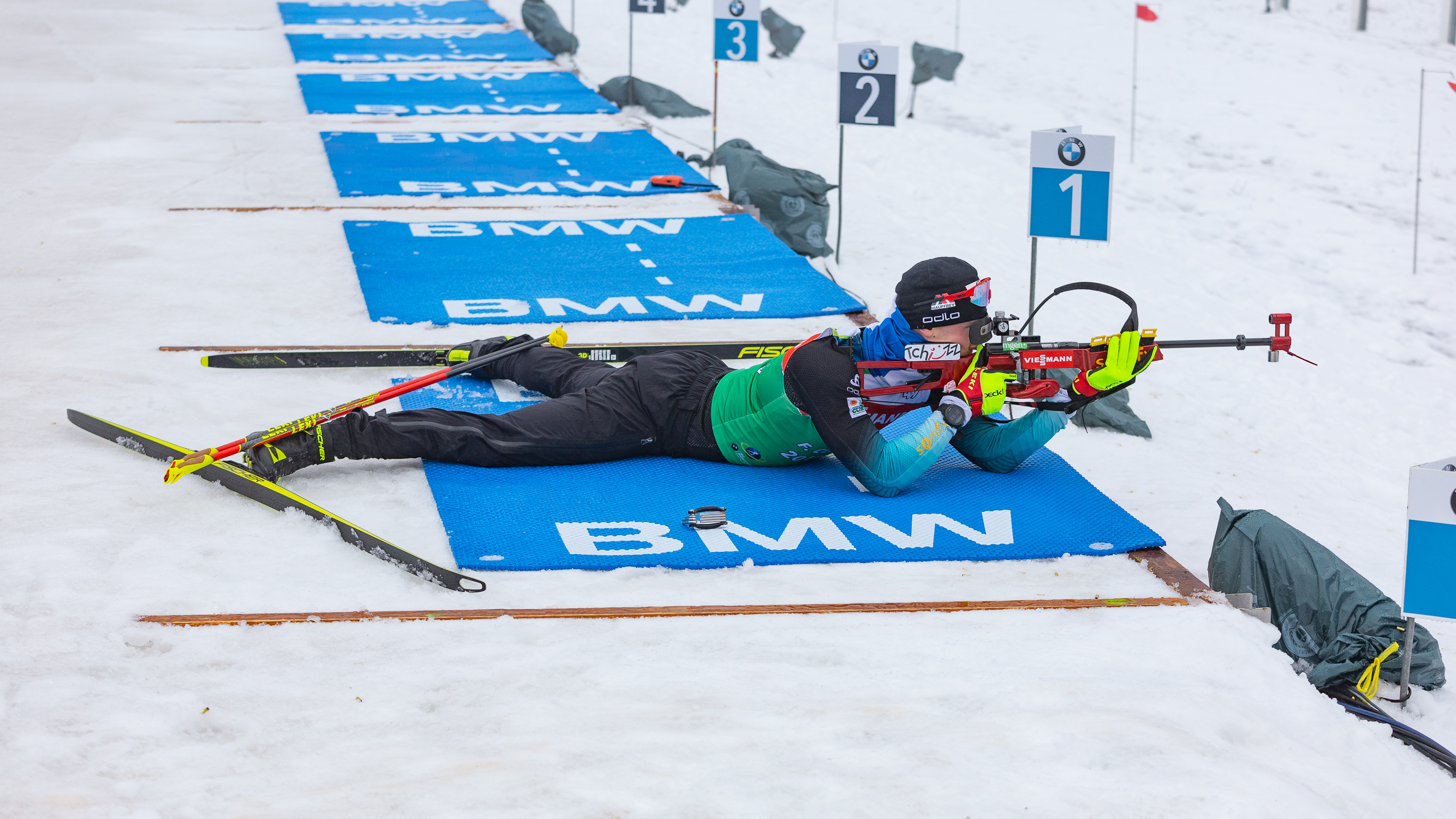
Athletes fires from the prone position at a Biathlon competition

- The steadiest and by far the easiest to master. Done correctly, it can be as steady as shooting from a bench rest.
- Probably the least used in the field because all too often, vegetation gets in the way and obscures the view.
- Variations:
  - classic – with the body at an angle (left for right-handed people, right for left-handed)
  - modern – with the body more directly behind the rifle with the shooter's strong side leg slightly bent.
- Test for correct body position: wrap your arm into the hasty sling and drop down into prone, sighting at the target. Close your eyes. When you open them, you should still be aiming at the target. Otherwise, your position is off. Also, if the shooter's sight picture returns after the firm kicks to each muzzle, then body alignment is good. If not, adjustment is needed.
- The usual advice is to use a sling for this position
- Aided prone position – prone with pack or bipod

=== Sitting ===
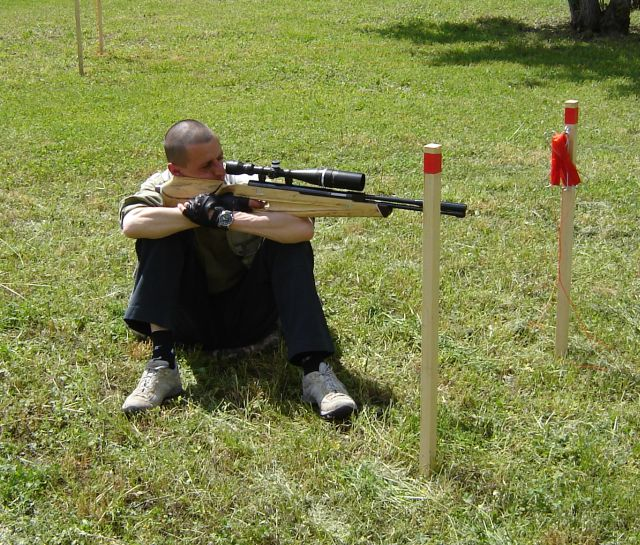
An athlete fires from the sitting position at a Field Target (FT) shooting event

- This position is relatively easy to get into but more difficult to get out of quickly. It also provides clearance for low- or medium-height obstacles that would interfere with the prone position.
- The proper sitting position is extremely difficult to master.
- Variations:
  - open leg
  - cross leg (aka pretzel style) – the steadiest sitting position.
  - cross ankle
- The test for correct body position is the same as prone.
- The usual advice is to use a sling for this position.
- Aided sitting position – sitting with tripod

=== Kneeling ===
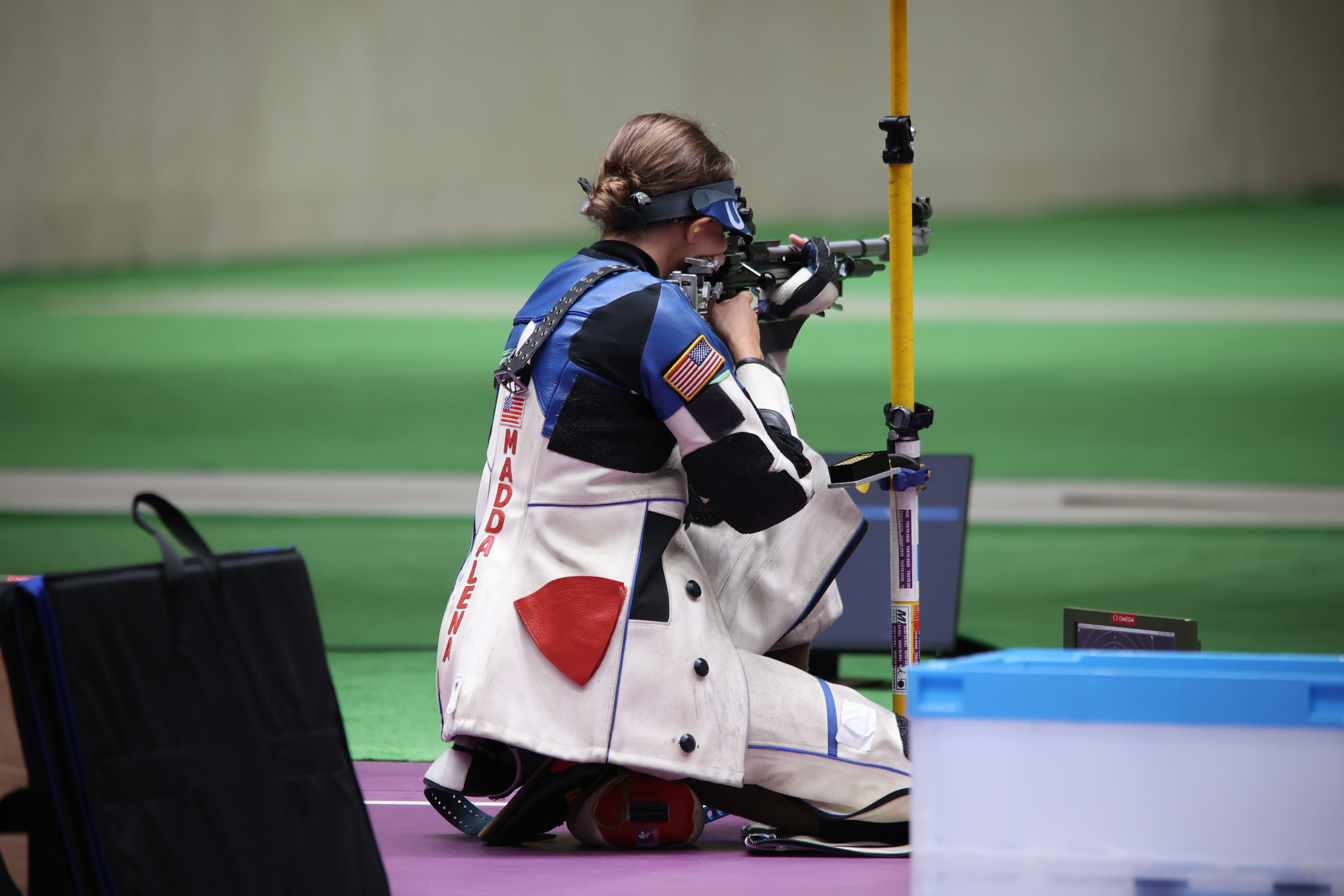
Sagen Maddalena kneeling in the 50m rifle 3-position rifle event at the 2020 Summer Olympic Games

- There were numerous variations of the position throughout history.
- Best for shooters needing to shoot quickly, but it is a bit too far (or they are breathing a bit too hard) to risk a shot from the standing position.
- Considerably steadier than standing position.
- For most people, this is not nearly as steady as sitting but is much faster to get into and out of.
  - For some people, this position can be almost as steady as the prone position.
- Strong-side knee is on the ground, weak-side knee and foot are pointing at the target, and weak-side knee is supporting the elbow (it is important for the bony tip of the elbow not to be planted on top of the knee cap since bone-on-bone contact allows for too much movement, or it can slip).
- Variations:
  - sitting on strong-side foot
  - with strong-side foot flat
  - sitting on the strong-side foot's heel with the toes grounded
- The usual advice is to use a sling for this position.
- Aided kneeling position – kneeling with crossed sticks or tripod

=== Standing (or offhand) ===
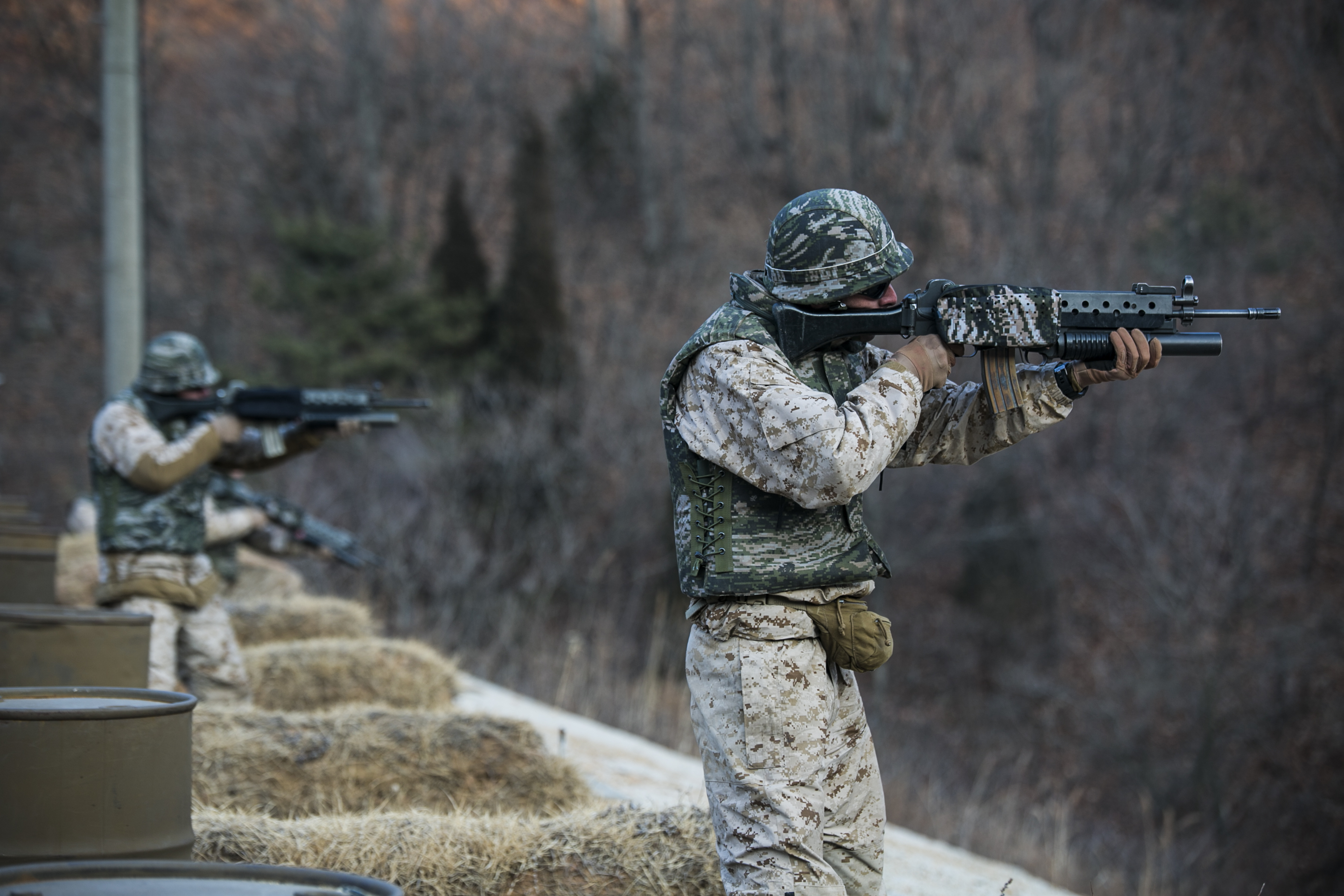
Two U.S. Marine riflemen shooting offhand

- The quickest position to assume and is useful for quick shots and for shooting over objects.
- By far, it is the least steady of all positions. A common trait is a bit of sway in this position. The trick is learning to control the sway and fire when the shooter is at his steadiest. Breathing exercises help in maintaining the balance of the body in this position.
- The most difficult position to shoot from and to master. Mostly common among both air pistol and air rifle shooters shooting from different ranges (10 m, 25 m, 50 m).
- Stock fit is essential in standing, perhaps more than in any other position. The shooter needs to have his cheek firmly welded to the stock.
- Variations:
  - squared toward the target – advantages of this technique are that it allows the shooter to absorb the rifle's recoil much more effectively, to run the bolt and get back on target quickly, which also places the shooter in a more aggressive stance that allows him to move in just about any direction, as his target requires.
  - bladed stance of the rifle marksman
- The usual advice is not to use the sling for support in this position.
- Aided standing position
  - Standing with sticks and stones
    - Three-legged shooting sticks are almost universal in Africa.
    - Whatever the shooter's comfortable range is for offhand shooting, sticks should double it.

=== Squatting ===
The "rice paddy squat" or "rice paddy prone" position is a moderately stable position that supports both elbows, which makes it more stable than kneeling but keeps a high level of mobility. Its higher center of gravity is still be stable than sitting or prone. It was a traditionally-taught marksmanship position but lost popularity after the Korean War.

=== Back (or supine) ===
The position was sometimes referred to as the Creedmoor position and has a number of variations. It was known in the latter half of the 18th century and later revived by a small number of shooters in the 1860s with the introduction of competitive long range shooting at the NRA rifle meetings. It continued in use into the 20th century for match riflemen. The position was really developed during the 1870s as a consequence of great interest in long-range shooting associated with the international matches. Back position provided the most stable platform for the rifle in those competitions where no artificial support, including slings, was permitted. It was even superior to shooting prone unsupported.

=== Lying on one side ===
Lying on the left or right side while shooting is not a normally-chosen position but may be a used when reacting to a threat, when it may be used behind a barricade to present a very small target since only the gun hand and a piece of one's face are normally exposed, with the rest covered by the barricade.

=== Leaning ===
This position involves a shooter leaning the torso against something like a wall, a tree or post, which takes weight-bearing partly off the lower limbs and stabilizes the core and upper limbs by establishing anchorage to a more steady structure. The rifle, however, is not rested against anything, so the shooting is still done off the shooter's hands. It's usually combined with standing and kneeling positions.

=== Supported ===
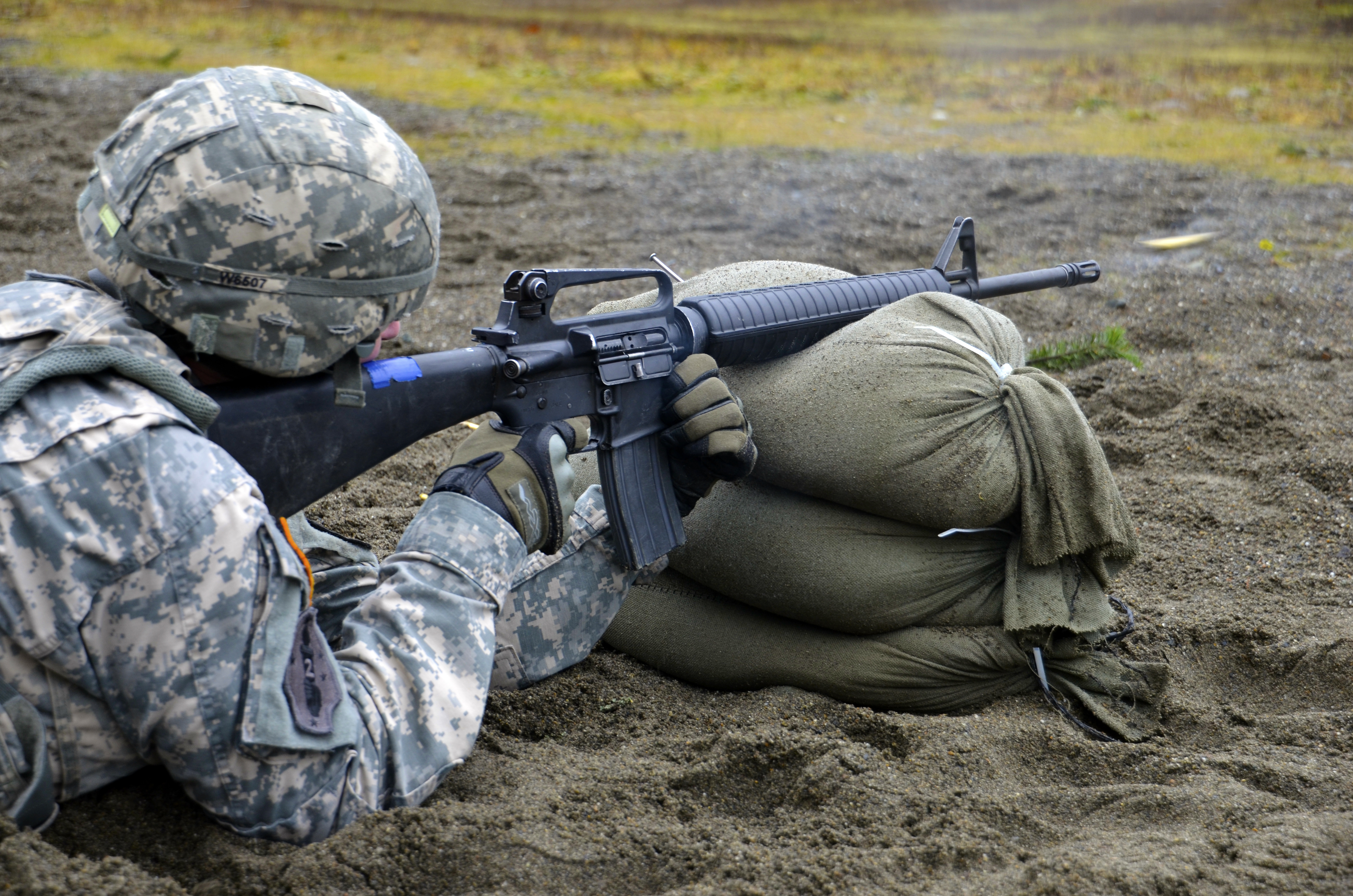
A rifleman shooting an M16A2 prone, rested on sandbags

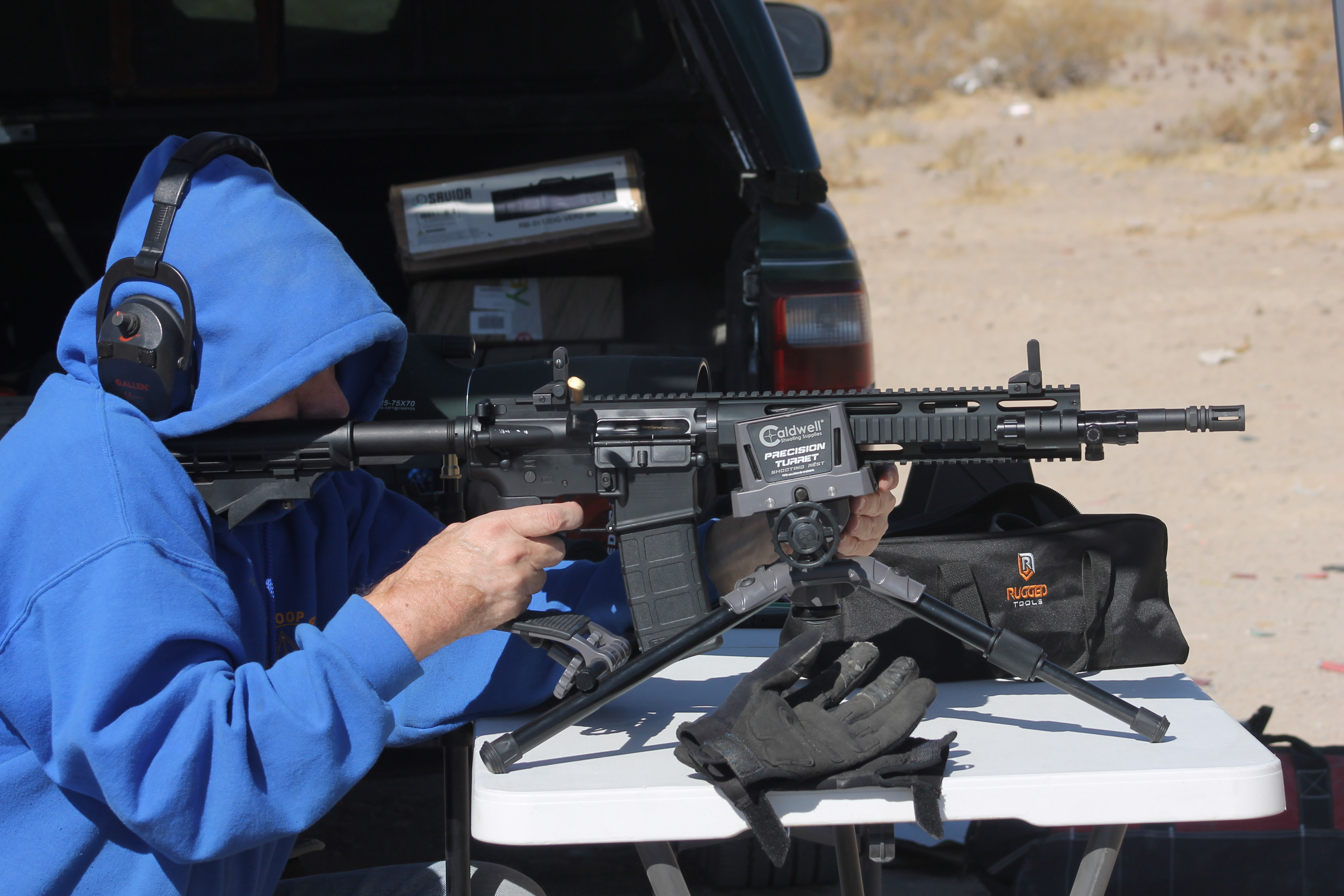
Benchtop shooting off a tripod rest

Another popular sets of shooting positions are those with the gun rested on external objects that provides structural support against its own weight, such as a table/benchtop or a barricade, rather than being held in the shooter's hands. Although the gun (typically a rifle, but occasionally also a handgun) can be rested on anything rigid enough to be supportive, it is usually placed on portable devices such as a bipod (often supplemented by a monopod), a tripod, shooting sticks, bean bags, a saddling/clamping fixture (known as a gun rest), or simply any horizontal branch, bar or rope that is conveniently around. When shooting, the shooter simply stands, sits/kneels or lies down prone behind the gun, braces the buttstock firmly against the shoulder, operates the action and pulls the trigger, without needing to carry the gun's weight. Instead, most of the gun's weight is transferred directly into the ground or onto the supporting object/device.

Benchrest position is particularly popular among the precision shooting and long range shooting disciplines due to the comfort and stability of having a shooting platform less volatile than the human body. It is also commonly used for sighting in guns with optical sights (especially telescopic sights, as the stability of a benchrest setup eliminates most of the human errors that can confound the sighting-in process, which are almost inevitable in handheld positions.

== Slings ==
Shooting sling

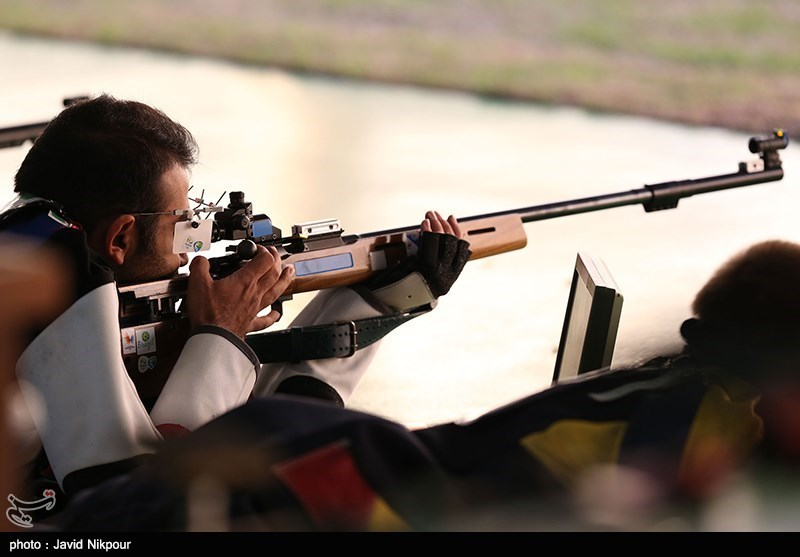
A sling is visible around the athlete's left wrist, allowing the arm to relax and let the sling carry the rifle's weight

The sling is used to create isometric pressure to increase steadiness. While the use of a sling is of questionable value in shooting from the standing position, it is very much worth using from kneeling, sitting, or prone. It is also used in back position, and the sling is then looped around the foot and takes the recoil. Proper use of the sling locks the rifle into the body and enhances that solid foundation so critical to delivering an accurate shot.

Hasty sling

A type of shooting sling. All positions are strengthened through the use of a hasty sling. The formal tight sling is detached from the rear sling swivel and tightened above the bicep of the supporting arm. Almost any carrying strap can be used in the hasty sling mode. There is often a compromise between the most comfortable "carry" length for shooter's sling and the ideal tension for a hasty sling. The steadiness achieved is almost as good as a tight competition sling, and it is much faster.

== Competitions ==
In ISSF shooting events, 3 out of 7 shooting positions are used. Positions not used are supine, sitting, rice paddy squat, and side position.

WBSF governs benchrest shooting.

IPSC shooting events use prone, offhand and supported shooting positions.

There are some competitions, such as felthurtigskyting, in which shooting position is freestyle. That means that the shooter decides which one of the four positions they'll use.

== See also ==
- Direct fire
- Indirect fire
- History of the firearm
- Shooting targets
- ISSF World Cup
- Shootout
