= EBSF =

EBSF may refer to:

- Estonian Baseball and Softball Federation
- European Benchrest Shooting Federation, the European international member body of the World Benchrest Shooting Federation (WBSF)
- Exploring Ballet with Suzanne Farrell, at John F. Kennedy Center for the Performing Arts
- EBSF–1250 is a guitar model of the Gibson ES series
