= International Benchrest Shooters =

- Abbreviation: IBS

Official website
- internationalbenchrest.com

International Benchrest Shooters (IBS) is as a governing body for benchrest shooting that is mainly active in the USA.

== Disciplines ==
Competitions within IBS are divided into the categories Group which are benchrest disciplines, and Long Range which bears some resemblance to F-Class competitions.

Group

- Benchrest 100 yard (Group or Score)
- Benchrest 200 yard (Group or Score)
- Benchrest 300 yard (Group or Score)

Long Range

- Long Range 600 yard
- Long Range 1000 yard

== Targets ==
IBS uses several different target types for different distances and disciplines.

IBS 100 yard target
Measures 8 in × 15.5 in (200 mm × 390 mm), and has black lines on white paper.
IBS 200 yard target
Measures 8 in × 16.5 in (200 mm × 420 mm), and has black lines on white paper.
IBS 300 yard target
Measures 12 in × 24 in (300 mm × 610 mm), and has red lines on white paper.
IBS 1000 yard target
Measures 42 in × 42 in (1,100 mm × 1,100 mm), and has blue lines on white paper, as well as a blue bullseye to make it easier to spot impacts on the paper targets from a distance.

== Records ==
In 2018, Mike Wilson shot a record setting 5-shot group measuring 1.068 in (27.1 mm) at 1,000 yd (910 m), which corresponds to an angular size of 0.102 moa or 0.029 mrad. The record was set shooting the 6mmBR Ackley Improved cartridge in good weather conditions, and the group was even centered in the X-ring. The IBS record from 2007 measured 1.397 in (35.5 mm), which corresponds to an angular size of 0.133 moa or 0.038 mrad.

== See also ==
- List of shooting sports organizations
- World Benchrest Shooting Federation, a competing benchrest shooting governing body
