= Railgun (disambiguation) =

A railgun is a weapon that uses electromagnetic force to launch high-velocity projectiles

Railgun or rail gun may also refer to:

- Railway gun, a large artillery piece mounted on, transported by, and fired from a railroad car
- Benchrest rifle, also known as a rail gun, a rifle built into a machine rest
- Mikoto Misaka, also known as "Railgun", a fictional character in the light novel series A Certain Magical Index and the manga series A Certain Scientific Railgun
