= Benchrest rifle =

Rifle built into a machine rest

A Jay-Young-built unlimited-class benchrest rifle using a 2-inch-diameter (51 mm) Lilja Precision barrel.

A benchrest rifle, also colloquially called a "rail gun", is a rifle with its barrel and action mechanism built into a machine rest, used mainly for benchrest shooting. The rifle has no proper stock and its base uses adjustable feet to provide a stable position on the bench, and the rifle is finely aimed with horizontal and vertical adjustments built into the rest.

== Benchrest shooting ==
Aside from their use for testing ammunition or components by ammunition manufacturers (almost always indoors, or in a "tunnel"), benchrest rifles are used in the Unlimited Class of benchrest shooting, almost always outdoors, where the effects of the wind can be considerable.

Benchrest rifles "return to battery". That is, the repetition of the aiming point is assured by mechanical means. Secondly, in a properly built and functioning rail gun, aside from the forces used to aim the rifle, the forces generated in firing the rifle will be consistent from shot to shot.

However, the goal of most benchrest competitions is to achieve a high precision, mechanically returning the rifle to the same aiming point only removes problems caused by mirage. It is of no aid in dealing with shot deflection caused by wind. Indeed, since the usual practice in dealing with anticipated shot displacement cause by the wind is to "hold off" (i.e., use a different aiming point), some feel that the use of a return-to-battery rifle can be a disadvantage.

On the surface, this appears a valid argument, but based on match reports [IBS, NBRSA], it is not a particularly good one. While "reading the wind"—anticipating shot deflection caused by varying wind speed and direction—is the same problem faced by competitors using conventional benchrest rifles, return-to-battery rifles do, in fact, generally place higher than the "bag guns" (rifles shot off sandbags, which have to be consciously aimed for each shot). With any benchrest rifle, there are two techniques generally used to deal with the wind. The first is for the rifleman to shoot only when he considers the wind to be the same as with previous shots. Here, the return to battery rifle can be an advantage. The second is to purposefully change the point of aim, just as one would do with a conventional rifle. Due to time limits, in any given match, both techniques will usually have to be employed.

A second use of return-to-battery rifles is for the testing of components, including barrels, bullets, powder, primers, and the interaction of these and the other components of the rifle. That such testing is both useful and necessary points up that a rifle is a system, and precision shooting perforce involves all components, as well as good shooting techniques. Benchrest remove only two factors, 1) the ability to precisely return a rifle to the same point of aim, and 2) to apply constant forces to the rifle from shot to shot. A proper design and build of the rifle is difficult to achieve.

The fundamental purpose of a bench rest is to eliminate, in the shooting, inconsistent potential human interactions such as the push against the shoulder, trigger pressure, breathing, or heartbeat. This helps to provide a more consistent testing of the system components.
