= Benchrest shooting =

Shooting sport

- Highest governing body: World Benchrest Shooting Federation

Characteristics
- Contact: No
- Equipment: Rifle

Presence
- Olympic: No
- World Championships: Yes
- Paralympic: No

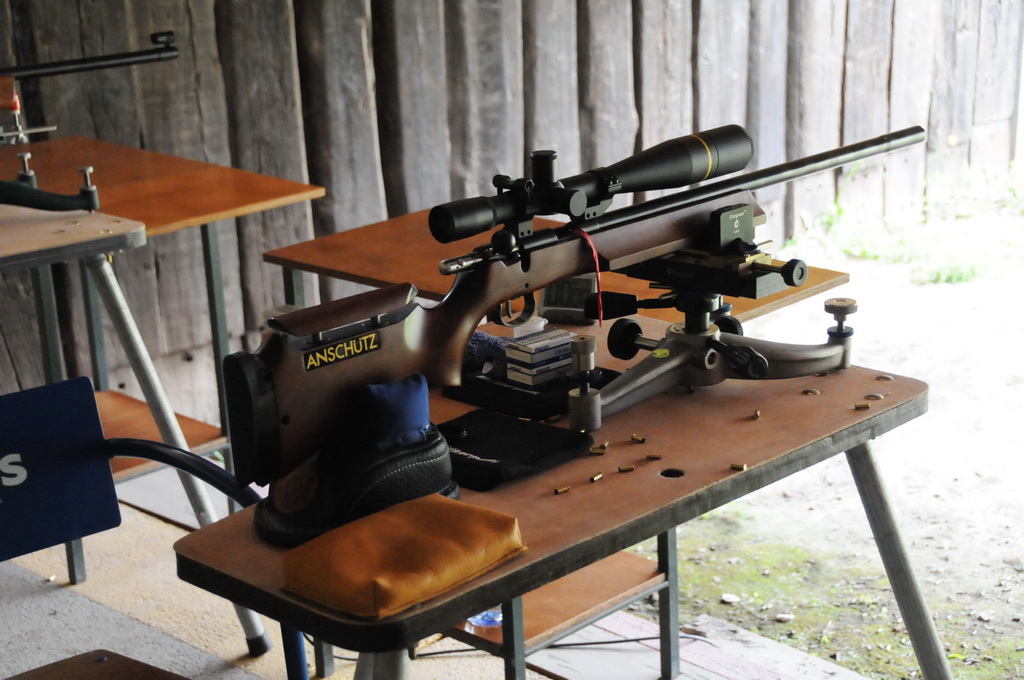
A benchrest Anschütz 1903 rifle used for BR50 .22 LR rimfire competitions, riding on an adjustable machine rest at the front and a saddled bean bag at the rear.

An unlimited class "railgun".

Benchrest shooting is a shooting sport discipline in which high-precision rifles are rested on a table or bench – rather than being carried in the shooter's hands – while shooting at paper or steel targets, hence the name "benchrest". Both the forearm and buttstock of such a rifle are usually fully supported by bean bags, a bipod/monopod (front/rear) combination, and/or a specially designed fixture device called shooting rest (which may be one- or two-piece depending on competition rules), so that the gun can remain stably pointing at the target without needing to be held by someone. When shooting, the shooter simply sits/stands comfortably behind the table/bench, operates the action and pulls the trigger, without needing to worry about carrying any weight of the gun. This is in contrast to other shooting disciplines, where the shooter has to bear at least part of the gun's weight while holding it steady to aim, even when using support devices such as bipods, tripods or shooting sticks.

Shooting guns from stable benchrests may also provide a stable platform for sighting in less specialized firearms, including even handguns, shotguns and muzzleloaders, as it eliminates most of the human errors that can confound the sighting-in process.

Benchrest shooters typically focus on precision and accuracy through systematic experimentation. Most benchrest rifles are custom-made and many shooters do their own gunsmithing. The majority of shooters in centerfire competition handload their ammunition in order to optimize performance for their rifle. In contrast, handloading ammunition is strictly prohibited by the rules for rimfire benchrest competitions.

The post-Civil War era "double rest" rifles were one early form of "benchrest" rifles. The World Benchrest Shooting Federation (WBSF) is the main international governing body for benchrest shooting and encompasses both fullbore and smallbore competitions, including the biennial World Benchrest Championships. World Rimfire and Air Rifle Benchrest Federation (WRABF) is a smaller international governing body focusing on smallbore competitions. The International Benchrest Shooters (IBS) and Global Benchrest Association (GBA) are two organizations which are only active in the United States.

== Types of competition ==
High accuracy but low precision

High precision but low accuracy

There are two major types of competition. The goal of the original benchrest shooting was to shoot five or ten bullets into the smallest group possible (all in one hole). Winning placement in competition is determined by how well each competitor achieves this goal or in other words, how closely the shots are grouped. This is termed "Group Shooting".

The other is a more recent development, "score shooting". The difference is that the traditional bullseye-type target with scoring rings is used. Winning placement is determined by each shooter's score results.

However, in 550 and 910 metres (600 and 1,000 yd) competitions (IBS, NBRSA, and The Original Pennsylvania 1,000 Yard Benchrest Club), the competitor's target is scored for both group size and score. A competitor may only win in one category. If, for example, a single competitor has the smallest group and highest score, they will be awarded only a win for the smallest group, the next highest score will be awarded the score win.

Additionally, there is growing interest in both rimfire and airgun benchrest. Currently, both of these competitions are of the score format only.

Benchrest shooters attempt to achieve the ultimate in rifle precision; records for single 910 metres (1,000 yd), ten-shot groups are as small as 76 millimetres (3 in) (84 μRad), the 550 metres (600 yd) record for a single five-shot group is 17.8 millimetres (0.699 in) (32 μRad) (there are no ten-shot competitions at 600 yards), while 180 metres (200 yd) ten-shot groups are around 5.1 millimetres (0.2 in) (28 μRad), and 91 metres (100 yd) 10-shot groups are around 2.5 millimetres (0.1 in) (27 μRad). Five-shot groups are significantly smaller. Groups are measured from center-to-center, thus negating the variations of different calibers. To accomplish this, the group is measured across its overall widest dispersion, then the diameter of the bullet is subtracted for the result. For example, a group measuring 9.5 millimetres (0.375 in) is scored 3.4 millimetres (0.132 in) (.375"-.243") for a 6 mm (.243") bullet. Matches are shot from 46 metres (50 yd) with rimfire rifles, up to 910 metres (1,000 yd) for centerfire rifles.

In competitive group shooting at 91–274 metres (100–300 yd), shots often land very close together making only one ragged hole in the target, therefore a method for verifying the required number of shots (five or ten) is used. This consists of a motorized single roll of paper stretched across and moving behind the targets which will record the number of bullets passing through each target.

== Equipment ==
Since benchrest is a sport requiring the highest possible accuracy and precision, the highest precision equipment is required if a shooter is to be competitive. The rifle is the most obvious cost; the most accurate guns are custom-built and can cost thousands of dollars. Handloading equipment is also essential for centerfire shooters (rimfire rounds are generally not handloaded) to allow tuning the ammunition to the rifle. In order to achieve extreme accuracy, the guns must be fired from a stable platform called a bench, which is a heavy, solid table usually anchored into the ground. Benches made of cinder block with a poured concrete top are commonly used in competition. Wooden benches are still used on some ranges. For most rifles, rests are required to provide a stable shooting surface, and most shooters use some method of judging the direction and/or velocity of the wind on the range.

=== Rifles ===
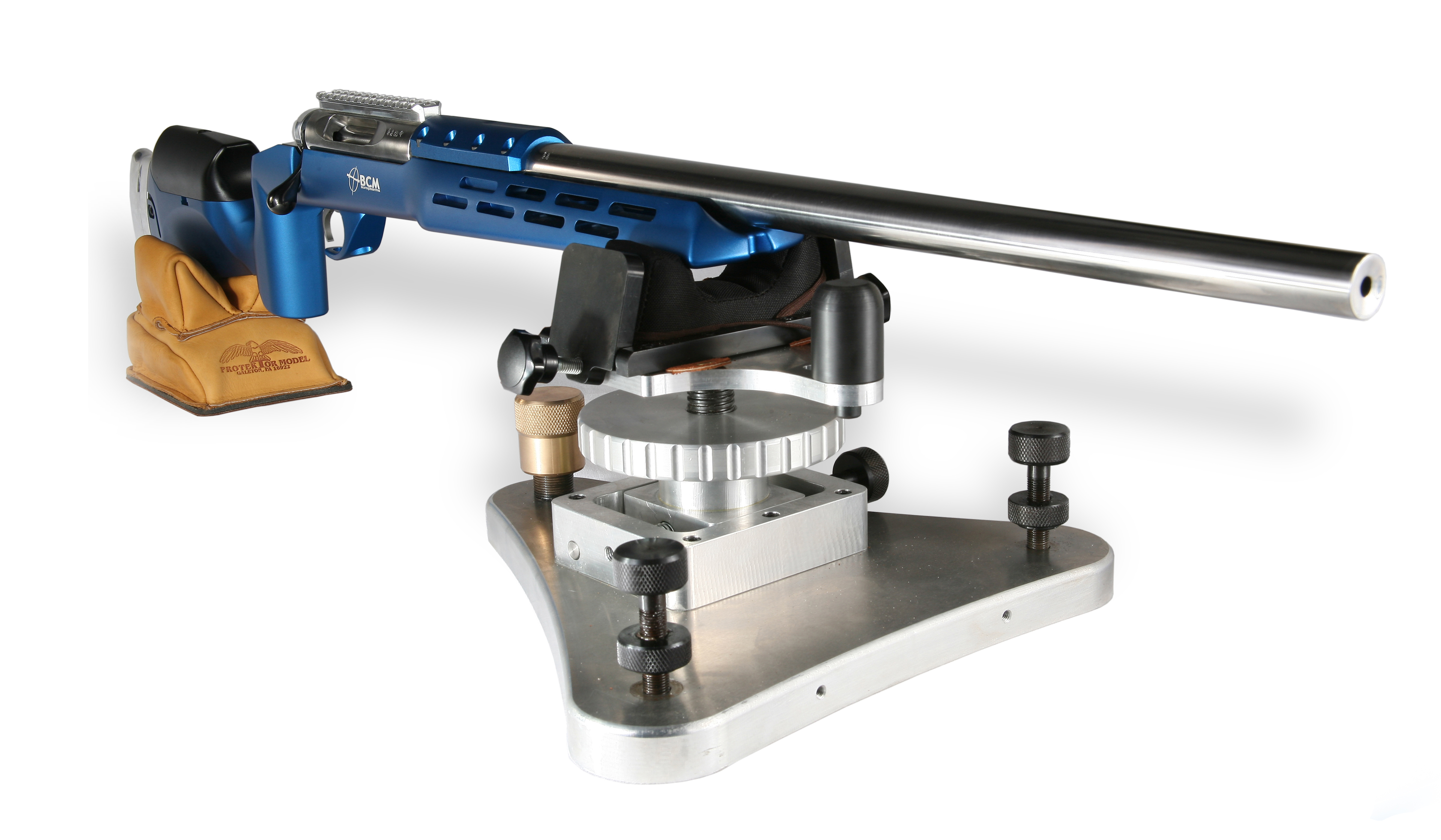
A BCM Europearms single shot benchrest rifle.

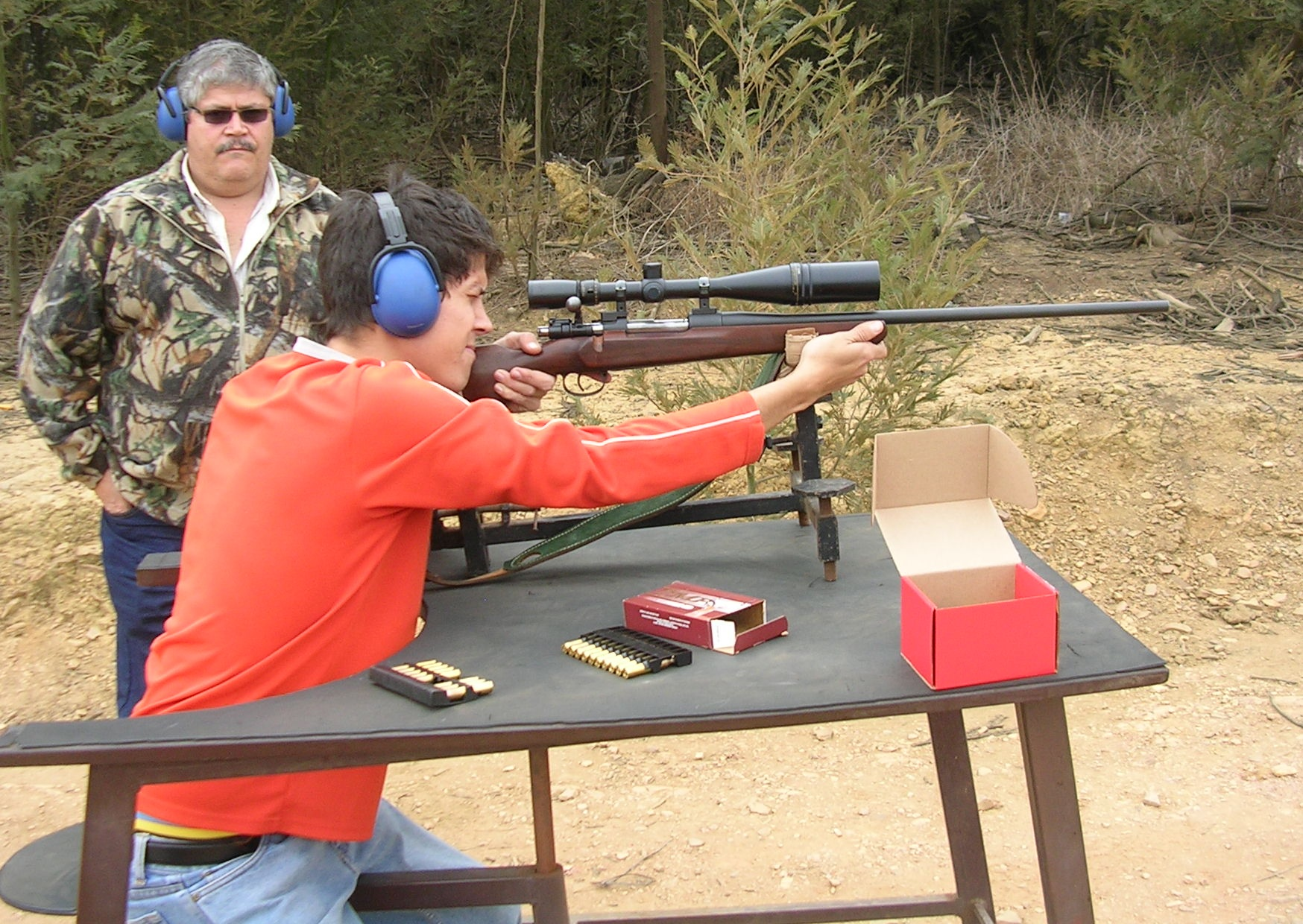
Benchrest shooting with a Mauser rifle. This is an example of the non-competitive use of benchrest techniques. Neither the rifle, the rest, nor the bench shown would be found in formal competition. They show, rather, adaptations of benchrest ideas for the more common hunting rifle.

Rifles are usually custom-made with extreme accuracy in mind. Shooters might use heavy stainless steel barrels, scopes with high power magnification, and handmade stocks of graphite, fiberglass, or carbon fiber. Triggers are usually set to a pull of only a few ounces.

Benchrest shooting grew from varmint hunting, where the shooters would aim for highly accurate rifles, using mostly .22 caliber cartridges. Initially, competitors could use just about any gun they wished. Eventually, classes of guns were created to enhance the sport's competitiveness. For example, the two long-range classes are a 7.7 kilograms (17 lb) maximum Light Gun and an unlimited weight Heavy Gun. Short range (91 to 274 m (100 to 300 yd)) centerfire group shooting encompasses the "Light Varmint" (maximum 4.8 kilograms (10.5 lb) overall), "Heavy Varmint" (6.1 kilograms (13.5 lb) overall), "Sporter" (4.8 kilograms (10.5 lb), and 6.2 millimetres (0.243 in) or greater), and "Unlimited" classes.

The Unlimited class comes very close to living up to its name—just about any single-shot rifle qualifies, up to and including "rail guns", which are rifle barrels and mechanisms built into a machine, or return-to-battery (RTB) rest. With rifles such as these, some initially argued that no shooting skill was involved and was simply a test of the gunsmith's craft. However, shooting an RTB rifle requires a set of skills different than conventional marksmanship. What is removed with the return-to-battery rifle is the need to physically aim the rifle for each shot, and evaluation of how any mirage will affect the shot. Judging the wind is as difficult and important with RTB rifles as with the other rifles. Given their mechanisms, it is arguably harder to compensate for ever-changing wind conditions when using a machine rest; the usual technique is to wait for what seems to be an identical condition rather than holding for the wind. Holding for the wind is quite common with the Light and Heavy Varmint rifles, and does offer certain advantages.

Benchrest matches involve careful reading of wind conditions to compensate for bullet drift, and the rifles and ammunition must be of the highest possible quality. However, claims of the superior position of machining over marksmanship skills in RTB rifle shooting are bolstered by the fact that competitors build their own rifles, and nearly all handload their ammunition to tune it to the rifle.

=== Sights ===
Precision sights are also a requirement. High-quality aperture iron sights could be used, but nearly all benchrest events allow telescopic sights. High magnification scopes are generally preferred; magnifications of 24×, 36×, or higher are common when allowed. Generally, scopes will have turret adjustments to allow the scope to be easily adjusted for various shooting conditions.

For benchrest shooting, scopes with a second focal plane (SFP) reticle and click adjustments of 1/8 moa (approximately 0.036 mil) are most commonly used. Scope models with 0.025 mil and 0.05 mil adjustments are also becoming more available. Lower adjustment values make it possible to more finely adjust the sight towards the center of the target, but at the cost of more adjustments to keep track of. Some also participate with sights intended for hunting or practical long-range shooting (i.e. PRS). Sights intended for practical long-range typically have a reticle in the first focal plane (FFP) and coarser 1/10 mil adjustments.

Table of adjustment and subtensions at different distances
Justering	100 m	200 m	300 m	400 m	500 m	1000 m
0.025 mil	2,5 mm	5 mm	7,5 mm	10 mm	12,5 mm	25 mm
1/8 moa	3,64 mm	7,28 mm	10,92 mm	14,56 mm	18,2 mm	36,4 mm
0.05 mil	5 mm	10 mm	15 mm	20 mm	25 mm	50 mm
1/10 mil	10 mm	20 mm	30 mm	40 mm	50 mm	100 mm

=== Ammunition ===
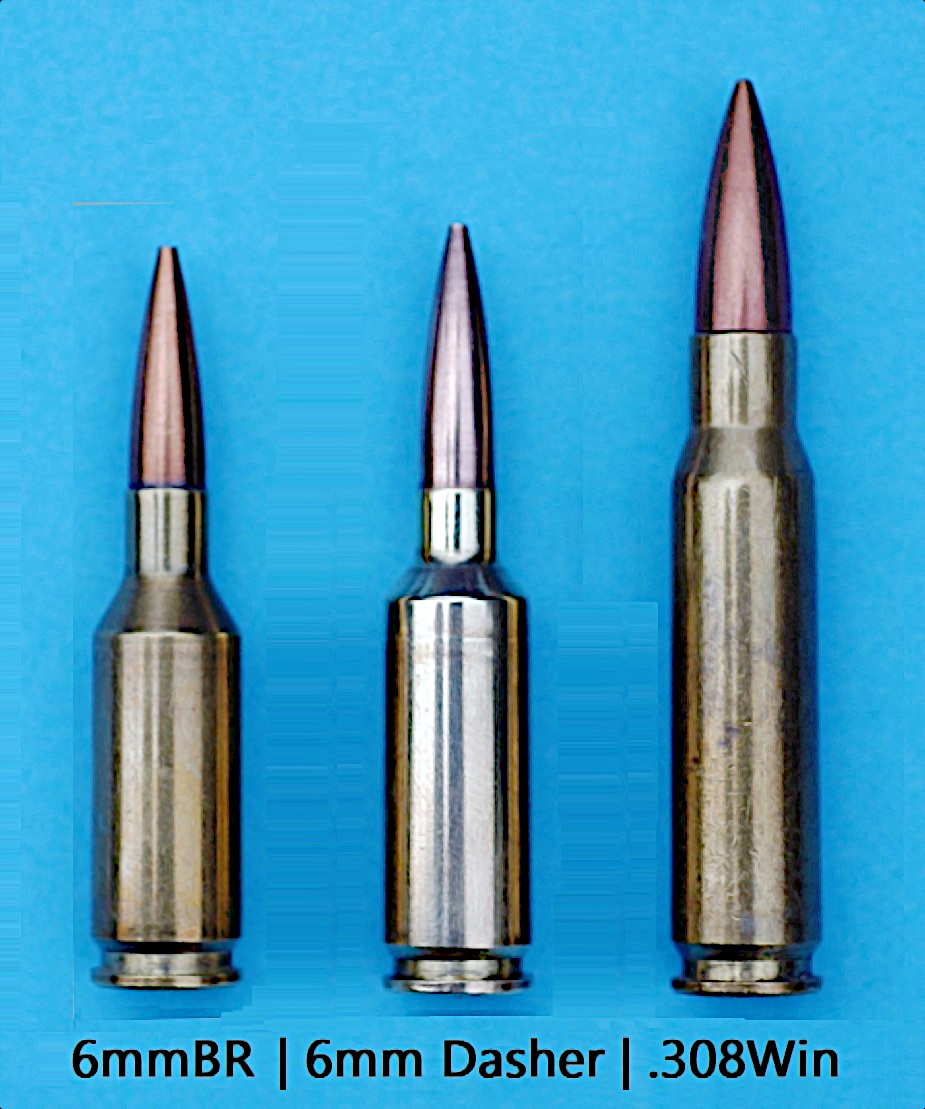
The 6mm BR to the left and 6mm Dasher in the middle are common benchrest cartridges, here compared to a .308 Winchester cartridge to the right.

Only the most consistent and efficient cartridges can provide the necessary accuracy for benchrest shooting. Initially, many chamberings were tried, with the .219 Donaldson Wasp probably being the most common. The .222 Remington dominated the benchrest world from the mid-1950s until around 1975, when the wildcat 6 mm PPC, based on a modified .220 Russian case (which is in turn a boxer-primed derivative of the military 7.62×39mm), took over as the most accurate cartridge. In today's benchrest competitions, short-range group is mainly shot with the 6 mm PPC, while short-range score sees more rifles chambered in the .30 BR. In 550-metre (600 yd) benchrest, the 6 mm BR Norma and a wildcat based on it, the 6 mm Dasher, are currently the most common chamberings. There is no dominant chambering in 910-metre (1,000 yd) competition; choices range from the 6 mm BR and Dasher through the .338 Lapua, with a host of 6 mm, 6.5 mm, 7 mm, and .30 caliber chamberings.

Except where extremely rare competition rules stipulate factory-assembled ammunition, benchrest shooting relies exclusively on hand-loaded ammunition, which is user-assembled, round by round, with painstaking precision. Benchrest shooters' primers, powders and bullets must be of the highest quality available if they are to achieve the shot-to-shot consistency necessary for competitive performances. Most short-range benchrest shooters use precision target-grade bullets made by custom bullet makers. Long-range shooters split about evenly between factory-manufactured and custom-manufactured bullets. Initially, very-low-drag (VLD) bullets were preferred for long range, but both the difficulties in consistent manufacture and fussiness in consistent loading of VLD bullets have led to some compromise designs that have the promise of more consistent performance.

=== Rests ===
Unlimited class rail guns are just barreled actions (the top) that ride directly on a machine rest (the base), no additional rests are needed. The base of the railgun provides adjustable feet to provide a stable position on the bench, and the rifle is aimed with horizontal and vertical adjustments built into the base.

All other rifle types have recognizable stocks, and are fired from dual sandbags; a front bag on an adjustable mechanical platform (some costing half as much as the rifle) and a special rear bag. The stocks of benchrest rifles are designed to rest on the sandbags. With short-range rifles and the lower-recoiling long-range rifles, many competitors shoot "free recoil," where the rifle is not touched at all, save for the finger on the trigger. The sandbags provide all the support. By allowing the rifle to move freely backward, the shooter hopes that the movement under recoil will be as consistent as possible. A few short-range rifles and long-range rifles with heavy recoil must be firmly held, even though the aiming is still done with the positioning of the rests.

=== Wind flags ===
Wind flags are placed on the range between the shooter and the target, and allow a skilled shooter to judge the amount of correction that needs to be made to place each shot precisely on the target. Flags can be home-built or purchased. They generally consist of a wind vane to indicate wind direction, and a cloth (or plastic) streamer and/or propeller to indicate wind speed (the higher the wind, the greater the angle of the streamer or speed of the propeller). Multiple flags are usually used, and they are placed at intervals along the path of the bullet from rifle to target.

== Competitions ==
The Supershoot is usually held the week before Memorial Day in northern Ohio. Approximately 360 shooters from around the world will gather to see who can shoot the smallest average of Light Varmint (5 groups each at 91 and 183 metres (100 and 200 yd)) and Heavy Varmint (5 groups/100/200).

== World Records ==
The World Benchrest Championship is hosted in a different country every two years. On June 27, 2009, a world record was set there at 270 metres (300 yd) with a 1.191 centimetres (0.469 in) five-shot group measured center-to-center.
