= 6mm BR =

US rifle cartridge for benchrest shooting

6mm BR Remington
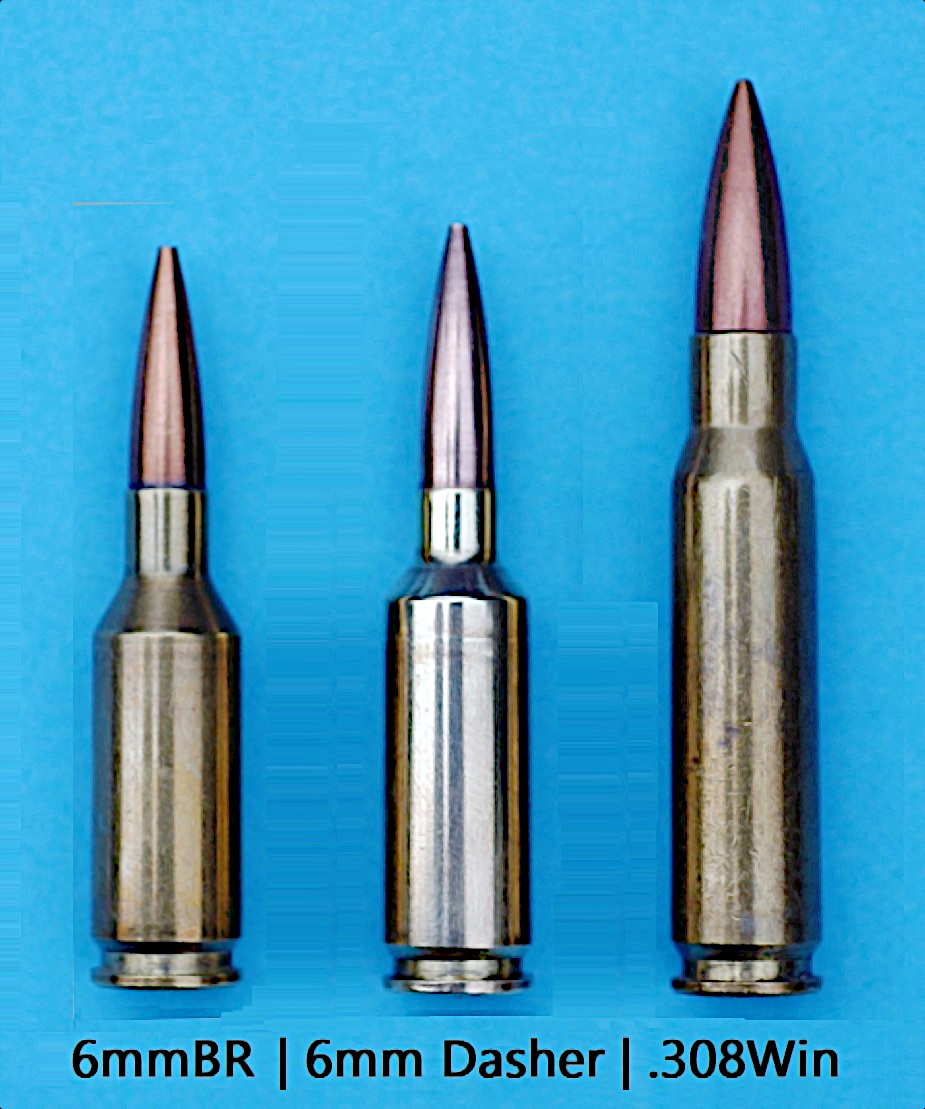
- 6mm BR Norma, 6mm Dasher and .308 Winchester cartridges
- Type: Rifle
- Place of origin: United States

Production history
- Designer: Wildcats: Various; Commercial: Mike Walker
- Designed: Wildcats: 1962-1963; Commercial: 1978
- Produced: 1978–present
- Variants: Several. See article.

Specifications
- Parent case: .308 Winchester
- Case type: Rimless, Bottleneck
- Bullet diameter: .243 in (6.2 mm)
- Neck diameter: .270 in (6.9 mm)
- Shoulder diameter: .458 in (11.6 mm)
- Base diameter: .473 in (12.0 mm)
- Case length: 1.560 in (39.6 mm)
- Rifling twist: 1 in 9 (228.6 mm)
- Primer type: small rifle
- Maximum pressure (C.I.P.): 58,740 psi (405.0 MPa)
- Maximum CUP: 52,000 CUP

6mm BR Norma
- Type: Rifle
- Place of origin: Sweden

Production history
- Manufacturer: Norma
- Produced: 1996
- Variants: 6mm Dasher

Specifications
- Parent case: 6mm BR Remington
- Case type: Semi-rimmed, Bottleneck
- Bullet diameter: 0.243 in (6.2 mm)
- Land diameter: 0.236 in (6.0 mm)
- Neck diameter: 0.271 in (6.9 mm)
- Shoulder diameter: 0.458 in (11.6 mm)
- Base diameter: 0.469 in (11.9 mm)
- Rim diameter: 0.473 in (12.0 mm)
- Rim thickness: 0.054 in (1.4 mm)
- Case length: 1.560 in (39.6 mm)
- Overall length: 2.440 in (62.0 mm)
- Case capacity: 38-39.5 gr (2.45-2.55 ml)
- Rifling twist: 1 in 8 (203.2 mm)
- Primer type: small rifle
- Maximum pressure (C.I.P.): 58,740 psi (405.0 MPa)

Ballistic performance
Bullet mass/type	Velocity	Energy
6.8 g (105 gr) Lapua GB542 Scenar-L (OTM)	815 m/s (2,670 ft/s)	2,258 J (1,665 ft⋅lbf)
6.8 g (105 gr) Lapua Scenar (OTM)	850 m/s (2,800 ft/s)	2,457 J (1,812 ft⋅lbf)
5.8 g (90 gr) Lapua GB543 Scenar-L (OTM)	900 m/s (3,000 ft/s)	2,349 J (1,733 ft⋅lbf)
- Test barrel length: 670mm Source

The 6mm BR / 6.2x39mm is a centerfire cartridge created for benchrest shooting. The cartridge is also known as the 6mm Bench Rest or simply 6 BR, and has also developed a following among varmint hunters because of its efficiency. There are two basic variants of very similar dimensions, known as the 6mm BR Remington and the 6mm Norma BR.

== Cartridge history ==
Soon after the introduction of the .308 Winchester-based wildcat .308×1.5" Barnes cartridge, wildcatters and experimenters began developing their own wildcats based on .308 Winchester. By 1963 there were several .22 (5.56 mm) and .24 (6 mm) caliber cartridges based on the Barnes’ cartridge. The new cartridges’ accuracy and efficiency was noticed by the bench rest shooting community. The .24 caliber (6 mm) cartridge version became known as the 6mm Bench Rest or the 6mm BR due to its widespread use in the sport of bench rest shooting.

Because the cartridge was a wildcat and was not standardized until several years later, several variations of the cartridge existed. Cases required fire forming in the chamber as chambers of the rifles varied from one to another. Several 6mm BR variants exist apart from the Remington and Norma versions: the 6mm BRX, 6mm Dasher, 6 mm BRBS 6 mm UBL and 6mm BR Farè. These wildcat cartridges require reshaping factory cartridge cases and handloading. Over time, some wildcats became standardized and officially listed by the C.I.P. (Commission Internationale Permanente pour l'Epreuve des Armes à Feu Portatives) and commercially available as factory produced brass for handloaders.

=== 6mm BR Remington ===
In 1978 Remington started manufacturing their Remington 40-X rifle in the 6mm BR and named their version of the cartridge the 6mm Bench Rest Remington. By 1988 Remington was also manufacturing ammunition. Remington continues to offer the 6mm BR Remington in the 40-X series rifles. The Remington version of this cartridge is now considered to be obsolete.

=== 6mm BR Norma ===
In 1996 Norma of Sweden introduced the 6mm BR Norma which was dimensionally similar to the 6mm BR Remington. However, the chamber of the Norma version provided a longer throat making allowances for the seating of very low drag (VLD) bullets. It was designed from the beginning to optimize accuracy, barrel life, and case capacity in a 6 mm cartridge for 300–950 metres (328–1,039 yd) target shooting. As such it couples a sensible case volume (2.47 ml) to bore area (29.52 mm^{2}/0.2952 cm^{2}) ratio with ample space for loading relatively long slender projectiles that can provide good aerodynamic efficiency and external ballistic performance for the projectile diameter. This is the most common variation of the cartridge used today.

The 6mm BR Norma has become a popular chambering in match rifles used in 300 metres (328 yd) ISSF and CISM and other 300 metres rifle disciplines.

=== C.I.P listed and ruled variants ===
In 2025 the official C.I.P. (Commission Internationale Permanente pour l'Epreuve des Armes à Feu Portatives) rulings contained four 6mm BR chambering variants.

1. 6mm BR Remington (1994)
2. 6mm BR Norma (1995)
3. 6mm BR Farè (2015)
4. 6mm Dasher (2023)

Becoming listed by the C.I.P. ends the wildcat status of a cartridge by law in C.I.P. member states.

== 6mm BR Remington cartridge dimensions ==
The 6mm BR Remington cartridge is a .308×1.5" Barnes cartridge necked down to accommodate .243 bullets. The .308×1.5" Barnes cartridge is based on the .308 Winchester case shortened to 1.5 inches (38 mm). It is one of the earlier cartridges to follow the short, fat design concept. Short fat cartridges have characteristics that make them more efficient and accurate.

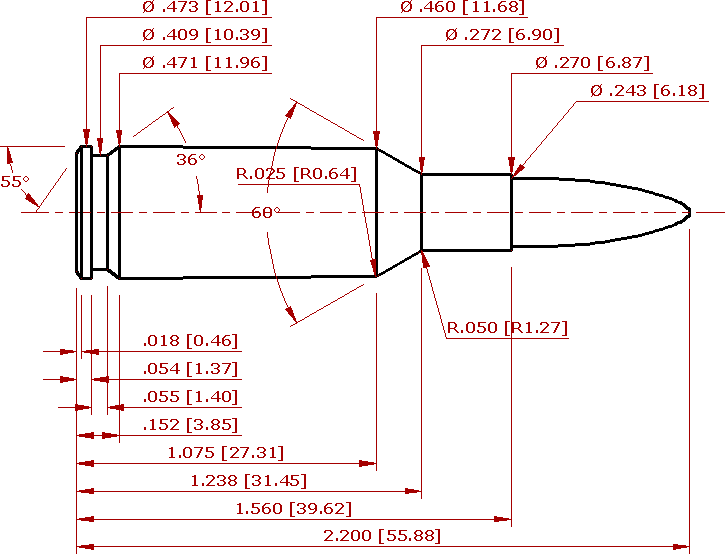

6mm BR Remington maximum C.I.P. cartridge dimensions. All sizes in millimeters (mm).

Americans would define the shoulder angle at alpha/2 = 30 degrees. The common rifling twist rate for this cartridge is 228.600 mm (1 in 9 in), 6 grooves, diameter of lands = 6.02 mm (0.237 in), diameter of grooves = 6.17 mm (0.243 in), land width = 2.29 mm (0.090 in) and the primer type is large rifle.

According to the official C.I.P. (Commission Internationale Permanente pour l'Epreuve des Armes à Feu Portatives) rulings the 6mm BR Remington case can handle up to 405.00 MPa (58,740 psi) P_{max} piezo pressure. In C.I.P. regulated countries every rifle cartridge combo has to be proofed at 125% of this maximum C.I.P. pressure to certify for sale to consumers.

== 6mm BR Norma cartridge dimensions ==
The 6mm BR Norma cartridge was introduced by Norma in 1996. It is based on the 6mm BR Remington cartridge, although where Remington's cartridge was intended for bullets of about 70 grains (4.5 g), Norma standardized their set of chambering specifications for a very low drag (VLD) bullet of over 100 grains (6.5 g), thus realizing the long-range capabilities of the cartridge. This required a much longer throat in rifles chambered for the Norma cartridge.

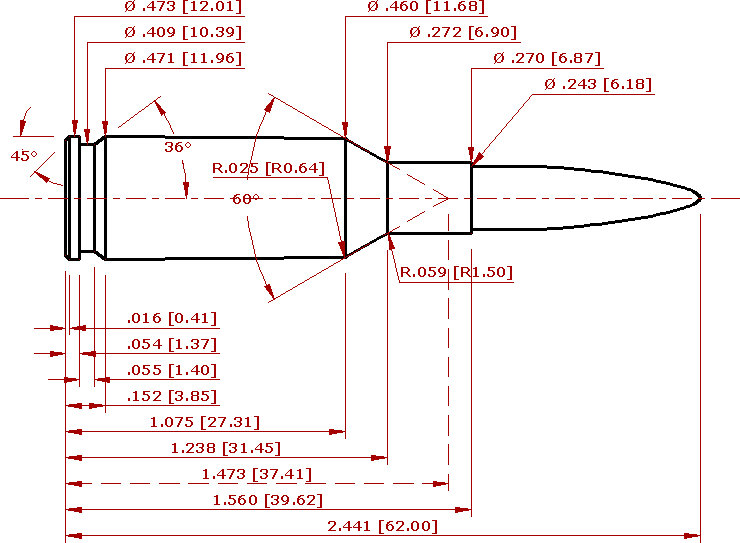

6mm BR Norma maximum C.I.P. cartridge dimensions. All sizes in millimeters (mm).

Americans would define the shoulder angle at alpha/2 = 30 degrees. The common rifling twist rate for this cartridge is 203.20 mm (1 in 8 in), 6 grooves, diameter of lands = 6.02 mm (0.237 in), diameter of grooves = 6.17 mm (0.243 in), land width = 2.29 mm (0.090 in) and the primer type is large rifle.

According to the official C.I.P. (Commission Internationale Permanente pour l'Epreuve des Armes à Feu Portatives) rulings the 6mm Norma BR case can handle up to 405.00 MPa (58,740 psi) P_{max} piezo pressure. In C.I.P. regulated countries every rifle cartridge combo has to be proofed at 125% of this maximum C.I.P. pressure to certify for sale to consumers.

== 6mm Dasher ==
In 2023 the 6mm Dasher became listed by the C.I.P. which ended its wildcat status. The 6mm BR Norma functioned as the parent cartridge for the 6mm Dasher cartridge. Featuring a 40-degree Ackley-type shoulder and about 5 to 10 percent more case capacity over the parent case for obtaining higher muzzle velocities to improve long-range capabilities combined with a barrel common rifling twist rate suited for very low drag (VLD) bullets of over 105 grains (6.8 g).

It is primarily used by competition shooters for 600–1,100 metres (656–1,203 yd) precision shooting disciplines. The 6mm Dasher has been used to set records in the 600 and 1,000 yards (549 and 914 m) benchrest community, and has also become popular among competitors in the Precision Rifle Series (PRS) community. Factory produced 6mm Dasher cartridge cases are commercially available for handloading.

Americans would define the shoulder angle alpha/2 = 40 degrees. The common rifling twist rate for this cartridge is 196.85 mm (1 in 7.75 in), 6 grooves, diameter of lands = 6.02 mm (0.237 in), diameter of grooves = 6.17 mm (0.243 in), land width = 2.29 mm (0.090 in) and the primer type is small rifle.

According to the official C.I.P. (Commission Internationale Permanente pour l'Epreuve des Armes à Feu Portatives) rulings the 6mm Dasher case can handle up to 405.00 MPa (58,740 psi) P_{max} piezo pressure. In C.I.P. regulated countries every rifle cartridge combo has to be proofed at 125% of this maximum C.I.P. pressure to certify for sale to consumers.

== 6mm BR Farè ==
In 2015 the 6mm BR Farè became listed by the C.I.P. which ended its wildcat status. The 6mm BR Farè cartridge originates from Italy and is a high pressure variant, as its P_{max} piezo pressure is rated 35.00 MPa (5,076 psi) over the other C.I.P. listed 6mm BR variants. Factory produced 6mm BR Farè cartridge cases are currently (2025) not commercially available.

Americans would define the shoulder angle alpha/2 ≈ 40.12 degrees. The common rifling twist rate for this cartridge is 203.20 mm (1 in 8 in), 6 grooves, diameter of lands = 6.02 mm (0.237 in), diameter of grooves = 6.17 mm (0.243 in), land width = 2.29 mm (0.090 in) and the primer type is large rifle.

According to the official C.I.P. (Commission Internationale Permanente pour l'Epreuve des Armes à Feu Portatives) rulings the 6mm BR Farè case can handle up to 440.00 MPa (63,817 psi) P_{max} piezo pressure. In C.I.P. regulated countries every rifle cartridge combo has to be proofed at 125% of this maximum C.I.P. pressure to certify for sale to consumers.

== See also ==
- List of rifle cartridges
- 6 mm caliber
