= Sighting in =

Preparatory firearm calibration

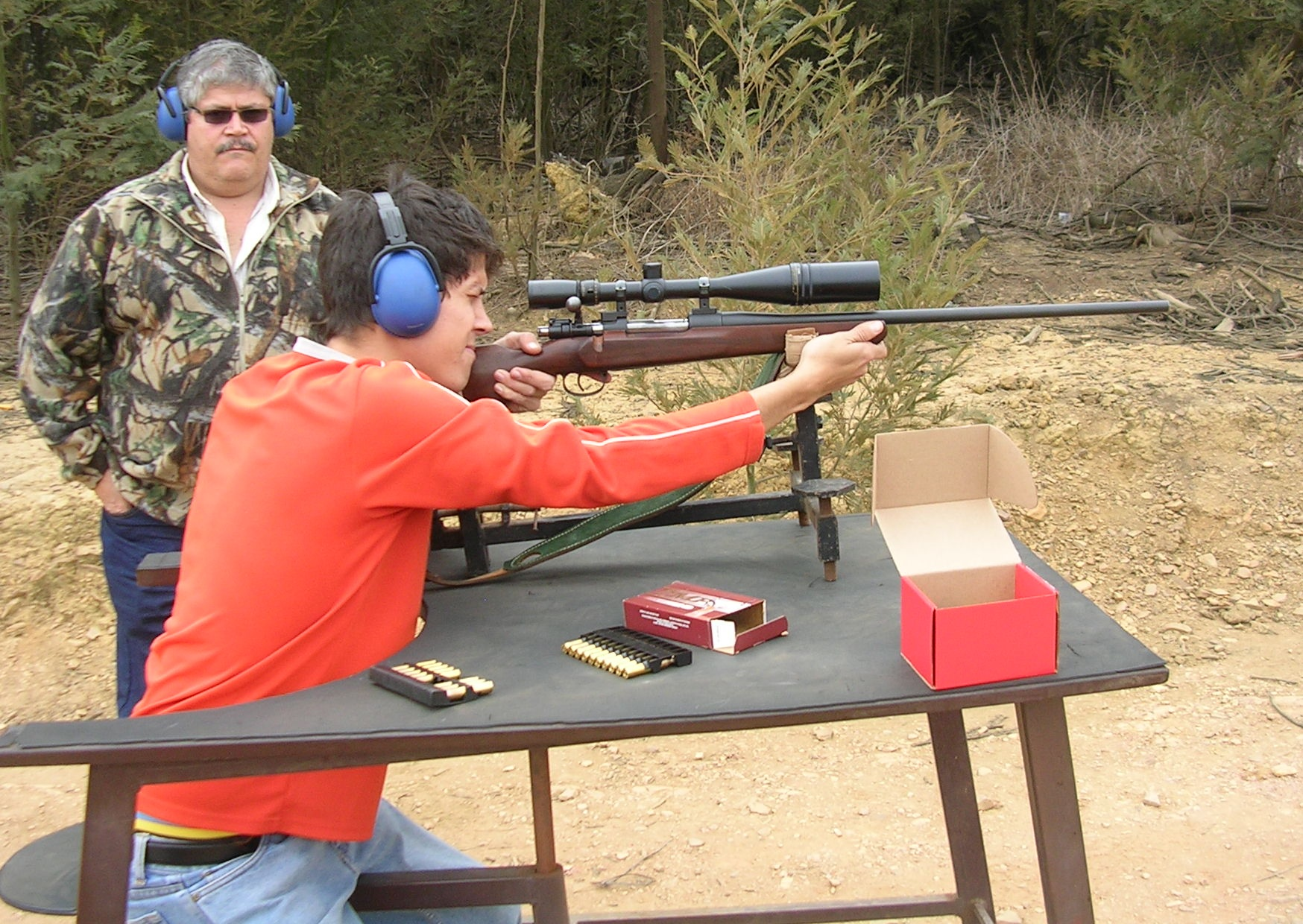
Sighting in from a bench rest

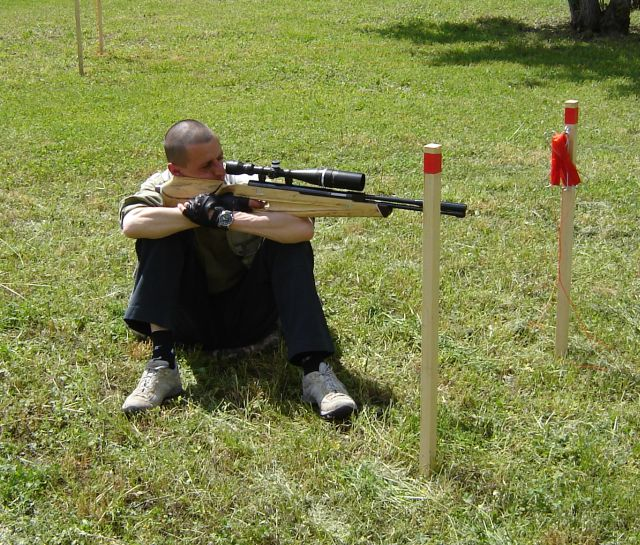
Sighting in from a stable sitting position

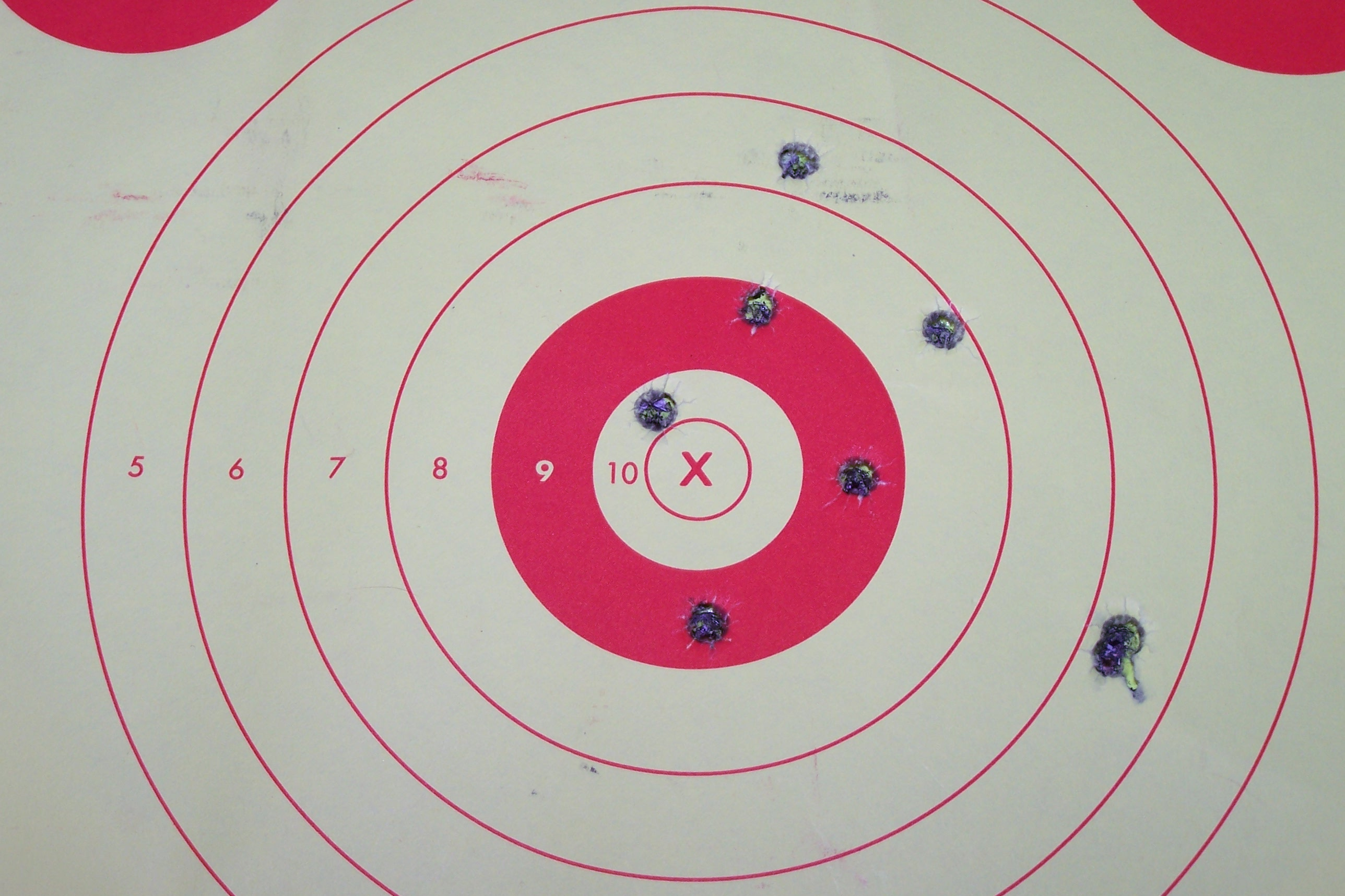
A useful target for sighting in showing an eight-shot group requiring sight adjustment to move averaged point of impact to the left.

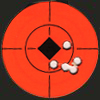
This five-shot group requires sight adjustment to move the averaged point of impact up and to the left.

This four-shot group requires sight adjustment to move the averaged point of impact to the right and slightly higher.

This four-shot group requires no sight adjustment, but a larger number of shots might confirm preliminary indications the group may be slightly left of center.

In ranged weapons such as firearms and artillery pieces, the act of sighting in or sight-in is a preparatory or corrective calibration of the sights with the goal of having the projectile (e.g. bullet or shell) placed on a predictable impact position in relation to the sight picture. The principle of sighting-in is to shift the line of aim until it intersects the parabolic projectile trajectory at a designated point of reference, so when the gun is fired in the future (provided there is reliable precision) it will repeatably hit where it aims at identical distances of that designated point.

Because when using a telescopic sight, the crosshair lines geometrically resemble the X- and Y-axis of the Cartesian coordinate system where the reticle center is analogous to the origin point (i.e. coordinate [0,0]), the designated sighting-in point is known as a zero, and the act of sighting-in is therefore also called zeroing. A gunsight that remains true to its designated zero after repeated usage is known as to "hold zero", while one that fails to do so is known as to "lose zero".

The iterative procedure involves firing a group of shots from a cool gun barrel, then determining the geometric center of the shot pattern, adjusting the sights to move the point of aim to that group center, and repeating the process until further groups consistently center on the point of aim.

== Grouping ==
Bullets discharged from a firearm immobilized in a device such as a Mann rest may not always land in precisely the same spot. Some of that variation may be caused by wind conditions or ammunition differences, but individual firearms may have differing abilities to place bullets consistently. Bullet impact positions at a measured distance from the firearm muzzle are evaluated as shot groupings or groups. Each group consists of a given number of shots with increasing numbers of shots providing greater statistical confidence. Each group is described by the minimum diameter circle perpendicular to the axis of bullet movement including the impact point of all bullets in that group. A firearm consistently placing bullets within a 1 inch (25 mm) diameter circle on a target 100 yards (91 m) from the muzzle might be described as capable of 1-inch groups at 100 yards. Groups may alternatively be described by the angle of dispersion. A one-inch group at 100 yards is approximately equivalent to one minute of angle, indicating that firearm would be expected to place bullets within a two-inch group at 200 yards, or within a three-inch group at 300 yards. Terminology may be confusing. Groups should not be confused with the patterns traditionally used to describe the positioning of a specified percentage of the multiple pellets from an individual shotgun shell.

== Reasons for sighting in ==
Firearms carried by individuals may be positioned differently from one shot to the next. Most firearms have sights to assist the shooter in positioning the firearm so bullets will strike the desired location. Precision machining used in manufacture of modern firearms and testing prior to distribution have improved the probability these sights will be correctly positioned; but various factors may cause bullet placement to be different from expected:

- Sights may have been loosened or moved from their intended positions since the last test firing.
- Optional telescopic sights may have replaced original iron sights.
- The firearm may have been sighted in for a different target distance.
- The shooter may be using different ammunition than used for previous testing.
- The shooter may involuntarily move the firearm while pulling the trigger.
- The shooter may hold the firearm in a way allowing unanticipated movement during recoil.
- The shooter may have vision abnormalities producing an unanticipated sight picture.

== Targets ==
Sighting in a firearm is an important test of the ability of the firearm user to hit anticipated targets with available ammunition. Pictures or silhouettes of intended targets are less suitable for sighting in than high contrast shapes compatible with the type of sights on the firearm. Contrasting circles are commonly used as sighting in targets. Some targets include a faint grid for easier measurement of horizontal and vertical distance from point of aim. These circle targets are especially suitable for peep sights, aperture sights, dot reticles, and bead front sights; and are most useful when the apparent diameter of that sight feature matches the apparent diameter of the contrasting circle at the selected distance to target. Firearms with blade front sights and notch rear sights may reduce vertical dispersion by using a sight picture visually balancing the target's contrasting circle on a horizontal sight surface like the top of the blade or horizontal notched surface.

== Procedure ==
The diameter of the group for a single sight setting is irrelevant to the sighting in procedure so long as all bullet positions can be measured to determine average point of impact in comparison to point of aim. Larger diameter groups indicate reduced hit probability on smaller targets at that range and suggest groups with a larger number of shots may provide better estimates of required adjustments. Sighting in is most effective from a stable shooting position allowing the shooter to relax while the firearm is supported on a bench rest or on a sandbag or similar padding supported by a rock, log, or tree branch. Other stable shooting positions include sitting on the ground while leaning against a tree or structure and resting the firearm on an arm supported by the knees. The sights are examined prior to firing to be certain they are firmly fastened to the firearm and are not loose or moving between shots. Boresighting or firing single shots at a close range target may be required if shots do not hit the target at the desired distance. After sights have been adjusted to reliably place bullets on target at the desired range, several shots are fired to form a group for measurement of averaged bullet placement. Each bullet position is measured horizontally and vertically from the point of aim, and sights are adjusted to compensate for the mean horizontal distance and mean vertical distance from the point of aim. After the sights have been adjusted, more shots may be fired from a cool barrel forming another group to verify that sight adjustment moved the average bullet placement onto the point of aim. Sighting in has been completed when the group is centered on the point of aim. Bullets may then be fired at targets at different distances to determine trajectory differences from point of aim at those distances.

== See also ==
- Target acquisition
