= Estonian Baseball and Softball Federation =

Sports governing body in Estonia

Estonian Baseball and Softball Federation (abbreviation EBSF; Estonian: Eesti Pesapalli ja Softpalli Liit) was a baseball and softball sport governing body in Estonia.

The last president of EBSF was Tauno Koppel.

EBSF was established in 2008. and ended 30 November 2015.
