= World Benchrest Shooting Federation =

- Jurisdiction: International
- Abbreviation: WBSF
- Founded: 2001

Official website
- worldbenchrest.com

The World Benchrest Shooting Federation (WBSF) is the international governing body for benchrest shooting, with disciplines for both centerfire and rimfire ammunition. WBSF was formed in 2001.

== Disciplines ==
=== Rimfire ===
- 50 m or 50 yd (46 m)
- Teams (3 shooters, with 6 targets each)
- Individual (6 targets)

=== Two Gun ===
- Teams
- Individual

=== Light Varmint (LV) ===
- Small Group 100 m (or 100 yards (91 m))
- Small Group 200 m (or 200 yards (180 m))
- 100 m aggregate (or 100 yards (91 m))
- 200 m aggregate (or 200 yards (180 m))
- Grand Aggregate

=== Heavy Varmint (HV) ===
- Small Group 100 m (or 100 yards (91 m))
- Small Group 200 m (or 200 yards (180 m))
- Small Group 300 m (or 300 yards (270 m))
- 100 m aggregate (or 100 yards (91 m))
- 200 m aggregate (or 200 yards (180 m))
- 300 m aggregate (or 300 yards (270 m))
- Grand Aggregate
- Small Group 200 m x10 Shots (or 200 yards (180 m))
- 200 m x10 Shots Aggregate (or 200 yards (180 m))

== Targets ==
WBSF Rimfire Target

- The 10 ring has a diameter of 6,35 mm (0.25 inches), which is 0.06 mrad at 50 meters.
- The inner ten ring has a diameter of 0,8 mm (0.03 inches), 0.02 mrad at 50 meters.

== Records ==
=== World Records ===
Official records of the World Benchrest Shooting Federation

- Rimfire:

- Stephane Gomel (France) 250 - 25X (WBSF World Championship Manresa 2018 Spain) - (shooting time 30 minutes)

- Hervé Lefebre (Belgium) 250 - 24X (WBSF World Championship Valencia 2024 Spain) - (shooting time 20 minutes)

- Luciano Viviani (Italy) 750 - 61X (WBSF World Championship Valencia 2024 Spain) - (shooting 3 Target every one in time 20 minutes)

=== European Records ===
Below are the official records of the European Benchrest Shooting Federation (EBSF) as of February 2017.

Aggregates

Competitor	Competition	mm	mrad	MOA
(Norway) Paal Erik Jensen	LV 100	5.092 mm	0.05092 mrad	0.1834 MOA
(France) Roger Serain	LV 200	10.062 mm	0.05301 mrad	0.2082 MOA
(France) Jean Louis Espinet	HV 100	4.250 mm	0.0425 mrad	0.1530 MOA
(Italy) Attilio Serrone	HV 200	10.458 mm	0.05229 mrad	0.1882 MOA

Grand Aggregates

Competitor	Competition	mm	mrad	MOA
(France) Roger Serain	LV GA	5.130 mm	0.6350 mrad	0.1847 MOA
(France) Roger Serain	HV GA	6.221 mm	0.7700 mrad	0.2240 MOA
(France) Roger Serain	2 GUN	5.675 mm	0.7013 mrad	0.2040 MOA
(France) R. Serain, (France) JC. Eymieu, (France) G. Lang and (France) P. Fischbach	2 GUN TEAM	7.359 mm	0.9110 mrad	0.2650 MOA

Small Groups

Competitor	Competition	mm	mrad	MOA
(Spain) Antonio Sanchez Perez	LV 100	2.410 mm	0.0241 mrad	0.0867 MOA
(France) Roger Serain	LV 200	5.080 mm	0.0254 mrad	0.0914 MOA
(Italy) Jean Claude Braconi	HV 100	1.270 mm	0.0127 mrad	0.0493 MOA
(France) Pascal Fishbach	HV 200	4.370 mm	0.02185 mrad	0.0786 MOA

== See also ==
- List of shooting sports organizations
- World Rimfire and Air Rifle Benchrest Federation
