= Intermediate cartridge =

Firearm ammunition between pistol and full-power rifle

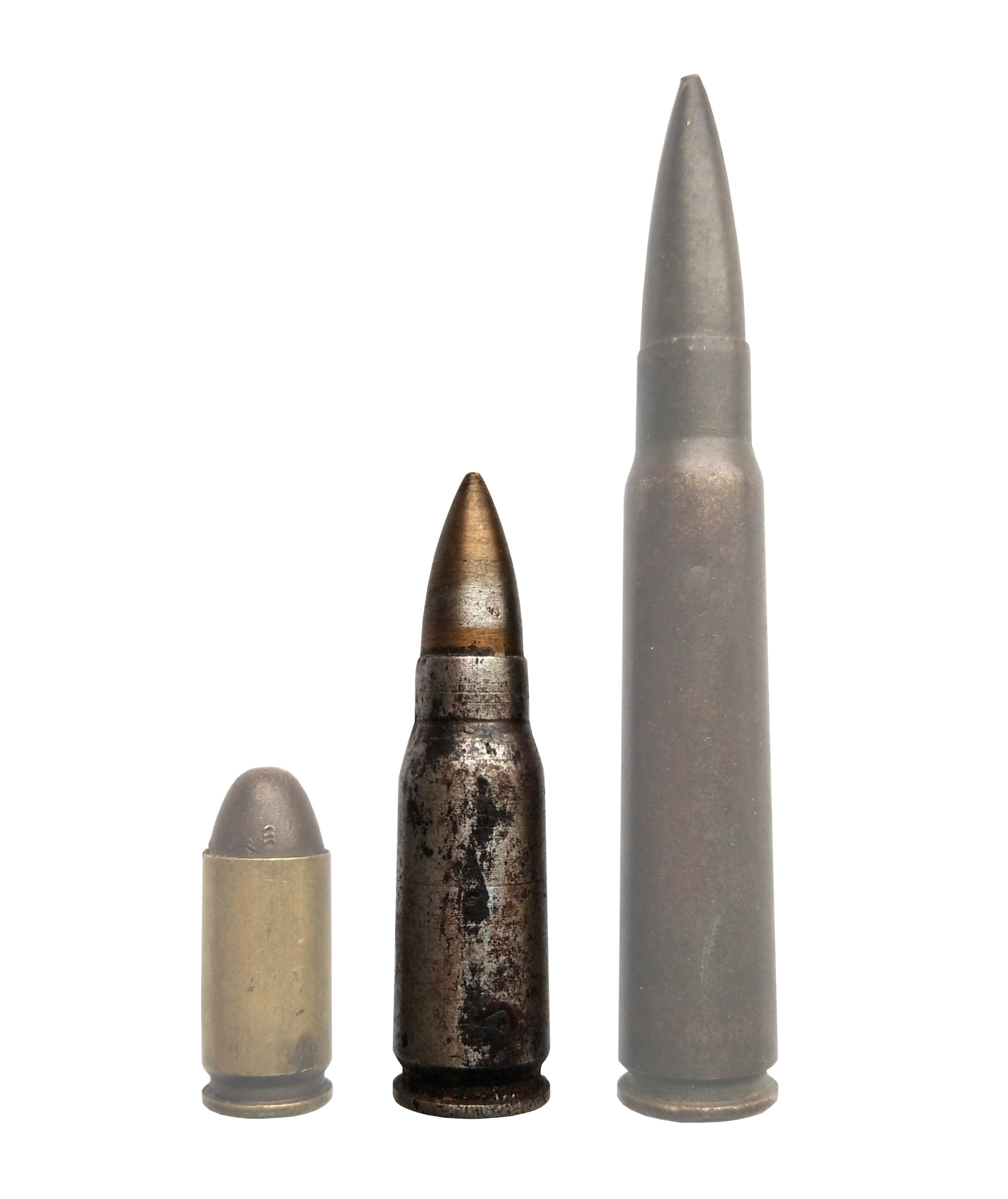
From left to right: 9×19mm (pistol cartridge) 7.92×33mm (intermediate cartridge) 7.92×57mm (fully powered cartridge)

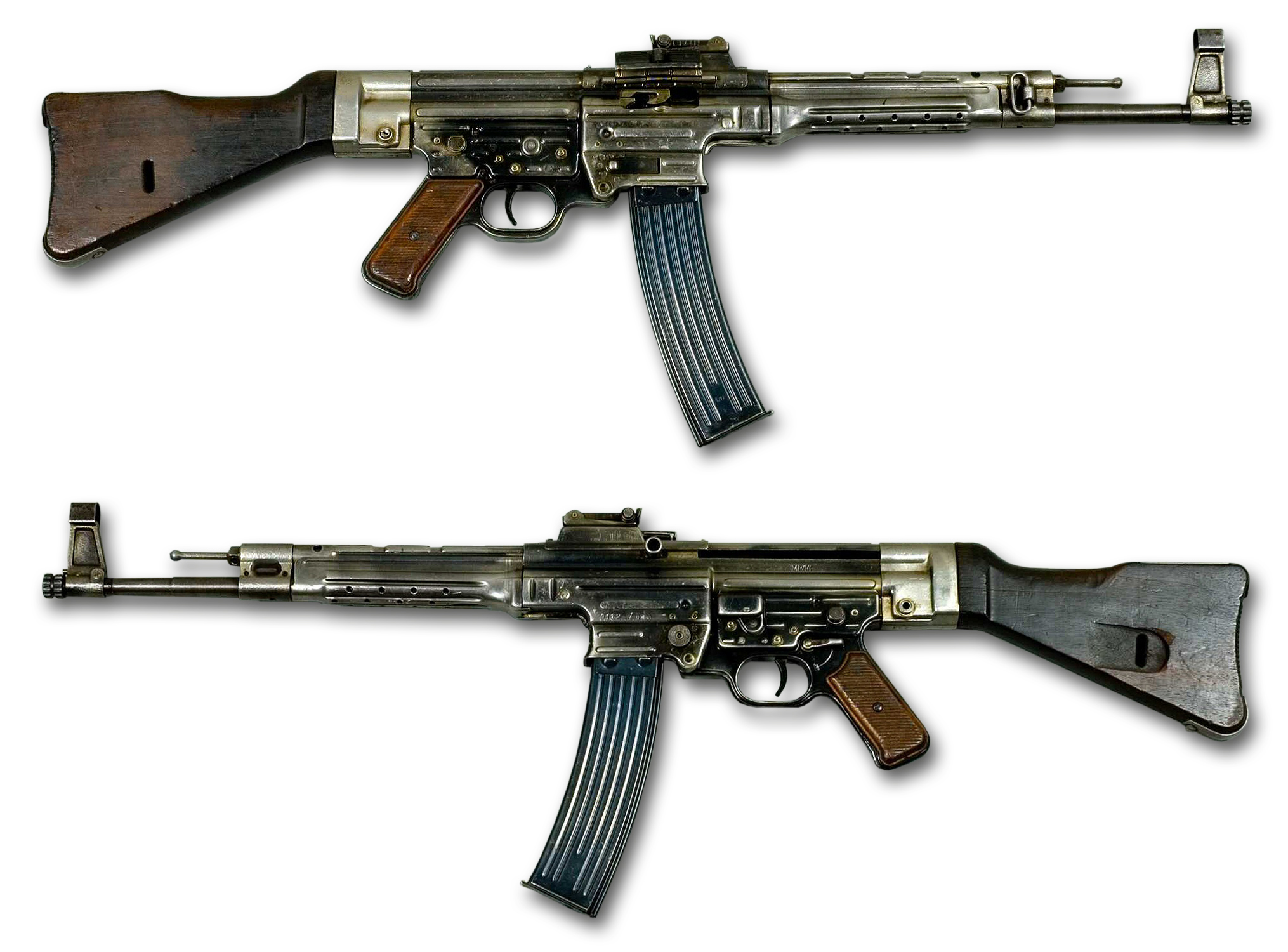
The Sturmgewehr 44, a development of the earlier Maschinenkarabiner 42(H)

An intermediate cartridge is a rifle/carbine cartridge that has significantly greater power than a pistol cartridge but still has a reduced muzzle energy compared to fully powered cartridges (such as the .303 British, 7.62×54mmR, 7.65×53mm Mauser, 7.92×57mm Mauser, 7.7×58mm Arisaka, .30-06 Springfield, or 7.62×51mm NATO), and therefore is regarded as being "intermediate" between traditional rifle and handgun cartridges.

As their recoil is significantly reduced compared to full-power cartridges, fully automatic rifles firing intermediate cartridges are relatively easy to control. However, even though they are less powerful than a traditional full-power cartridge, the external ballistics are still sufficient for an effective range of 300–600 metres (330–660 yd), which covers most typical infantry engagement situations in modern warfare. This allowed for the development of the assault rifle, a type of versatile selective fire small arms that is lighter and more compact than traditional battle rifles that fire full-power cartridges.

The first known early intermediate cartridge to see service was the 10.4x38mmR Swiss used in the Vetterli rifle which gave it controllable handling and a then high-capacity magazine of 12 rounds. Predominant intermediate cartridges in mainstream circulation came around 50 years later and saw widespread use with the German 7.92×33mm Kurz used in the StG 44 and the .30 Carbine used in the American M2 select fire carbine during the late years and closing days of World War II.

With the data collected during World War II and the Korean War, the benefits of intermediate cartridges became apparent. This resulted in the development of "modern" cartridges such as the Soviet 7.62×39mm M43 (used in the SKS, AK-47 and AKM). Later, an international tendency emerged towards relatively small-sized, lightweight, high-velocity intermediate military service cartridges. Cartridges like the American 5.56×45mm M193 (1964; originally used in the M16), Soviet 5.45×39mm M74 (1974; used in the AK-74, which replaced the AKM), Belgian SS109 / 5.56×45mm NATO (1980; used in most AR-15 systems), and the Chinese 5.8×42mm (1987; used in the QBZ-95) allow a soldier to carry more ammunition for the same weight compared to their larger and heavier predecessor cartridges, have favourable maximum point-blank range or "battle zero" characteristics and produce relatively low bolt thrust and free recoil impulse, favouring lightweight arms design and automatic fire accuracy.

== History ==
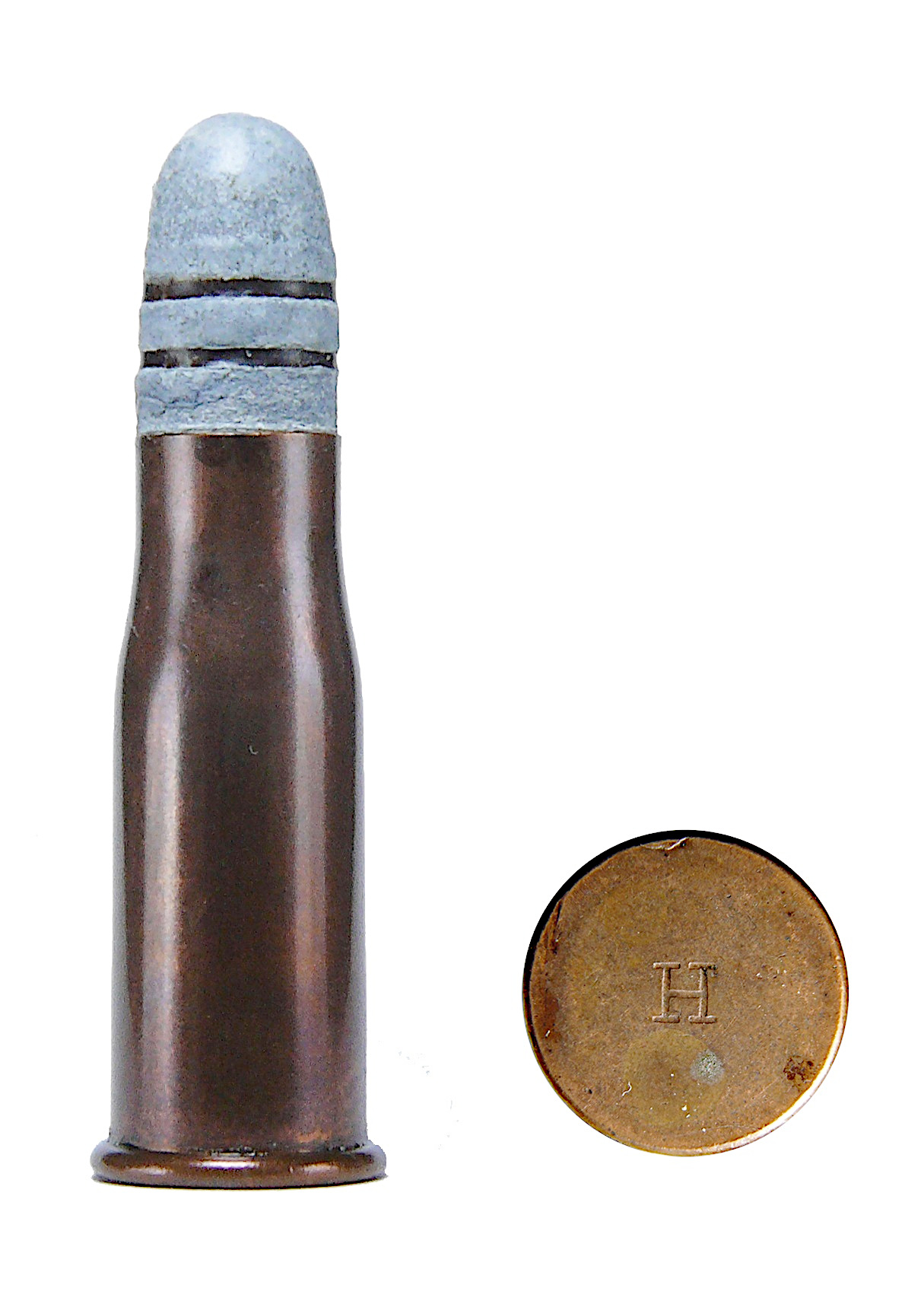
The 10.4x38mmR Swiss is an early example of an Intermediate cartridge.

=== High power rounds ===
The late 19th and early 20th century saw the introduction of smokeless powder cartridges with small caliber jacketed spitzer bullets that extended the effective range of fire beyond the limitations of the open rifle sights. The Maxim gun, the world's first machine gun, was devised in 1885, and a year later, the Lebel Model 1886 rifle had the distinction of being the world's first smokeless powder bolt-action rifle.

In the years leading up to World War I, the Lebel set an international example, and smokeless powder high power service cartridges and service rifles began to be produced by all the world's great powers. This included, but was not limited to, the German Gewehr 98, the British Lee–Enfield, the Russian Mosin–Nagant, and the American M1903 Springfield. These rifles weighed over 8 lb (3.6 kg), and they were longer than 40 in (1,000 mm) and as such were generally inappropriate for close combat. They fired cartridges and featured iron sight lines designed in an age when military doctrine expected rifle shots at ranges out to over 1,000 m (1,100 yd) for simultaneous fire at distant area targets like ranks of enemies, but typical combat ranges were much shorter, around 100–300 metres (110–330 yd), rarely exceeding 500 metres (550 yd).

=== Introduction of semi- and full-auto weapons as service firearms ===
World War II revealed the demand for better fire density in infantry operations. To achieve this goal, both Allied and Axis countries rapidly developed and produced a number of semi-automatic service rifles, such as American M1 Garand, Soviet SVT-40 and the German Gewehr 43. Compared to their bolt-action predecessors, these weapons provided a considerably higher effective fire rate. In 1951, the US military published a study on the M1 Garand's fire rate: a trained soldier averaged 40–50 accurate shots per minute at a range of 300 m (330 yd). "At ranges over 500 m (550 yd), a battlefield target is hard for the average rifleman to hit. Therefore, 500 m (550 yd) is considered the maximum effective range, even though the rifle is accurate at much greater ranges".

Simultaneously, armies of both sides had put submachine guns to extensive use. Soviet PPSh-41 and PPS-43, US Thompson, British Sten and the German MP-40 had an even higher fire rate (and thus higher fire density) compared to larger-caliber semi auto rifles, but their effective range was considerably shorter: e.g., 164 yd (150 m) vs 500 yd (460 m) for Thompson and M1 Garand, respectively. SMG, chambered in pistol calibers (7.62x25, 9x19 Parabellum and .45 ACP) lacked penetration provided by larger and faster rifle bullets.

Seeking to combine the rapid fire capabilities of SMG and advantages of the rifle calibers, both Allied and Axis powers developed a range of early automatic rifles. The first automatic rifles to be adopted by the fighting armies were the German FG42 and Sturmgewehr 44.

=== Demand for lighter ammunition ===
Although efficient in the battlefield, early automatic rifles had a considerable drawback compared to both semi-automatic rifles and submachine guns. With a fire rate of 600-1000 rounds per minute, automatic rifles increased the amount of ammo a soldier had to carry. However, the ammo was much heavier (393 gr (25.4 g) for 7.62 x 51 round compared to 160 gr (10.4 g) for .45 ACP), effectively limiting the ammo load.

Additionally, when fired in full automatic mode free recoil delivered by full-sized and full-powered cartridges became an issue, too.

Though technically a full-powered cartridge, the first one to fulfil this requirement may have been the Japanese 6.5×50mm Arisaka used by the Russian Fedorov Avtomat rifle, used in limited numbers from 1915 to 1917 (the cartridge itself dates back to 1897). The Fedorov was arguably the first assault rifle.

This led to a series of early attempts to produce a lower-powered round using existing calibers. Examples include the US .30 Carbine cartridge for the M1 Carbine and the German 7.92×33mm Kurz, a shortened version of the standard 7.92×57mm Mauser round used in the StG-44, which is more commonly considered to be the first assault rifle. The Soviets developed a similar round, the 7.62×39mm, for the SKS but far better known as the round for the post-war AK-47.

=== Post-war developments ===
These earlier examples were generally developed with the goal being ease of development and logistics, and lacked any rigorous study of their performance. In the immediate post-war era, the British Army began such a study with an eye to replacing its pre-World War I .303 British. The .303 had been slated for replacement repeatedly, but a series of events kept it in service decades longer than expected. Their studies led to a new purpose-designed intermediate round, the .280 British, along with new weapons to fire it. The round attracted significant interest among other UK-oriented forces, but during NATO standardization effort the US was dead-set against any reduction in power. The British EM-2 bullpup rifle used an intermediate round, and was issued in limited numbers in the 1950s but the 7.62×51mm NATO was selected and it was removed from service.

In practice, the 7.62×51mm NATO was found to be too powerful for select-fire weapons, as the British testing had warned. When the US entered the Vietnam War it was armed with the semi-automatic M14 rifle while facing increasing numbers of full-automatic AK-47s. Demands for a select-fire weapon were constant but the Army was slow to respond. An ARPA program cleared the way for small numbers of a new and much smaller round, the .223 Remington, to be introduced to combat by special forces. Field reports were extremely favorable, leading to the introduction of the M16 rifle.

=== Universal service cartridge ===
Some militaries have considered the adoption of a 'universal service cartridge' – a replacement of small caliber, high-velocity intermediate cartridges and full-power cartridges with a cartridge at the larger end of the intermediate cartridge spectrum, well suited for both assault rifle and general-purpose machine gun use in the 6mm to 7mm caliber range, with external and terminal ballistic performance close or equal to the 7.62×51mm NATO and 7.62×54mmR full-power cartridges.

The US Army conducted testing of telescoped ammunition, polymer-cased ammunition, and caseless ammunition for future service cartridges. As of 2022, the candidate for US Army universal cartridge is the 6.8×51mm Common Cartridge, selected by the US Next Generation Squad Weapon Program. This cartridge has a muzzle energy even higher than 7.62×51mm NATO.

== Characteristics ==
Typical intermediate cartridges have:

- Bottlenecked, rimless cartridge
- According to the official C.I.P. (Commission Internationale Permanente pour l'Epreuve des Armes à Feu Portatives) and NATO EPVAT rulings the maximum service pressures range between 320.00–430.00 MPa (46,412–62,366 psi) P_{max} piezo pressure
- Muzzle energies ranging between 1,250–2,500 J (922–1,844 ft⋅lbf)
- Muzzle velocities ranging between 700–950 m/s (2,297–3,117 ft/s)
- Relatively low O_{ratios} ranging between 2.87 and 7.99

== List of intermediate cartridges ==
=== LE and Paramilitary ===
Cartridges issued to Law Enforcement and Paramilitary forces were or are chambered for.

- .22 Spitfire cartridge of the Iver Johnson Spitfire
- .221 Remington Fireball
- .300 AAC Blackout
- .375 SOCOM
- .450 Bushmaster
- .45 Raptor
- .458 HAM'R
- .458 SOCOM
- .50 Beowulf
- .500 Auto Max cartridge of the AR500
- 6.5mm Grendel
- 7.62×37mm Musang
- 7.62×45mm Pindad cartridge of the Sabhara/Police V1-V2
- 8.6 mm Blackout
- 9×39mm
- 6.8mm Remington SPC (6.8×43mm)
- 12.7×55mm STs-130

=== Service cartridges ===
Service cartridges are cartridges the service rifles of armies were or are chambered for.

- 5.45×39mm cartridge of the AK-74 assault rifle
- 5.56×45mm NATO (.223 Remington) of the M16 assault rifle and M4 carbine
- 5.8×42mm cartridge of the QBZ-95 assault rifle
- .30 Carbine (7.62×33mm) cartridge of the US M2 select fire carbine and M1 semi-automatic carbine
- .345 Winchester Self-Loading of the Winchester-Burton M1917 automatic rifle
- .351 Winchester Self-Loading of the Winchester Model 1907 semi-automatic rifle
- 7.62×39mm cartridge of the AK-47 assault rifle and SKS semi-automatic carbine
- 7.62×45mm cartridge of the vz. 52 semi-automatic rifle
- 7.92×33mm Kurz cartridge of the StG 44 assault rifle

=== Premodern ===
Cartridges predating the modern era were chambered for.

- 10.4x38mmR Swiss cartridge of the Vetterli rifle
- 10.4×47mmR cartridge of the M1870 Italian Vetterli
- 11x42mmR Albini-Comblain cartridge of the M1870 Belgian Comblain
- 11×50mmR Comblain cartridge of the M1870 Belgian Comblain
- 11mm Beaumont cartridge of the M1871 Beaumont rifle
- 12.17×42mm RF
- 12x46mmR Musket Spain XPL
- .43 Spanish Carbine
- .45-75 WCF
- .433 Egyptian
- .50-70 Government
- 15.24х40R Krnka

=== Commercial ===
Cartridges privately sold on the civilian market.

- Calhoon cartridges
- .17 Mach IV
- .17 Remington
- .17 Remington Fireball
- .20 VarTarg
- 5 mm/35 SMc
- .20 Tactical
- .204 Ruger
- 5.6×39mm
- .22-250 Remington
- .22 PPC
- .219 Zipper
- .224 Valkyrie
- .222 Remington
- .225 Winchester
- 6mm BR
- 6mm PPC
- 6 mm XC
- 6mm ARC
- 6mm AR
- 6×45mm
- .25-45 Sharps
- .250-3000 Savage
- .277 Wolverine
- 7mm BR Remington
- 7×33mm Sako
- 7.62×40mm Wilson Tactical
- .30 Remington AR
- .350 Legend
- .35 Remington
- .360 Buckhammer
- .400 Legend
- .401 Winchester Self-Loading

=== Prototype cartridges ===
Cartridges tested for standard issue or research were or are chambered for.

- .351 Winchester Self-Loading cartridge for the Winchester Model 1907
- .345 Winchester Self-Loading cartridge for the Winchester Burton Machine Rifle
- 4.32x45mm SBR
- 4.5×26mm MKR, one of the smallest assault rifle cartridges
- 4.6×36mm
- 4.85×49mm cartridge of the experimental Enfield IW assault rifle
- 5.6x48mm Eiger cartridge of the W+F Stgw 70 and W+F Stgw 71 assault rifles
- 6×45mm SAW cartridge of the experimental Rodman Laboratories XM235 light machine gun, a project which terminated in the M249
- 6.45×48mm XPL Swiss cartridge of the experimental W+F Bern C42 assault rifle used in the WEIZE (Weiche Ziele, lit. "soft target") program
- 6.5×39mm cartridge based on the 7.62×39mm of variants of the AR-15 and Zastava M70 assault rifles
- .280 British (7×43mm) cartridge of experimental weapons and the briefly in service EM-2 assault rifle
- 7.5×38mm Swiss trials Cartridge Stgw Patrone 47
- 7.5×38mm chambered for the CEAM Modèle 1950 rifle and experimental French variant of StG 45(M) rifle
- 7.65×33mm Argentine variant of German 7.92×33mm cartridge for use in Argentine copy of German Sturmgewehr 44 assault rifle
- 7.65×35mm chambered in CEAM Modèle 1950 and experimental French variant of the StG 45(M) rifle
- 7.75×39mm GeCo the first intermediate round ever made, German experiment
- 7.92×41mm chambered for the CETME rifle
- 6.02x41mm intended to replace both 7.62x39mm and 5.45x39mm in the Russian Armed Forces. Chambered for the AK-22 assault rifle and the Mini SVCh (SVCh sniper rifle variant)
- .264 LICC (6.5x43mm) developed by FN, the United States Army Marksmanship Unit (USAMU) and the Irregular Warfare Technical Support Directorate (IWTSD). Chambered for the FN IWS (Individual Weapon System) assault rifle and the FN EVOLYS light machine gun.

== See also ==
- List of assault rifles
- List of carbines
- List of rebated rim cartridges
- Table of handgun and rifle cartridges
- Fully powered cartridge
