= 6mm ARC =

American rifle cartridge by Hornady

6mm Advanced Rifle Cartridge
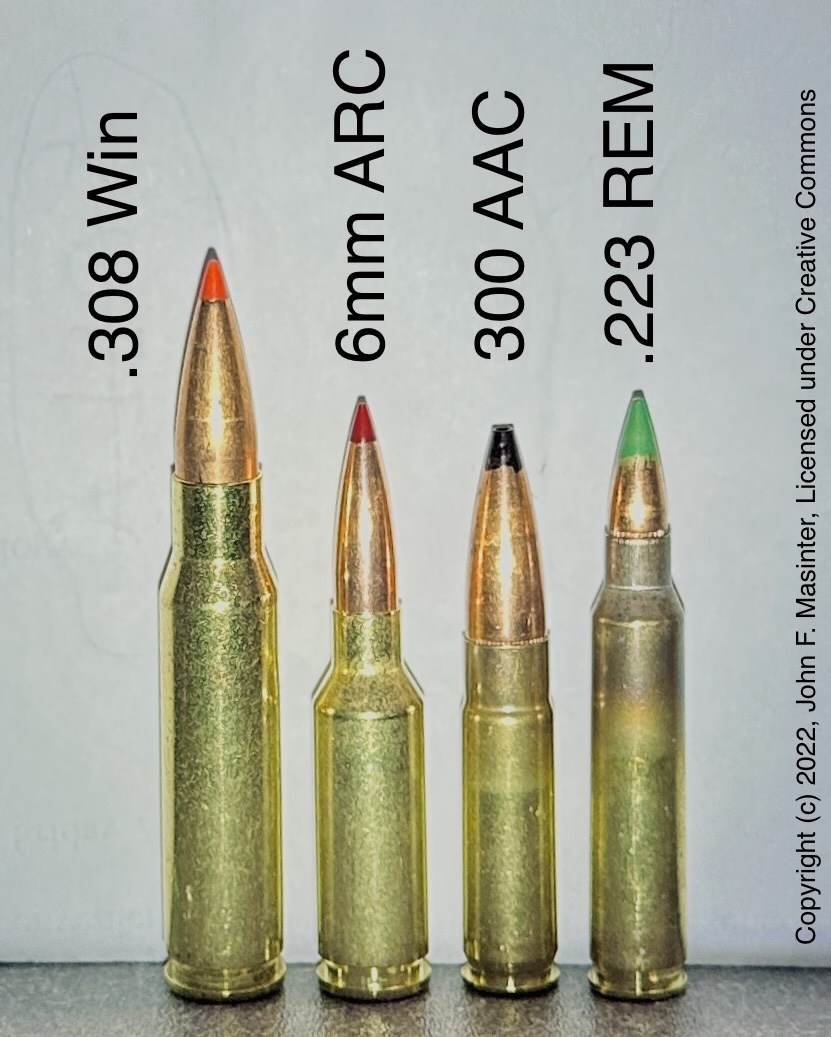
- Left to right; .308 Winchester, 6mm ARC, .300 AAC Blackout, .223 Remington
- Place of origin: United States

Production history
- Manufacturer: Hornady
- Produced: 2020–present

Specifications
- Parent case: .220 Russian/6.5mm Grendel
- Case type: Rimless, bottleneck
- Bullet diameter: 6.18 mm (0.243 in)
- Neck diameter: 6.96 mm (0.274 in)
- Shoulder diameter: 10.924 mm (0.4301 in)
- Base diameter: 11.201 mm (0.4410 in)
- Rim diameter: 11.20 mm (0.441 in)
- Rim thickness: 1.5 mm (0.059 in)
- Case length: 37.85 mm (1.490 in)
- Overall length: 57.40 mm (2.260 in)
- Case capacity: 2.20 cm^{3} (34.0 gr H_{2}O)
- Rifling twist: 190.5 mm (1:7.50 in)
- Primer type: Small rifle
- Maximum pressure (C.I.P.): 380.00 MPa (55,114 psi)
- Maximum pressure (SAAMI): 358.53 MPa (52,000 psi)

Ballistic performance
Bullet mass/type	Velocity	Energy
6.67 g (103 gr) ELD-X Precision Hunter	853.44 m/s (2,800.0 ft/s)	2,429 J (1,792 ft⋅lbf)
6.80 g (105 gr) BTHP BLACK	838.2 m/s (2,750 ft/s)	2,388 J (1,761 ft⋅lbf)
7.00 g (108 gr) ELD Match	838.2 m/s (2,750 ft/s)	2,459 J (1,814 ft⋅lbf)
- Test barrel length: 610 mm (24 in); Source

The 6mm Advanced Rifle Cartridge (6×38mm), or 6mm ARC for short, is a 6 mm (.243) caliber intermediate rifle cartridge introduced by Hornady in 2020, as a low-recoil, high-accuracy long-range cartridge, designed for use in the AR-15 rifle platforms at the request of a specialized group within the United States Department of Defense for its multipurpose combat rifle program. When compared to the military 5.56mm NATO platform, 6mm ARC is dimensionally incompatible regarding barrel, bolt and magazine components.

== Design and performance ==
The STANAG magazine-length cartridge was designed for and makes use of 6 mm (.243 in) very-low-drag bullets, which are known for their high ballistic coefficients due to the high sectional density with less drag and better energy retention at extended ranges. This promotes greater terminal characteristics at longer distances without having to shift to a larger, heavier rifle platform than the AR-15. With the release in 2020, Hornady also launched three factory loads with 103, 105 and 108 gr (6.7, 6.8 and 7.0 g) bullet weights and advertised G1 ballistic coefficients of .512, .530 and .536 respectively.

The 6mm ARC is a medium-power cartridge comparable to the 6.5mm Grendel, but with better ballistics thanks to the greater muzzle velocity achieved by using lighter 6 mm bullets and enough power to make use of the heavy 6 mm bullets. The ability to use a cartridge with this level of performance in an AR-15 platform and especially with high BC bullets within the constraint of magazine length limitations, make this cartridge an excellent choice for use in an AR-15.

=== SAAMI, C.I.P. and commercial data ===
In addition to the above comments, there is some confusion regarding the 6 mm ARC's performance. This is because loading data given in some manuals such as the 11th Edition Hornady Reloading Manual, for example, has two sets of data. The first set of data is loaded to the SAAMI maximum average pressure (MAP) of 52,000 psi (358.53 MPa), which is stated to be suitable for gas-operated firearms such as the AR-15 platform and its derivatives. The second set of data is loaded to a MAP of 62,000 psi (428.48 MPa), which is stated to be for use with bolt action guns such as the CZ 527. The Hornady manual states that this second set of data should not be used in gas-operated firearms. Due to the lower MAP, the performance of 6mm ARC ammunition loaded to 10,000 psi lower gas-gun pressures will, on average, be less than firearms loaded to bolt action pressures when using the same barrel length. When using shorter barrels, which are common on gas-guns, the difference will be even more pronounced. For example, the data in the Hornady 11th Edition Manual for an 18 in (457 mm)-barrelled AR-15 platform firearm was on average 200–300 ft/s (60–90 m/s) less than the data for the 24 in (610 mm)-barrelled CZ 527 bolt action rifle.

Reloading data publications from and commercially offered ammunition in C.I.P. member states must comply with C.I.P. procedures, rulings and legislation. According to the official C.I.P. rulings the 6mm ARC can handle up to 380.00 MPa (55,114 psi) P_{max} piezo pressure. In C.I.P. regulated countries every rifle cartridge combo has to be proofed at 125% of this maximum C.I.P. pressure to certify for sale to consumers. This means that 6mm ARC chambered arms in C.I.P. regulated countries are currently (2025) proof tested at 475.00 MPa (68,893 psi) PE piezo pressure. For small arms ammunition for use in "non-NATO Chamber" weapons, NATO has chosen to conform to the procedures as defined by the current C.I.P. legislation.

== Compatibility with the AR-15 ==
For an ordinary AR-15 rifle chambered for the .223 Remington/5.56mm NATO, a new barrel, magazine and bolt are required to convert to the 6mm ARC. The 6mm ARC utilizes the same bolt head size as the 6.5mm Grendel, and 6.5mm Grendel-compatible AR-pattern box magazines have also been used successfully with the 6mm ARC. The 6mm ARC therefore can also be a suitable chambering for shorter "mini-action" bolt-action rifles, such as the CZ 527 bolt action rifle.

== 6mm ARC as parent case ==
The relatively short, fat cartridge case is used as the parent case for other AR-15 compatible later cartridges, such as:

- .22 ARC (2024) — a necked down 5.56 mm (.223) variant designed for very-low-drag bullets
- .338 ARC (2025) — a necked up 8.6 mm (.338) (subsonic) variant

== See also ==
- .223 Remington
- 6mm AR
- 6 PPC
- 6.5mm Grendel
