= 4.32x45mm SBR =

Intermediate rifle cartridge

The 4.32x45mm SBR was an intermediate rifle cartridge used in the AAI Serial Bullet Rifle. It was designed for the United States Armed Forces' Future Rifle Program, which aimed to replace the Colt M16 rifles in service with the United States Armed Forces at that time. It remained at prototype stage. The conventional 4.32mm rounds were hoped to give better accuracy than AAI's earlier flechette cartridges while retaining their low recoil impulse.

== See also ==
- 4.85×49mm
