= Zastava M19 =

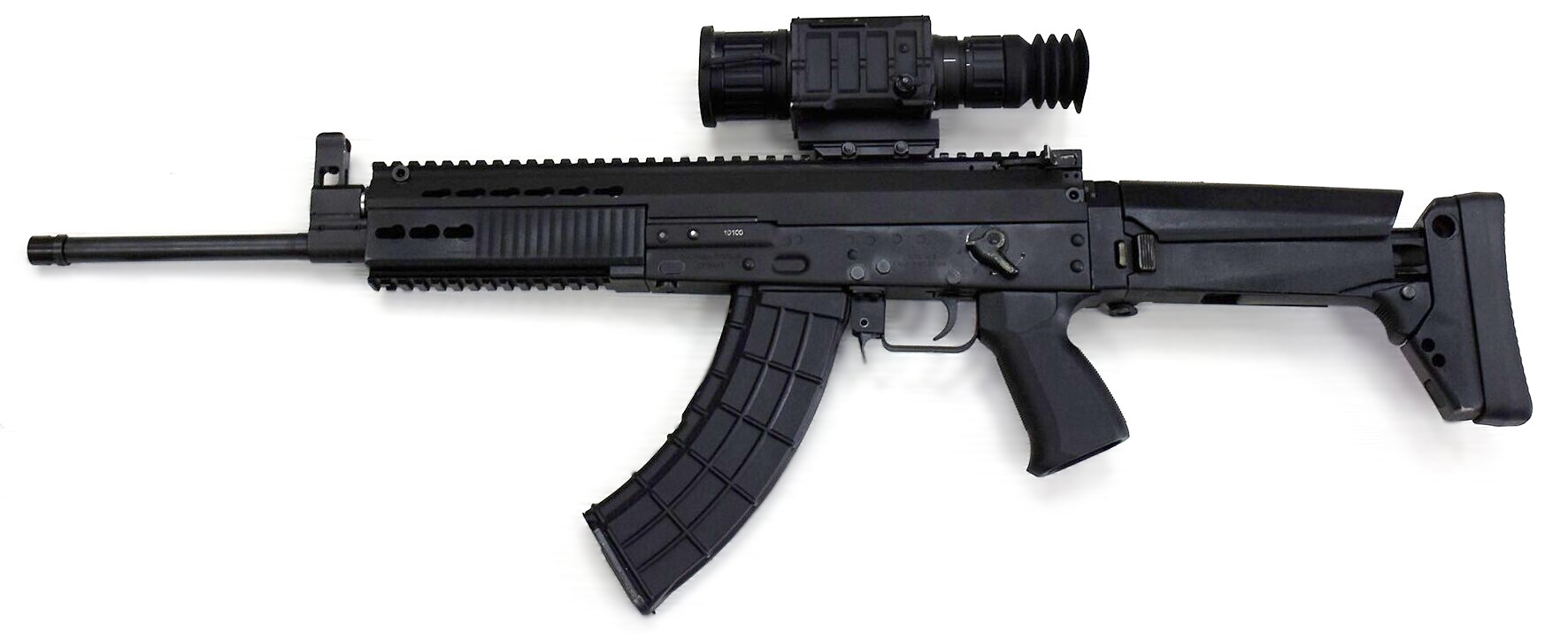
- Zastava M19
- Type: Assault rifle
- Place of origin: Serbia

Service history
- In service: 2022–present
- Used by: Serbian Armed Forces

Production history
- Designed: 2019
- Manufacturer: Zastava Arms

Specifications
- Mass: 3,85 kg (with 415 mm barrel)
- Length: 910 mm (with 415 mm barrel)
- Barrel length: 254 mm (10 in) or 415 mm (16.3 in)
- Cartridge: 6.5mm Grendel; 7.62x39mm
- Maximum firing range: 800 m
- Feed system: 20, 25, 30-round detachable box magazine
- Sights: Iron sights or various optical sights

Zastava M19 is a Serbian modular 6.5/7.62 mm assault rifle, designed and manufactured by the Zastava Arms as the standard service rifle of the Serbian Armed Forces.

== Design ==
The Zastava M19 rifle is based on the well-tested Kalashnikov principle, chambered in the 6.5 mm Grendel or 7.62×39 mm cartridge.

=== Sights ===
The M19 is equipped with complex aiming systems - day and reflex optical sight, as well as thermal sight, which significantly increases the efficiency of action at night. The temperature range functionality of the rifle is from -30°C to +50°C.

=== Operation ===
The M19 is gas operated with a rotating bolt locking system. The reliability of functioning in different climatic and field conditions has been confirmed by strict testing methods in accordance with military standards.

=== Modularity ===
The M19 is a modular rifle, depending on the task and mission, can use 7.62 mm or 6.5 mm barrels. The modification is reflected in the construction of the cross latch on the receiver, which enables easy and quick replacement of the barrel, without disassembling the rifle and without using tools.

In addition to barrels in different calibers, within a single caliber there are different barrel lengths (254 mm and 415 mm), which allows the rifle to quickly adapt to a variety of combat situations, so that basically the same rifle can be used as a carbine, assault rifle, light machine gun or designated marksman rifle.

Changing the caliber of the rifle also requires changing the magazine, and the magazine are clearly marked and noticeably different. Magazine capacity for caliber 7.62×39 mm is 30 rounds and for caliber 6.5 mm magazine capacity can be 25 and 20 rounds.

=== Ergonomics ===
In line with modern assault rifle trends, the M19 has an integrated top cover and gas chamber upper lining with a long "Picatinny" rail that accepts all types of optoelectronic sights, as well as a shutter-release handle that allows rehearsal with both left and right hands and a fire control on the left side of the handle suitable for handling.

The folding-telescopic buttstock has an adjustable cheek rest, the rear handle is ergonomically improved and with the front handle it allows a firmer and more stable grip, especially during burst firing. The frame holder button has been expanded to make it easier to remove and replace the frame.

== Users ==
- Serbia - Serbian Armed Forces

== Gallery ==
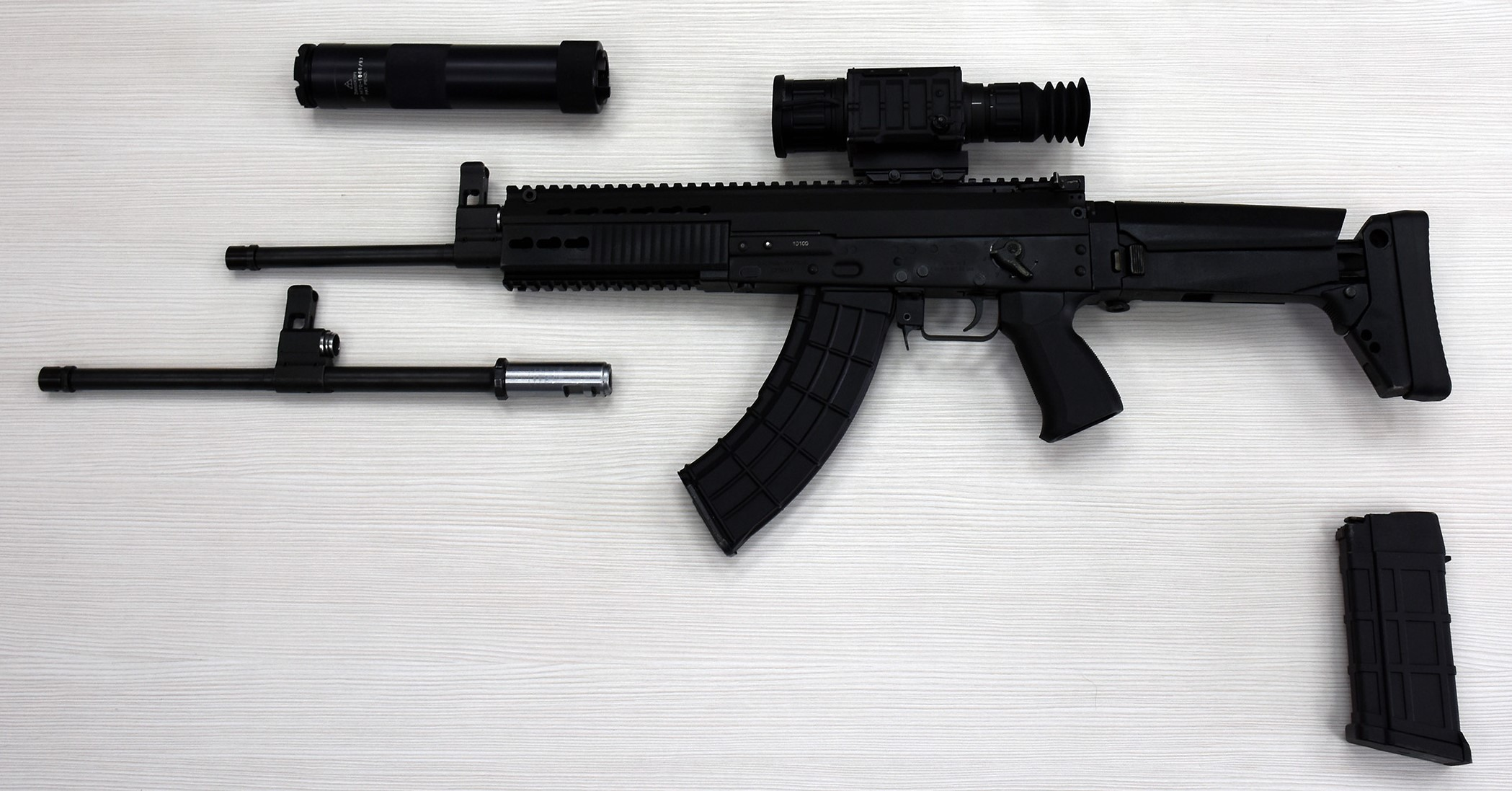
Zastava M19 package

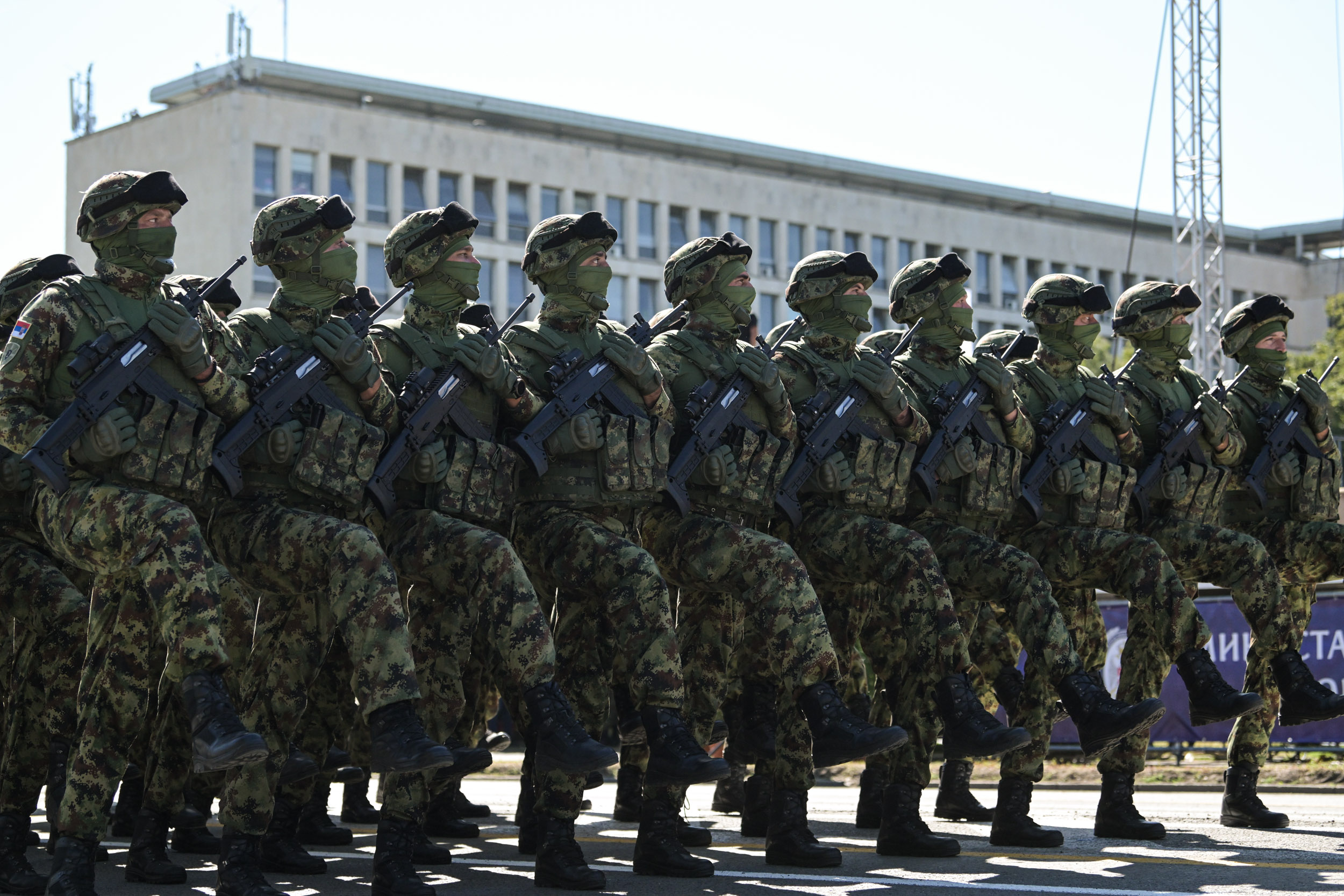
Serbian Army personnels with Zastava M19

Serbian Army members holding their 6.5mm version of Zastava M19
