= 6.45×48mm XPL Swiss =

Swiss experimental rifle cartridge

6.45x48mm XPL Swiss
- Type: Rifle
- Place of origin: Switzerland

Production history
- Designer: Swiss Army
- Designed: 1979-1980

Specifications
- Parent case: 7.62×51mm NATO
- Case type: Rimless, bottleneck
- Bullet diameter: 6.65 mm (0.262 in)
- Neck diameter: 7.56 mm (0.298 in)
- Shoulder diameter: 10.95 mm (0.431 in)
- Base diameter: 11.82 mm (0.465 in)
- Rim diameter: 11.81 mm (0.465 in)
- Rim thickness: 1.55 mm (0.061 in)
- Case length: 47.72 mm (1.879 in)
- Overall length: 65.06 mm (2.561 in)

Ballistic performance
Bullet mass/type	Velocity	Energy
6.3 g (97 gr)	900 m/s (3,000 ft/s)	2,550 J (1,880 ft⋅lbf)
- Source: quarryhs.co.uk

6.45×48mm XPL Swiss (or 6.45×48 GP 80) is an experimental intermediate rifle cartridge.

== Development ==
It was developed as part of the WEIZE trials (Weiche Ziele, lit. "soft target") in conjunction with the SIG SG 550 rifle, as a potential successor to the 7.5×55mm Schmidt–Rubin cartridge.

== Description ==
The rimless cartridge has a base diameter of 11.82 mm (similar to the 7.62×51mm NATO) and a case length of 47.72 mm.

The bullet is an unusual 6.65 mm diameter (6.45mm refers to the bore diameter), fractionally smaller than the common 6.5 mm (bore diameter) bullet.

The 97 gr (6.3 g) bullet was fired at a muzzle velocity of 900 m/s (3,000 ft/s) with 2,550 J (1,880 ft⋅lb) of muzzle energy.

== Production ==
The cartridge was not adopted, the SIG SG-550 went into production with the 5.6×45mm GP 90 round.

Weapons using the 6.45mm cartridge
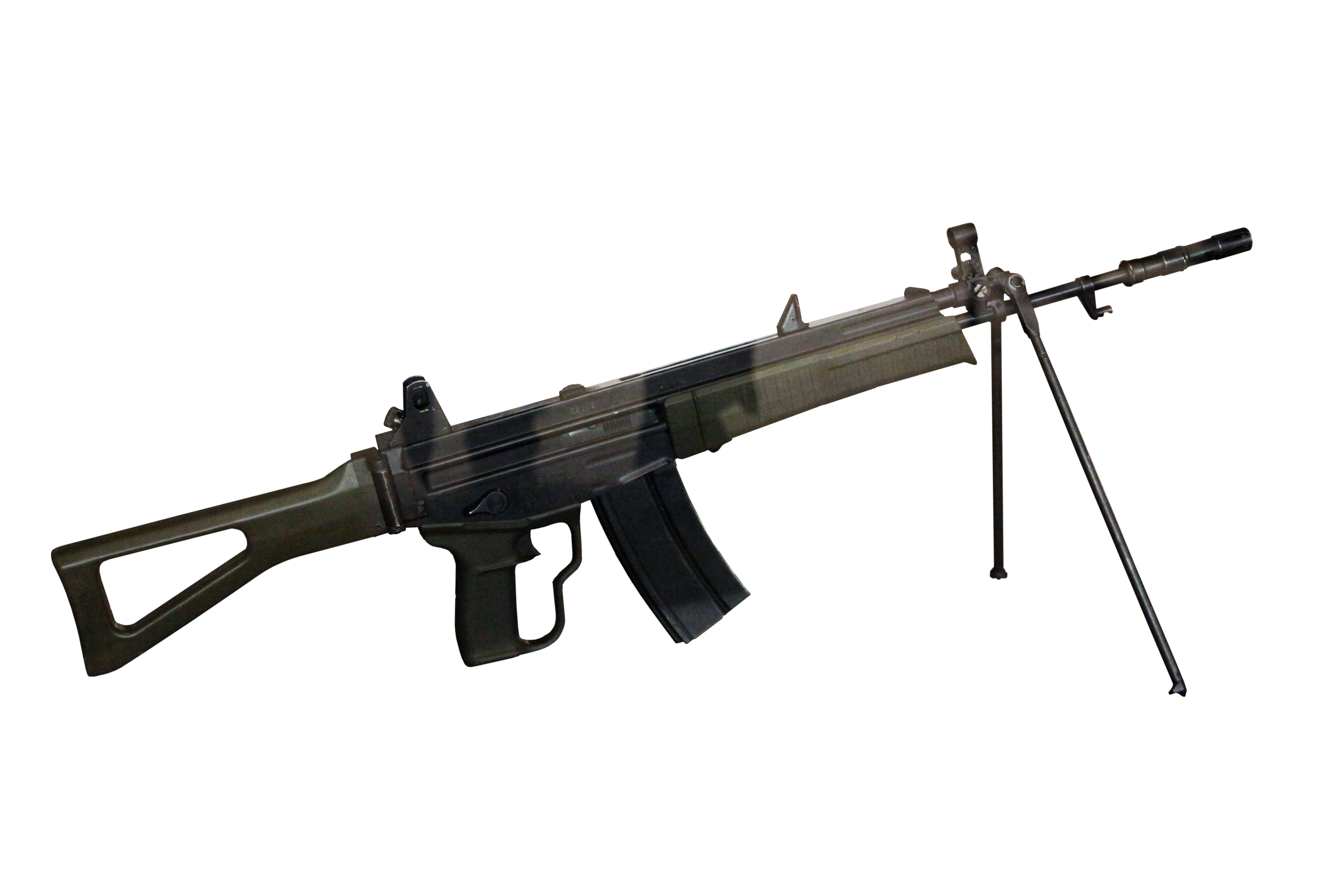
The C42 by Waffenfabrik Bern (Rifle version)

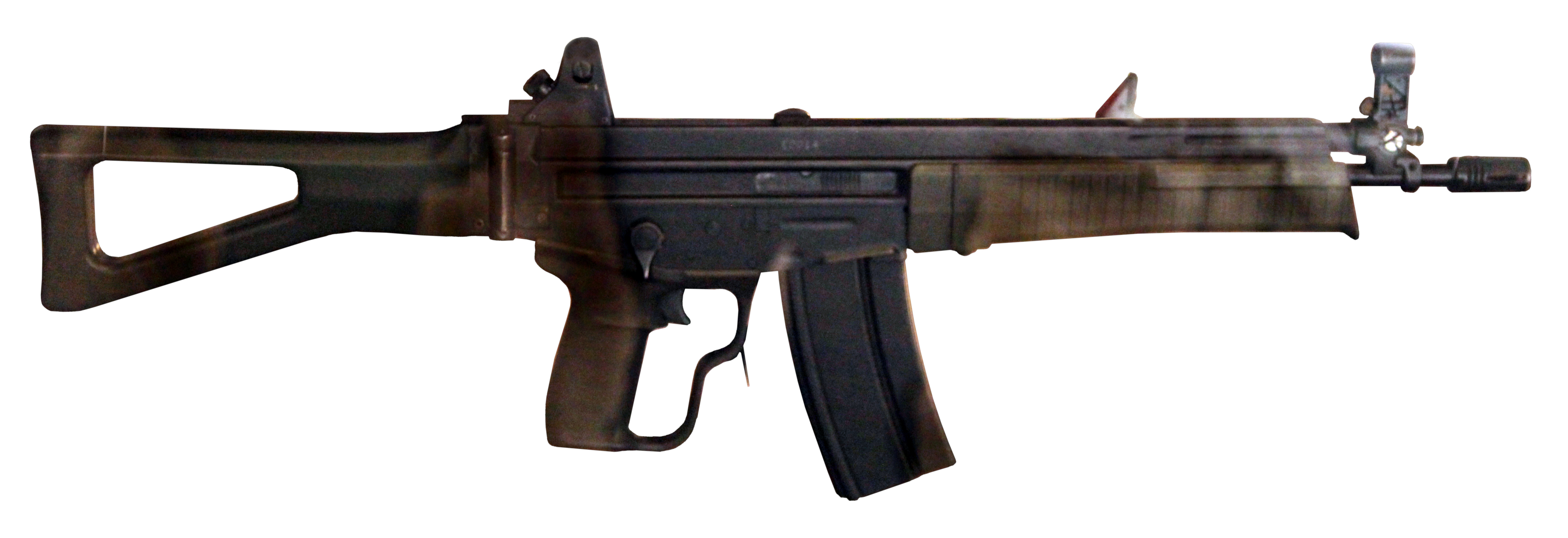
The C42 by Waffenfabrik Bern (Carbine version)

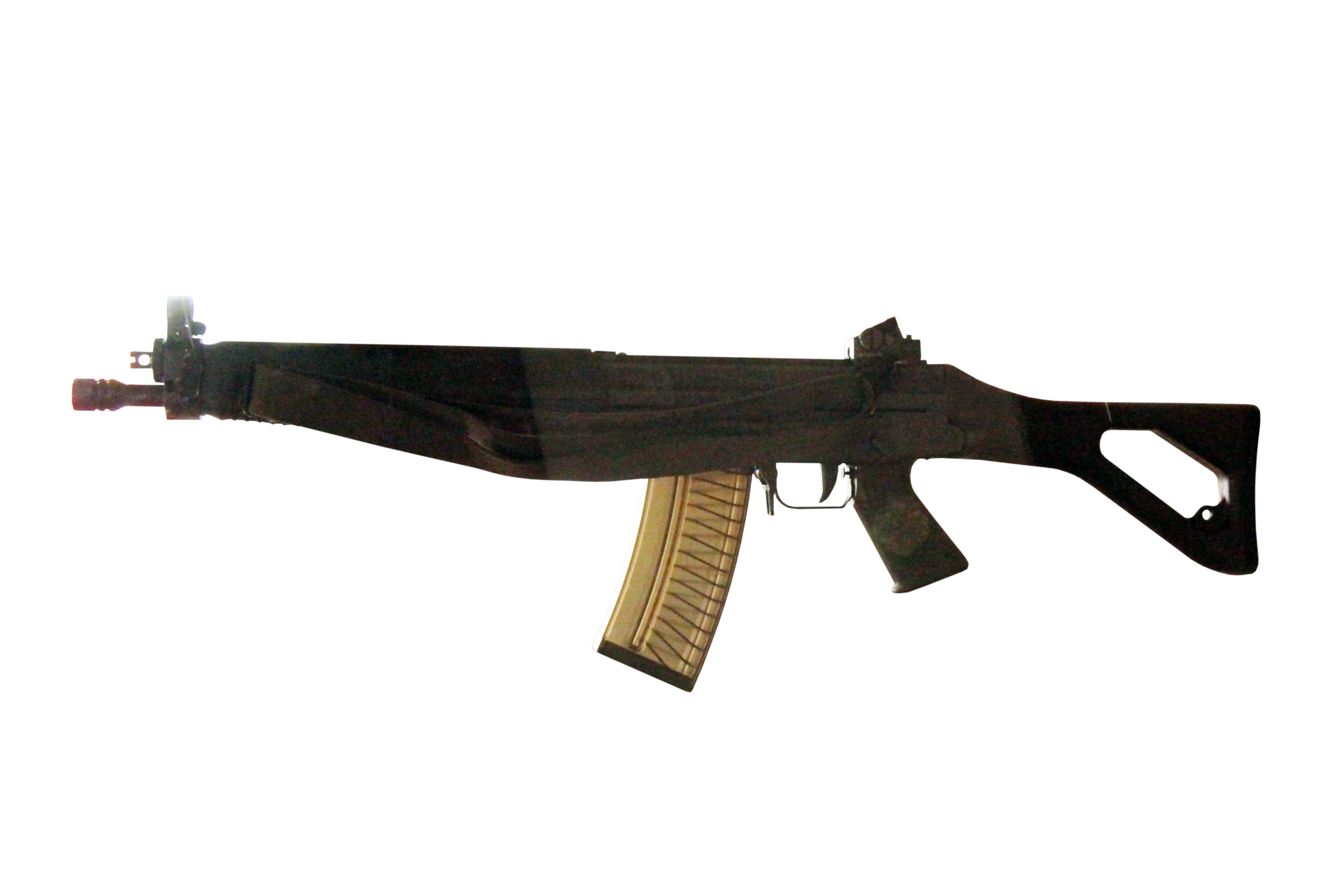
The SIG 541 (Carbine version)
