= 6.5mm Grendel =

Rifle cartridge

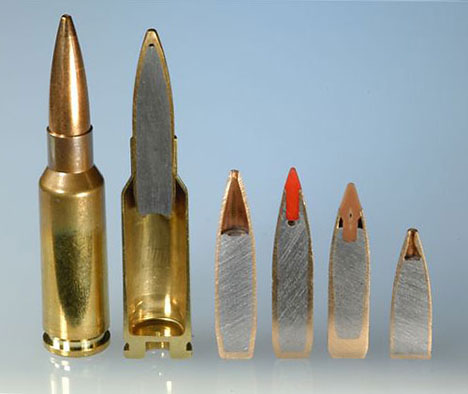
- 6.5mm Grendel showing variety of bullets—144 gr (9.3 g) to 90 gr (5.8 g)
- Type: Rifle
- Place of origin: United States

Production history
- Designer: Bill Alexander and Janne Pohjoispää
- Designed: 2003

Specifications
- Parent case: .220 Russian (5.6×39mm)
- Case type: Rimless, bottleneck
- Bullet diameter: 6.71 mm (0.264 in)
- Land diameter: 6.50 mm (0.256 in)
- Neck diameter: 7.44 mm (0.293 in)
- Shoulder diameter: 10.87 mm (0.428 in)
- Base diameter: 11.15 mm (0.439 in)
- Rim diameter: 11.2 mm (0.44 in)
- Rim thickness: 1.5 mm (0.059 in)
- Case length: 38.7 mm (1.52 in)
- Overall length: 57.5 mm (2.26 in)
- Case capacity: 2.3 cm^{3} (35 gr H_{2}O)
- Rifling twist: 1 in 200 mm (8 in) or 1 in 230 mm (9 in)
- Primer type: Small rifle
- Maximum pressure: 360 MPa (52,000 psi)

Ballistic performance
Bullet mass/type	Velocity	Energy
90 gr (6 g) Speer TNT	2,880 ft/s (880 m/s)	1,658 ft⋅lbf (2,248 J)
108 gr (7 g) Scenar (moly)	2,790 ft/s (850 m/s)	1,866 ft⋅lbf (2,530 J)
120 gr (8 g) Norma FMJBT	2,700 ft/s (820 m/s)	1,942 ft⋅lbf (2,633 J)
123 gr (8 g) Sierra Matchking	2,650 ft/s (810 m/s)	1,917 ft⋅lbf (2,599 J)
130 gr (8 g) Norma	2,510 ft/s (770 m/s)	1,818 ft⋅lbf (2,465 J)
- Test barrel length: 24 inches (610 mm); Source: Alexander Arms Pressure-safe Load Data

The 6.5mm Grendel (6.5×39mm) is an intermediate cartridge jointly designed by British-American armorer Bill Alexander, competitive shooter Arne Brennan (of Houston, Texas) and Lapua ballistician Janne Pohjoispää, as a low-recoil, high-precision rifle cartridge specifically for the AR-15 platform at medium/long range (200–800 yard). It is an improved variation of the 6.5mm PPC.

The 6.5mm Grendel cartridge was first unveiled in May 2003 at the Blackwater Training Facility in North Carolina, where it remained supersonic at 1,200 yd (1,100 m) range and out-shot the 7.62mm NATO with only half the recoil. Since its introduction, it has proven to be a versatile cartridge and is now expanding into other firearm design platforms including bolt-action rifles and the Kalashnikov system.

The name "Grendel" is inspired by the mythical monster antagonist from the Old English epic poem Beowulf. It was a trademark owned by Alexander Arms (Bill Alexander's company in Radford, Virginia) and manufactured at Radford Arsenal, until legally released in 2010 for SAAMI standardization with collaboration from Hornady.

== Development and history ==
The goal of the 6.5mm Grendel design was to create an effective STANAG magazine-length cartridge for the AR-15 platform that could reach 200–800 yd (180–730 m) and surpass the performance of the native 5.56mm NATO/.223 Remington cartridge. Constrained by the dimension of the STANAG magazines, the Grendel's designers decided to use a shorter, larger-diameter case for higher powder volume while allowing space for the long, streamlined, high ballistic coefficient 6.5mm (.264 cal.) bullets. Firing factory-loaded ammunition with bullets ranging from 90 to 129 grains (5.8 to 8.4 g), its muzzle velocity varies from 2,500 ft/s (760 m/s) with 129- and 130-grain (8.4 g) bullets to 2,900 ft/s (880 m/s) with 90 gr (5.8 g) bullets (similar in velocity to a 77-grain (5.0 g) 5.56 mm round). Depending on their case material and bullet weight, 6.5mm Grendel cartridges weigh 14.7 to 17.8 grams (227 to 275 gr). That is significantly more when compared to 8 to 12 grams (120 to 190 gr) 5.56mm NATO rounds.

The case head diameter of the Grendel is the same as that of the 5.6×39mm (.220 Russian), 7.62×39mm and 6.5mm PPC cases. This diameter is larger than the 5.56×45mm NATO, thereby necessitating the use of a non-standard AR-15 bolt. The increased case diameter results in a small reduction in the magazine ammo capacities. A 6.5mm Grendel magazine with the same dimensions as a 30-round STANAG magazine will hold 26 rounds of Grendel ammunition.

== Performance ==
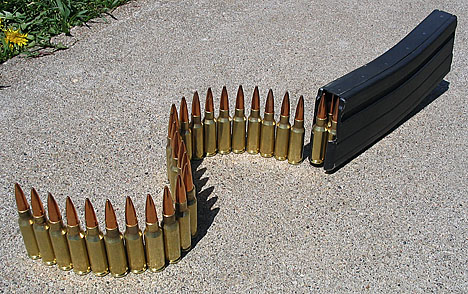
C-Products 26-round Grendel Magazine

Proponents assert that the Grendel is a good "middle ground" between the 5.56×45mm NATO and the 7.62×51mm NATO. It retains greater terminal energy at extended ranges than either of these cartridges due to its higher ballistic coefficient (BC). For example, the 123 gr (8.0 g) 6.5 mm Grendel bullet has more kinetic energy and better body armor penetration at 1,000 m (1,100 yd) than the larger and heavier 147 gr (9.5 g) bullet of the M80 7.62mm NATO round.

In order to obtain ballistics that are superior to the 7.62×51mm cartridge, a weapon with a longer barrel and firing a heavier bullet is necessary. To achieve the same results from shorter-length barrels, even heavier bullets are needed.

=== External ballistics ===
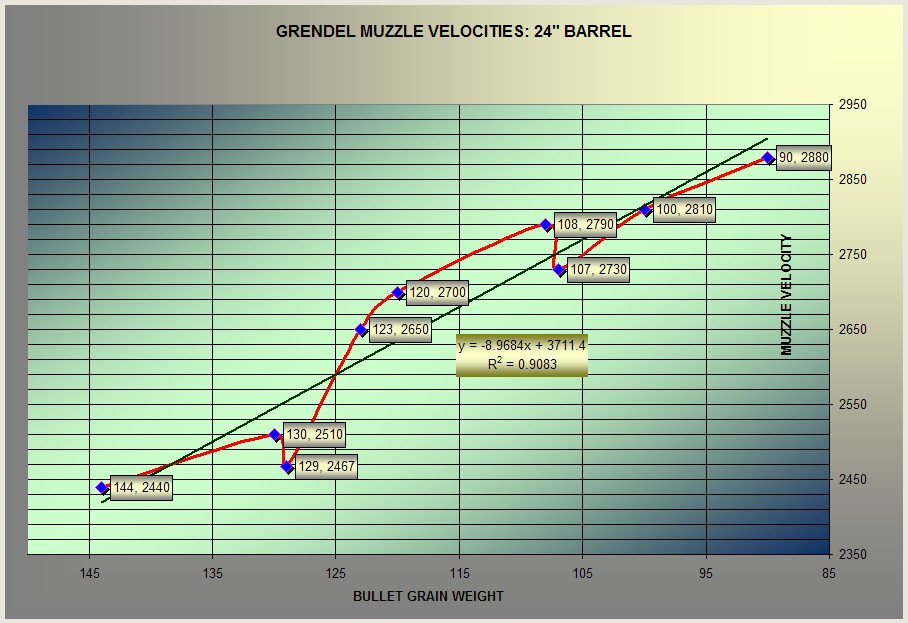
Muzzle Velocity Change with Bullet Weight

Bullet velocity: 24 inch (609.6 mm) barrel
	Bullet mass		Muzzle velocity		1,000 meter velocity	
	gr	g	ft/s	m/s	ft/s	m/s
Lapua Scenar	108	7.0	2,700	820	1,166	355
Lapua Scenar	123	8.0	2,620	800	1,222	372
Lapua FMJBT	144	9.3	2,450	750	1,213	370

As noted above, the Grendel case is very closely related to the .220 Russian case. In general, each additional grain of bullet weight will reduce muzzle velocity by 10.8 ft/s (50.8 m/s for each gram) and each additional inch of barrel length will increase muzzle velocity by 20 ft/s (2.4 m/s for each centimeter). Specific details are available as graphs derived from Alexander Arms' public domain load table linked below.

== LE and Military usage ==
Serbia has adopted two rifles made by Zastava Arms in 6.5 mm Grendel caliber as main armament for its armed forces. The two rifles, designated Zastava M19 (officially adopted by the Serbian Armed Forces in 2022) and Zastava M20 (a compact carbine variant of the M19), are derivatives of the previous-issue M70 rifle. Serbia is also currently testing a light machine gun chambered in 6.5 Grendel based on their current Zastava M84 general purpose machine gun which is chambered in 7.62×54mmR. An American-manufactured rifle in 6.5mm Grendel caliber may also be adopted in armament for special forces units after it passes testing in Technical Testing Center. Three types of 6.5mm Grendel ammunition produced by Prvi Partizan of Užice, Serbia, will be tested for use with these rifles. The French police tactical unit GIGN announced in 2025 that they are partnering with Swiss ammunition maker SwissP Defenc to produce 6.5 Grendel cartridges for the GIGN.

== See also ==
- .220 Russian (5.6×39 mm)
- .224 Valkyrie (5.6×41 mm)
- 6mm PPC
- 6mm AR, a 6 mm wildcat version which shares 6.5 Grendel's casing, but sends a (usually) lighter projectile up to 1,000 yards (900 m).
- 6mm ARC, a factory cartridge with many similarities to the 6mm AR
- 6.5×55mm Swedish
- 6.5mm Creedmoor
- 6.5×42mm, also known as 6.5 MPC (Multi Purpose Cartridge), based on a necked up .223 Remington case.
- 6.8mm Remington SPC
- 7.62×37mm Musang
- 7.62×39mm
- List of AR platform cartridges
- List of rifle cartridges
- Table of handgun and rifle cartridges

== Bibliography ==
- Guns 'n' Ammo: Book of the AR-15, 2004, "The 6.5mm Grendel", David Fortier, p. 66.
- Special Weapons for Military & Police, Annual #27 2004, "Beyond the 5.56mm NATO", Stan Crist, pp. 62–67.
- Guns 'n' Ammo: Book of the AR-15, 2005, "6.5mm Grendel and 6.8 SPC", David Fortier, pp. 32–44.
- Shooting Times, February 2005, "Cooking up Loads for the 6.5mm Grendel", David Fortier, pp. 52–56.
- Shooting Illustrated, September 2005, "6.5mm Grendel and Alexander Arms", J. Guthrie, pp. 34–37, 67–69.
- Petersen's: Rifle Shooter, March/April 2006, "Cartridge Efficiency—Why case shape matters", M. L. McPherson, pp. 22–24.
- Shooting Times, January 2007, "Other AR Chamberings", Sidebar Article, David Fortier, p. 56.
- Special Weapons, Semi-Annual #50 2007, "The Super Versatile AR", Charlie Cutshaw, pp. 44–45, 80–83.
- Special Weapons, Semi-Annual #50 2007, "5.56mm NATO Alternatives", Stan Crist, pp. 52–59.
- Shooting Times, March 2007, "Les Baer's 6.5mm Grendel AR Sets a New Standard", David Fortier, pp. 26–32.
- Special Weapons for Military & Police #52, Spring 2007, "BETTER-IDEA 6.5mm GRENDEL", Stan Crist
- Special Weapons for Military & Police #52, Spring 2007, "New Battlefield Requirements—New Rifles and Ammo Needed", Charlie Cutshaw
