= MBO-1 =

Soviet bolt-action target rifle

- Type: bolt-action rifle
- Place of origin: USSR

Production history
- Designer: A. E. Ozerov
- Manufacturer: Izhevsk Machine-Building Plant
- Produced: 1964–1972

Specifications
- Mass: 4.3 – 5.0 kg
- Length: 1156 – 1176mm
- Barrel length: 560 – 730mm
- Cartridge: 5.6×39mm
- Rate of fire: variable
- Feed system: 3-round magazine, loaded individually
- Sights: diopter sight

The MBO-1 (МБО-1) is a Soviet bolt-action target rifle for competitive shooting sports (100 meter running deer exercise and Olympic games).

== Design ==
The MBO-1 has heavy barrel with six grooves (420 mm twist rate) and non-detachable internal box magazine.

All rifles had a wooden stock and fore-end.

== Variants ==
- MBO-1 (МБО-1) - first model, 4.3 kg, 730 mm barrel, diopter sight
- MBO-1M (МБО-1М) - second model, 5.0 kg, 680 mm barrel
- MBO-1K (МБО-1К)
- MBO-2 (МБО-2) - last model, 5.0 kg, 560 mm barrel, with muzzle brake and optical sight

== Users ==
- Soviet Union
- Moldova - is allowed as target rifle
- Ukraine: at least until February 2012 ex-Soviet target rifles were stored in the warehouses of the Ministry of Defense of Ukraine

== Sources ==
- Спортивная винтовка МБО-1 // Спортивно-охотничье оружие и патроны. Бухарест, "Внешторгиздат", 1965. стр.99
- Сергей Юрчук, Михаил Коноплев. МБО-1. Произвольная винтовка для стрельбы по мишени Бегущий олень // журнал "Оружие и охота", № 5, 2011
