= 4.85×49mm =

Firearm intermediate cartridge

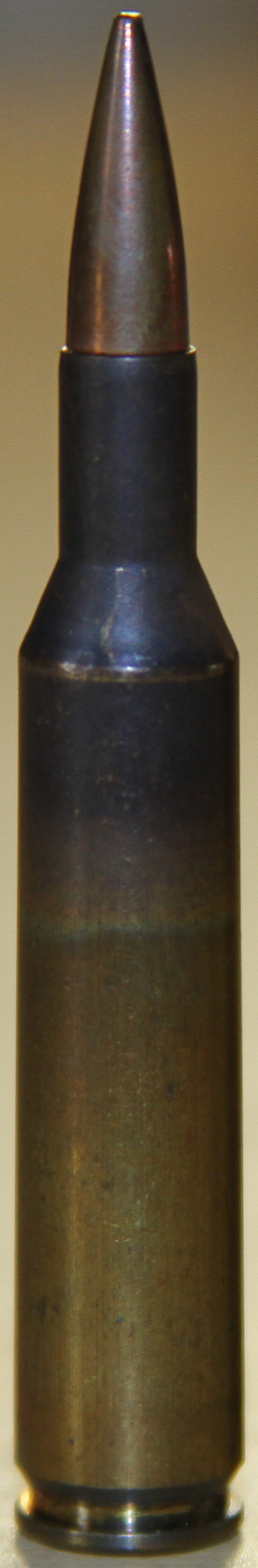
- Type: Rifle
- Place of origin: United Kingdom

Production history
- Designer: Royal Small Arms Factory

Specifications
- Parent case: 5.56×45mm NATO
- Case type: Rimless, bottleneck
- Bullet diameter: .197 in (5.0 mm)
- Neck diameter: .220 in (5.6 mm)
- Shoulder diameter: .353 in (9.0 mm)
- Base diameter: .375 in (9.5 mm)
- Rim diameter: .376 in (9.6 mm)
- Rim thickness: .041 in (1.0 mm)
- Case length: 1.925 in (48.9 mm)
- Overall length: 2.455 in (62.4 mm)
- Primer type: Small rifle
- Maximum pressure: 52,000 psi (360 MPa)

Ballistic performance
Bullet mass/type	Velocity	Energy
55 gr (4 g) FMJ	949.5 m/s (3,115 ft/s)	1,190 J (880 ft⋅lbf)
- Test barrel length: N/A; Source: Ammo Encyclopedia

The 4.85×49mm is an experimental intermediate firearm cartridge made by the United Kingdom for the Individual Weapon Project, which became the SA80 series of small arms.

== Design ==
The 4.85×49mm cartridge is based on the 5.56×45mm NATO, but uses a 5 mm bullet and has a longer neck than the 5.56mm does. Muzzle velocity is better than the M193 5.56mm loading, which this cartridge was designed to compete against. The 4.85×49mm bullet weighs 55 grains (3.6 g).

== History ==
During the 1960s, the United Kingdom experimented with creating a lightweight but effective replacement for the 7.62×51mm NATO round. Their original experiments focused on a .280 British (a British 1950 intermediate cartridge) round necked down to 7.2 mm. However, in the 1960s, a West German study proposed that an ideal cartridge would have a 5 mm or smaller calibre. The results of this study encouraged the UK to research and develop bullets that were 5 mm, and smaller calibres, for their experimental cartridge. This resulted in an official decision that the round for the rifle that would become the SA80 was to be 5 mm, or slightly smaller.

The cases of these experimental 5 mm rounds were reformed 5.56 mm NATO cases, although the shape of the bullet was a scaled-down version of an earlier experimental round, measuring 6.23×43 mm. A round measuring 5×44 mm at the neck, made in 1970, was effectively the prototype of the round eventually adopted, although under the name 4.85×49 mm. The diameter of the round did not change. It was decided to rename it "4.85 mm", to match the diameter of the barrel's lands, rather than the diameter of the bullet neck.

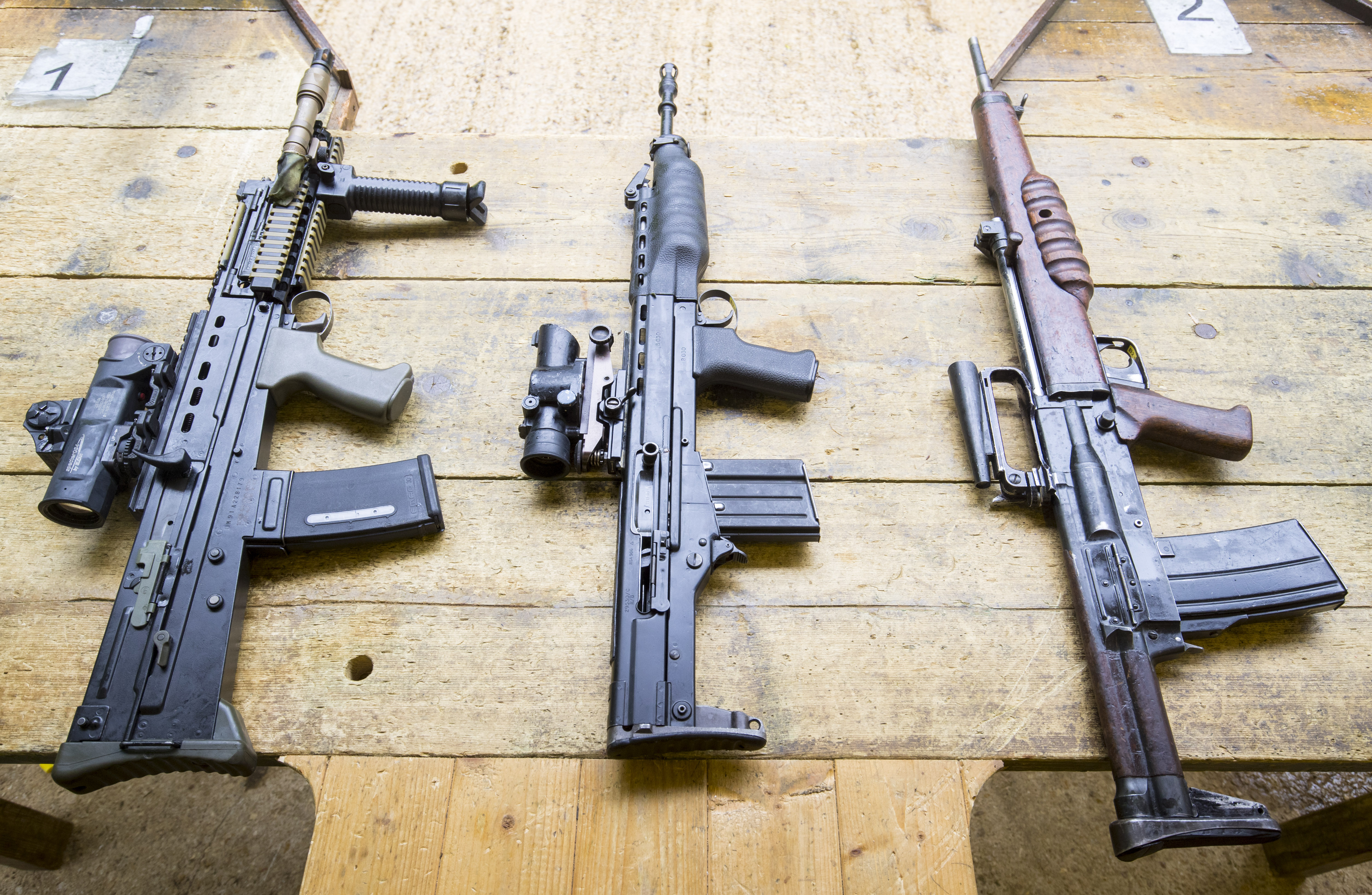
Left to right are the SA80-A2 5.56×45mm NATO, experimental XL 60 4.85×49mm and EM-2 .280 British assault rifles

Continued tests showed that there were problems with bullet seating. To fix this, the round's neck was elongated 5 mm to create a 4.85×49mm round. However, before the production lines were fully retooled for the new round, RSAF Enfield required a batch of ammo for testing. Existing 4.85×44mm rounds had their necks manually stretched out 5 mm in order to qualify for the test.

Tests with both the 4.85×49mm round and the L64/65 continued throughout the 1970s. In 1976, the L64/L65 weapon system was officially announced. In 1977, trials to find a new cartridge and weapon for NATO standardisation were underway. The United Kingdom submitted the IW weapon a 4.85×49mm. Lots of both the XL1E1 ball and XL2E1 tracer round were created in order to provide enough ammunition for the tests. The UK hoped that the United States and NATO would see the inherent advantages the 4.85×49mm round had over the 5.56×45mm NATO round and adopt it.

The 4.85mm's lifespan came to an end when the ending results of the NATO tests concluded that the FN Herstal SS109 bullet for the 5.56mm had the best performance. In 1979, British testers formally scrapped the 4.85 mm round in favour of the 5.56 mm round. The IW system was subsequently rechambered to 5.56 mm.

No other countries have used the 4.85 mm round.

== Variants ==
Several variants of the 4.85 mm round were made over its lifetime.

=== Ball ===
The most common type of 4.85 mm round is the XL1E1 ball, which was used in NATO trials. This round has a 55.3-grain bullet that has a muzzle velocity of 3,115 ft/s and a muzzle energy of 1,210 ft/lbf.

=== Tracer ===
Several tracer types were made for the 4.85mm, but the most common one is the XL2E1, which was used in NATO trials. It has an orange tipped head. Up to ten other variants were produced, but never made it into full production.

=== Short Range ===
A 4.85 mm variant designed for short range used the same case that the standard round used, but fired a round and white plastic bullet.

=== Dummy ===
Several dummies were produced for the 4.85mm during its lifetime. Early dummies were simply a blank 4.85×44mm round with a 5 mm longer neck, but later models include a round with three holes drilled in its base, and a chrome-plated case that has several vertical flutes on it.

A special plastic training dummy version of the 4.85mm was also made. it consisted of a sawed-off 4.85mm cartridge with a blue plastic head on it. When the gun is fired, the plastic head flies off.

=== Blanks ===
Early blanks were made out of, but later ones used a standard-shaped cartridge with a rosecrimp blank shape where the head would be. The rosecrimp blank was also used for blanks used to fire rifle grenades.

=== Armour piercing ===
Armour-piercing rounds were developed for both the 4.85×44mm and 4.85×49mm rounds, but never went into large-scale production, like the ball and tracer variants had. The AP rounds have a black band just under the bullet tip.

== Gallery ==
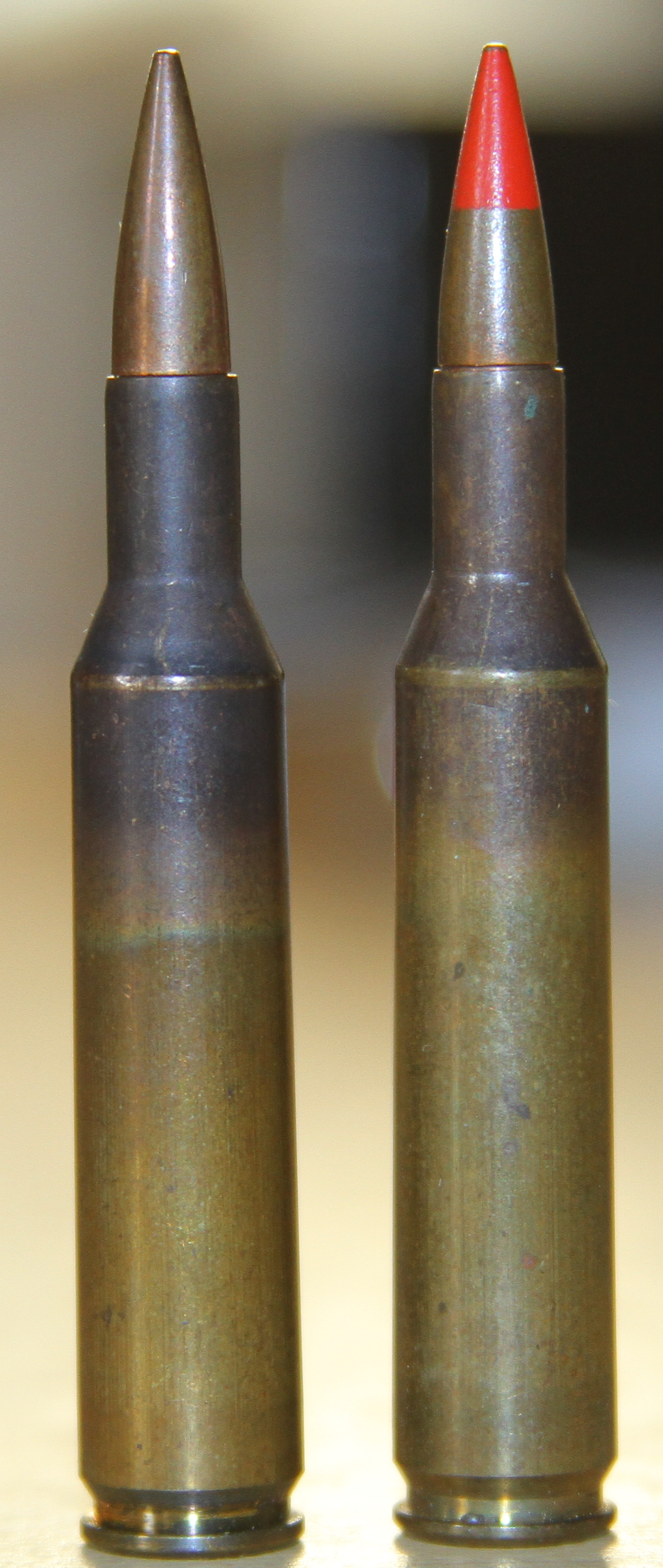
Xl1E1 ball cartridge on left and XL2E1 tracer round on the right

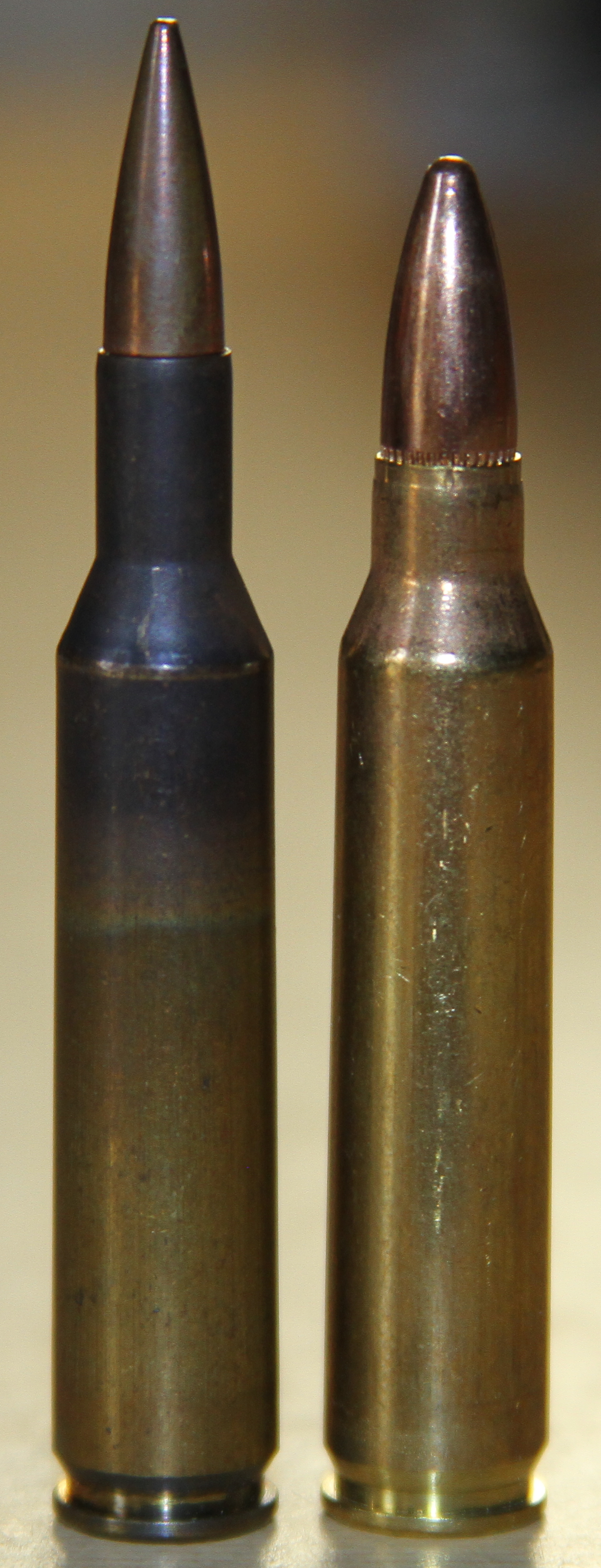
XL1E1 cartridge on the left and a .223 Remington cartridge on the right
