= 6mm PPC =

Rifle cartridge

6x38mm PPC
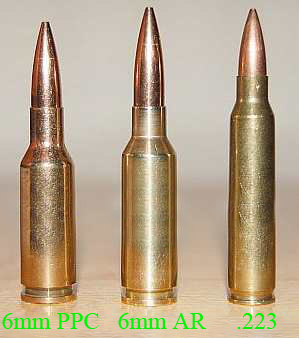
- Left to right: 6mm PPC, 6mm AR and .223 Remington cartridges
- Type: Rifle / Competition
- Place of origin: USA

Production history
- Designer: Lou Palmisano / Ferris Pindell
- Designed: 1975

Specifications
- Parent case: .220 Russian (5.6×39mm)
- Case type: Rimless, bottleneck
- Bullet diameter: .2430 in (6.17 mm)
- Neck diameter: .262 in (6.7 mm)
- Shoulder diameter: .431 in (10.9 mm)
- Base diameter: .441 in (11.2 mm)
- Rim diameter: .445 in (11.3 mm)
- Case length: 1.515 in (38.5 mm)
- Overall length: 2.100 in (53.3 mm)
- Rifling twist: 1-14"
- Primer type: Small rifle

Ballistic performance
Bullet mass/type	Velocity	Energy
60 gr (4 g) HP	3,300 ft/s (1,000 m/s)	1,452 ft⋅lbf (1,969 J)
70 gr (5 g) SX	3,250 ft/s (990 m/s)	1,641 ft⋅lbf (2,225 J)
- Test barrel length: 24"; Source(s): Accurate Powder

The 6mm PPC (Palmisano & Pindel Cartridge), or 6x38 PPC as it is more often called, is a centerfire rifle cartridge used almost exclusively for benchrest shooting. It is one of the most accurate cartridges available at distances of up to 300 meters. This cartridge's accuracy is produced by a combination of its posture, being only 31 mm (1.22 in) long, and shoulder angle of 30 degrees. Its primary use has been benchrest shooting matches since the 1980s.

== Background ==
The cartridge is a necked-up version of the .22 PPC which is in turn based on a .220 Russian (5.6×39mm). The standard bullet diameter for 6 mm caliber cartridges is .243 inches (6.2 mm), the same diameter used in the .243 Winchester and 6mm Remington cartridges. To obtain maximum accuracy, bullet weight and form are matched to the rifling twist rate of the barrel. Typically, 68 gr (4.41 g) bullets are used in barrels with twist rates of 1 in 13 inch (1 in 330 mm), while 1 in 15 inch (1 in 380 mm) barrel twists can accommodate lighter 58 or 60 gr (3.76 or 3.89 g) accurately. The cartridge developed enough acceptance that rifles chambered for it are available commercially.

== Converting cases ==
The parent cartridge for the 6PPC is the .220 Russian (5.6×39mm), which in turn derives from the 7.62×39mm. Brass can either be purchased or formed from .220 Russian brass. Recently, European cartridge manufacturers Lapua, Norma and SAKO have begun making 6mm PPC brass.

During its early development, accuracy experts noted that perfectly concentric thicknesses of the cartridge neck were beneficial in aligning the bullet with the bore. Most 6PPC chamber reamers are ground with a tight neck section to create a cartridge with a concentric fit and consistent neck-to-chamber clearance. This contributes to the 6PPC's accuracy.

To convert an existing .220 Russian case, the case first is lubricated and sized in a 6PPC die. A pistol primer is then inserted into the case and the case is filled with fast-burning pistol propellant. Paraffin wax is then melted into the lid of a jar and pressed it over the neck of the cartridge to seal it. At this point, the case has been made into a blank cartridge. The case is fire formed in a 6mm PPC rifle, expanding the case powder capacity. The fire formed case is cleaned to remove lubricant and powder residue. The neck is then expanded to 6 mm and the case length is trimmed to 1.486 inches (37.7 mm), after which the neck is chamfered internally and externally. The case is once again lubricated and sized with a 6PPC full length die. The primer is decapped, the primer pocket is cleaned, and the case lubricant is removed. At this point, the case can be loaded. Prior to loading, competitors may also turn the neck walls of their case to a uniform given thickness. This increases the degree to which the bullet is aligned with the bore of the barrel.

As is common with competition cartridges, precise handloading, a good rifle, and practice make it possible to shoot tight and consistent groups. Shooters have managed 5- or 10-shot groups with center-to-center measures of under 0.200 in (5.1 mm) at 200 yards (180 m).

== Other developments ==
As with many competition rounds, variations develop and the PPC family of cartridges has served as the foundation for many. In the native 22 and 6mm calibers, there are numerous improved versions both with a shorter body to reduce powder capacity and longer body to increase powder capacity.

In 1985 Birgir Runar Saemundsson from Iceland designed the 30 PPC, by necking up the standard 6 PPC to shoot 308 caliber bullets. Bullets at that time were 125 grain Bergers, which proved to be too heavy. The lighter bullets of 105 to 115 grains (6.80 to 7.45 g) grains were needed. This caliber combination is very accurate for Bench Rest and Varmint for Score shooting.

In 1998 Arne Brennan conducted a theoretical study of calibers and cartridge cases and expanded the PPC family with the 6.5 PPC for the AR-15 rifle. As time evolved, the 6.5 PPC evolved into an improved case version like had been done for years with the 22 and 6 PPC. An improved 6.5 PPC variation branded the 6.5 Grendel was marketed by Alexander Arms LLC. Others are the 6.5 CSS marketed by CompetitionShooting.com, the 6.5 PPCX developed by Arne Brennan and optimized for 100–108 grains (6.48–7.00 g) 6.5mm bullets, and the 6.5 BPC developed by Jim Borden and Dr. Louis Palmisano and optimized for 81–88 grains (5.25–5.70 g) flat base bullets. Brass for these improved versions of the 6.5 PPC cartridge is made by Lapua and Hornady.

In 2007, Mark Walker created the .30 Walker - a .30 caliber version of the improved PPC optimized for use with 110–118 grains (7.13–7.65 g) flat base 30 caliber bullets. The .30 Walker was created for benchrest score shooting and has yielded impressive results with performance close to the .30 BR.

In January 2010, Les Baer Custom discontinued offering the Alexander Arms 6.5 Grendel which is a trademarked brand and required an insurance commitment until Alexander Arms released its trademark in 2011, and announced the release of the .264 LBC-AR as a wildcat without SAAMI specs as the Grendel has, but which takes nearly all of the same factory-loaded ammo that the Grendel can take. The LBC has a more shallow bolt-face than the standard-spec Grendel which removes 0.01 inches (0.25 mm) of steel from (weakens) the LBC's extractor claw, but makes the LBC bolt compatible with 7.62x39 AR15/M4 bolts and barrels. The LBC's bolt and barrel are both incompatible with the SAAMI-spec Grendel's bolt and barrel, and retailers are often passing the 264 LBC as a "Type 1 Grendel" and calling the original, trademarked Grendel a "type 2 Grendel," which is the SAAMI spec but with more powder capacity, longer cartridge overall length, bolt compatible with the SAAMI-spec, and usually no compound-angled throat but a 0.300 inches (7.6 mm) throat. The .264 LBC-AR chamber is designed with a 0.295 inches (7.5 mm) neck like the 6.5 CSS, but not a compound-angled throat like the SAAMI-spec Grendel, and uses a 1 degree throat design like the 6.5 PPCX.

== See also ==
- .22 PPC
- World Benchrest Shooting Federation
- List of firearms
- List of rifle cartridges
- Table of handgun and rifle cartridges
- 6 mm caliber

== Bibliography ==
- Frank C. Barnes: Cartridges of the World. A Complete and Illustrated Reference for Over 1500 Cartridges. 10th ed. Krause Publications. Iola WI 2006. pp 21–22. ISBN 0-89689-297-2
