= 6mm AR =

US centerfire wildcat rifle cartridge

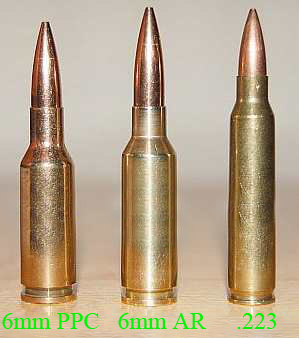
- Type: Centerfire rifle
- Place of origin: United States

Production history
- Designer: Robert Whitley

Specifications
- Parent case: 6.5 Grendel
- Case type: Rimless, bottleneck
- Bullet diameter: .243 in (6.2 mm)
- Neck diameter: .271 in (6.9 mm)
- Shoulder diameter: .4323 in (10.98 mm)
- Base diameter: .4433 in (11.26 mm)
- Rim diameter: .4449 in (11.30 mm)
- Rim thickness: .0591 in (1.50 mm)
- Case length: 1.525 in (38.7 mm)
- Overall length: 2.260 in (57.4 mm)
- Case capacity: 36 gr H_{2}O (2.3 cm^{3})
- Rifling twist: 1-8"
- Primer type: Small rifle

Ballistic performance
Bullet mass/type	Velocity	Energy
105 gr (7 g) Berger VLD	2,750 ft/s (840 m/s)	1,763 ft⋅lbf (2,390 J)

The 6mm AR / 6x38mm AR is an intermediate centerfire wildcat cartridge initially designed by Robert Whitley for long-range performance in an AR-15 rifle.

== Description ==
The cartridge uses a 6.5 Grendel case that has been necked-down to accept a 6.2 mm (.243 in) bullet.

The 6mm AR takes advantage of the wide variety of 6.2 mm (.243 in) caliber bullets. Slim, long bullets with high ballistic coefficient are ideal for energy retention at long ranges.

It is similar to the 6PDK which also uses a 6.2 mm bullet and a similar muzzle energy and case capacity to the 6mm AR and 6.5 Grendel, in a casing somewhat popular for the AR-15, a necked-down 6.8mm Remington SPC casing.

== 6mm AR Turbo 40 Improved ==
This variant uses an Ackley Improved fire formed case with less tapering and a 40-degree higher shoulder permitting a larger powder capacity. It is claimed by its maker to be capable of driving a 6.5 g (100 gr) or heavier grain projectile at 880 m/s (2,900 ft/s) (satisfying the "6mm Optimum").

== 6mm Rat and FatRat ==
These wildcats also push forward the shoulder of the same necked Grendel case similar to the Turbo 40, yielding more powder capacity. 6.5 g (100 gr) or heavier grain VLD boat-tail bullets have to be seated deeply within the case neck, however, rendering some of these volume gains illusory but there is an increase in volume even with the longer bullets nonetheless.

== 6mm Grinch ==
Similar to the 6mm Turbo 40 and 6mm FatRat, the 6mm Grinch has a blown-forward shoulder on par with the 6mm Dasher to eke maximum powder capacity from the necked Grendel case.

== See also ==
- 6mm ARC
- .223 Remington
- List of rifle cartridges
- Glossary of firearms terminology
