= .22 PPC =

Rifle cartridge

- Type: Rifle
- Place of origin: United States

Production history
- Designer: Louis Palmisano and Ferris Pindell
- Designed: 1974

Specifications
- Parent case: .220 Russian
- Bullet diameter: .224 in (5.7 mm)
- Neck diameter: .246 in (6.2 mm)
- Shoulder diameter: .430 in (10.9 mm)
- Base diameter: .445 in (11.3 mm)
- Case length: 1.505 in (38.2 mm)
- Overall length: 1.960 in (49.8 mm)
- Rifling twist: 1-14"
- Primer type: Small Rifle

The .22 PPC / 5.7x38mm is a centerfire rifle cartridge developed in 1974 by Dr. Louis Palmisano and Ferris Pindell, primarily as a benchrest cartridge. The cartridge is based on the 5.6×39mm (.220 Russian) case which is a necked-down version of the 7.62×39mm Soviet military cartridge. Several companies have made custom guns in this caliber, however no major companies did until 1993, when Ruger announced their No. 1 V and M77 varmint rifles in this caliber.

== Changes from the .220 Russian cartridge ==
The changes from the .220 Russian into the .22 PPC include a 10-degree body taper and 30-degree shoulder angle, as well as expanding the neck to accept the standard .224 inches (5.7 mm) diameter bullet used in the U.S. Cases are made in Finland by Sako or in Sweden by Norma and use Small Rifle primers. Although the .22 PPC is a short, rather stubby case (only 1.51 inches (38 mm) long), it nevertheless develops ballistics superior to some larger, longer cartridges such as the .222 and .223 Remington. The 52-grain bullet can be pushed out of the muzzle at over 3,500 feet per second (1,100 m/s), placing the .22 PPC in the varmint and small game class. A 1 in 14-inch (1 in 355 mm) twist has become pretty much standard for these rifles although 1 in 12-inch (1 in 305 mm) twist will sometimes be found, depending on the load and bullet weight.

== See also ==
- 6mm PPC
- World Benchrest Shooting Federation
- 5 mm caliber
- Table of handgun and rifle cartridges
