= 5.6×39mm =

Ammunition cartridge

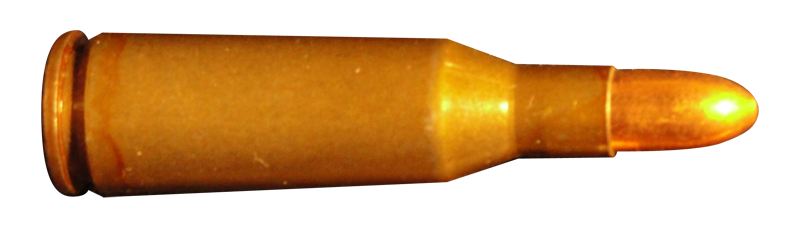
- Type: Hunting
- Place of origin: Soviet Union

Production history
- Designed: 1961
- Manufacturer: SAKO & Lapua

Specifications
- Parent case: 7.62×39mm
- Case type: Rimless, Bottle-Neck
- Bullet diameter: .223 in (5.7 mm)
- Land diameter: .220 in (5.6 mm)
- Neck diameter: .248 in (6.3 mm)
- Shoulder diameter: .402 in (10.2 mm)
- Base diameter: .447 in (11.4 mm)
- Rim diameter: .447 in (11.4 mm)
- Rim thickness: .059 in (1.5 mm)
- Case length: 1.524 in (38.7 mm)
- Overall length: 1.917 in (48.7 mm)
- Case capacity: 30.1 gr H_{2}O (1.95 cm^{3})
- Primer type: Small rifle
- Maximum pressure: 51,000 psi (350 MPa)

Ballistic performance
Bullet mass/type	Velocity	Energy
3.5 g (54 gr) SP	912.4 m/s (2,993 ft/s)	1,074.6 J (792.6 ft⋅lbf)
3.5 g (54 gr) FMJ
5.0 g (77 gr) SP

The 5.6×39mm, also known in the U.S. as .220 Russian, is a cartridge developed in 1961 for deer hunting in the USSR. It fires a 5.6mm projectile from necked down 7.62×39mm brass. While it originally re-used 7.62x39 cases, once it became popular enough commercial ammunition started being manufactured, both in the USSR and in Finland. When it was introduced to the United States by SAKO it was stamped .220 Russian. Lapua later changed the designation to .220 Russian for the American market as well.

Soviet 5.6×39mm cartridges were loaded with smokeless powder VT (винтовочный пироксилиновый порох ВТ), as well as Soviet 7.62×54mmR and 9×53mmR hunting cartridges. It is the parent case for the .22 PPC, 6mm PPC, and the 6.5mm Grendel cartridges.

== Ballistics ==
From Wolf.

Ballistic data (3.5 gram SP bullet)
Distance (m)	0	50	100	200	300	400	500
Velocity (m/s)	912.4	798.8	694.0	507.7	359.4	290.5	250.3
Energy (J)	1457	1117	843	451	226	148	110

== Firearms ==
In the Soviet Union, several hunting rifles were designed for this cartridge; MBO-1 target rifle, bolt-action carbine Bars, self-loading carbines MTs-127 (МЦ-127) and MTs-128 (МЦ-128), combination guns IZh-15, MTs-5-35 and MTs-105-01 (МЦ-105-01).

The TKB-022PM5 bullpup assault rifle, AO-36 assault rifle ("Автомат АО-36"), IZh-94 "Sever", "Saiga-5.6" ("Сайга-5.6"), and "Saiga-5.6S" ("Сайга-5.6С") have been chambered in 5.6×39mm.

== See also ==
- List of rifle cartridges
- 5 mm caliber
- 6.5 Grendel
