= 6.8 Western =

Centerfire rifle cartridge

- Type: Rifle
- Place of origin: United States

Production history
- Designer: Winchester Repeating Arms Company and Browning Arms Company
- Designed: 2021

Specifications
- Case type: Reduced flange, bottle-shaped
- Bullet diameter: .277 in (7.0 mm)
- Land diameter: .270 in (6.9 mm)
- Neck diameter: .314 in (8.0 mm)
- Shoulder diameter: .539 in (13.7 mm)
- Base diameter: .555 in (14.1 mm)
- Rim diameter: .535 in (13.6 mm)
- Case length: 2.020 in (51.3 mm)
- Overall length: 2.755–2.955 in (70.0–75.1 mm)
- Case capacity: 74.0-75.5 gr H2O
- Rifling twist: 1:8-1:75
- Primer type: Large rifle
- Maximum pressure (SAAMI): 65,000 psi (450 MPa)

Ballistic performance
Bullet mass/type	Velocity	Energy
165 gr (11 g) Accubond LR	2,970 ft/s (910 m/s)	3,226 ft⋅lbf (4,374 J)
170 gr (11 g) Ballistic Silvertrip	2,920 ft/s (890 m/s)	3,218 ft⋅lbf (4,363 J)
170 gr (11 g) Match BTHP	2,910 ft/s (890 m/s)	3,196 ft⋅lbf (4,333 J)
175 gr (11 g) Sierra Tipped GameKing	2,835 ft/s (864 m/s)	3,123 ft⋅lbf (4,234 J)
- Test barrel length: 24"; Source: All4shooters

The 6.8 Western is a centerfire rifle cartridge designed by Winchester Repeating Arms Company and Browning Arms Company. Introduced to the market in 2021 as a big game hunting cartridge that may be also used for long range target shooting.

== History ==
In 1925, Winchester introduced the .270 Winchester, previously known as the .270 WCF, based on the 30-06 Springfield case necked down to .277" (6.8 mm). Although the .270 Winchester was not an instant success, within a few decades it became one of the most popular big game hunting cartridges for mid sized game worldwide, because of its relatively mild recoil and flat trajectory within practical hunting ranges. Loaded with 130-grain spitzer bullets, the .270 Winchester achieved a muzzle velocity of 3,140 fps from a 24-inch barrel, with factory loads, resulting in a maximum point blank range (MPBR) of approximately 337 yards for a 8" diameter target.

With no competitors other than the .270 Weatherby Magnum, the .270 Winchester has remained the most popular cartridge of its class for nearly a century. By 2002, Winchester introduced the .270 Winchester Short Magnum, as part of its then-new line of Short Magnum cartridges, which was faster by 200 fps resulting in a flatter trajectory and approximately 50 more yards of MPBR, with the advantage of being chambered in a short action similar to the size of the .308 Winchester . However, this cartridge was designed to shoot 110- to 160-grain bullets to be stabilized by 1:10 twist barrels, similar to the .270 Win.

In 2007, Hornady launched its new 6.5 Creedmoor, also designed to be fed from a short action mechanism. Thought of as a bench-rest competition cartridge rather than a hunting cartridge, it is designed to shoot heavy-for-caliber, high B.C. bullets that need a faster twist to be stabilized. Nevertheless, it started to gain followers among hunters to become one of the most popular big game hunting calibers of the time, mainly due to the development of affordable rangefinders, which reduce the advantages of flat trajectories within moderate ranges as the shooter doesn't need to "guess" distances anymore.

Based on this new market trend for high ballistic coefficient bullets, fast twist barrels and short actions, Winchester in collaboration with Browning designed the 6.8 Western as a new alternative.

== Cartridge Design ==
The 6.8 Western is basically a .270 Winchester Short Magnum case with the shoulder moved back slightly (reducing the case's maximum powder capacity) that needs a barrel with a 1:8 twist to stabilize 165 to 175 grain bullets.

== Performance ==
With a 165-grain bullet, the 6.8 Western is capable of matching the muzzle velocity of a .270 Winchester loaded with a 150-grain bullet. The higher ballistic coefficient of the 6.8 Western results in a flatter trajectory at distances beyond 600 yards, which may be controversial for hunting purposes.

Centered 3 inches up at 100 yards it will be 4 inches low at 300 yards and 54 inches low at 600 yards still retaining 1500 ft·lb of energy, while a 130-grain .270 Winchester will retain approximately 1200 ft·lb and a 180-grain .300 Win Mag approximately 2000 ft·lb at the same distance.

== Sporting use ==
The 6.8 Western is an adequate cartridge for hunting mid size big game species such as whitetail and mule deer up to considerable distances. Due to its high BC and sectional density it is also adequate for elk and even moose. The possibility of chambering this cartridge in short action rifles as well as its capability to resist cross winds effectively makes it a very good option for mountain hunting.

== See also ==
- 270 Winchester
- 270 Winchester Short Magnum
- 270 Weatherby Magnum
