= Jack O'Connor (writer) =

American writer (1902–1978)

John Woolf O'Connor (January 22, 1902 – January 20, 1978) was a writer and outdoorsman, best known as a writer for Outdoor Life magazine, where he served as Shooting Editor for 31 years.

== Early life ==
Jack O'Connor was born in Nogales, Arizona, a territory he described as the last frontier. His parents divorced when he was a young child and his maternal grandfather, James Woolf, helped raise him and exposed him to the outdoors and hunting. His grandfather was basically a bird hunter, but Jack developed an interest for hunting big game at a young age. In chapter 9 of his book "The Hunting Rifle", he quotes the story of his first buck, a desert mule deer that he took at young age. He also hunted a small subspecies of whitetail deer known today as the coues deer (Oodocileus virginianus couesi), which inhabits the desert mountains of the southwestern United States and Mexico.

== English teacher and writer ==
O'Connor worked as a college professor of English and journalism at Sul Ross State Normal College (today, Sul Ross State University) in Alpine, Texas until 1945, when he quit teaching to write full-time.

According to the introduction written by his son, Bradford, for The Lost Classics of Jack O'Connor (2004), O'Connor wrote more than 1200 articles for hunting and fishing magazines, and also wrote romantic novellas and articles for Redbook, Mademoiselle, Reader's Digest, Cosmopolitan, Esquire, the literary magazine Midland, and other magazines popular in the 1930s and 1940s.

O'Connor wrote over a dozen non-fiction books including Game in the Desert, The Rifle Book, The Complete Book of Rifles and Shotguns, The Big Game Animals of North America, The Art of Hunting Big Game in North America, and Sheep and Sheep Hunting. He also wrote two western novels, Conquest and Boom Town, and the autobiography of his formative years: Horse and Buggy West: A Boyhood on the Last Frontier.

The papers of Jack (John Woolf) O'Connor (1902-1978) of Lewiston, Idaho, were donated to the Washington State University Libraries in November 1978, by his son, Bradford O'Connor, and daughters, Caroline O'Connor McCullam and Catherine O'Connor Baker, all of Seattle. The O'Connor papers (MS 78-50) were enlarged by the addition of an extensive correspondence series (MS 79-17) donated by Margorie E. Poleson, long-time secretary to O'Connor, in May 1979.

== .270 Winchester proponent ==
O'Connor was well known among shooters and hunters as a proponent of various cartridges such as the .30-06 Springfield, 7x57mm Mauser (.275 Rigby), and for his knowledge of hunting and shooting, but especially for the .270 Winchester with which he collected many North American big game animals including the giant moose. Jack favored the 130 grain spitzer bullet leaving the muzzle of a 24 inch barrel at 3160 fps. The high velocity, flat trajectory and high sectional density of the cartridge made it a preferable mountain hunting cartridge for many hunters, and through his writings, O'Connor helped place it as one of the most popular big game hunting cartridges worldwide, for medium-sized game, up to date.

== On hunting ==
Though Jack O'Connor hunted a wide variety of game in different parts of the world, he was primarily a big game hunter focused on the local species of sheep and deer inhabiting his homeland.

=== Sheep hunting ===
For Jack O'Connor, sheep were a sought after but challenging game. Since his first bighorn sheep hunt, which was unsuccessful, O'Connor got hooked on it. He achieved two grand slams of sheep hunting (before the term existed), which consists of taking the 4 species of North American Sheep; including a Dall ram hunted with a .30-06, during an expedition to the Yukon Territory with 15 1/2 inch bases and its longest full curled horn falling short of 44 inches, considered one of the best rams of the species ever hunted. He also hunted sheep in Iran and Turkey.

=== Deer hunting ===
However he hunted deer extensively, mainly the southwestern whitetail deer when he lived in Arizona, mule deer and Elk, having more opportunity to hunt the later when he moved to Idaho.

== On hunting rifles ==
His experience hunting big game in mountain terrain made him develop the concept of the mountain rifle. The rifle should be light, accurate and balanced; but also pleasant to the eye. His most popular rifles were built by Alvin Biesen around Winchester Model 70 controlled round feed actions, usually chambered for his favorite cartridge, the .270 Winchester, of which the most renowned one is probably a customized Model 70 named "No.2":

"The wood is quite dense, flawlessly inletted, and rather plain. Biesen left the barrel intact (He turned down the standard-weight Model 70 barrels on which he worked.), tuned the trigger, replaced the loathsome aluminum floorplate with a steel one and converted the floorplate release to a straddle type. Checkering was 26 lpi, in his distinctive fleur-de-lis pattern, and the stock has an embossed grip cap and buttplate. For a scope, Biesen used a 4X Leupold Mountaineer mounted very low and very far forward in a Tilden mount".

He also praised the Springfield 1903 and Mauser 98 actions, and had rifles customized by other renowned gunsmith of the time such as Alvin Linden, who restocked his first model 70 rifle, W.A. Sukalle, and Griffin & Howe. His last rifle was a Ruger M77 customized by Al Biesen, chambered in the .280 Remington cartridge to the following specifications:

“Stock French walnut in a nice grained contrasty piece not so elaborate with Deluxe Fleur-de-lis checkering, ebony forend tip, skeleton grip cap and skeleton butt plate. Old Win. Style swivel studs. Metal work Barrel was recontoured to light weight dimensions. Trigger guard hand made Blackburn style one piece model etc. Bolt handle knob hand checkered in four panel design, trimmed for style and shape. Trigger reworked and tightened with a nice let off. Action trued and hand polished, hand finished inside and polished for smooth working etc. Bolt jeweled. Special scope rings and mounts hand made to lighten them. Leupold 4 power scope. All metal parts blued with a Black Velvet non glare finish. Front swivel stud on barrel. Safety reworked and a Silver letter “S” ahead of safety showing safe position. Al Biesen Gunmaker Spokane Wn And Rem. 280 in Silver on the barrel.”

== List of books ==
- Game in the Desert - 1939
- Hunting in the Rockies - 1947
- The Rifle Book - 1949
- The Big Game Rifle - 1952
- The Big Game Animals of North America - 1961
- Complete Book of Rifles and Shotguns: With a Seven-Lesson Rifle Course - 1961
- The Complete Book of Shooting - 1965
- The Shotgun Book - 1965
- The Art of Hunting Big Game in North America - 1967
- Horse and Buggy West - 1969
- The Hunting Rifle - 1970
- Sheep and Sheep Hunting - 1974
- Jack O'Connor's Gun Book
- Hunting on Three Continents with Jack O'Connor Vol.1
- Hunting on Three Continents with Jack O'Connor Vol.2
- Classic O'Connor: 45 Worldwide Hunting Adventures

== Jack O'Connor Hunting Heritage Center ==
In 2006 the Jack O'Connor Hunting Heritage and Education Center opened at Hells Gate State Park on the Snake River, near Lewiston, Idaho. Many of his big game trophies are on display there, along with other memorabilia, including his favorite .270 rifle.

== See also ==
- List of big-game hunters
