= .270 Weatherby Magnum =

Rifle cartridge

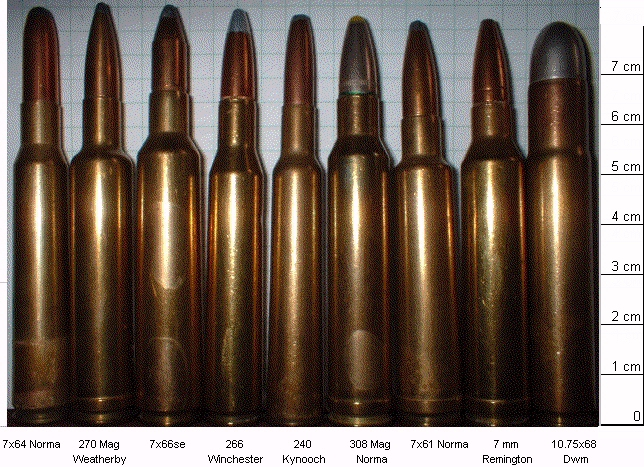
- .270 Weatherby 2nd from left
- Type: Rifle / Hunting
- Place of origin: USA

Production history
- Designer: Roy Weatherby
- Designed: 1943
- Manufacturer: Weatherby

Specifications
- Parent case: .300 H&H Magnum
- Case type: Belted, bottleneck
- Bullet diameter: .277 in (7.0 mm)
- Neck diameter: .303 in (7.7 mm)
- Shoulder diameter: .492 in (12.5 mm)
- Base diameter: .512 in (13.0 mm)
- Rim diameter: .531 in (13.5 mm)
- Rim thickness: .220 in (5.6 mm)
- Case length: 2.55 in (65 mm)
- Overall length: 3.25 in (83 mm)
- Rifling twist: 1-10"
- Primer type: Large rifle magnum

Ballistic performance
Bullet mass/type	Velocity	Energy
110 gr (7 g) HP	3,528 ft/s (1,075 m/s)	3,041 ft⋅lbf (4,123 J)
130 gr (8 g) X	3,338 ft/s (1,017 m/s)	3,217 ft⋅lbf (4,362 J)
140 gr (9 g) BT	3,242 ft/s (988 m/s)	3,268 ft⋅lbf (4,431 J)
150 gr (10 g) SBT	3,161 ft/s (963 m/s)	3,329 ft⋅lbf (4,514 J)
- Test barrel length: 26"; Source: Accurate Powder

The .270 Weatherby Magnum was the first belted magnum based on the .300 H&H Magnum to be developed by Roy Weatherby in 1943. The cartridge is short enough to function in standard-length long actions with a brass length of 2.549" or 64.74mm and an overall length of about 3.295".

== History and design ==
The development of the .270 Weatherby Magnum led to the characteristic double-radius shoulders belted magnum case, proprietary of the Weatherby Magnum line of cartridges. Particularly, the .270 Wby Mag the result of necked down to accommodate the .277 in bullets and bringing down the case to fit a standard length action. Like most Weatherby cartridges, the .270 Weatherby was standardized by the Small Arms and Ammunitions Manufacturers Institute in 1994, and it has a SAAMI maximum pressure limit of 62,500 psi. The first Weatherby cartridge to be used in Africa was the .270 Weatherby on a jackal on June 8, 1948.

== Performance ==
Given its higher pressure and larger case which holds more powder than the .270 Winchester, the .270 Weatherby has about 200 ft/s faster performance with any particular bullet weight. It also outperforms newer cartridge designs such as the .270 WSM and the 6.8 Western. This performance comes at the cost of more recoil and barrel heat. In addition, a long barrel is necessary to take advantage of extra powder to gain maximum velocity. The cartridge is excellent at long-range hunting, but is not well suited to high-volume shooting such as varmint hunting.

For those handloading their own cartridges, this is an easy round to load. It does best with full-power loads and is not well-suited for reduced loads. Ed Weatherby, son of Roy Weatherby says that the .270 Weatherby is his favorite caliber. As he puts it, there just isn't a better long-range deer caliber. He goes on to mention that it is also quite effective for elk, and pronghorn.

== Sporting use ==
Due to its flat trajectory result of a combination of a high muzzle velocity and ballistic coefficient, the .270 Wby Mag makes an excellent cartridge option for mid sized big game out to considerable ranges and the fact of being chambered in standard length actions allows the possibility of manufacturing a light mountain rifle.

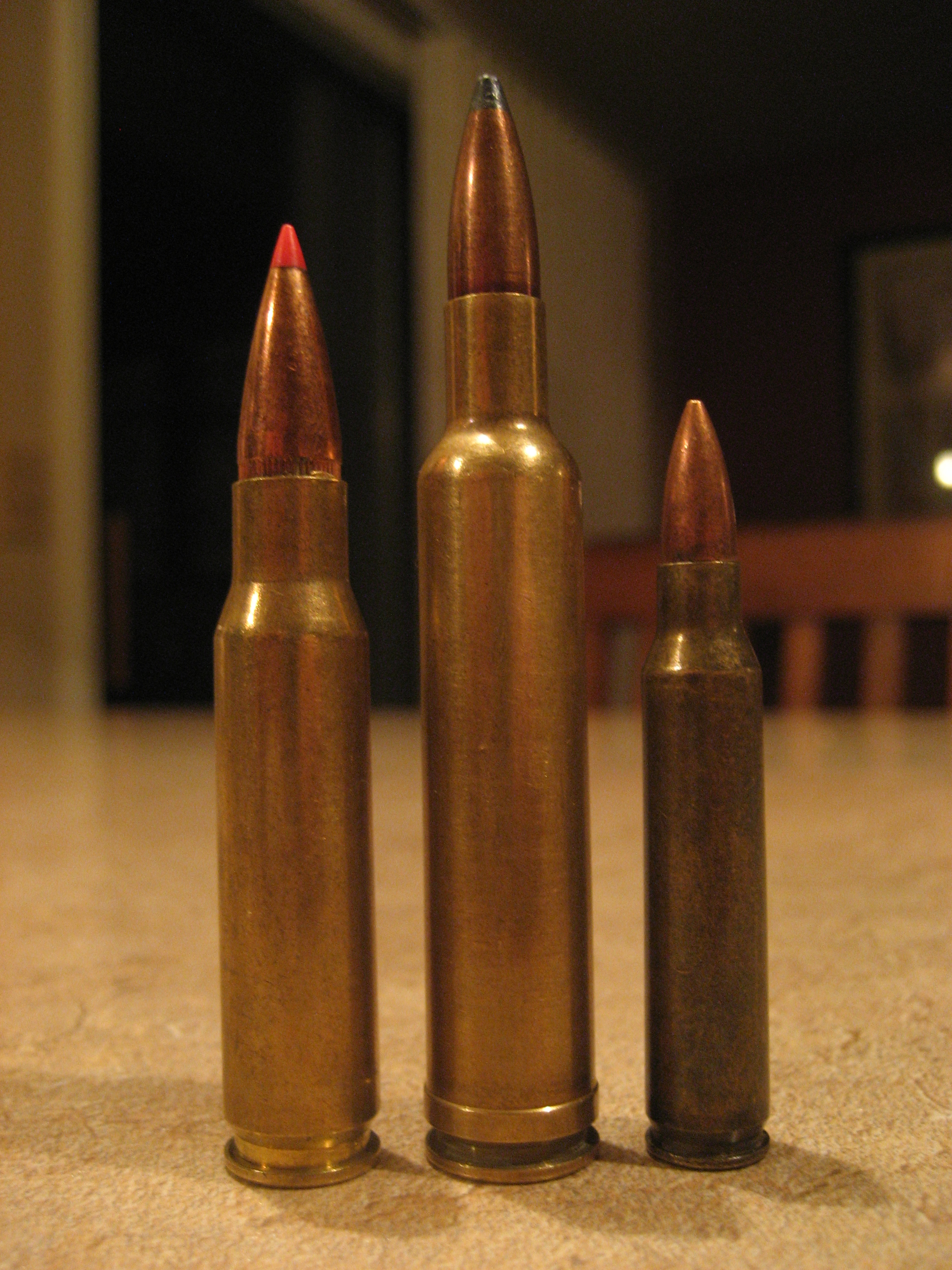
.308 Winchester (left) .270 Weatherby Magnum (center) .223 Remington (Right)

== See also ==
- List of rifle cartridges
- Table of handgun and rifle cartridges
- 6.8 mm caliber
