= .30-03 Springfield =

Obsolete American military rifle cartridge

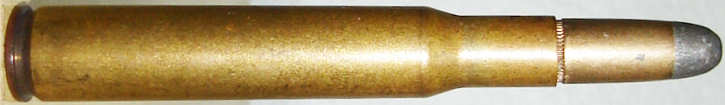
- A jacketed soft point round
- Type: Rifle
- Place of origin: United States

Service history
- Used by: United States

Production history
- Produced: 1903–1911

Specifications
- Parent case: .30-01 or Thick-rim
- Case type: Rimless, bottleneck
- Bullet diameter: .308 in (7.8 mm)
- Neck diameter: .340 in (8.6 mm)
- Shoulder diameter: .441 in (11.2 mm)
- Base diameter: .470 in (11.9 mm)
- Rim diameter: .473 in (12.0 mm)
- Rim thickness: .045 in (1.1 mm)
- Case length: 2.54 in (65 mm)
- Overall length: 3.34 in (85 mm)
- Rifling twist: 1-10
- Primer type: Large rifle

Ballistic performance
Bullet mass/type	Velocity	Energy
220 gr (14 g) FMJ	2,300 ft/s (700 m/s)	2,585 ft⋅lbf (3,505 J)

The .30-03 Springfield (7.62×65mm) was a short-lived cartridge developed by the United States in 1903, to replace the .30-40 Krag in the new Springfield 1903 rifle. The .30-03 was also called the .30-45, since it used a 45 grain (2.9 g (0.10 oz)) powder charge; the name was changed to .30-03 to indicate the year of adoption. It used a 220 grain (14 g (0.49 oz)) roundnose bullet. It was replaced after only three years of service by the .30-06, firing a spitzer bullet that had better ballistic performance.

== Initial development ==
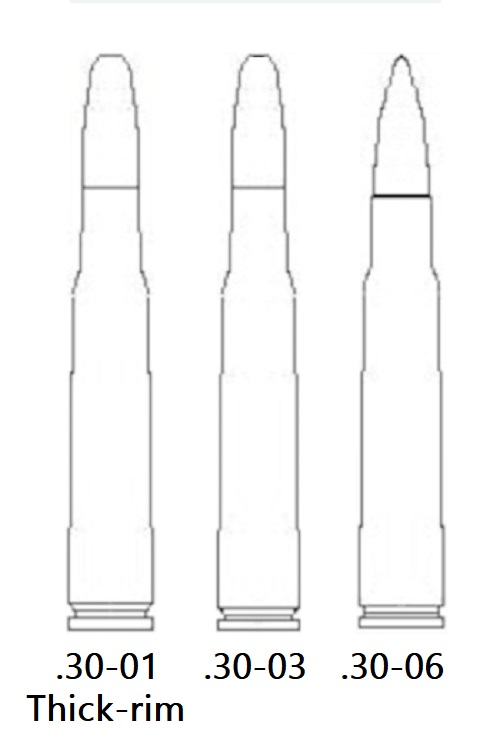
Comparison of .30-01, .30-03, and .30-06 geometry

The .30-03 was developed to replace the .30-40 Krag cartridge used in the Krag–Jørgensen rifle, which was the first bolt action rifle adopted by the US military, and the first that used smokeless powder. The Krag–Jørgensen rifle had some serious limitations compared to the new Mauser rifles being used by European armies; its 5-round capsule magazine was loaded one round at a time, rather than using a stripper clip into a box magazine, and the Krag–Jørgensen's single locking lug on the bolt made the action much weaker than the strong, two lug Mauser bolt, limiting the power of the round. A new rifle was designed, using the Mauser as a guide, and a new cartridge was designed for it.

Initially the .30-01 cartridge was developed in 1901; also referred to as the .30 ball Model of 1901 - the ".30-01" or "Thick-rim", the .30-01 used a bullet covered by an alloy made from copper and nickel and was the immediate predecessor of the .30-03. It was short-lived however, quickly being replaced by the .30-03 cartridge.

The new cartridge was more powerful, using a 45-grain (2.9 g) charge of smokeless powder, 5 grains (0.3 g) more than the .30-40. The bullet was the same, a .30 caliber, 220 grain (14 g) round-nosed jacketed bullet, at a higher velocity of 2,300 feet per second (700 m/s), compared to the 2,000 feet per second (610 m/s) of the .30-40 Krag. The new rifle was also the first in a trend of shorter infantry rifles; the 24 in (610 mm) barrel was halfway between the standard infantry rifle and the carbine used by the cavalry, and thus there was no carbine variant of the 1903 rifle. The .30-03 cartridge was also a rimless design, which allowed better feeding through the box magazine than the old .30-40 Krag case. The Model 1895 Winchester lever-action rifle was offered in .30-03 from 1905, but sold poorly in comparison to the .30-06 chambering offered in 1908. Vickers Company in England produced Maxim M1904 machine guns in .30-03 for the US Army from 1908. Later M1904 machine guns were produced by Colt in .30-06 and the .30-03 guns were re-chambered for the .30-06.

In 1903, the Army converted its M1900 Gatling guns in .30 Army to fit the new .30-03 cartridge as the M1903. The later M1903-'06 was an M1903 converted to .30-06. This conversion was principally carried out at the Army's Springfield Armory arsenal repair shops. All models of Gatling guns were declared obsolete by the U.S. Army in 1911, after 45 years of service.

== Problems ==
The .30-03 cartridge suffered from the start. It caused severe erosion of the bore of the rifle, due to the high pressures and temperatures needed to push the heavy bullet to the desired velocity. The heavy bullet was also an issue; the 220 grain (14 g) bullet was aerodynamically inefficient and had a very curved trajectory (see external ballistics) so it was not well suited for long-range shots. It was also unfashionable since most countries were switching to a 7 or 8 mm cartridge firing a lighter, around 150 grains (9.7 g), spitzer pointed bullet at a higher velocity. This gave better energy retention and a flatter trajectory. The .30-03 was shortened slightly by 0.046 inches (1.2 mm) in the neck, the powder was reformulated to burn cooler, and the bullet was changed to a 150 grain (9.7 g) spitzer bullet, creating the .30-06 cartridge.

Since the new .30-06 was shorter than the .30-03, it could fire in 1903 rifles but resulted in poor accuracy. The 1903 rifles were all recalled, fitted with the Model of 1905 sights and bayonets, and rechambered for the new .30-06 cartridge. This last procedure was done by unscrewing the barrels, milling off the end of each chamber, re-threading the barrels, rechambering them, and screwing them back on the same actions. This ended the short life of the .30-03; out of nearly 75,000 made, few original 1903 rifles escaped the conversion to .30-06 (estimates range from 50 to 100 rifles); surviving .30-03 rifles are rare collector's items. Even the .30-03 cartridge is a rarity and is found only in collections of rare cartridges. The .270 Winchester cartridge was based on reducing the neck diameter of the .30-03 cartridge case to retain a similar overall length with the same shoulder based on observation of the Chinese military trials of 6.8x57 Mauser in the US.

== See also ==
- List of rifle cartridges
- 7 mm caliber
