= .270 Winchester =

Rifle cartridge

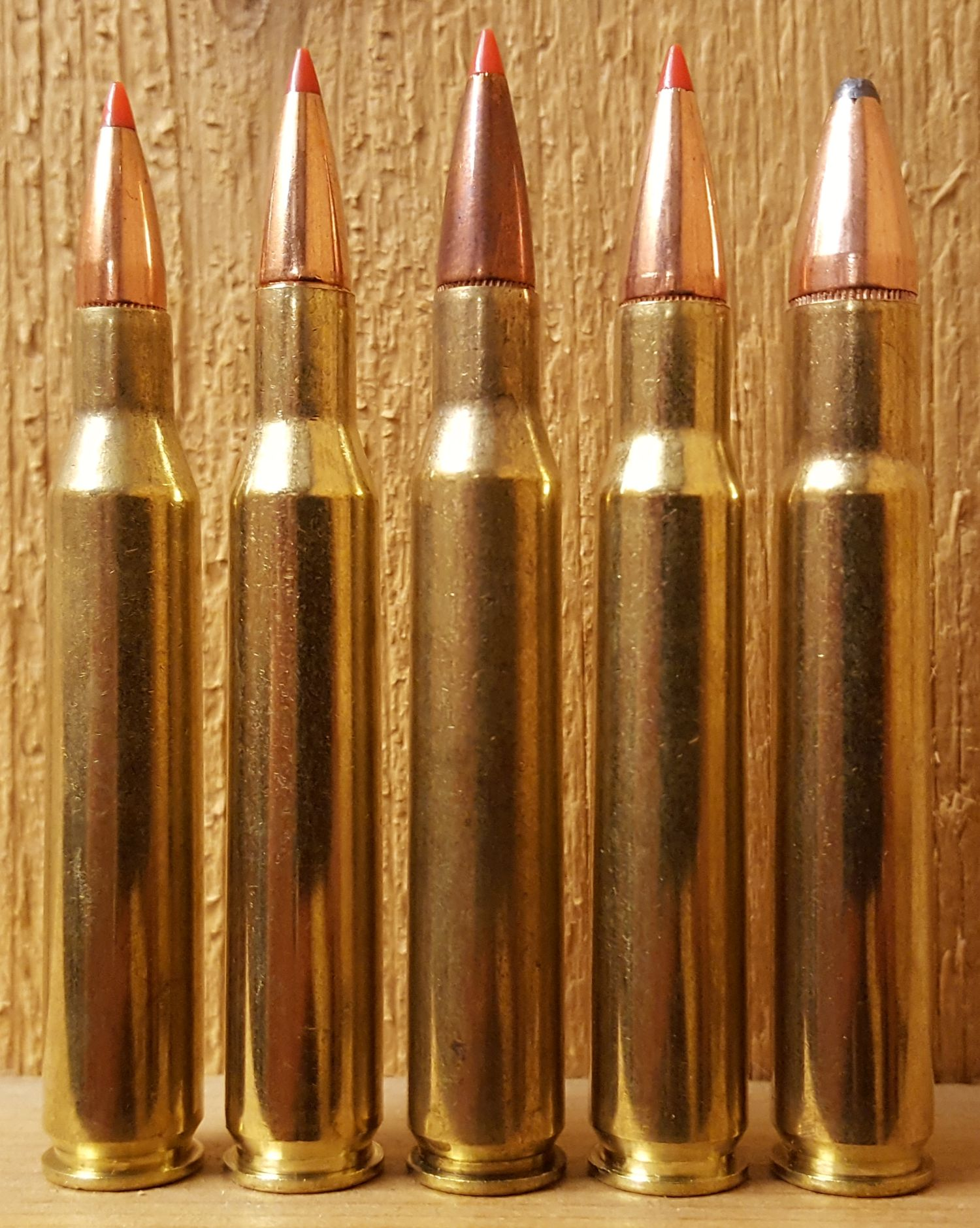
- From left: .25-06, .270 Winchester, .280 Remington, .30-06, .35 Whelen
- Type: Rifle / hunting
- Place of origin: United States

Production history
- Designer: Winchester
- Designed: 1923
- Manufacturer: Winchester
- Produced: 1925–present

Specifications
- Parent case: .30-03 Springfield
- Case type: Rimless, bottleneck
- Bullet diameter: .277 in (7.0 mm)
- Land diameter: .270 in (6.9 mm)
- Neck diameter: .308 in (7.8 mm)
- Shoulder diameter: .441 in (11.2 mm)
- Base diameter: .470 in (11.9 mm)
- Rim diameter: .473 in (12.0 mm)
- Case length: 2.540 in (64.5 mm)
- Overall length: 3.340 in (84.8 mm)
- Case capacity: 67 gr H_{2}O (4.3 cm^{3})
- Rifling twist: 1 in 10 in (250 mm)
- Primer type: Large rifle
- Maximum pressure (C.I.P.): 62,366 psi (430.00 MPa)
- Maximum pressure (SAAMI): 65,000 psi (450 MPa)

Ballistic performance
Bullet mass/type	Velocity	Energy
90 gr (6 g) HP	3,603 ft/s (1,098 m/s)	2,595 ft⋅lbf (3,518 J)
130 gr (8 g) SP	3,060 ft/s (930 m/s)	2,702 ft⋅lbf (3,663 J)
140 gr (9 g) SP	2,950 ft/s (900 m/s)	2,705 ft⋅lbf (3,667 J)
150 gr (10 g) SP	2,850 ft/s (870 m/s)	2,705 ft⋅lbf (3,667 J)
130 gr (8 g) SST	3,050 ft/s (930 m/s)	2,685 ft⋅lbf (3,640 J)
- Sources: Norma, Hodgdon, Hornady

The .270 Winchester is a rifle cartridge developed by Winchester Repeating Arms Company in 1923, and it was unveiled in 1925 as a chambering for their bolt-action Model 54 to become arguably the flattest shooting cartridge of its day, only competing with the .300 Holland & Holland Magnum, also introduced in the same year.

The .270 Winchester case is a necked down .30-03 Springfield, retaining the slightly longer neck of that original parent cartridge. (Note the actual SAAMI and CIP length specifications of the .270 Winchester vs. the .30-06 Springfield and that of their parent cartridge the .30-03 Springfield, with a C.I.P. length of 64.52mm, and a SAAMI of 2.540 inches). Winchester had chambered the Model 1895 Lever Action Rifle in .30-03 Springfield in 1905, then the slightly shorter .30-06 Springfield in 1908.) The .270 Winchester uses a .270 inch (6.86 mm) bore diameter and a .277 inch (7.04 mm) bullet diameter. The bore diameter was likely inspired by 7mm Mauser. The physics of lead projectiles determines that .277in. bullets of a similar material and weight to the .308in. bullet (commonly used in the .30-06 Springfield) will obviously have to be longer than that similar weight .308in. lead projectile. As an example compare bullets of the same weight but different calibers. The 150gr. .277 caliber bullet is longer and has a higher sectional density vs. the ballistically significant shorter length and lower sectional density of a 150gr. .308 caliber bullet. The use of the longer cartridge case neck was a design element to complement those longer bullets with better sectional density. At one point in the past though, reloaders "in a pinch" have been known to use 30-06 cases to form an acceptable and reloadable .270 Winchester case, understanding that the neck will be shorter since the shoulder will be moved forward (wildcat cartridge, .30-06 Springfield wildcat cartridges). This works though now it is not considered a common reloading solution, especially since actual .270 Winchester ammunition and reloadable cases are plentiful and easy to acquire due to the cartridge's longtime popularity.

== History ==
Introduced in 1925 along with the Winchester Model 54 bolt action rifle under the name "270 WCF" (270 Winchester Centerfire), the .270 Winchester was not an immediate success due to the popularity of the relatively recently introduced .30-06 Springfield, chambered for the M1903 Springfield bolt action rifle, which was commonly "sporterized" for hunting purposes.

The earliest iteration of the .270 Winchester cartridge was introduced with the Winchester Model 51 Imperial rifle probably in or about 1919. Only 24 Winchester Model 51's were produced, and only a handful of those were chambered in and marked ".27 Cal". Winchester's .27 Caliber was renamed 270 Winchester with the Model 54, the replacement for the Model 51 Winchester rifle. Winchester Model 51 serial number 1 is marked .27 Cal as is serial number 3 which is in the collection of the Cody Firearms Museum at the Buffalo Bill Center of the West in Cody, Wyoming.

However, the .270 Winchester attained great popularity among hunters and sporting rifle enthusiasts in the succeeding decades and especially in the post-World War II period, ranking it among the most popular and widely used big game hunting cartridges worldwide, especially with the widespread popularity of rifle scopes. Shooters started noticing that the .277" caliber cartridge was capable of shooting flatter than the popular 30–06.

The .270 Winchester, conceived solely as a big game hunting cartridge, became very popular, in part, due to the widespread praises of gun writer Jack O'Connor who used the cartridge for 40 years and touted its merits in the pages of Outdoor Life as well as other renowned gun writers of the time such as Col. Townsend Whelen.

The cartridge was initially commercially loaded to drive a 130 grain (8.4 gram) bullet at approximately 960 m/s (3,140 ft/s), later reduced to 930 m/s (3,060 ft/s), demonstrating a high performance at the time of its introduction while being marketed as a suitable cartridge for big game shooting in the 270 to 460 metres (300 to 500 yd) range. Two additional bullet weights were soon introduced: a 100-grain (6.5 gram) hollow-point bullet for varmint shooting, and a 150 grain (9.7 gram) bullet, offering a higher sectional density, which made it suitable for achieving better penetration for large sized deer, such as wapiti, and moose. However, the 130 grain bullet remains the most popular option.

For decades the only other commercial 6.8mm cartridge available for sporting purposes was the .270 Weatherby Magnum, which offered a flatter trajectory based on the larger powder capacity allowed by the belted magnum case, however due to the higher price and offer limit, it never reached the popularity of the .270 Winchester.

More recently a new breed of .277" caliber cartridges have been introduced to the market, including the .270 Winchester Short Magnum, which launches a bullet of the same weight 200 fps faster from a short action mechanism; the 27 Nosler, which is even faster but uses substantially more powder, and the recent 6.8 Western, which is basically a modification of the 270 WSM firing a heavier and larger bullet with a higher ballistic coefficient. The latest .277 round is Sig Sauer's .277 Fury, which utilizes a hybrid steel and brass case to safely reach 80,000 psi. Nevertheless, none of these new cartridges match the popularity of the old 270 Winchester and offer little advantage for practical hunting purposes.

Other of the main reasons why the .270 Win is still one of the most popular loads is because of its acceptance worldwide. Internationally, ammunition and firearms manufacturers offer this chambering in a wide range of firearm options including bolt-actions, single-shots, lever-actions (such as the Browning BLR), pump-actions (such as the Remington 7600), autoloaders (such as the Remington 7400), and even a few double rifles.

== Sporting use ==
The .270 Winchester is a suitable cartridge for hunting deer-sized game at open ranges making it suitable for plains game and mountain hunting. It may be chambered in standard length actions and though the optimum barrel size is considered to be 24 inches, it doesn't lose much muzzle velocity with 22 inch barrels, making it a suitable cartridge for developing a light mountain rifle.

The .270 Winchester cartridge is equipped with a 130-grain bullet traveling at approximately 3,060 feet per second (fps). When sighted in to intersect 3 inches above the line of sight at 100 yards (about 90 meters), it maintains a trajectory that rises no more than 3.5 inches and aligns with the line of sight around 270 yards. This setup allows for a maximum point blank range of roughly 325 yards, ideal for effectively targeting game the size of deer within a 7-inch diameter target area. Hunters can shoot confidently within this range without needing to adjust for bullet drop. Additionally, the cartridge, loaded with the 130-grain bullet, retains around 1,500 foot-pounds of energy up to 400 yards, meeting the minimum recommended for hunting elk.

== Performance ==
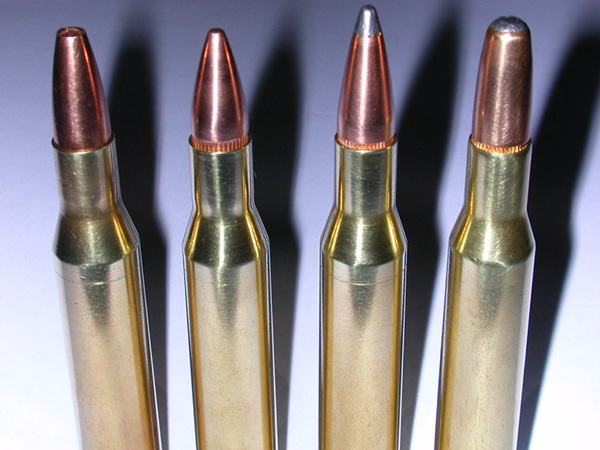
Left to right 130-grain (8.4 g) - hollow point, 100-grain (6.5 g) FMJBT, 130-grain (8.4 g) soft point, 160-grain (10 g) lead round nose

Cartridges are commonly available from 6.5 to 10.4 grams (100 to 160 gr) sizes with 8.4-and-9.7-gram (130 and 150 gr) loads being by far the most popular. Though handloaders have a wider range of options with the availability of bullets in a number of weights from 90 to 180 grains (5.8 to 11.7 grams), rifles are barrelled with 1:10 inch twist rifling, which may stabilize bullets up to 150 gr in order to provide the required accuracy expected. Common bullet weight recommendations for shooting different game are as follows:

- 5.8–7.1 grams (90–110 gr) bullets: varmint and small deer
- 8.4 grams (130 gr) bullets: deer size game including mule deer, white tail, sheep, mountain goats, antelope
- 9.1–10.4 grams (140–160 gr) bullets: deer, red stag, elk, moose, caribou, and similar larger animals.

However, bullet construction is more important than bullet weight in order to shoot the heavier game.

Recent introductions of low-drag bullets suited to the .270 Winchester such as the Nosler Accubond Long-Range, Hornady ELD-X and Matrix long-range bullets are promoting renewed interest in the cartridge among long-range hunters.

While it is true that a .270 Winchester case can be formed from a .30-06 Springfield case, the case length of a .30-06 is 63.3 millimetres (2.494 in) while the case length of a .270 is 64.5 millimetres (2.540 in). However, the brass of a .30-06 case will often stretch, or lengthen, past the dimension of the .30-06 case when necked down to form a .270 case requiring trimming regardless, and "The slight difference in length of reformed cases doesn't make any practical difference."

== See also ==
- List of rifle cartridges
- Table of handgun and rifle cartridges
- 7 mm caliber
- .270 Winchester Short Magnum
- 6.8 Western
- 6.8mm Remington SPC
- .277 Wolverine
- sectional density
