= Spitzer (bullet) =

Type of bullet design

Features

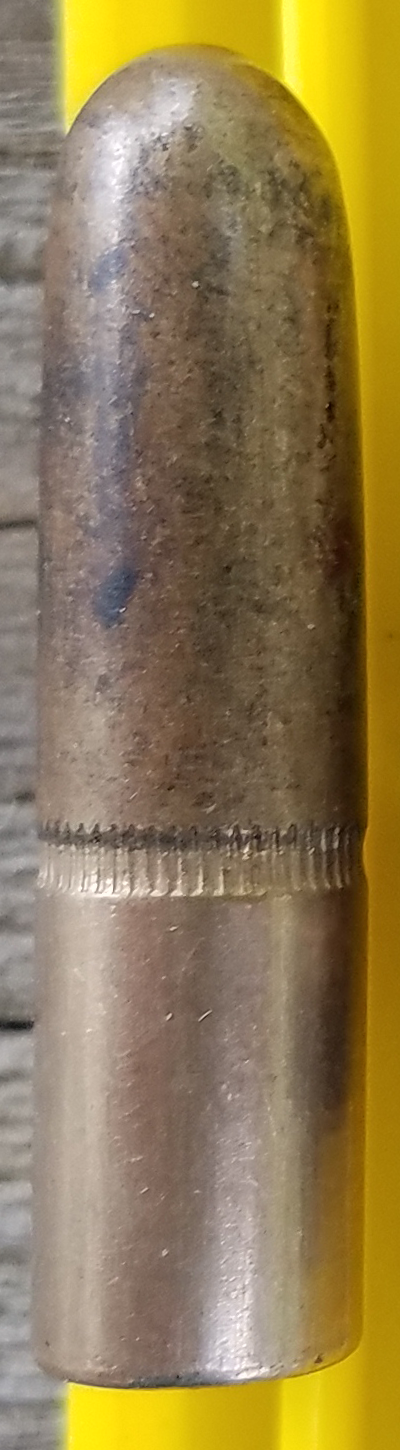
Round nose
flat base

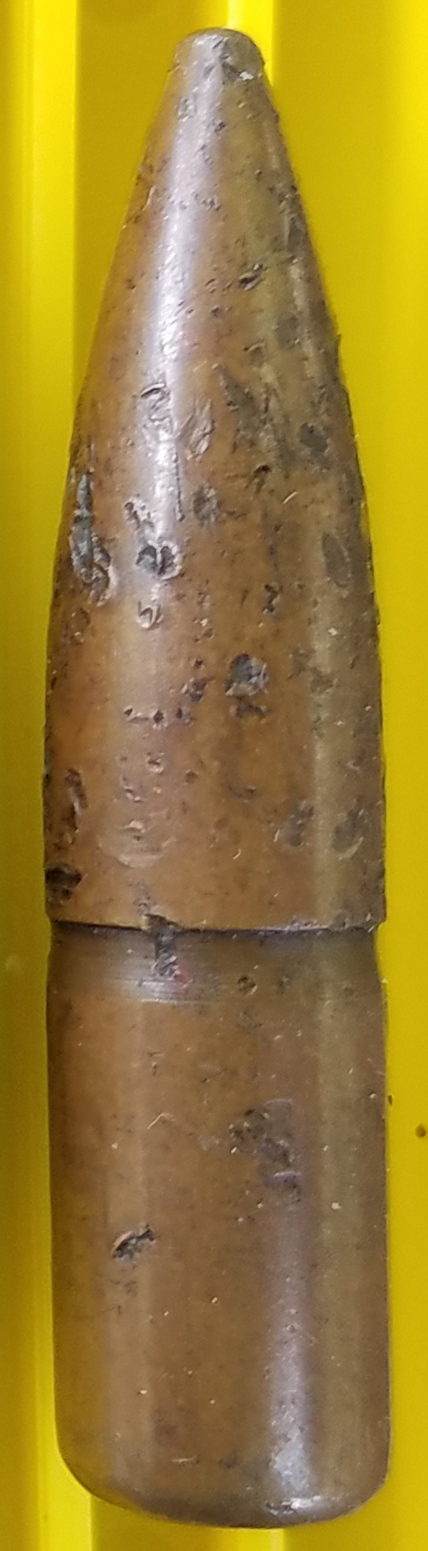
Spire point
flat base
(spitzer)

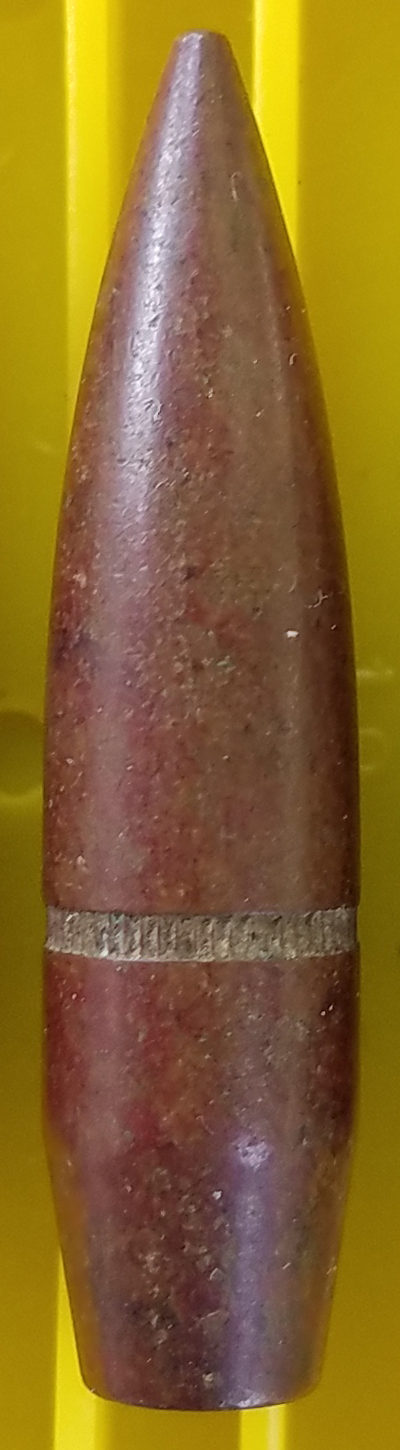
Spire point
boat-tail
(spitzer)

A spitzer bullet (from German Spitzgeschoss 'point-shot') is a munitions term, primarily regarding fully-powered and intermediate small-arms ammunition, describing bullets featuring an aerodynamically pointed nose shape, called a spire point, sometimes combined with a tapered base, called a boat-tail (then a spitzer boat-tail bullet), in order to reduce drag and obtain a lower drag coefficient, resulting in an aerodynamically superior projectile, which decelerates less rapidly and has improved external ballistic behaviour, at the expense of some potential weight and kinetic energy relative to blunter ogive/round/flat-nose flat-base projectiles.

The type was developed for military purposes in the late 19th and early 20th century and was a major design improvement compared to earlier rounder or flatter-tipped bullets in terms of range and accuracy. Its introduction, along with long-range volley sights for service rifles, changed military doctrines. Area targets at ranges up to 1,420–2,606 m (1,550–2,850 yd) could be subject to rifle fire. With improvements in machine guns at the turn of the 20th century, the addition of clinometers meant that fixed machine gun squads could deliver plunging fire or indirect fire at more than 3,000 m (3,280 yd). The indirect firing method exploits the maximal effective range, that is defined by the maximum range of a small-arms projectile while still maintaining the minimum kinetic energy required to put unprotected personnel out of action, which is generally believed to be 15 kilogram-meters (147 J / 108 ft⋅lbf).

Spitzer bullets greatly increased the lethality of the battlefields of World War I. Before, during and after World War I, militaries adopted even more aerodynamically refined spitzer projectiles by combining a pointed nose with a slightly tapered base at the rear, a so called boat tail, which further reduced drag in flight. These projectiles were known as spitzer boat-tail bullets which increased the terminal maximum ranges of fully-powered rifle cartridges to between 4,115 and 5,500 m (4,500 and 6,010 yd).

== Etymology ==
The name "spitzer" is an anglicized form of the German word Spitzgeschoss, literally meaning "point-shot".

== History ==
=== Design requirements ===
From the mid to late 19th century, European military research had started to examine how to maximise available small arms muzzle velocity through improved projectile design. Stronger metal casings were being used to contain cartridge propellants, making small arms more powerful but not any more accurate. Designers knew that bullets with a lower drag coefficient (C_{d}) would decelerate less rapidly and therefore travel further. A lower drag coefficient also flattens the projectile's trajectory, making it more stable in flight and less susceptible to lateral drift caused by crosswinds. By retaining a higher impact velocity, bullets with high ballistic coefficients would retain more kinetic energy and be lethal at greater ranges. It was these requirements that drove military thinking in the years prior to the First World War.

=== France – 1898–1932 ===
==== Balle D – 1898 ====
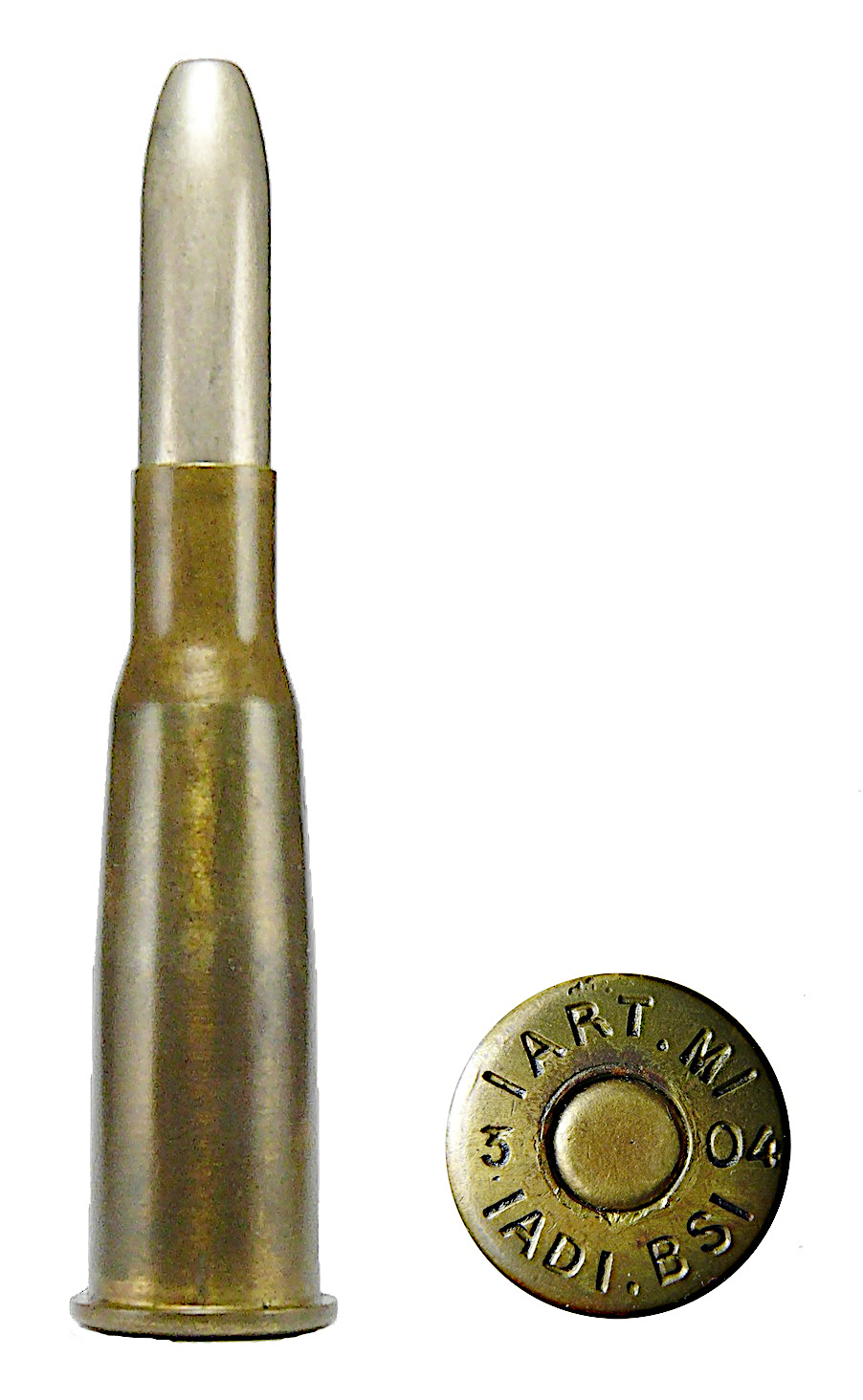
Loaded with 1886 pattern flat-nose balle M.

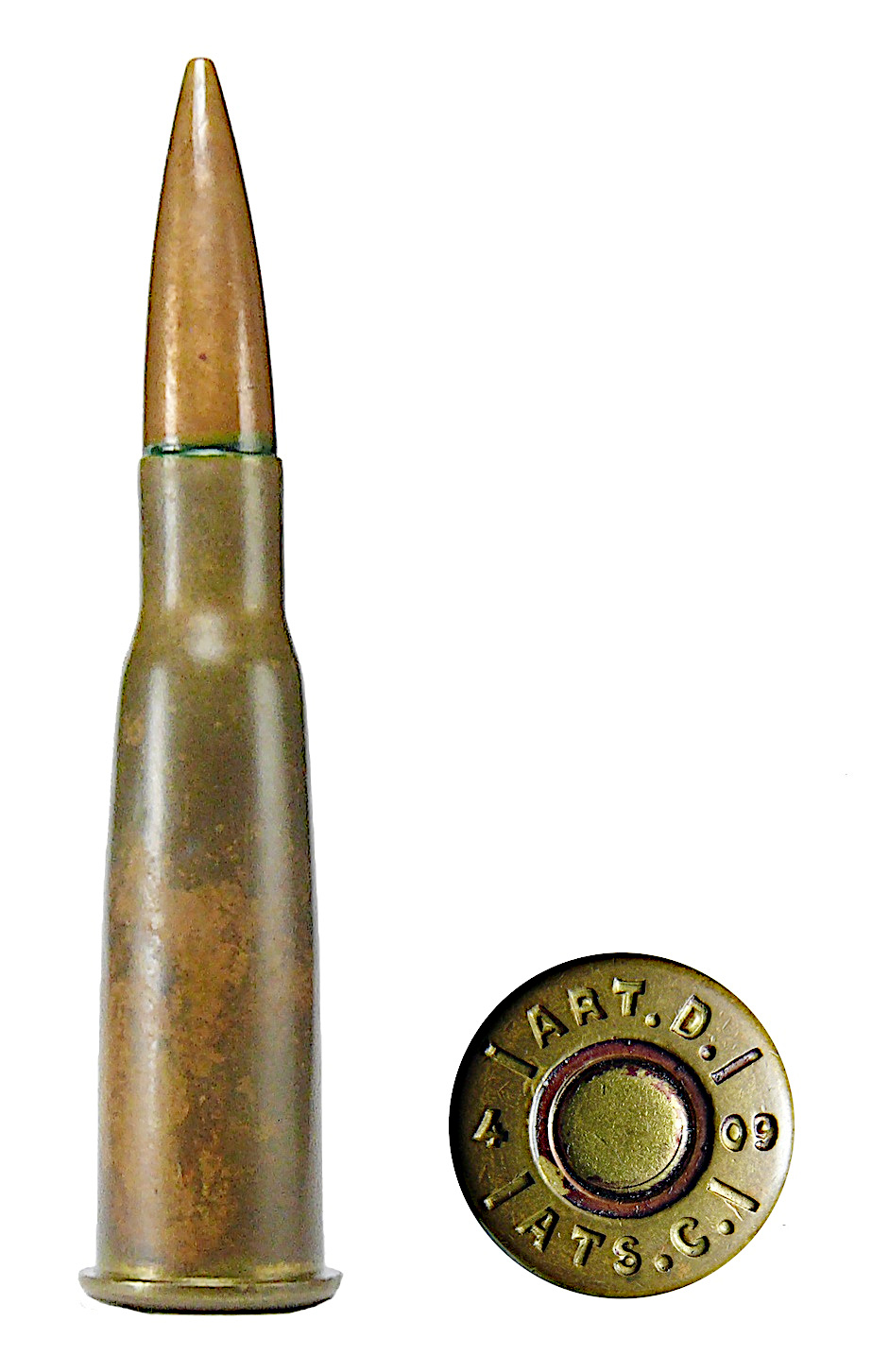
Loaded with 1898 pattern spire point balle D.

8×50mmR Lebel service cartridges

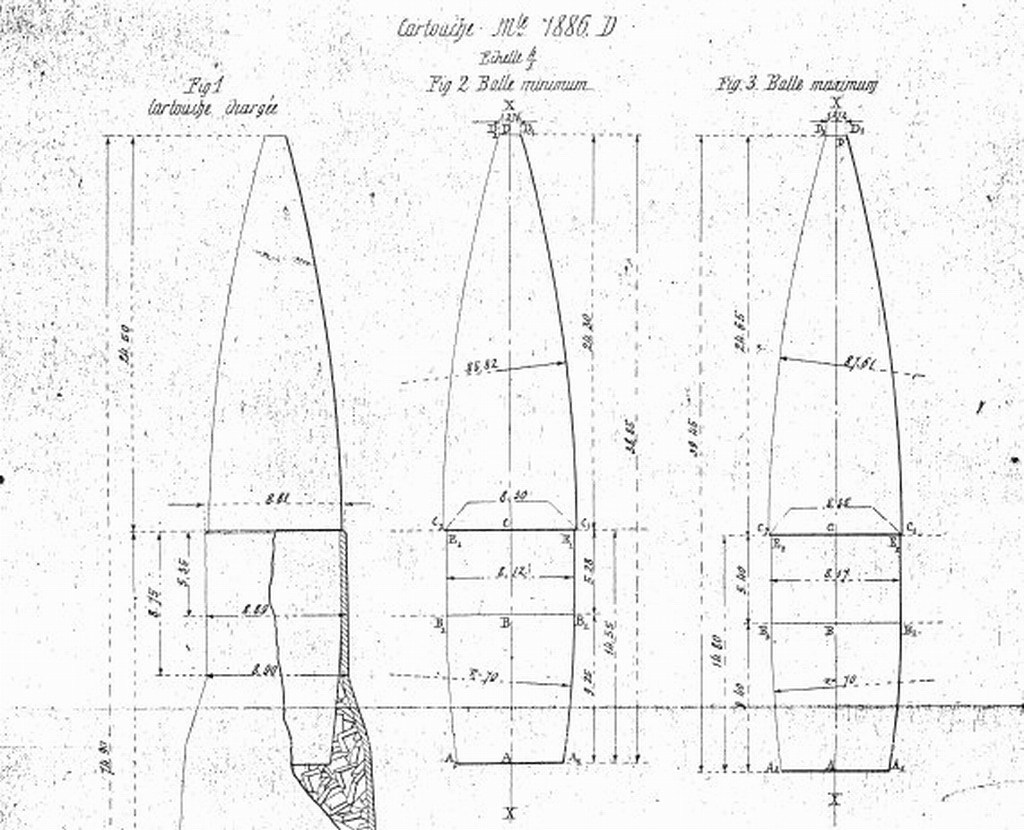
Technical drawings of the French 1898 pattern Balle D bullet

The spitzer bullet design was first introduced in 1898 as the Balle D by the French Army. The Balle D bullet was designed by Captain Georges Raymond Desaleux, in order to improve the ballistic performance of the existing French 8×50mmR Lebel service cartridge of 1886.

The original 1886 pattern 8×50mmR Lebel cartridge was an innovative service cartridge design, since it was the first military cartridge to use single-base smokeless, nitrocellulose based, (Poudre B) gunpowder as developed by Paul Vieille in 1884. The original 1886 pattern 8×50mmR Lebel was loaded with a 15.0 grams (231 gr) cupro-nickel-jacketed lead-cored flat-nosed wadcutter-style Balle M bullet designed by lieutenant colonel Nicolas Lebel achieving a muzzle velocity of 628 m/s (2,060 ft/s).

The new 1898 pattern 8×50mmR Lebel cartridge loaded with Desaleux's new lighter 12.8 grams (198 gr) Balle D brass mono-metal spitzer bullet achieved a muzzle velocity of 700 m/s (2,300 ft/s), providing a somewhat flatter trajectory and a greatly improved maximum effective range. Besides having a pointed nose section the Balle D was also the first military rifle projectile that had a boat tail – a streamlined tapered base – to further minimize air resistance in flight.

Downrange performance

The 1898 pattern 8×50mmR Lebel Balle D spitzer nose profile combined with the boat tail resulted in a ballistic coefficient (G1 BC) of 0.568 to 0.581 (ballistic coefficients are somewhat debatable). Fired at 700 m/s (2,300 ft/s) muzzle velocity the Balle D bullet retained supersonic velocity up to and past 800 m (870 yd) (V_{800} ≈ Mach 1.13) under ICAO Standard Atmosphere conditions at sea level (air density ρ = 1.225 kg/m^{3}) and had a maximum terminal range of approximately 4,400 m (4,812 yd). Even by 21st century standards, 800 m (870 yd) typical effective supersonic range is regarded as normal for a standard military rifle round (see maximum effective rifle range).

1886 pattern 8×50mmR Lebel Balle M load
Distance (m)	0	200	400	600	800	1000	1500	2000
Trajectory (m)	0	0.14	0.81	2.39	5.27	9.83	31.71	75.61
Velocity (m/s)	628	488	397	335	290	255	197	160

1898 pattern 8×50mmR Lebel Balle D load
Distance (m)	0	200	400	600	800	1000	1500	2000
Trajectory (m)	0	0.12	0.54	1.43	3.01	5.60	18.30	44.0
Velocity (m/s)	700	607	521	448	388	342	278	240

The downrange performance tables above show the superior velocity retention of the Balle D compared with its Balle M predecessor
Note: The air density ρ used to correlate these tables is unknown.

==== Balle N – 1932 ====
In 1932, 8×50mmR Lebel Balle N ammunition was introduced, which featured a lead-cored, cupro-nickel-over-steel-jacketed, pointed boat-tail bullet weighing 15.0 g (232 grains). It had been designed to improve the long-range performance of the issued Hotchkiss Mle 1914 machine guns.

=== German Empire – 1898–1918 ===
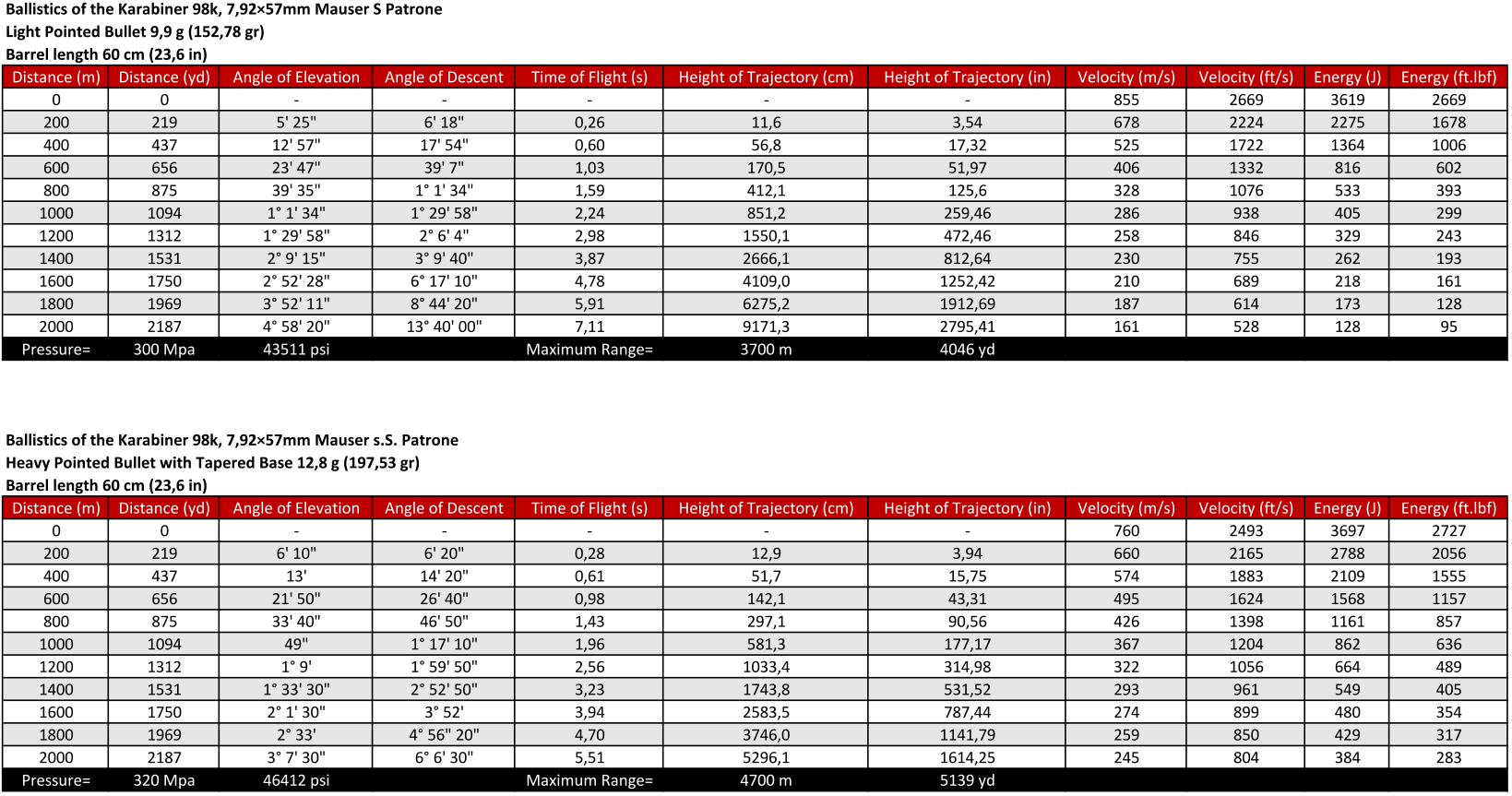
Ballistic tables for the 1903 pattern S Patrone and the further improved 1914 pattern s.S. Patrone fired from a 600 millimetres (23.6 in) barrel

In Germany the Gewehr-Prüfungskommission (G.P.K.) (Rifle Testing Commission) was responsible for improving the accuracy and performance of the 1888 pattern military M/88 ammunition and Germany's weapons chambered for M/88 Rundkopfgeschoss ("round head shot") ammunition like the Gewehr 1888. During a late 19th and early 20th century improvement program tasked with remedying the M/88's propellant compression and excessive barrel (grooves) wear problems, the German ordnance authority began to prefer spitzer bullets by 1898.

==== Geschoß S. – 1902–1904 ====
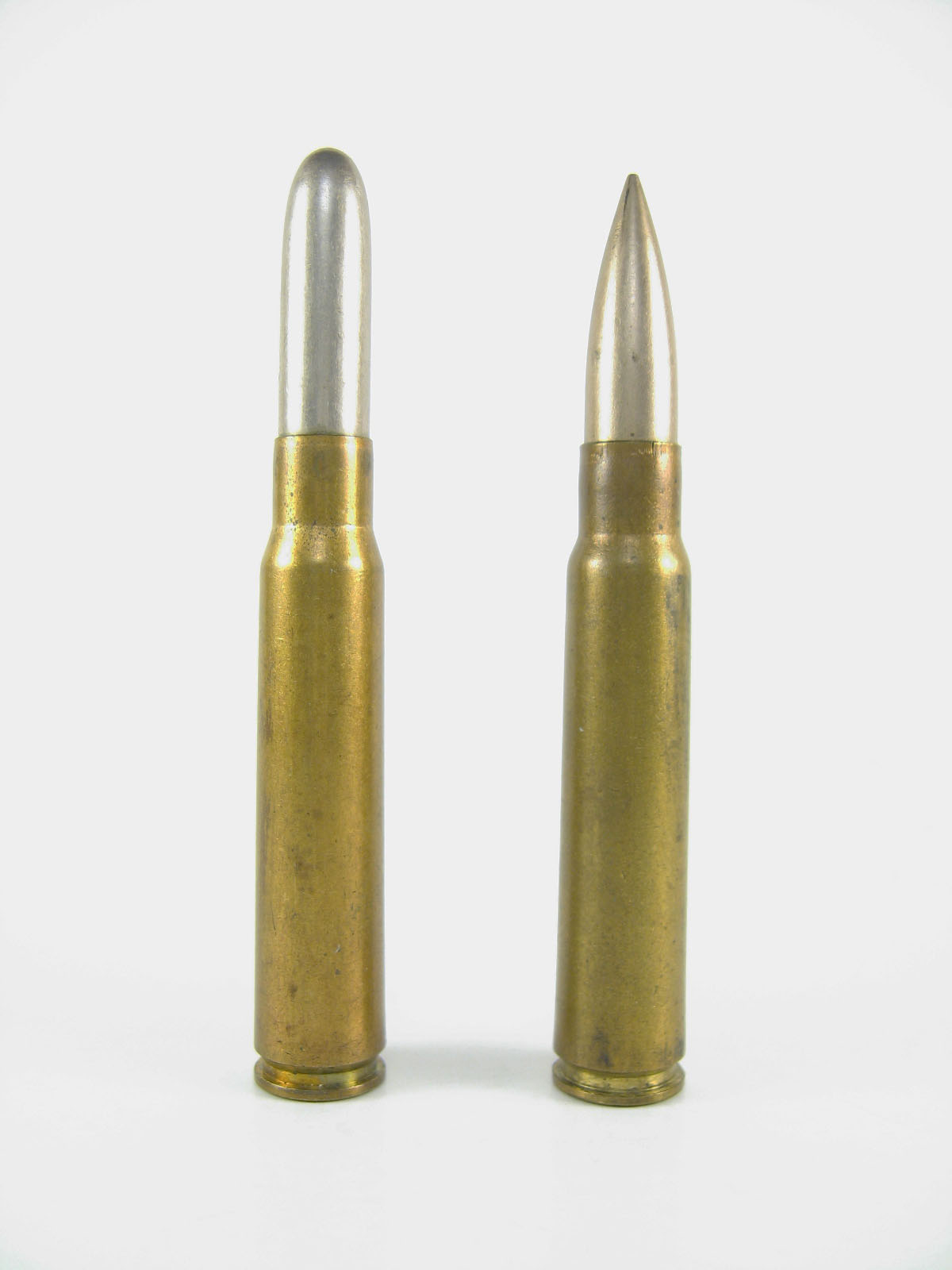
7.92×57mm Mauser cartridges. To the left: 1888 pattern, round nose Patrone M/88. To the right: 1903 pattern, spire point (spitzer) Patrone S..

A new aerodynamic bullet, the Spitzgeschoß or Geschoß S., credited to the independent ballistician Arthur Gleinich, was tested in 1902 and officially adopted on 3 April 1903. After several shape revisions it entered mass production in 1904. The Spitzgeschoß nose was externally pointed like the French design and its shape was patented, but the full metal jacket Spitzgeschoß differed internally.

The Gewehr-Prüfungskommission program resulted in the S Patrone or 7.92×57mm Mauser cartridge, which was loaded with a relatively lightweight 9.9 grams (153 gr) spitzer bullet with a slightly increased diameter of 8.2 mm (0.323 in) that had a ballistic coefficient (G1 BC) of approximately 0.321 to 0.337 (ballistic coefficients are somewhat debatable), along with a dimensionally redesigned chambering and bore (designated as "S-bore") and new double-base (based on nitrocellulose and nitroglycerin) smokeless powder loading, which delivered a greatly improved muzzle velocity of 878 m/s (2,880 ft/s) from a 740 millimetres (29.1 in) barrel.

The S Patrone was adopted by the German Army and Navy in 1903 and had a maximum terminal range of approximately 3,700 m (4,050 yd). The combination of increased muzzle velocity and improved bullet aerodynamics provided a much flatter bullet trajectory, which increased the probability of hitting an individual target at most typical combat distances.

==== Geschoß s.S – 1914 ====
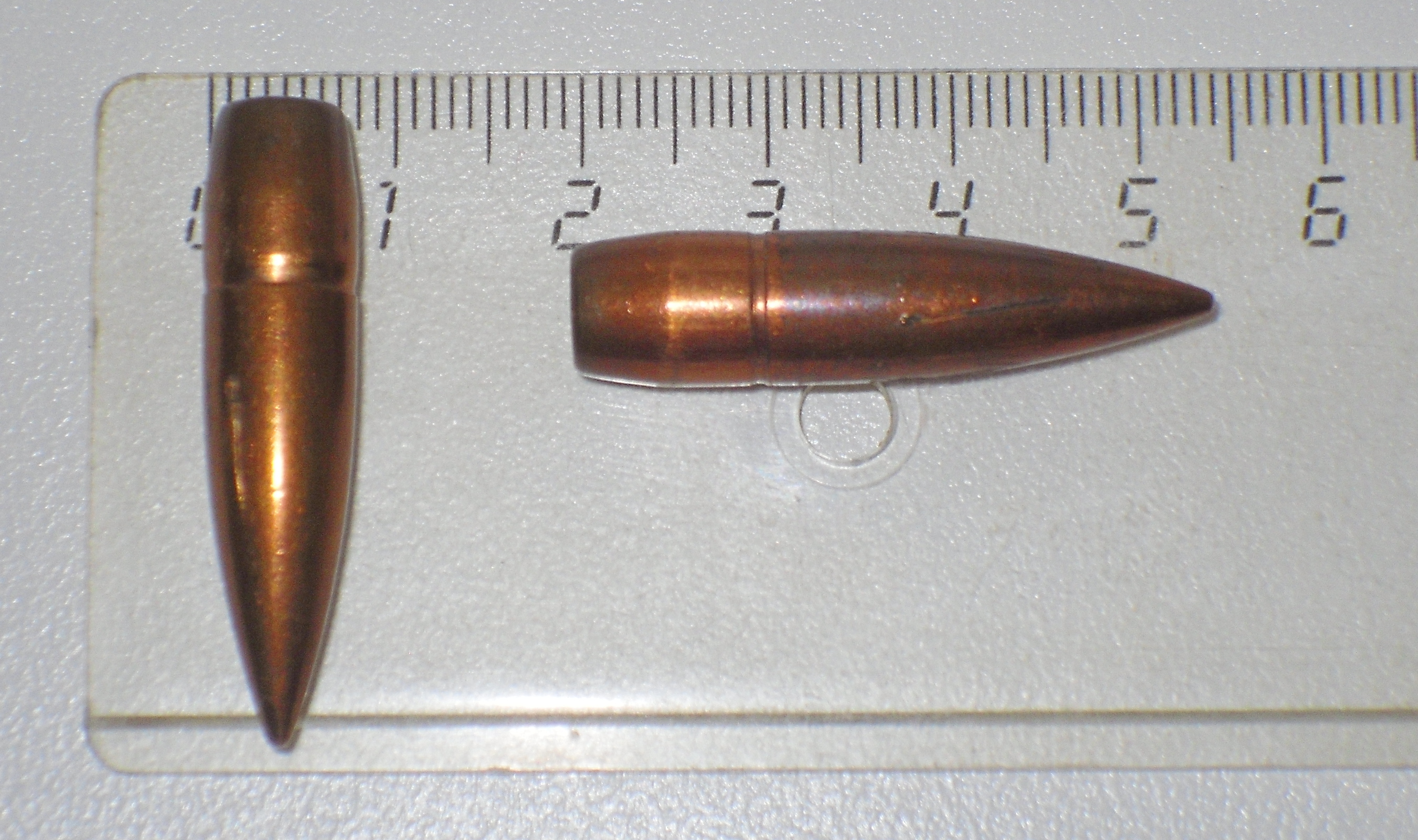
A 1914 pattern Geschoß s.S. spitzer boat-tail bullet.

At the onset of World War I, Germany developed an aerodynamically further refined bullet, the schweres Spitzgeschoß ("heavy spitzer") or Geschoß s.S.). This 12.8 grams (198 gr) full metal jacket spitzer boat-tail projectile had a ballistic coefficient (G1 BC) of 0.557 to 0.593 (ballistic coefficients are somewhat debatable) and was loaded in the s.S. Patrone. At 760 m/s (2,493 ft/s) muzzle velocity the s.S. Patrone had a maximum terminal range of approximately 4,700 m (5,140 yd) and retained supersonic velocity up to and past 1,000 m (1,100 yd) (V_{1000} ≈ Mach 1.07) under ICAO Standard Atmosphere conditions at sea level (air density ρ = 1.225 kg/m^{3}).

From its 1914 introduction the s.S. Patrone was mainly issued for aerial combat and as of 1918 in the later stages of World War I to infantry machine gunners. Fifteen years after World War I the S Patrone was phased out and the s.S. Patrone became the standard issue ball ammunition for the German military.

=== United States – 1906 ===
In 1906, United States ordnance authorities arranged to purchase the production license for the Spitzgeschoß bullet design from Gleinich. Now referred to as a 'spitzer' design, the new 9.7 grams (150 gr) flat base projectile that had a ballistic coefficient (G1 BC) of approximately 0.405 with a cupro-nickel alloy jacket was incorporated into the M1906 .30-06 Springfield cartridge adopted by U.S. armed forces in 1906. The ball, M1906 rounds had a muzzle velocity of 823 m/s (2,700 ft/s) and had a maximum terminal range of approximately 3,117 m (3,409 yd) and can be identified by their silver-colored bullets. The cupro-nickel alloy was found to foul the bore quickly.

Examples of US military bullets, from left: • .30 M1903 bullet; • .30 M1906 ball; • .30 M1 ball; • .30 M2 ball; • .30 M2 Armor-Piercing (AP) bullet; Note: Black tip AP-marking chipped off. Cannelures for crimping the leading edge of the case into the bullet.	The four spitzer bullets used in the .30-06 Springfield cartridge case were loaded with a nearly identical tangent ogive exposed for reliable functioning in self-loading firearms, while the earlier M1903 bullet is positioned to illustrate the longer neck of the preceding .30-03 cartridge.

=== Russian Empire – 1908 ===
In 1908, the Russian Empire adopted a new 7.62×54mmR service round variant loaded with the "L" 9.61-gram (148.3 gr) Лёгкая Пуля (Lyogkhaya pulya, "Light Bullet") spitzer bullet that had a ballistic coefficient (G1 BC) of approximately 0.338. The 7.62×54mmR M1908 Type L cartridge had a muzzle velocity of 865 m/s (2,838 ft/s).

=== United Kingdom – 1910 ===
In 1910, the United Kingdom officially adopted the .303 British Mark VII cartridge variant loaded with an 11.3 grams (174 gr) flat base spitzer bullet that had a ballistic coefficient (G1 BC) of approximately 0.467. The .303 British Mark VII cartridge had a muzzle velocity of 744 m/s (2,441 ft/s) and a maximum terminal range of approximately 2,743 m (3,000 yd).

=== Switzerland – 1911 ===
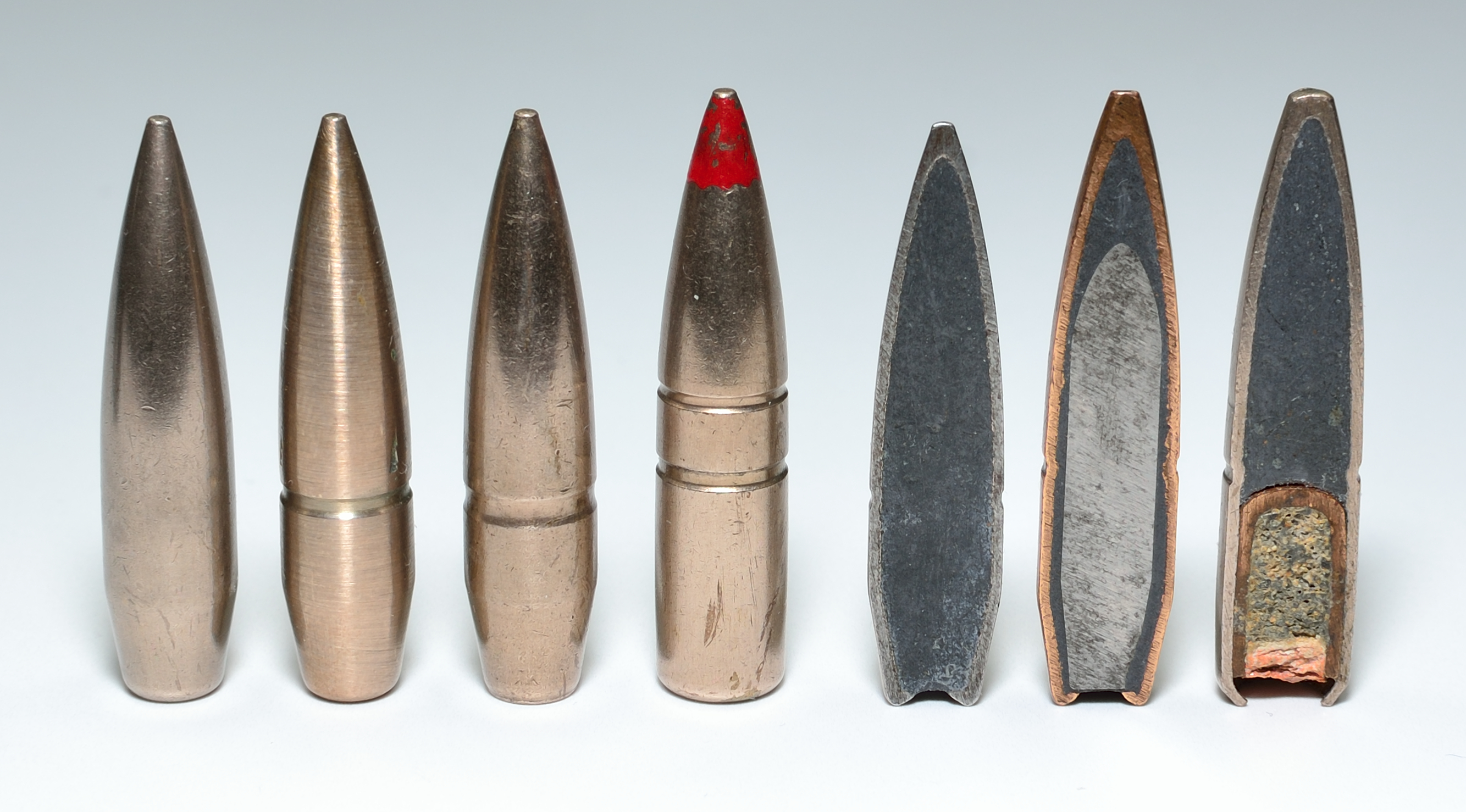
Swiss 7.5×55mm GP 11 Full Metal Jacket, Armor Piercing, and Tracer projectiles

In 1911, Switzerland adopted the 7.5×55mm GP 11 cartridge loaded with a 11.3 grams (174 gr) spitzer full metal jacket bullet. Besides a pointed nose, the GP 11 bullet also had a boat tail to further lower the drag coefficient (C_{d}). The GP 11 projectile had a ballistic coefficient (G1 BC) of 0.505 to 0.514 (ballistic coefficients are somewhat debatable) and had a maximum terminal range of approximately 5,500 m (6,015 yd) under Swiss chosen atmospheric conditions (altitude = 800 m (2,625 ft), air pressure = 649 mm (25.55 in) Hg, temperature = 7 °C (45 °F)) equaling ICAO Standard Atmosphere conditions at 653.2 m (2,143 ft) (air density ρ = 1.150 kg/m^{3}). At 780 m/s (2,559 ft/s) muzzle velocity the standard GP 11 ball spitzer bullet retained supersonic velocity up to 800 m (870 yd) (V_{800} ≈ Mach 1.1) under ICAO Standard Atmosphere conditions at sea level (air density ρ = 1.225 kg/m^{3}).

The GP 11 bullet set off the militaries of countries like Germany, the United States and the United Kingdom at the onset of and after World War I to develop and field similar full metal jacket boat tail spitzer bullets to improve the maximum effective range and long range performance of the full metal jacket flat based spitzer bullet designs they used. The useful maximum effective range is defined by the maximum range of a small-arms projectile while still maintaining the minimum kinetic energy required to put unprotected personnel out of action, which is generally believed to be 15 kilogram-meters (147 J / 108 ft⋅lbf).

=== Kingdom of Spain – 1913 ===
In 1913, the ordnance authorities of the Kingdom of Spain issued a redesigned 7×57mm Mauser cartridge (7mm Cartucho para Mauser Tipo S). It was loaded with a 9 grams (138.9 gr) spitzer bullet fired at a muzzle velocity of 850 m/s (2,789 ft/s) with 3,251 J (2,398 ft⋅lbf) muzzle energy from a 589 mm (23.2 in) long barrel. It had a maximum terminal range of 3,700 m (4,050 yd).

=== Sweden – 1932–1941 ===
==== 8 mm projektil m/32 – 1932 ====
In 1932, Sweden introduced the 8×63mm patron m/32 loaded with 14.2 g (219 gr) spitzer bullets with a boat tail fired at a muzzle velocity of 760 m/s (2,493 ft/s) bullets. The 8×63mm patron m/32 ammunition was not developed as general service ammunition but for anti-aircraft and indirect fire and had an effective range of approximately 3,600 m (3,937 yd) on which the impact energy was 20 kilogram-meters (196 J / 145 ft⋅lbf), and a maximum terminal range of approximately 5,500 m (6,015 yd) when fired from a Kulspruta m/36 machine gun.

==== 6,5 mm projektil m/41 – 1941 ====
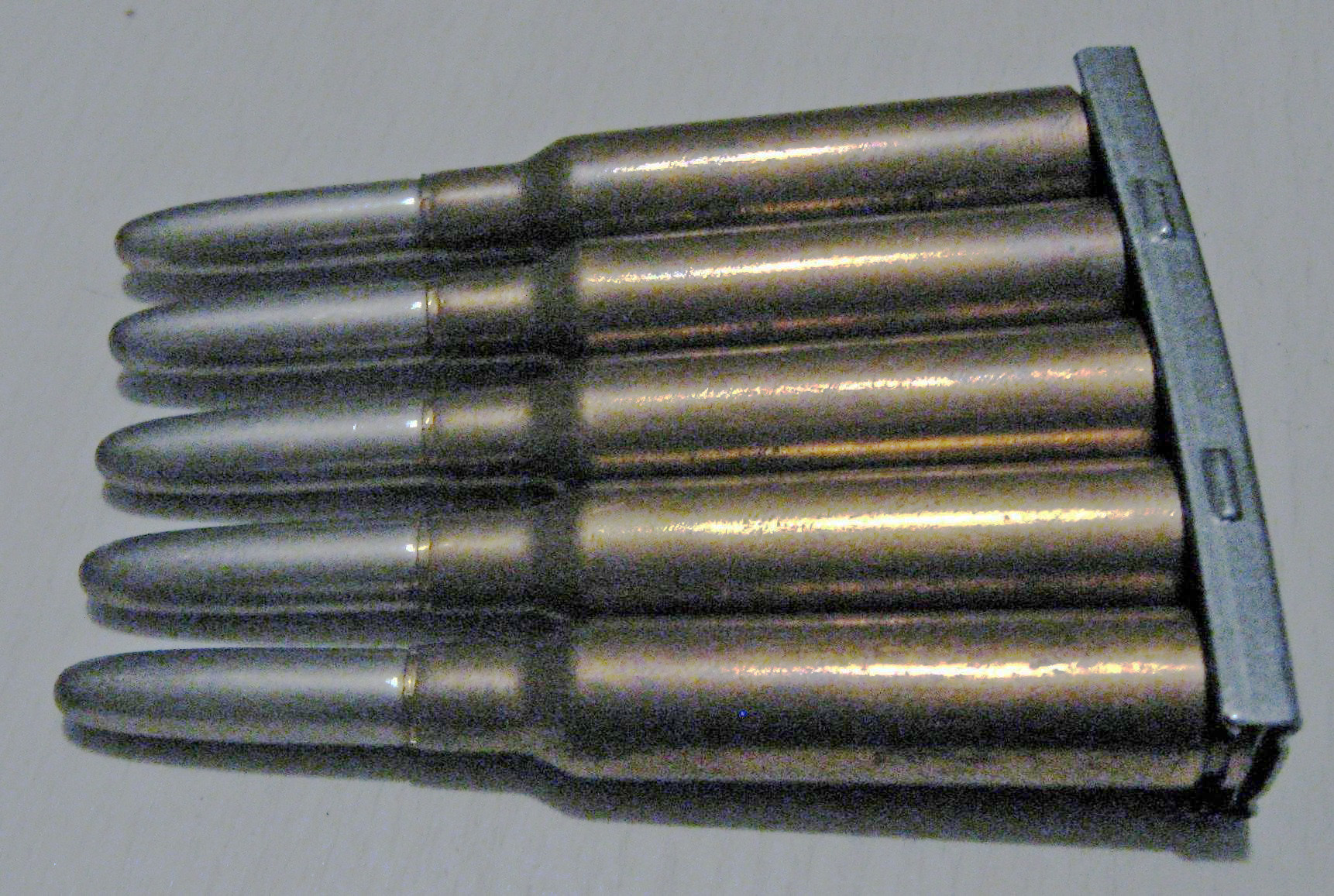
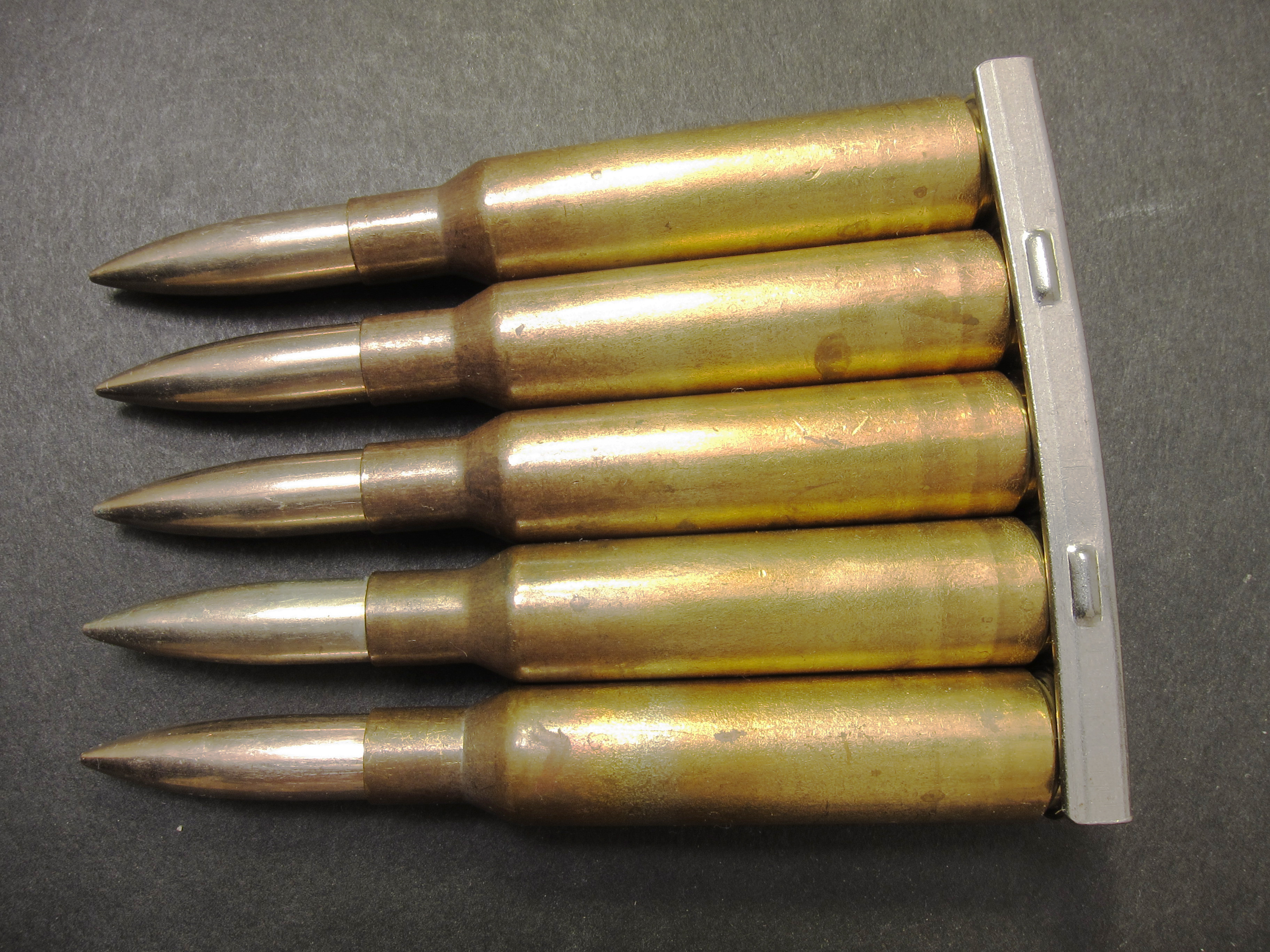
6.5×55mm, to the left loaded with m/94 long round-nosed projectiles, to the right loaded with m/41 spitzer boat-tail projectiles.

Sweden and Norway loaded their 6.5×55mm m/94 service ammunition with a 10.1 grams (156 gr) long round-nosed B-projectile (trubbkula/ogivalkula, "blunt/ogive bullet") fired at a muzzle velocity of 725 m/s (2,379 ft/s) up to the early phase of World War II and Norwegian occupation by German in 1940. From 1941 onwards Sweden, which remained neutral during World War II, adopted m/41 service ammunition loaded with a 9.1 grams (140 gr) spitzer boat-tail D-projectile (spetskula/torpedkula, "point/torpedo bullet") fired at a muzzle velocity of 800 m/s (2,625 ft/s).

== Plastic-tipped bullet ==
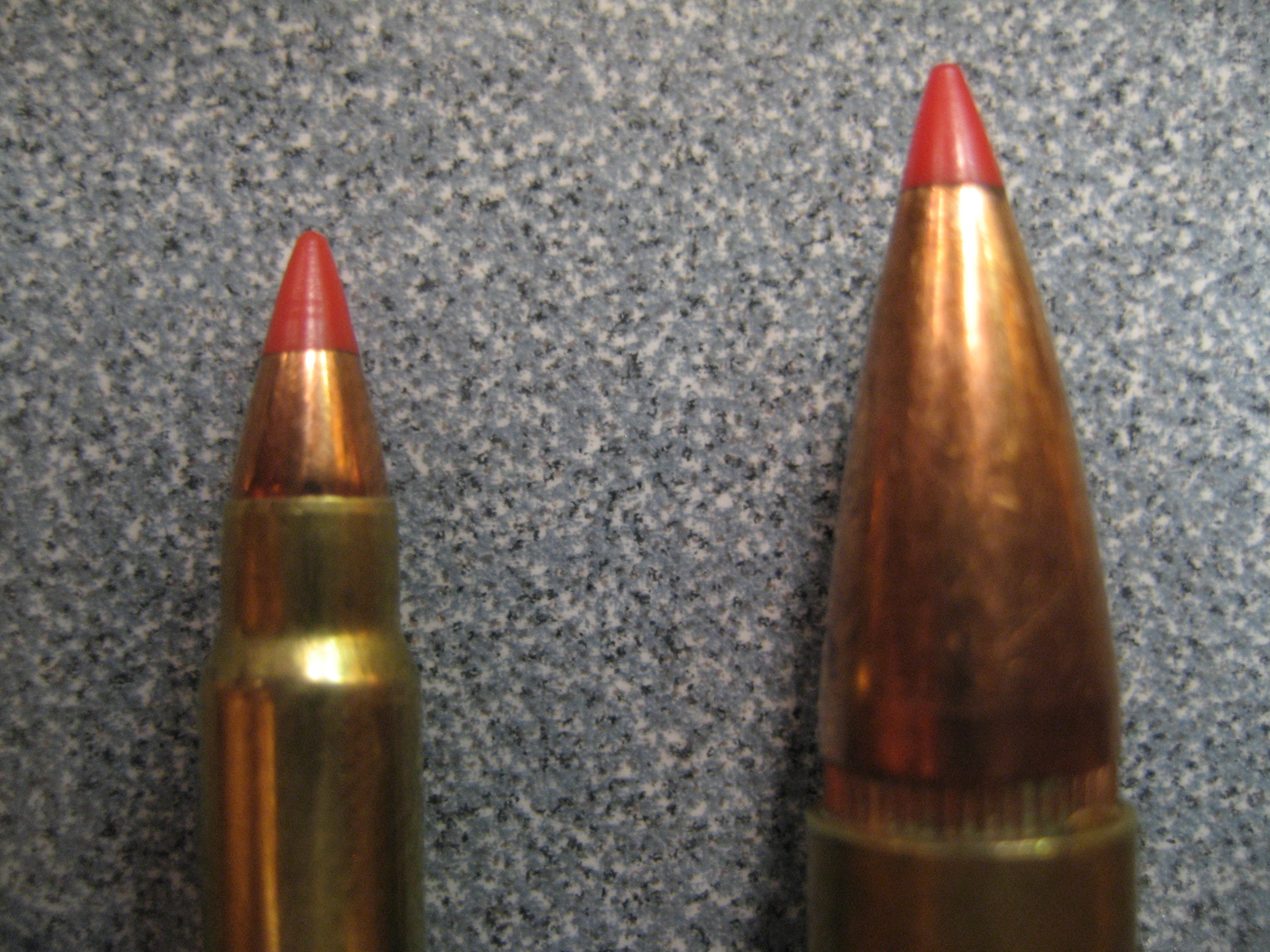
Plastic-tipped bullets. Ballistic tips: Hornady 17 gr. V-Max 17HMR, .308 Winchester

In the 21st century, plastic-tipped bullets are a type of rifle bullet meant to confer the aerodynamic advantage of the spitzer bullet (for example, see very-low-drag bullet) and the stopping power of a hollow-point bullet, by equipping the hollow-point cavity and tip with a plastic ballistic tip (compare ballistic cap). This plastic tip stays rigid during trajectory, giving the hollow-point similar aerodynamic properties to a spitzer projectile, but is crushed upon impact, allowing the hollow-point to petal out as per design.
