= Unsafe firearm and cartridge combinations =

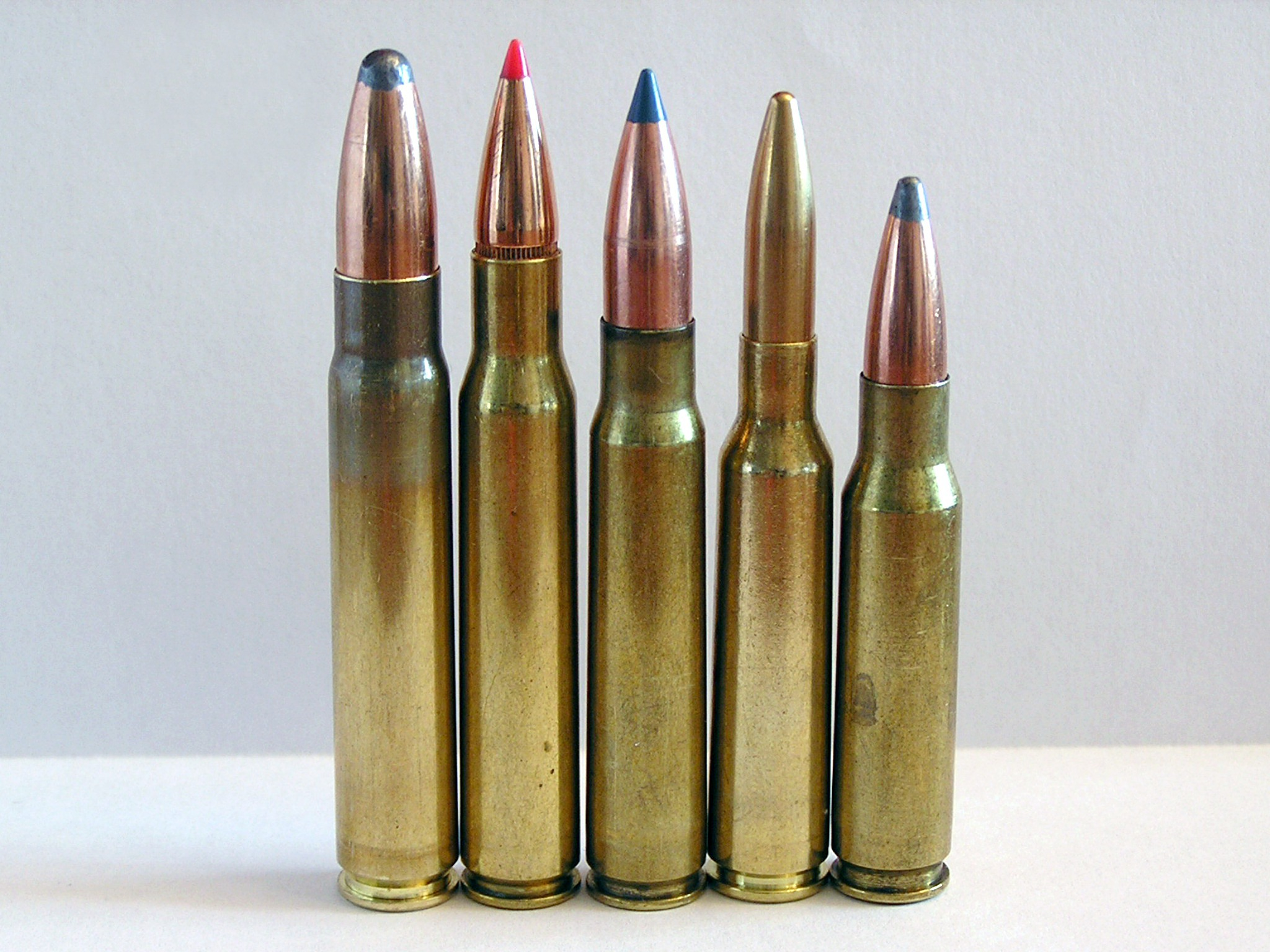
From left: 9.3×62 mm, .30-06 Springfield, 8x57 mm, 6.5×55 mm, .308 Winchester.

Unsafe firearm and cartridge combinations are combinations of firearms and cartridges which can cause an unsafe condition for the shooter when firing.

The unsafe condition can arise due to use of a cartridge intended for another chambering (see SAAMI list below), or using overpressure ammunition in a firearm not designed for such pressures, or using explosive (tampered) ammunition, or otherwise unsafe ammunition.

Another example of an unsafe firearm and cartridge combination is the firing of saboted rounds in firearms with muzzle devices (such as a flash suppressor, muzzle brake, or choke) unless the muzzle device has been specifically designed for safe use with that particular type of saboted ammunition (see Saboted ammunition and muzzle devices below).

== SAAMI listing ==
The U.S. based Sporting Arms and Ammunition Manufacturers' Institute (SAAMI) has listed a number of known unsafe firearm chamber and cartridge combinations which can happen due to mixing of different common cartridges.

Examples include:

- Firing a .22 Long Rifle round in a .17 HMR rifle
- Firing a .357 Magnum round in a .38 Special revolver (the opposite is however is a safe and very common practice)
- Firing a 9×19 mm round in a .40 S&W pistol
- Firing a .300 Blackout round in a .223 Remington rifle
- Firing shotgun shell of the correct gauge or bore, but in a chamber length that is too short (for example a 70 mm shell in 65 mm chamber)

While the table below lists most unsafe combinations known by SAAMI, the list is not exhaustive of all dangerous combinations due to the large number of cartridges.

SAAMI list of unsafe firearm chamber and cartridge combinations
Firearm chambering	Unsafe cartridge(s)
RIMFIRE:	
5 mm Remington Rimfire Magnum	.17 Precision Made Cartridge,.17 Mach 2,.22 BB Cap,.22 CB Cap,.22 Short,.22 Long,.22 Long Rifle,.22 Long Rifle Shot,.22 Winchester Automatic
.17 Hornady Magnum Rimfire	.17 Precision Made Cartridge,.17 Mach 2,.22 CB Short,.22 Short,.22 Long,.22 Long Rifle,.22 Stinger,.22 CB,.17 Hornady Magnum Rifle
.17 Winchester Super Magnum	.17 Hornady Magnum Rifle
.17 Precision Made Cartridge	.22 BB Cap
.22 Short	.17 Mach 2
.22 Long	.17 Mach 2
.22 Winchester Rimfire	.17 Precision Made Cartridge,.22 BB Cap,.22 CB Cap,.22 Short,.22 Long,.22 Long Rifle,.22 Long Rifle Shot
.22 Winchester Magnum	.17 Precision Made Cartridge,.22 BB Cap,.22 CB Cap,.22 Short,.22 Long,.22 Long Rifle,.22 Long Rifle Shot
.22 Winchester Automatic	.17 Precision Made Cartridge,.22 BB Cap,.22 CB Cap,.22 Short,.22 Long,.22 Long Rifle,.22 Long Rifle Shot
.25 Stevens	5 mm Remington RF Magnum
CENTERFIRE SHOTGUN:	
10 gauge (19.7 mm)	12 gauge (18.5 mm)
12 gauge (18.5 mm)	16 gauge (16.8 mm), 20 gauge (15.6 mm)
16 gauge (16.8 mm)	20 gauge (15.6 mm)
20 gauge (15.6 mm)	28 gauge (14.0 mm)
.410 bore (10.4 mm)	Any centerfire metallic cartridge
CENTERFIRE HANDGUN:	
9×19 mm Luger	9×19 mm NATO (Military),.40 S&W, 9×18 Makarov
9 mm Winchester Magnum	9×18 Makarov
9×18 Makarov	9×19 mm Luger,.38 Automatic,.38 Super Automatic +P,.380 Automatic
9×23 mm Winchester	.38 Super Automatic +P,.380 Automatic
.32 H&R Magnum	.32 Long Colt
.32 Smith & Wesson	.32 Automatic,.32 Long Colt,.32 Short Colt
32-20 Winchester	32-20 Winchester High Velocity
.357 Sig	9×19 mm Luger
.38 Automatic	.38 Super Automatic +P, 9×19 mm Luger, 9×18 mm Makarov, 9×23 mm Winchester
.38 Super Automatic +P	9×19 mm Luger, 9×18 Makarov, 9×23 Winchester
.38 Smith & Wesson	.38 Automatic,.38 Long Colt,.38 Short Colt,.38 Special, 9×18 Makarov
.38 Special	.357 Magnum,.380 Automatic
.40 S&W	9×19 mm Luger
.44-40 Winchester	.44-40 Winchester High Velocity
.45 Automatic	.38-40 Winchester,.44 Remington Magnum,.44 Special,.44-40 Winchester,.45 Glock Automatic Pistol
.45 Colt	.38-40 Winchester,.44 Remington Magnum,.44 Special,.44-40 Winchester,.454 Casull
.45 Winchester Magnum	.45 Automatic,.45 Glock Automatic Pistol,.454 Casull
.45 Glock Automatic Pistol	.45 Automatic,.45 Winchester Magnum
.475 Linebaugh	.45 Long Colt,.44 Remington Magnum,.44 S&W Special,.45 Automatic Rim
.480 Ruger	.45 Long Colt,.44 Remington Magnum,.44 S&W Special,.45 Automatic Rim
CENTERFIRE RIFLE:	
5.56×45 mm NATO	.25-45 Sharps
6 mm Remington (.244 Rem)	.250 Savage, 7.62×39 mm
6.5 mm Remington Magnum	.300 Savage
6×47 mm Remington	.25-45 Sharps
6.5 mm Creedmoor	.357 Magnum,.357 Remington Maximum
6.5-06 A-Square	7.62×39 mm
6.5x55 mm	7 mm BR Remington, 7.62×39 mm,.300 Savage
6.5-284 Norma	6 mm Creedmoor, 6.5 mm Creedmoor
6.5-300 Weatherby Magnum	.257 Weatherby Magnum,.270 Weatherby Magnum, 7 mm Weatherby Magnum, 7 mm Remington Magnum,.300 Winchester Magnum,.338 Winchester Magnum
7 mm Express Remington	7×57 mm,.270 Winchester,.30 Remington,.30-30 Winchester,.300 Savage,.308 Winchester,.32 Remington,.375 Winchester, .38-55 Winchester
7×57 mm	7.62×39 mm,.300 Savage,.30-30 Winchester
7 mm Remington Magnum	7 mm Express Remington, 7×57 mm, 7 mm Remington Ultra Magnum, 7 mm Weatherby Magnum,.270 Winchester,.280 Remington,.300 Winchester Magnum,.303 British,.308 Winchester,.35 Remington,.350 Remington Magnum,.375 Winchester,.38-55 Winchester
7 mm Remington Short Action Ultra Magnum	7 mm-08 Remington,.357 Remington Maximum,.454 Casull,.480 Ruger
7 mm Remington Ultra Magnum	.300 Winchester Magnum
7 mm Shooting Times Westerner	.30-06 Springfield,.30-40 Krag,.300 Winchester Magnum,.350 Remington
7 mm Weatherby Magnum	7 mm Express Remington, 7×57 mm, 7 mm Remington Magnum, 8×57 mm,.270 Winchester,.280 Remington,.303 British,.308 Winchester,.35 Remington,.350 Remington Magnum,.375 Winchester,.38-55 Winchester
7 mm-08 Remington	7.62×39 mm
8×57 mm	7×57 mm,.35 Remington
8 mm Remington Magnum	.338 Winchester Magnum,.350 Remington Magnum,.358 Norma Magnum,.375 Winchester,.38-55 Winchester
.17 Remington	.221 Remington Fireball,.25-45 Sharps,.30 Carbine,.300 AAC Blackout
.17-223 Remington	.17 Remington,.221 Remington Fireball,.30 Carbine
.20 Nosler	.221 Remington Fireball,.300 AAC Blackout
.204 Ruger	.25-45 Sharps
.22-250 Remington	.204 Ruger
.22 Nosler	.300 AAC Blackout
.220 Swift	7.62×39 mm
.222 Remington	.25-45 Sharps,.300 AAC Blackout
.223 Remington	5.56×45mm NATO,.222 Remington, 25-45 Sharps,.30 Carbine,.300 AAC Blackout
.224 Weatherby Magnum	.222 Remington Magnum
.240 Weatherby Magnum	.220 Swift,.225 Winchester
.243 Winchester	7.62×39 mm,.225 Winchester,.250 Savage,.300 Savage
.243 Winchester Super Short Magnum	.30 Carbine,.32-20 Winchester
.25 Winchester Super Short Magnum	.30 Carbine,.32-20 Winchester
.25-06 Remington	7 mm BR Remington, 7.62×39 mm,.308 Winchester
.25-45 Sharps	.300 AAC Blackout
.257 Roberts	7.62×39 mm,.250 Savage
.257 Weatherby Magnum	.25-06 Remington,.25-35 Winchester, 6.5 mm Remington Magnum,.284 Winchester, 7 mm-08 Remington, 7×57 mm, 7.62×39 mm,.300 Savage,.303 Savage,.307 Winchester,.308 Winchester,.30-30 Winchester,.32 Winchester,.32-40 Winchester,.35 Remington,.350 Remington Magnum,.356 Winchester,.358 Winchester,.375 Winchester,.38-55 Winchester
.26 Nosler	7 mm Remington Short Action Ultra Magnum,.30-30 Winchester
.264 Winchester Magnum	.270 Winchester,.284 Winchester, .303 British,.350 Remington,.375 Winchester,.38-55 Winchester
.27 Nosler	7 mm Remington Magnum, 30-30 Winchester
.270 Weatherby Magnum	.25-06 Remington,.270 Winchester,.280 Remington,.284 Winchester, 7 mm-08 Remington, 7-30 Waters,.30 Remington,.30-30 Winchester,.300 Savage,.303 Savage,.307 Winchester,.308 Winchester,.32 Winchester,.32 Winchester Special,.32-40 Winchester,.35 Remington,.35 Remington Magnum,.356 Winchester,.375 Winchester,.38-55 Winchester
.270 Winchester	7.62×39 mm,.30 Remington,.30-30 Winchester,.300 Savage,.308 Winchester,.32 Remington,.375 Winchester,.38-55 Winchester
.270 Winchester Short Magnum	7 mm Remington Short Action Ultra Magnum,.32-40 Winchester,.38-40 Winchester,.44-40 Winchester,.44 Remington Magnum,.45 Colt,.454 Casull,.480 Ruger
.28 Nosler	.30-30 Winchester
.280 Remington	7×57 mm, 7.62×39 mm,.270 Winchester,.30 Remington,.30-30 Winchester,.300 Savage,.308 Winchester,.32 Remington,.375 Winchester,.38-55 Winchester
.284 Winchester	7×57 mm,.300 Savage
.30 Thompson Center	.41 Remington Magnum,.44 Remington Magnum,.44 Smith & Wesson Special,.45 Automatic
30-06 Springfield	7.62×39 mm, 8×57 mm,.32 Remington,.35 Remington,.375 Winchester,.38-55 Winchester
.30-40 Krag	.303 British,.303 Savage,.32 Winchester Special
.30-378 Weatherby Magnum	8 mm Remington Magnum,.300 Remington Ultra Magnum,.300 Weatherby Magnum,.300 Winchester Magnum,.338 Winchester Magnum,.340 Weatherby Magnum
.300 Holland & Holland Magnum	8×57 mm,.30-06 Springfield,.30-40 Krag,.375 Winchester,.38-55 Winchester
.300 Pegasus	.300 Remington Ultra Magnum
.300 Remington Short Action Ultra Magnum	7 mm-08 Remington
.300 Remington Ultra Magnum	.30 Remington,.30-30 Winchester,.300 Savage,.308 Winchester,.32 Winchester Special,.357 Remington Maximum,.454 Casull,.480 Ruger
.300 Savage	.338 Winchester Magnum
.300 Weatherby Magnum	6.5-300 Weatherby Magnum,.338 Winchester Magnum
.300 Winchester Magnum	8 mm Mauser round nose magnum,.303 British,.350 Remington Magnum,.375 Winchester,.38-55 Winchester
.300 Winchester Short Magnum	.32-40 Winchester,.38-40 Winchester,.44-40 Winchester,.44 Remington Magnum,.45 Colt,.454 Casull,.480 Ruger
.303 British	.30-30 Winchester,.32 Winchester Special
.303 Savage	.30-30 Winchester,.32 Winchester Special,.32-40 Winchester
.308 Marlin Express	.38-40 Winchester,.41 Remington Magnum,.44 Remington Magnum,.44 Smith & Wesson Special,.44-40 Winchester
.308 Winchester	7.62×39 mm,.300 Savage
.338 Excalibur	.300 Remington Ultra Magnum
.338 Lapua Magnum	.444 Marlin
.338 Remington Ultra Magnum	.300 Weatherby Magnum,.35 Whelen
.338 Winchester Magnum	.375 Winchester,.38-55 Winchester
.338-06 A-Square	.35 Remington
.338-378 Weatherby Magnum	.338 Remington Ultra Magnum
.340 Weatherby Magnum	6.5-300 Weatherby Magnum,.350 Remington Magnum,.375 Winchester,.38-55 Winchester,.416 Taylor Magnum,.444 Marlin
.348 Winchester	.35 Remington
.35 Remington	.30-30 Winchester
.358 Shooting Times Alaskan	7 mm Shooting Times Westerner,.338 Winchester Magnum, 8 mm Remington,.350 Remington Magnum,.358 Norma Magnum,.375 Winchester,.38-55 Winchester,.416 Taylor Magnum
.375 H&H Magnum	.375 Winchester,.38-55 Winchester
.375 Remington Ultra Magnum	.375 H&H Magnum,.375 Ruger
.375 Weatherby	6.5-300 Weatherby Magnum,.416 Taylor Magnum
.375 Winchester	.38-55 Winchester,.41 Long Colt
.378 Weatherby Magnum	.375 Remington Ultra Magnum,.416 Taylor Magnum,.444 Marlin,.45-70 Government
.38-55 Winchester	.375 Winchester,.41 Long Colt,.405 Winchester, 7x30 mm Waters,.30-30 Winchester,.30-40 Krag,.303 British,.375 Winchester,.38-55 Winchester
.416 Rigby	.300 Remington Ultra Magnum,.338 Remington Ultra Magnum,.416 Remington,.416 Ruger
.416 Ruger	.444 Marlin,.45–70 Government,.450 Marlin,.500 Smith & Wesson
.416 Weatherby Magnum	.416 Remington,.416 Rigby,.416 Ruger,.45-70 Government
.45-70 Government	.454 Casull,.475 Linebaugh,.480 Ruger
.458 Lott	6.5-300 Weatherby Magnum
.460 Weatherby Magnum	.458 Winchester

== Saboted ammunition and muzzle devices ==
Saboted ammunition uses an "accelerator" (often made of plastic) to form a seal with the barrel to propel a much smaller projectile in a large bore. An example of such ammunition is a saboted light armor penetrator (SLAP), like for example the 12.7×99 mm round designated as M962.

Muzzle devices, like a flash suppressor, muzzle brake, or choke, but especially muzzle brakes, can cause material buildup from copper, lead, etc. upon firing. In particular, firing of saboted ammunition in firearms with muzzle devices can leave behind residue in the muzzle device upon firing, which can cause an increase in barrel and chamber pressure in subsequent firing. The Hard-Target Interdiction sniper manual contains the following warning on page 411:

Do not fire any style saboted ammunition in a weapon fitted with a muzzle brake, compensator, flash hider or shotgun choke unless you are sure that they are compatible.

— Dean Michaelis, Complete .50-Caliber Sniper Course : Hard-Target Interdiction (2000)

The manual warns that such obstructions may be hard to detect upon visual inspection, and that the obstruction is likely to become dislodged and thus be not be discoverable after a catastrophic failure.

It is also known that other obstructions in the bore, such as ice, mud, or even moisture, can cause similar increases in barrel pressure.

== Examples of common cartridge misuses ==
In Norway there have been several examples of .308 Winchester cartridges being fired in Norwegian K98k surplus rifles rechambered for .30-06 Springfield. In Norwegian military nomenclature the first is called 7.62×51 mm (nicknamed "7.62 kort", literally '7.62 short'), while the latter is called 7.62×63 mm (nicknamed "7.62 lang", literally '7.62 long'). Both cartridges are very common hunting cartridges in Norway. The practice of firing the shorter .308 cartridge means that the case will lack support against the chamber walls in the .30-06 chamber, which will deform the brass heavily during firing. This can be dangerous and cause a case head separation. The phenomena was at one point so common that the brass formed from such firing earned the nickname .30 Idiot, "a cartridge named after its users". The confusion might have arisen due the many German rifles being left behind in Norway after World War II and subsequently used by the Norwegian Armed Forces. The Norwegian coastal artillery chose to keep their K98k's in their original 8x57 mm chambering, while the Norwegian Army and Norwegian Air Force rechambered their rifles at Kongsberg Våpenfabrikk. .30-06 was chosen, as this was the standard of the U.S. Army at that time, but the barrels were only marked as "7.62". In 1954, NATO introduced 7.62×51 mm NATO as their standard cartridge. The sniper rifle Kongsberg M59 was also chambered for 7.62×51 mm. At the same time, 7.62×51 mm was the standard cartridge of the National Rifle Association of Norway, which could cause further confusion. Most of the Norwegian armed forces transitioned to the AG-3 from 1966, but Mauser actions chambered in .30-06 were used by the reserve forces in the Norwegian Home Guard until transition to the AG-3 was started in the early 1970s. Surplus rifles from the home guard chambered in .30-06 continued to be sold to military personnel, civilian shooters and hunters until around 2005.

There is also an example of 8×57 mm cartridges being fired in .30-06 rifles, which produced empty casings humorously nicknamed "7.62×57". In one instance at least four rounds were fired before the error was discovered, and the firearm did not explode.

== See also ==
- Delta L problem
- Lists of gun cartridges
- Wildcat cartridge
