= .25 caliber =

.25 caliber may refer to the following firearms cartridges:

== Cartridges ==
Name	Bullet	Length	Rim	Base	Shoulder	Neck	OAL
.25 ACP	6.375 (.251)	15.62 (.615)	7.67 (.302)	7.06 (.278)	N/A	7.06 (.278)	23.11 (.910)
.25 NAA	6.375 (.251)	18.9 (.744)	8.6 (.339)	8.6 (.337)	8.5 (.333)	7.0 (.276)	24.4 (.960)

=== .25 in (6.5 mm) ===
Name	Bullet	Length	Rim	Base	Shoulder	Neck	OAL
.25-06 Remington	6.541 (.2575)	63.35 (2.494)	12.01 (.473)	11.94 (.470)	11.20 (.441)	7.37 (.290)	82.55 (3.250)
.25-20 Winchester	6.55 (.258)	33.78 (1.33)	10.36 (.408)	8.86 (.349)	8.46 (.333)	6.96 (.274)	40.44 (1.592)
.25-35 Winchester	6.55 (.258)	51.89 (2.043)	12.85 (.506)	10.73 (.422)	9.26 (.365)	7.15 (.282)	64.77 (2.55)
.25-45 Sharps	6.53 (.257)	44.7 (1.76)	9.6 (.378)	9.6 (.376)	8.99 (.3539)	7.2 (.284)	57.4 (2.26)
.250-3000 Savage	6.553 (.258)	48.46 (1.912)	12.01 (.473)	11.91 (.469)	10.51 (.414)	7.26 (.286)	63.88 (2.515)
.256 Winchester Magnum	6.528 (.257)	32.54 (1.281)	11.18 (.440)	9.677 (.381)	9.347 (.368)	6.528 (.257)	40.39 (1.590)
.257 Roberts	6.553 (.258)	56.72 (2.233)	12.01 (.473)	11.99 (.472)	10.92 (.430)	7.36 (.290)	70.49 (2.775)
.25 WSSM	6.541 (.2575)	42.42 (1.670)	13.59 (.535)	14.097 (.5550)	13.826 (.5443)	7.595 (.2990)	59.94 (2.360)
.257 Weatherby Magnum	6.5 (.257)	65.0 (2.560)	13.6 (.534)	13.1 (.514)	12.6 (.496)	7.3 (.288)	81.5 (3.209)

== See also ==
- 6 mm caliber
