= .264 Winchester Magnum =

American rifle cartridge

- .264 Winchester Magnum
- Type: Rifle
- Place of origin: United States

Production history
- Designer: Winchester
- Designed: 1959
- Manufacturer: Winchester

Specifications
- Case type: Rimless, bottleneck
- Bullet diameter: .264 in (6.7 mm)
- Neck diameter: .299 in (7.6 mm)
- Shoulder diameter: .491 in (12.5 mm)
- Base diameter: .515 in (13.1 mm)
- Rim diameter: .532 in (13.5 mm)
- Case length: 2.5 in (64 mm)
- Overall length: 3.34 in (85 mm)
- Case capacity: 82 gr H_{2}O (5.3 cm^{3})
- Rifling twist: 1:9 in (230 mm)
- Primer type: Large rifle
- Maximum pressure: 64,000 psi (440 MPa)

Ballistic performance
Bullet mass/type	Velocity	Energy
100 gr (6 g) Nosler Ballistic Tip	3,510 ft/s (1,070 m/s)	2,735 ft⋅lbf (3,708 J)
125 gr (8 g) Nosler Partition	3,180 ft/s (970 m/s)	2,806 ft⋅lbf (3,804 J)
140 gr (9 g) BTSP	3,200 ft/s (980 m/s)	3,183 ft⋅lbf (4,316 J)
- Test barrel length: 26 in (660 mm); Source: Terminal Ballistics Research

The .264 Winchester Magnum is a belted, bottlenecked rifle cartridge. Except for the .244 H&H Magnum and .257 Weatherby Magnum, it is the smallest caliber factory cartridge derived from the .285 in (7.2 mm) Holland & Holland belted magnum case. It was introduced in the late 1950s and early 1960s with the .338 Winchester Magnum and the .458 Winchester Magnum as one of a family of short-cased 2.5 in (64 mm) belted magnum cartridges developed by Winchester based on the .375 Holland & Holland parent case. It was officially introduced to the public by Winchester in 1959. After many years of dwindling use it began enjoying a mild resurgence in popularity in the mid-2000s among long range rifle enthusiasts and reloaders due to the high ballistic coefficient of the heavier 6.5mm bullets and increasing popularity of cartridges such as 6.5mm Creedmoor, .260 Remington, 6.5 Grendel, benchrest and wildcat cartridges in 6.5mm.

== Design & specifications ==
Winchester had been manufacturing the shortened Holland & Holland cases under a contract for Weatherby for use in their .257 Weatherby Magnum, .270 Weatherby Magnum and 7mm Weatherby Magnum cartridges. The Weatherby cases had been based on Winchester's .30 Super cartridge. This new series of shortened Holland & Holland cases was based on the .375 Holland & Holland case. The advantages of the shortened case were twofold: the cartridge could function through the standard length rifle action as used by the popular .30-06 Springfield and .270 Winchester. It was also close to the efficiency limitations of powders available at the time given the case capacity of the cartridge. The longer, full length .375 H&H case would not have resulted in a great performance improvement due to the powders available at that time. It was similar to the reasoning behind the shortened cases used by Weatherby as DuPont's IMR 4350 was the slowest burning powder available then.

The .264 Winchester Magnum is a cartridge which was standardized by SAAMI, which published recommended specifications for the cartridge. SAAMI recommends a six groove barrel with a rate of twist of one revolution in 9 in (230 mm), a bore diameter of .256 in (6.5 mm) and a groove diameter of .264 in (6.7 mm) with each groove having a width of 0.090 in (2.3 mm). The recommended maximum pressure for the cartridge (piezo) is 64,000 psi (4,400 bar).

== Performance ==
The .264 Winchester Magnum gained a reputation as a very flat shooting cartridge. When introduced, it was first chambered in the Winchester Model 70 Westerner rifle, which was intended for longer range shooting more common in the Western United States.

At present Remington, Winchester, HSM, and DoubleTap Ammunition produce ammunition for this cartridge. Manufacturers offer a 140 gr (9.1 g) bullet at 3,030 ft/s (920 m/s). This ammunition has a maximum point blank range of 300 yd (270 m) when sighted in at 250 yd (230 m). Some ammunition offers premium 140 gr (9.1 g) Nosler Partition and 125 gr (8.1 g) Accubond bullets driven at 3,100 ft/s (940 m/s) and 3,250 ft/s (990 m/s) through a 24-inch (610 mm) barrel.

While readily available factory ammunition for the cartridge is for the most part fairly basic, handloaders can gain a step up in performance with bullets with better ballistic coefficients and weights to extend the performance of the cartridge. For this reason, this cartridge is better suited for shooters who are willing to make their own ammunition rather than those who purchase over the counter ammunition.

== Reception ==
The .264 Winchester Magnum main competition comes from the various 7mm cartridges such as the 7mm Remington Magnum, 7mm Weatherby Magnum, the .270 Winchester Short Magnum, .270 Weatherby Magnum, 6.5mm Remington Magnum and the .257 Weatherby Magnum cartridges in North America and the cartridges such as the 6.5×68mm in Europe. Due to the over crowded nature of the market in which the cartridge competes, popularity has been on the wane. In particular, the 7mm Remington Magnum release in 1962 led to the cartridge's poor reception by the shooting public. The 7mm Remington Magnum shoots almost as flat as the .264 Winchester Magnum but launches a larger diameter, heavier bullet generating more energy than the .264 Winchester Magnum. Furthermore, the 7mm Remington Magnum benefits from a vast range of compatible bullets due in large part to the popularity of the 7mm caliber while the .264 was something of an oddity and a rather new caliber in North America.

Ballistically it is almost identical to the 6.5×68mm (also known incorrectly as the 6.5×68 RWS, 6.5×68 Schüler or the 6.5×68 Express Vom Hofe) and the 6.5×63 Messner Magnum.

The .264 Winchester Magnum is a flat-shooting cartridge capable of taking down many types of game, and one of the most powerful of all .264 in (6.7 mm) cartridges. When loaded with 140 gr (9.1 g) bullets at a muzzle velocity of 3,100 ft/s (940 m/s) it is an adequate round for deer out to beyond 500 yards (460 m) provided that the hunter is capable of such longer shots.

== Background ==
The .264 Win. Mag., like many magnum rounds, can wear out barrel throats more rapidly than lower pressure and lower velocity non-magnum cartridges, especially when fired rapidly, which heats up the steel and hastens throat erosion. Throat erosion is greater in higher chamber pressure overbore cartridges. This was particularly true in the 1950s to early 1960s, with the chrome moly steels almost universally used for barrels then. But recent advances with stainless steel barrels, especially with cryogenic treatment, have extended barrel life considerably with the .264 Win. Mag. and many other cartridges.

While very few production line riflemakers currently offer the .264 Win. Mag. as a factory chambering, the caliber remains popular with some enthusiasts using custom built rifles and handloading their own ammunition, as an internet search shows. As of 2018 and 2019, Winchester is once again producing its M70 bolt-action rifle in .264 Winchester Magnum.

The introduction of Remington's 7 mm Magnum in 1962 almost immediately eclipsed the .264 Win. Mag., even though the 264 Win. Mag. uses an identical brass cartridge case (the neck diameter of either cartridge case can easily be modified to accept the others' bullets by the handloader), it never fully recovered from the competition of the slightly larger-bore cartridge.

The fact that the 7 mm Rem. Mag. thoroughly eclipsed its popularity has been attributed to many causes, the premature "burning out" of barrels as compared to the Remington cartridge often cited. More likely is the fact that hunters had more confidence in the game-getting ability of heavier 7 mm (.284") 150 to 175 grain spitzer-shaped projectiles on big game, as compared to 140 grains being the upper end of pointed .264 bullets.

Conversely, Winchester marketed the .264 as a long range, combination varmint and deer round, although suited for harvesting elk or moose. Unfortunately, the recoil it generates, plus the expense of the sheer quantity of ammo that may be used to shoot pests at long range (compared to pure varmint cartridges like the .222 Remington and the .220 Swift, or the smaller varmint / deer rounds, like the .243 Winchester) inhibited its popularity further. The result was more sportsmen opting for the bigger Remington 7 mm round because it was seen as more effective on a wider variety of big game; rather than a compromise round that could be used for varmints, worked well on whitetail and mule deer, but was borderline for the largest North American big game when the need arose.

In Europe, two of the .264 Win. Mag.'s champions were George Swenson of John Wilkes gunmakers, London, and David Lloyd of Northampton, England. Lloyd built a number of his deluxe Lloyd rifles in .264 Win Mag, mainly for sportsmen seeking a cartridge that would give high velocity performance with bullets heavier than the 100 grains fired by the .244 H&H Magnum.

== See also ==
- List of rifle cartridges
- 6 mm caliber
- 7 mm caliber
