= .338 Winchester Magnum =

Rifle cartridge

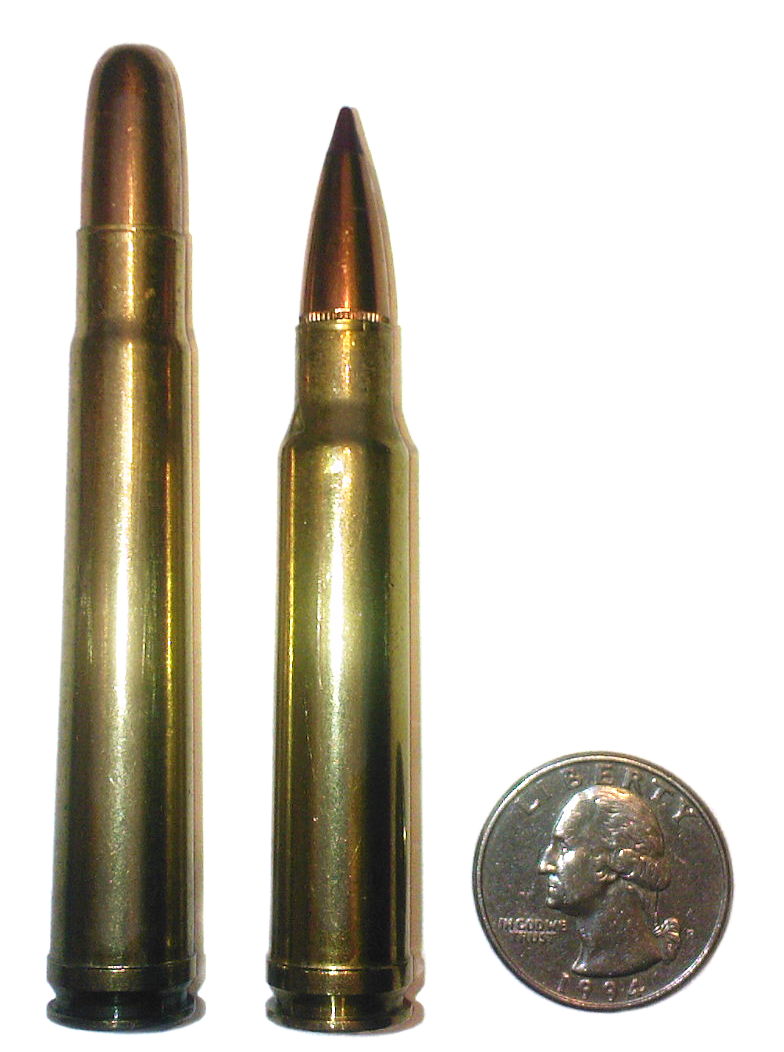
- .375 H&H Magnum (Left) .338 Winchester Magnum (Right) US Quarter for scale
- Type: Rifle
- Place of origin: United States

Production history
- Manufacturer: Winchester Repeating Arms
- Produced: 1958

Specifications
- Parent case: .375 H&H Magnum
- Case type: Belted, bottleneck
- Bullet diameter: .338 in (8.6 mm)
- Neck diameter: .369 in (9.4 mm)
- Shoulder diameter: .491 in (12.5 mm)
- Base diameter: .513 in (13.0 mm)
- Rim diameter: .532 in (13.5 mm)
- Rim thickness: .050 in (1.3 mm)
- Case length: 2.500 in (63.5 mm)
- Overall length: 3.340 in (84.8 mm)
- Case capacity: 86 grain
- Rifling twist: 1 in 10inch"
- Primer type: Large rifle magnum
- Maximum pressure: 64,000 psi

Ballistic performance
Bullet mass/type	Velocity	Energy
200 gr (13 g) SP	2,950 ft/s (900 m/s)	3,866 ft⋅lbf (5,242 J)
225 gr (15 g) SP	2,800 ft/s (850 m/s)	3,918 ft⋅lbf (5,312 J)
250 gr (16 g) SP	2,655 ft/s (809 m/s)	3,914 ft⋅lbf (5,307 J)
275 gr (18 g) SP	2,489 ft/s (759 m/s)	3,784 ft⋅lbf (5,130 J)
- Test barrel length: 24; Source: Accurate Powder

The .338 Winchester Magnum is a .338 in (8.6 mm) caliber, belted, rimless, bottlenecked cartridge introduced in 1958 by Winchester Repeating Arms. It is based on the blown-out, shortened .375 H&H Magnum. The .338 in (8.6 mm) is the caliber at which medium-bore cartridges are considered to begin. The .338 Winchester Magnum is the first choice among professional brown bear (specifically grizzly bear) guides in Alaska to back up clients where a powerful stopping caliber is required on charging bears.

It is also the most popular medium-bore cartridge in North America and has the most widely available choice in rifles among medium bore rifles. The action length is the same as a .30-06, and most major rifle manufacturers in the United States chamber rifles for the cartridge including the semi-automatic Browning BAR Mk II Safari, making it a very powerful combination against charging dangerous game. The cartridge was intended for larger North American big-game species and has found use as for the hunting of thin-skinned African plains-game species.

== Cartridge history ==
The .338 Winchester Magnum traces its heritage to the experiments conducted by Charles O'Neil, Elmer Keith and Don Hopkins with cartridges firing .333 in (8.5 mm) bullets in the late 1940s. The use of .333 in (8.5 mm) bullets may seem odd today but at the time this was the standard diameter of European .33 caliber bullets which were more common than the .338 in (8.6 mm) diameter bullets used in cartridges such as the .33 Winchester. Furthermore, the .333 in (8.5 mm) were available in heavier weights than the .338 in (8.6 mm) bullets. O'Neil, Keith and Hopkins experiments led to the creation of the .333 OKH, which was based on the .30-06 Springfield case necked up to accept .33 caliber bullets and the .334 OKH which used a shortened .375 H&H Magnum necked down to accept the same bullets.

The .338 Winchester Magnum was introduced in 1958 together with the .264 Winchester Magnum and the .458 Winchester Magnum, all of which used a common case design based on the .375 H&H Magnum case blown out and shortened to 2.500 in (63.5 mm), much like the .334 OKH. When the cartridge was introduced, Winchester offered a 200 gr (13 g) at 3,000 ft/s (910 m/s), a 250 gr (16 g) at 2,700 ft/s (820 m/s) and a 300 gr (19 g) at 2,450 ft/s (750 m/s). Sometime later, Winchester introduced the Winchester Model 70 Alaskan chambered for the cartridge. This chambering left little doubt that the cartridge was intended for big heavy dangerous game.

== Design and specifications ==
The .338 Winchester Magnum follows the modern cartridge designs in that the cartridge case features a case with minimal taper so as to maximize case capacity yet providing reliable feeding and extraction. The .338 Winchester Magnum is based on the .375 H&H Magnum, which was shortened to 2.500 in (63.5 mm), blown out and necked down to hold a .338 in (8.6 mm) bullet. The case has a capacity of 86.0 grain of H_{2}O (5.58cm^{3}). The cartridge follows the design of the standard length Weatherby Magnum cartridges such as the .257 Weatherby Magnum, .270 Weatherby Magnum and the 7 mm Weatherby Magnum for which Winchester had supplied basic brass until 1948.

Both the Commission Internationale Permanente pour l'Epreuve des Armes à Feu Portatives(CIP) and the Sporting Arms and Ammunition Manufacturers' Institute (SAAMI) govern and regulate the specifications regarding the .338 Winchester Magnum.

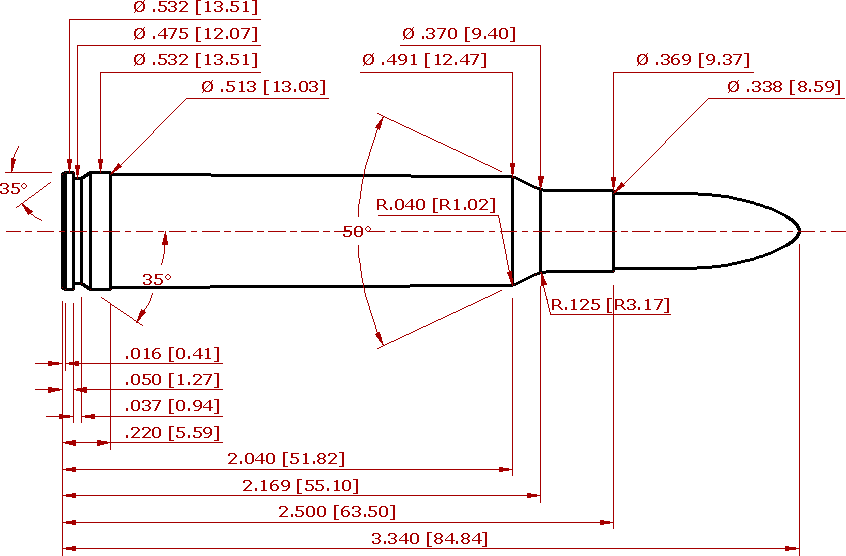

SAAMI and the CIP recommend a 6-groove barrel with a twist rate of one revolution in 10 in (250 mm) of barrel length with a bore Ø of .330 in (8.4 mm) and a groove diameter of Ø of .338 in (8.6 mm), with each groove having a width of .110 in (2.8 mm). The SAAMI-recommended average pressure for the cartridge is 64,000 psi (4,400 bar). The CIP enforces a 4,300-bar (62,000 psi) pressure limit for the cartridge.

== Performance ==
This cartridge is able to push a 225-grain (14.6 g) bullet to velocities of 2,800 ft/s (850 m/s), generating 3,918 ft⋅lbf (5,312 J), providing energy values at 200 yards that are roughly equivalent to the .30-06 Springfield's energy values at muzzle. Bullets are available in a very wide range of designs and weights ranging from 150 to 300 grains. SAAMI pressure level is 64,000 psi.

The .338 Winchester Magnum is capable of launching heavier bullets than the .30 caliber (7.62mm) cartridges. The most common bullets loaded for the .338 Winchester range from 200 gr (13 g) to 250 gr (16 g). Typical bullet weights for factory ammunition are 200 gr (13 g), 210 gr (14 g), 225 gr (14.6 g) and the 250 gr (16 g). Typical velocities for these bullet weights range from 2,960 ft/s (900 m/s) for the 200 gr (13 g) to about 2,660 ft/s (810 m/s) for the 250 gr (16 g) bullet each generating approximately 3,900 ft⋅lbf (5,300 J) of energy. This is approximately 25% more energy generated than the 30-06 Springfield.

Winchester's 200 gr (13 g) Ballistic Silvertip ammunition (SBST338) retains over 1,600 ft⋅lbf (2,200 J) at 625 yd (572 m) and has 1,000 ft⋅lbf (1,400 J) energy at 800 yd (730 m). Winchester's Combined Technologies Accubond ammunition (S338CT) extend the range for these energy levels even further to 675 yd (617 m) and 850 yd (780 m) respectively.

Hornady's 200 gr (13 g) SST Superformance load has muzzle energy of 4,076 ft⋅lbf (5,526 J) @ 3030fps. It maintains 1,899 ft⋅lbf (2,575 J) @ 2068fps @ 500 meters. Hornady's 225 gr (14.6 g) SST Superformance load has muzzle energy of 4,029 ft⋅lbf (5,463 J) @ 2840fps. It maintains 2,025 ft⋅lbf (2,746 J) @ 2014fps @ 500 meters. This is from a 24" test barrel as compared to 27.5" test barrel for a 338 Lapua. Figures would be higher if shot from a 27.5" test barrel but still over 150fps slower than a 338 Lapua if tested with the same length barrel.

The recoil of this caliber is quite heavy, with about 31 ft⋅lbf (42 J) of recoil energy in a 9 lb (4.1 kg) rifle. This is about twice as much as the recoil from an average .308 Winchester. Strong recoil like this can be mitigated with the use of properly designed stocks and recoil pads. By comparison, this cartridge has less recoil than other more powerful .338-caliber rifles such as the .338 RUM, .340 Weatherby and .338 Lapua.

== Sporting usage ==
When the .338 Winchester was introduced there was a general preference for heavier bullet weights between 250–300 gr (16–19 g). However, since that time preferred bullet weights have decreased to weights between 200–225 gr (13.0–14.6 g). This is due in part to the bullet technology available today. Lighter bullets made today are able to hold together and penetrate deeper than heavier bullets of the past.

In North America, the .338 Winchester Magnum is most commonly used for the hunting of larger deer species such as elk and moose. It is quite popular with elk hunters, with bullets ranging between 200–225 gr (13.0–14.6 g) generally preferred for large class 3 game such as elk or moose.

Apart from the larger deer species, the .338 Winchester Magnum is often used for the hunting of and defense against dangerous class 3 game, particularly the great bears including grizzly, polar and brown bears. It is often carried by fishermen, hunters and guides in Alaska and Canada for protection as encounters with these larger bear species can be common.

The .338 Winchester Magnum can be considered a good all-round plains game hunting rifle in Africa. It has also been found to be effective against the big cats where hunting allows for the use of the cartridge.

Some .338 Magnum cartridges (circle size proportional to recoil).
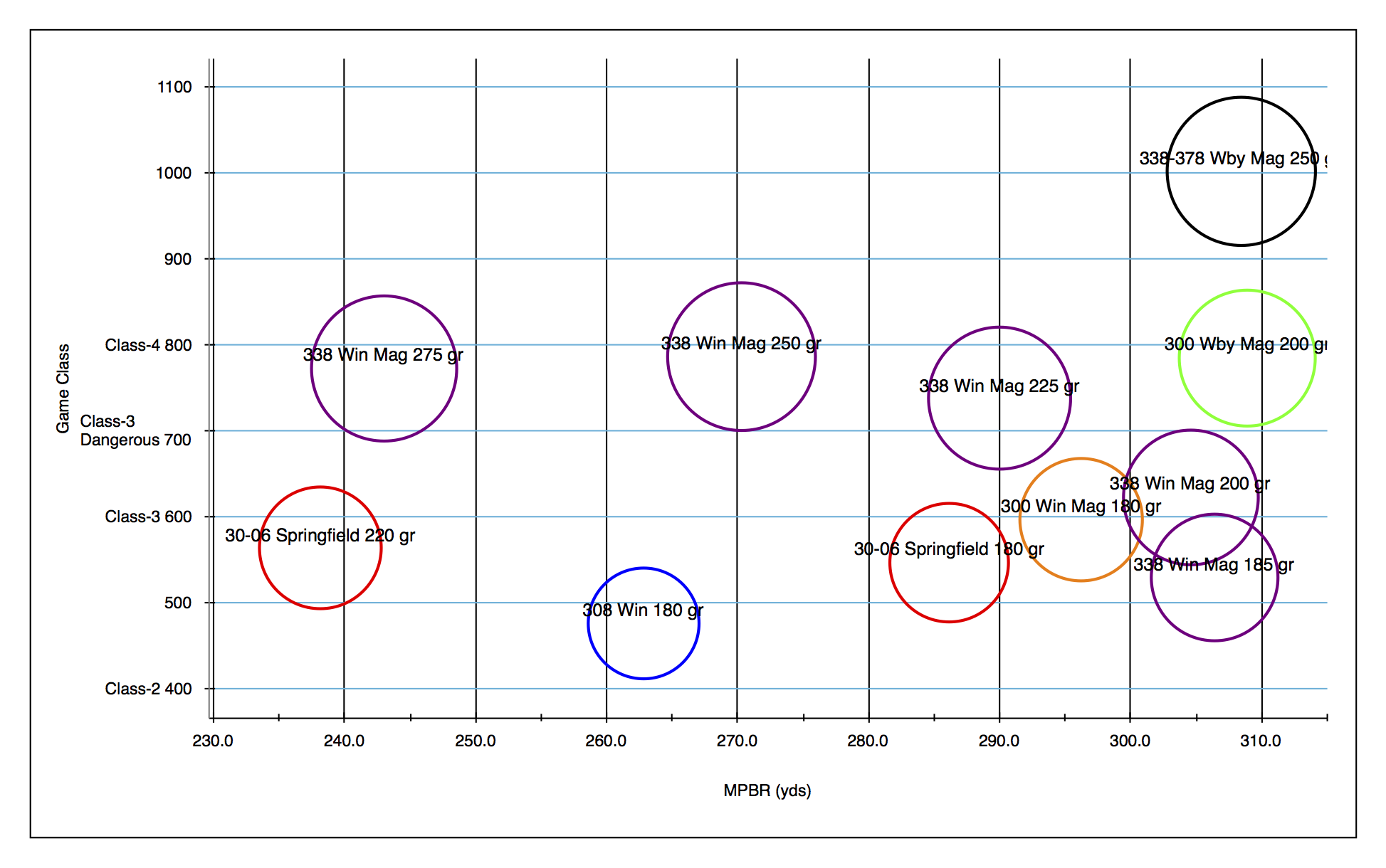
Game Class vs 6 inch Maximum Point Blank Range.

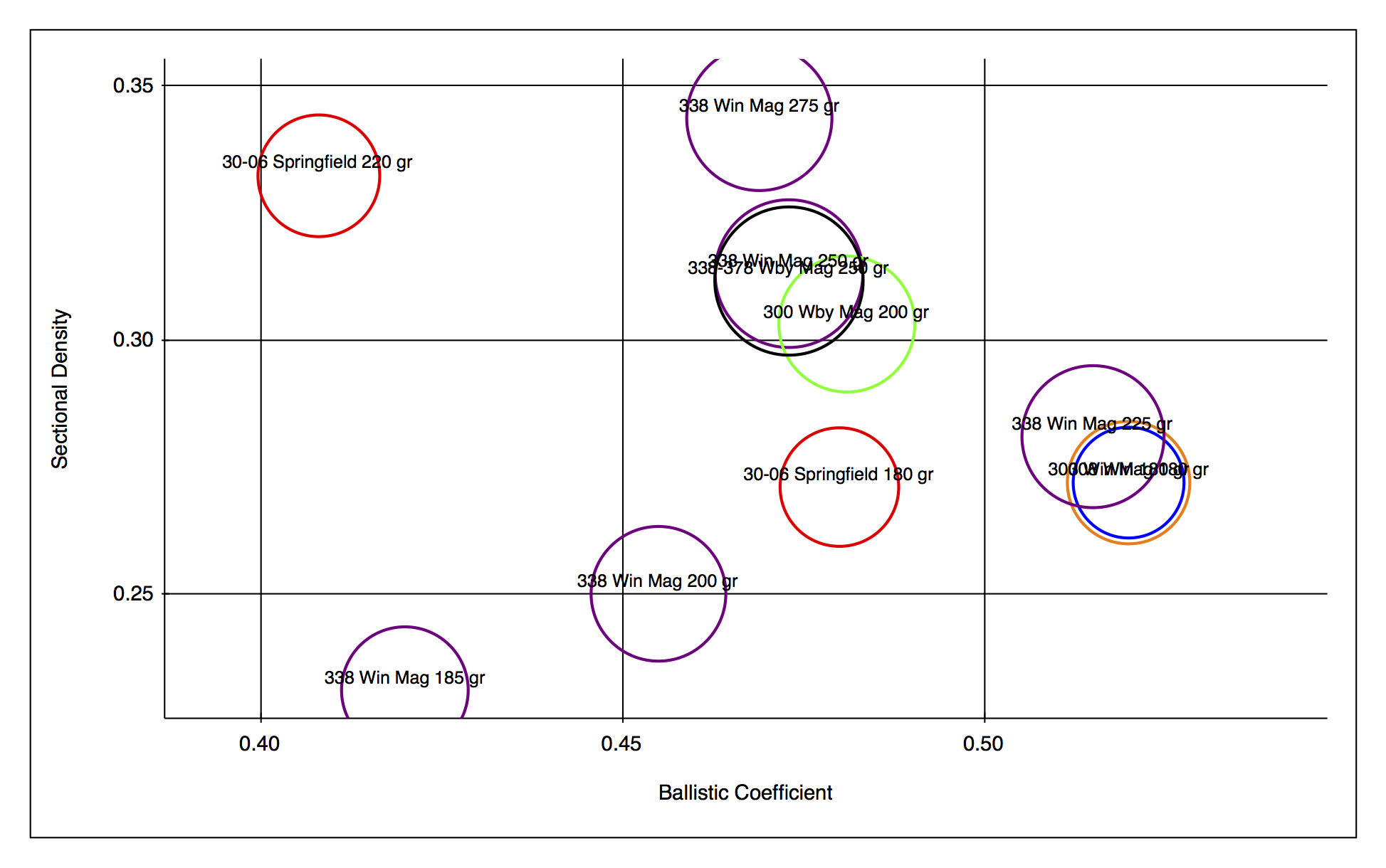
Sectional Density vs Ballistic Coefficient.

== Rifles and ammunition ==
Due to the cartridge's popularity most North American rifle manufacturers offer rifles chambered in the .338 Winchester Magnum. Ruger, Browning, Kimber, Remington, Savage, Weatherby, Mossberg, Howa and Winchester chamber the cartridge in several product lines. Almost all custom rifle makers in the United States and Canada produce .338 Winchester rifles. In European rifle makers Blaser, Mauser, Sako and Tikka also manufacture rifles for this cartridge. The large number of rifle choices available in the .338 Winchester Magnum offers the rifleman a greater choice in available rifles.

All North American ammunition makers offer several loadings of the .338 Winchester Magnum to the public for sale. At this point in time Federal has six in their Vital-Shok and Fusion ammunition lines, Hornady has five, including four in their Superformance ammunition which is putting an end to the light magnum and heavy magnum line of ammo but adds up to 200 ft/s (61 m/s) more without added recoil or muzzle blast. The 185 gr. GMX (gilding metal expanding) round has the following performance: 3,080 ft/s (940 m/s) at the muzzle, 2,850 ft/s (870 m/s) at 100 yards, 3,896 ft⋅lbf (5,282 J) of kinetic energy at the muzzle and 3,337 ft⋅lbf (4,524 J) at 100 yards. 200 gr. Remington and Winchester offer four loadings each for the cartridge. Several smaller ammunition including Cor-Bon and Double Tap also manufacture loaded ammunition.

== See also ==
- 8 mm caliber
- List of rifle cartridges
- Sectional density
- Table of handgun and rifle cartridges
