= 7mm Remington cartridges =

7 mm Remington cartridges are all rifle cartridges with bullets of 7 millimetres (0.28 in) diameter developed and sold by Remington.

These cartridges include:

- .280 Remington (7mm Express Remington)
- 7mm BR Remington (Bench Rest)
- 7mm Remington Magnum
- 7mm Remington Ultra Magnum (RUM)
- 7mm Remington Short Action Ultra Magnum (SAUM)
- 7mm-08 Remington

== See also ==
- 7mm Shooting Times Westerner, standardized by Remington but originated as a wildcat
- 7mm caliber for other cartridges of this caliber
- List of rifle cartridges
