= 7mm Remington Ultra Magnum =

Rifle cartridge

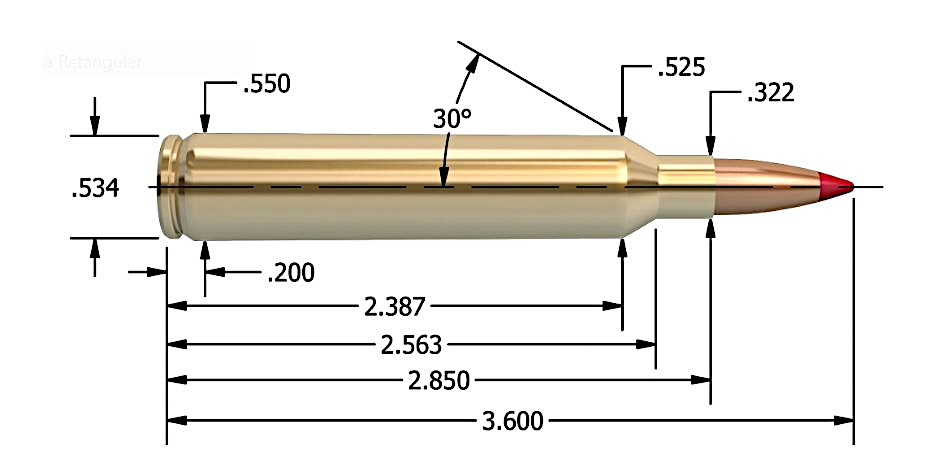
- Type: Rifle
- Place of origin: United States

Production history
- Designer: Remington
- Designed: 2002

Specifications
- Parent case: .300 Remington Ultra Magnum
- Case type: Beltless, rebated, bottleneck
- Bullet diameter: .284 in (7.2 mm)
- Neck diameter: .317 in (8.1 mm)
- Shoulder diameter: .5250 in (13.34 mm)
- Base diameter: .5500 in (13.97 mm)
- Rim diameter: .532 in (13.5 mm)
- Case length: 2.850 in (72.4 mm)
- Overall length: 3.600 in (91.4 mm)
- Case capacity: 108.1 gr H_{2}O (7.00 cm^{3})
- Rifling twist: 1-9 1/4"
- Primer type: Large rifle magnum

Ballistic performance
Bullet mass/type	Velocity	Energy
140 gr (9 g) PSP Bonded	3,425 ft/s (1,044 m/s)	3,646 ft⋅lbf (4,943 J)
150 gr (10 g) PSP Bonded	3,325 ft/s (1,013 m/s)	3,682 ft⋅lbf (4,992 J)
175 gr (11 g) PSP A-Frame	3,025 ft/s (922 m/s)	3,555 ft⋅lbf (4,820 J)
- Test barrel length: 26"

The 7mm Remington Ultra Magnum or 7mm RUM is a 7mm rifle cartridge introduced by Remington Arms in 2001.

== Overview ==
The 7mm RUM was created using the .404 Jeffery case which was also used to develop the .375 RUM .300 RUM, and .338 RUM. By necking down the .300 RUM to suit the .284 or 7mm projectile, Remington produced a non-belted case with a head diameter that is somewhat larger than the belt diameter of the original belted numbers. The resulting case has significantly more capacity than any conventional belted magnum. Compared to the 7mm Remington Magnum, top 7mm RUM loads deliver 25% more energy at 300 yards. Such performance demands a price and in this case, that is a large muzzle blast, sharp recoil and short barrel life.

The 7mm Ultra Magnum boasts the largest case of any commercial 7mm cartridge. The 7mm Ultra Magnum (7mmx72) is a different cartridge than the similarly named 7mm Short Action Ultra Magnum cartridge (7mmx51). The two are not interchangeable.

== See also ==
- List of rifle cartridges
- Table of handgun and rifle cartridges
- 7 mm caliber
