= .338 Edge =

Rifle cartridge

- Type: Rifle
- Place of origin: USA

Production history
- Designer: Shawn Carlock
- Designed: 2001

Specifications
- Parent case: .300 Remington Ultra Magnum/.404 Jeffery
- Case type: Rimless, bottleneck
- Bullet diameter: .338 in (8.6 mm)
- Neck diameter: .371 in (9.4 mm)
- Shoulder diameter: .525 in (13.3 mm)
- Base diameter: .550 in (14.0 mm)
- Rim diameter: .534 in (13.6 mm)
- Case length: 2.850 in (72.4 mm)
- Overall length: 3.600 in (91.4 mm)
- Case capacity: 122.5 gr H_{2}O (7.94 cm^{3})
- Primer type: Large rifle magnum

338 Edge (.338/300 Ultra Mag, .338 Ultra Cat) is a Wildcat rifle cartridge based on the .300 Remington Ultra Magnum round necked up to accept 0.338" diameter bullets. It is gaining popularity as a long-range cartridge due to the wide availability of 0.338" projectiles that have a high ballistic coefficient. For instance, the 300-grain (19 g) Sierra Match King has a ballistic coefficient of 0.765 and is a popular choice for 338 Edge shooters.

== Design ==
The 338 Edge is similar in ballistics to the .338 Lapua Magnum, but can be chambered in a regular magnum action without modification, making it an attractive cartridge for shooters looking for the high performance of .338 Lapua Magnum without requiring a special or custom action.

The name "338 Edge" was coined by Shawn Carlock during his work with the wildcat in 2001 in order to distinguish the cartridge from the (then new) slightly shorter 338 Remington Ultra Magnum.

Velocities in the 338 Edge are high, and the recoil can be substantial enough to make a rifle painful to shoot without a recoil reducing device such as a muzzle brake or suppressor. Recoil is approximately twice that of the popular .30-06 cartridge, for a given weight rifle.

== See also ==
- Firearms
- List of rifle cartridges
- 8 mm caliber
