= Overbore =

Type of bullet cartridge

Overbore cartridges are those with a relatively large case volume or case capacity, coupled with a relatively small diameter bullet.

The case volume or case capacity and barrel bore area can be mathematically related to obtain a case volume to bore area ratio in metric or imperial units.

${O_{ratio}} = \frac{Volume_{case}}{Area_{bore}}$

where:

- $Volume_{case}$ = the cartridge case internal volume or case capacity (in ml or (for non-metric users) grains of water)
- $Area_{bore}$ = barrel bore cross section area (in cm^{2} or in^{2})

The higher the O_{ratio} result, the more overbore a cartridge will be. As the ratio is expressed in units of length, relatively high O_{ratio} is a good predictor of suitability for relatively long barreled guns.

O_{ratio} is also used to predict barrel life in cartridges of the same caliber, but not of different calibres, since the ratio is an extensive quantity that does not correlate to temperature or pressure (e.g. a .50 caliber straight-wall cartridge (.500 Bushwhacker) may have the same overbore as a necked down .17 caliber bottleneck cartridge (.17 Remington)).

== Comparative index for various rifle cartridges ==
Chambering	Case capacity (ml / cm^{3})	A_{bore} (cm^{2})	O_{ratio} (cm)
.30 Carbine	1.36	0.4740	2.87
7.92×33mm Kurz	2.22	0.5178	4.29
7.62×39mm	2.31	0.4799	4.81
7.62×45mm	2.79	0.4749	5.87
5.45×39mm	1.75	0.2399	7.29
.223 Remington / 5.56×45mm NATO	1.87	0.2503	7.47
.303 British	3.64	0.4807	7.57
9.3×62mm	5.06	0.6632	7.63
7.65×53mm Mauser	3.70	0.4836	7.65
.308 Winchester / 7.62×51mm NATO	3.64	0.4751	7.66
7.92×57mm Mauser	4.09	0.5178	7.90
7.5×54mm French	3.76	0.4717	7.97
5.8×42mm	2.11	0.2642	7.99
8mm Lebel	4.28	0.5240	8.16
6mm Norma BR	2.45	0.2952	8.30
9.3×64mm Brenneke	5.71	0.6632	8.61
7.62×54mmR	4.16	0.4799	8.67
.375 Holland & Holland Magnum	6.18	0.7016	8.81
6.5×47mm Lapua	3.11	0.3459	8.99
7.5×55mm Swiss GP 11	4.22	0.4633	9.11
.30-06 Springfield	4.42	0.4755	9.30
7×57mm	3.90	0.4041	9.65
6.5mm Creedmoor	3.40	0.3466	9.81
.300 Winchester Short Magnum	4.99	0.4752	10.50
8×68mm S	5.58	0.5178	10.78
6.5×55mm	3.75	0.3436	10.91
7×64mm	4.48	0.4029	11.12
.243 Winchester	3.51	0.2925	12.00
.338 Norma Magnum	6.95	0.5689	12.22
.300 Winchester Magnum	5.93	0.4732	12.53
.338 Lapua Magnum	7.40	0.5686	13.01
7mm Remington Magnum	5.31	0.4039	13.15
.300 Norma Magnum	6.75	0.4751	14.21
.50 BMG	18.97	1.2963	14.63
.300 Remington Ultra Magnum	7.14	0.4740	15.06
.300 Lapua Magnum	7.34	0.4751	15.45
.257 Weatherby Magnum	5.45	0.3307	16.48
.30-378 Weatherby Magnum	8.64	0.4748	18.20
6.5-300 Weatherby Magnum	6.36	0.3452	18.42
14.5×114mm	42.53	1.6513	25.76

The bore cross section areas "Q" used in the calculations were taken from the appropriate C.I.P. data sheets.

The intermediate cartridges .30 Carbine, 7.92×33mm Kurz, 7.62×39mm, 7.62×45mm, 5.45×39mm, .223 Remington/5.56×45mm NATO and 5.8×42mm stand out as having relatively low sub 8 O_{ratio's}.
