= 6.5-300 Weatherby Magnum =

Rifle cartridge

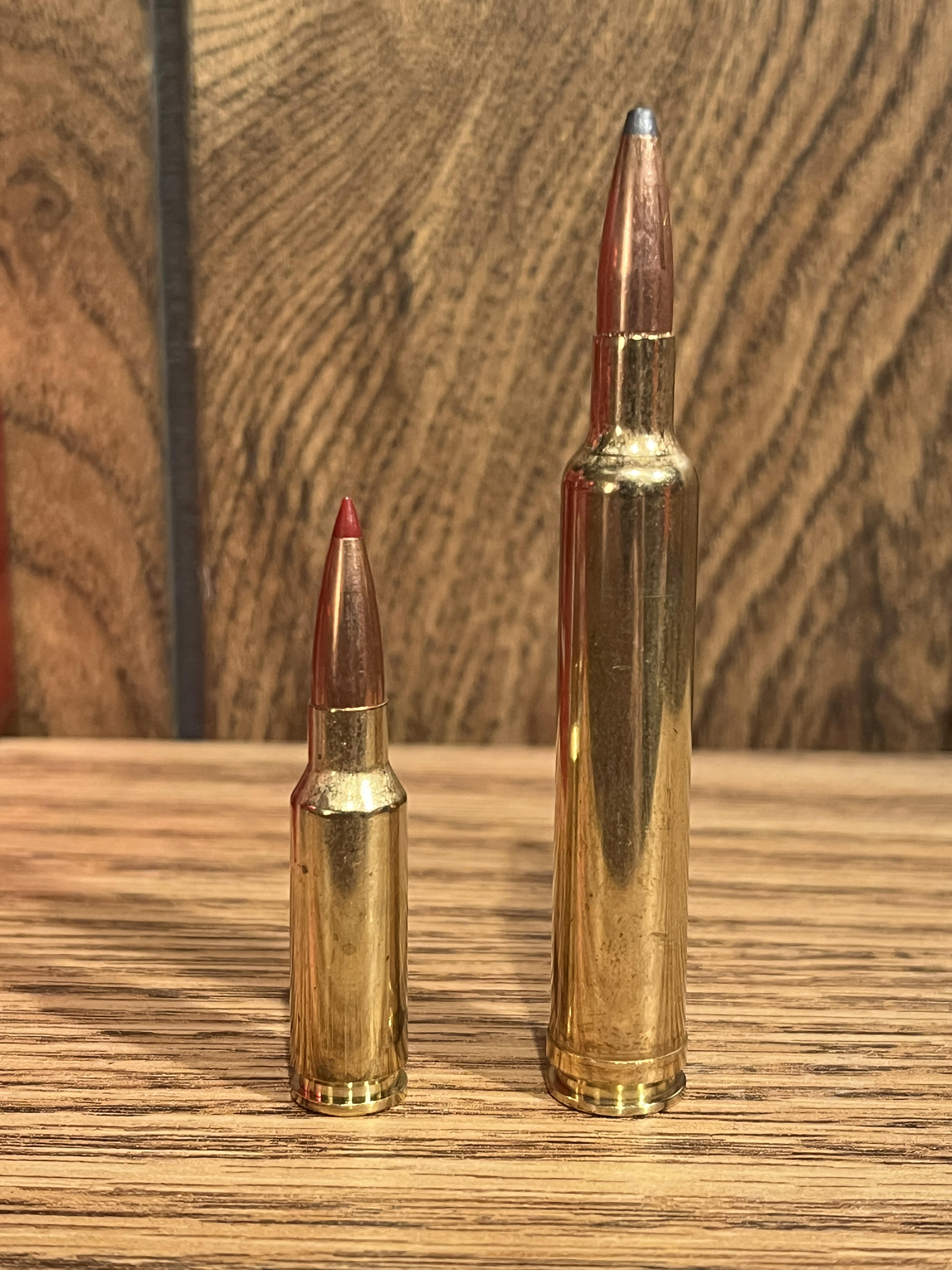
- Left: 6.5mm Grendel. Right: 6.5-300 Weatherby Magnum.
- Type: Rifle
- Place of origin: USA

Production history
- Designer: Weatherby
- Designed: Roy Weatherby experimented with the design in the 1950s. It wasn’t commercialized until 2016.
- Manufacturer: Weatherby
- Produced: 2016

Specifications
- Parent case: .300 Weatherby Magnum
- Case type: Belted, bottleneck
- Bullet diameter: .264 in (6.7 mm)
- Land diameter: .256 in (6.5 mm)
- Neck diameter: .538698798658578 in (13.682949485927 mm)
- Shoulder diameter: .4949 in (12.57 mm)
- Base diameter: .512 in (13.0 mm)
- Rim diameter: .5315 in (13.50 mm)
- Case length: 2.825 in (71.8 mm)
- Overall length: 3.600 in (91.4 mm)
- Case capacity: 98 gr H_{2}O (6.4 cm^{3})
- Rifling twist: 1-8"
- Primer type: Large Rifle Magnum
- Maximum pressure (S.A.A.M.I.): 65,000 PSI (448 MPa)

Ballistic performance
Bullet mass/type	Velocity	Energy
127 gr (8 g) LRX	3,531 ft/s (1,076 m/s)	3,516 ft⋅lbf (4,767 J)
130 gr (8 g) Scirocco	3,476 ft/s (1,059 m/s)	3,487 ft⋅lbf (4,728 J)
140 gr (9 g) A-Frame	3,395 ft/s (1,035 m/s)	3,583 ft⋅lbf (4,858 J)
- Test barrel length: 26; Source: Weatherby

The 6.5-300 Weatherby Magnum is a 6.5mm cartridge created by Weatherby in 2016 for the growing 6.5mm long-range rifle market.

== Background ==
As what was then the newest in Weatherby's lineup, this cartridge was designed to directly compete with the 26 Nosler.

== Performance ==
Claimed by Weatherby to be the fastest 6.5mm cartridge available.

Designed in a similar fashion as other Weatherby cartridges, it has a large-for-caliber case capacity, resulting in high velocities. When bullets with high ballistic coefficients are used, trajectories are extremely flat, allowing the projectile to retain a significant amount of energy downrange.

== Availability ==
Weatherby is currently the only manufacturer of rifles chambered in the 6.5-300 Weatherby Magnum, as well as the only current supplier of ammunition. Brass cases are available from Weatherby and Petersen for handloading. Cases can also be formed by necking down .300 Weatherby Magnum brass.

== See also ==
- List of rifle cartridges
- Table of handgun and rifle cartridges
