= Saboted light armor penetrator =

Type of ammunition

The saboted light armor penetrator (SLAP) family of firearm ammunition is designed to penetrate armor more efficiently than standard armor-piercing ammunition. In the US it was developed by the Marine Corps during the mid/late 1980s and was approved for service use in 1990 during Operation Desert Storm. It uses a reduced caliber, heavy metal (usually tungsten), thinner (e.g. .30 inch diameter) penetrator wrapped in a light, plastic sabot of greater diameter (in this example, .50 inch); the .308 SLAP round was a .223 inch diameter penetrator core within a .308 inch plastic sabot. It can penetrate light tanks and vehicles.

== Design and use ==
The SLAP design incorporates a polymer sabot, which allows for the use of a tungsten penetrator projectile of a lesser diameter than the original bore. By using the casing of a large cartridge with a lightweight projectile, the velocity of the projectile is greatly increased (in exchange for a corresponding loss of mass) and the sectional density in flight (after the sabot has been discarded) is improved without requiring a (potentially dangerous) increase in chamber pressure.

SLAP rounds have been designed for use against lightly armored vehicles and aircraft.

Saboted ammunition should not be used in firearms with muzzle brakes unless the muzzle brake has been specifically designed for such use. For example, .50 SLAP ammunition is completely interoperable with M2 machine guns with a stellite liner.

== Types of SLAP ammunition ==
List of SLAP ammunition
Caliber	Country	Designation	Description
7.62×51mm NATO	United States	M948 (standard); M959 (tracer)	Abandoned. Intended for the M60 machine gun, but caused catastrophic barrel failures when tested. Penetration was increased, but not to same extent as in the .50 BMG SLAP round.
7.62×51mm NATO	Sweden	7,62 mm Sk Ptr 10 PRICK	In use with the Psg 90 sniper rifle.
.50 BMG (12.7×99mm NATO)	United States	M903 (standard); M962 (tracer)	For use in M2 machine guns only (the open-tipped round design reduces compatibility). The 355-grain (23.0 g) projectile runs at 4,000 feet per second (1,200 m/s), for a kinetic energy of 12,200 foot-pounds force (16,500 J).
14.5×114mm	China	DGJ-02 APDSI-T	Mainly intended for QJG-02. Dual-color tracer. Has a muzzle velocity of 1,250 m/s (4,100 ft/s) and is quoted as being able to penetrate 20 mm (0.79 in) of armour plate set at an angle of 50° at 800 m (2,600 ft). An earlier version was designed for the QJZ91, which did not see combat.

== Production ==
U.S. SLAP ammunition is produced by the Winchester Cartridge Company and Olin Manufacturing. The team began production of the ammunition in 1985. The sabot that contains the sub-caliber is manufactured by Cytec Industries.

== See also ==
- Armour-piercing discarding sabot – the equivalent class of ordnance caliber ammunition.
