= .375 Winchester =

US rifle cartridge

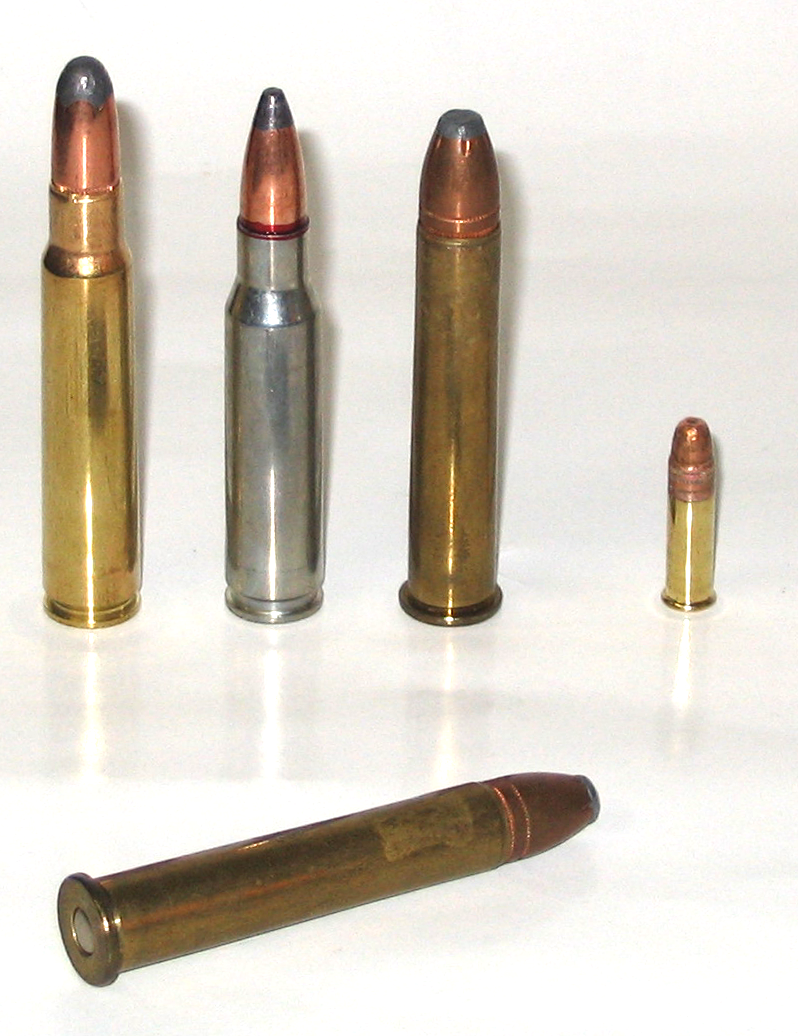
- Foreground: .375 Winchester. Left to right: 8mm Mauser, .308 Winchester, .375 Winchester, .22 Long Rifle.
- Type: Rifle
- Place of origin: United States

Production history
- Designed: 1978
- Manufacturer: Winchester
- Produced: 1978–present

Specifications
- Parent case: .38-55 Winchester
- Case type: Rimmed, straight
- Bullet diameter: .375 in (9.5 mm)
- Land diameter: .366 in (9.3 mm)
- Neck diameter: .400 in (10.2 mm)
- Base diameter: .420 in (10.7 mm)
- Rim diameter: .506 in (12.9 mm)
- Rim thickness: .063 in (1.6 mm)
- Case length: 2.020 in (51.3 mm)
- Overall length: 2.560 in (65.0 mm)
- Maximum pressure (CIP): 55,000 psi (380 MPa)
- Maximum CUP: 52,000 CUP

Ballistic performance
Bullet mass/type	Velocity	Energy
200 gr (13 g) JFP	2,223 ft/s (678 m/s)	2,194.12 ft⋅lbf (2,974.83 J)
200 gr (13 g) JFP	2,419 ft/s (737 m/s)	2,598.09 ft⋅lbf (3,522.54 J)
220 gr (14 g) JFP	2,029 ft/s (618 m/s)	2,010.66 ft⋅lbf (2,726.09 J)
220 gr (14 g) JFP	2,236 ft/s (682 m/s)	2,441.85 ft⋅lbf (3,310.70 J)

The .375 Winchester / 9.5x51mmR is a modernized version of the .38-55 Winchester, a black powder cartridge from 1884. It was introduced in 1978 along with the Winchester Model 94 "Big Bore" lever action rifle, which was in production from 1978 until 1986.

Though very similar in appearance to the .38-55 Winchester parent cartridge, the .375 Winchester cartridge has a shorter case length and operates at a higher chamber pressure of 52,000 CUP or 55,000 psi (380 MPa), compared to the .38-55 Winchester cartridge which has a longer case length and operates at a lower chamber pressure of 30,000 CUP or 35,000 psi (240 MPa).

The most commonly used bullet weights for the .375 Winchester are between 180 gr to 260 gr (11.7 g to 16.9 g) and it has been used on a variety of medium to large game species such as whitetail, pronghorn, caribou, elk, moose, black bear, and brown bear.

== See also ==
- List of rimmed cartridges
- List of rifle cartridges
- .360 Buckhammer
- .38-55 Winchester
