= .300 Pegasus =

Rifle cartridge

- Place of origin: United States

Production history
- Produced: 1994

Specifications
- Case type: Rimless
- Bullet diameter: 7.82 mm (0.308 in)

.300 Pegasus is an American rifle cartridge which was developed in 1994. It was a completely new case design with no parent case, but has approximately the same breechface diameter (14.73 mm; 0.580 in) as the .378 Weatherby Magnum, but without the magnum belt. Due to this, the .300 Pegasus has a larger case capacity than the .30-378 Weatherby Magnum.

The cartridge has an impressively high velocity which makes it quite flat shooting, but estimated barrel life time is short, with some estimates at around only 500 rounds. The cartridge is usually only recommended for very experienced reloaders.
