= 7mm Weatherby Magnum =

Rifle cartridge

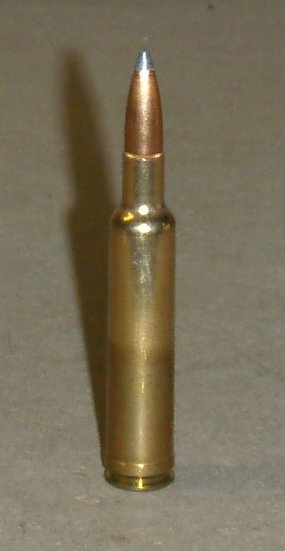
- 7mm Weatherby cartridge
- Type: Game Cartridge
- Place of origin: United States

Production history
- Designer: Roy Weatherby
- Designed: Circa 1940

Specifications
- Case type: Belted, Bottleneck
- Bullet diameter: 0.284 in (7.2 mm)
- Neck diameter: .312 in (7.9 mm)
- Shoulder diameter: .490 in (12.4 mm)
- Base diameter: .511 in (13.0 mm)
- Rim diameter: .530 in (13.5 mm)
- Rim thickness: .048 in (1.2 mm)
- Case length: 2.549 in (64.7 mm)
- Overall length: 3.30–3.360 in (83.8–85.3 mm)
- Rifling twist: 1:10
- Primer type: Large Rifle
- Maximum pressure: 65,000 psi

Ballistic performance
Bullet mass/type	Velocity	Energy
146 gr (9 g) Hammer Bullet	3,275 ft/s (998 m/s)	3,477 ft⋅lbf (4,714 J)
154 gr (10 g) Hornady Spire Point (Select)	3,150 ft/s (960 m/s)	3,393 ft⋅lbf (4,600 J)
154 gr (10 g) Hornady Spire Point (Select Plus)	3,225 ft/s (983 m/s)	3,556 ft⋅lbf (4,821 J)
140 gr (9 g) Barnes TTSX	3,250 ft/s (990 m/s)	3,283 ft⋅lbf (4,451 J)
160 gr (10 g) Swift A-Frame	3,125 ft/s (952 m/s)	3,469 ft⋅lbf (4,703 J)
- Test barrel length: 26; Source: Weatherby.com

The 7mm Weatherby Magnum is a powerful 7mm rifle cartridge offered by the Weatherby firearms company in their Mark V rifles. The cartridge was one of the first cartridges offered by the Weatherby company.

== History ==
It was developed among the first line of Weatherby cartridges back in the early 1940s by Roy Weatherby. As with other Weatherby Magnum cartridges, the 7mm Wby Mag design is based on the .300 Holland & Holland Magnum case. It is necked down to 7mm (.284) and features the trademark double radius shoulder. The case was blown out to eliminate the taper and shortened to feed from a standard length action like the .257 Wby Mag and the .270 Wby Mag.

The 7mm Weatherby Magnum did not get a lot of exposure until the early part of the 1950s when the Weatherby rifles became more available. The more popular 7mm Remington Magnum, introduced in 1962, has similar ballistics when compared to the 7mm Weatherby. However, being introduced 18 years earlier, the 7mm Weatherby Magnum due to the case design delivers a slight edge over the more popular 7mm Rem Mag in terms of ballistics. But since it is fed from a similar action length, the Remington was available in cheaper more plentiful rifles giving it a significant boost in popularity that continues to this day.

Weatherby's early 7mm rifles were manufactured with 1:12" barrels, which were too slow to stabilize the heavier bullets. Once the 7mm Rem Mag was introduced, manufactured with 1:9 1/4" barrels, Roy Weatherby decided to modify the twist for a 1:10.

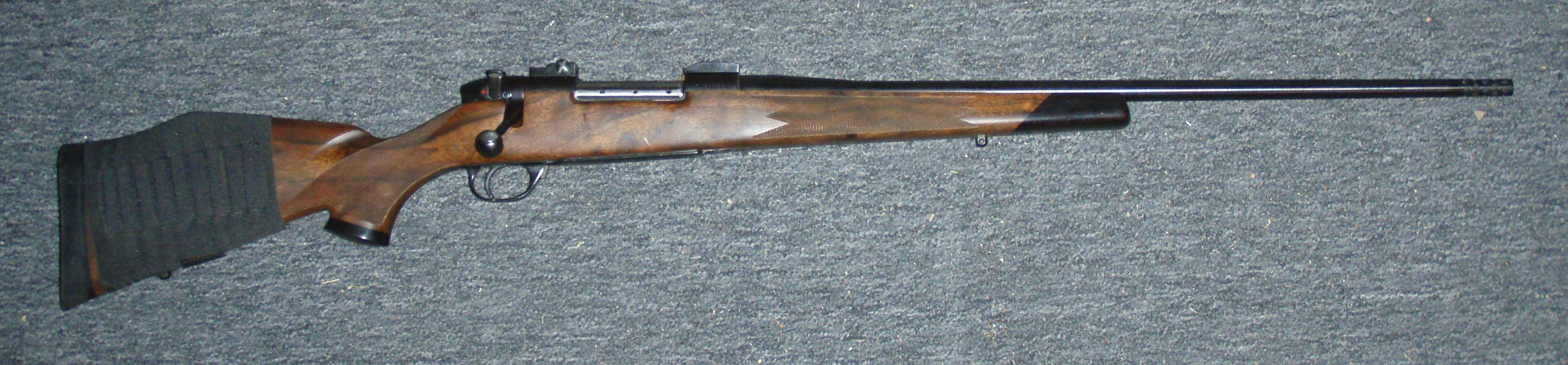
Weatherby Mark V in 7mm Weatherby

== Sporting use ==
The 7mm Weatherby Magnum is a very adequate cartridge for hunting medium to large-sized deer such as mule deer, wapiti and moose, up to long ranges due to its plain trajectory with bullets of different weights and due to the high ballistic coefficient the 7mm bullets are praised for. However, with adequately constructed bullets, the 7mm Wby Mag may be used for hunting larger game, including the great bears and the American bison.

As with other belted magnum cartridges, recoil is significant, due to the high pressures that are characteristic of Weatherby Magnum, though not as heavy as larger-caliber magnums such as the .300 Weatherby Magnum. Care must be taken to confirm what twist rate was used, as the earlier West German 7mm Weatherbys used a 1-in-12 twist vs the faster 1-in-10 twist for those of later manufacture. The 1x12 twist rifles will not stabilize bullets over 150 grains, while the 1x10 twist rifles will stabilize bullets weighing up to 175 grains.

== See also ==
- 7 mm caliber
- 7mm Remington Magnum
- Weatherby
- List of Rifle Cartridges
