= .338 Remington Ultra Magnum =

Rifle cartridge

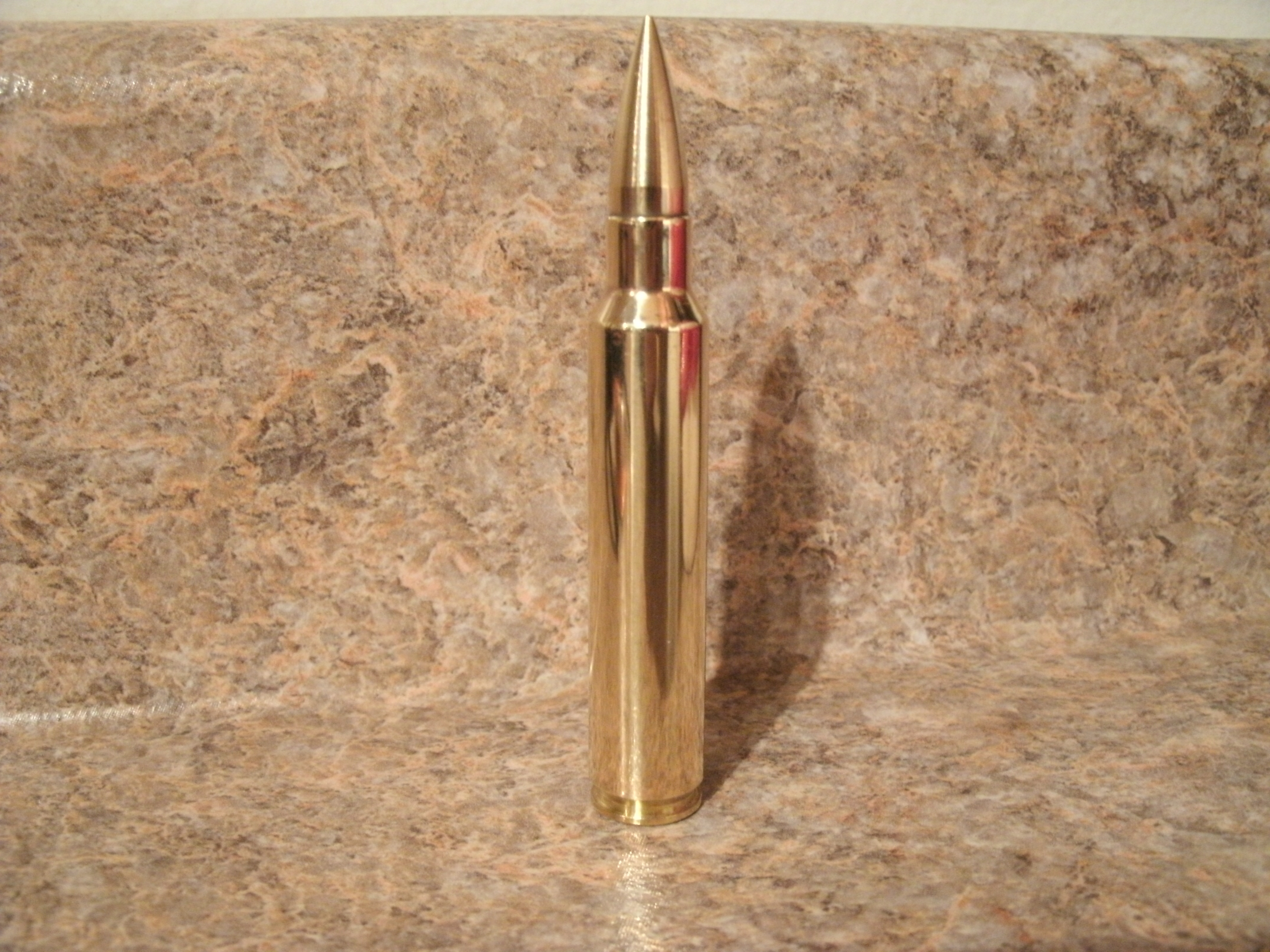
- Type: Rifle
- Place of origin: USA

Production history
- Designer: Remington
- Designed: 2000

Specifications
- Parent case: .300 Remington Ultra Magnum
- Case type: Beltless, rebated, bottleneck
- Bullet diameter: .338 in (8.6 mm)
- Neck diameter: .371 in (9.4 mm)
- Shoulder diameter: .526 in (13.4 mm)
- Base diameter: .550 in (14.0 mm)
- Rim diameter: .534 in (13.6 mm)
- Case length: 2.760 in (70.1 mm)
- Overall length: 3.600 in (91.4 mm)
- Case capacity: 113 gr H_{2}O (7.3 cm^{3})
- Rifling twist: 1-10 in (254 mm)
- Primer type: Large rifle magnum
- Maximum pressure: 65,000

Ballistic performance
| Bullet mass/type | Velocity | Energy |
|---|---|---|
| 250 gr (16 g) PSP Bonded | 2,860 ft/s (870 m/s) | 4,540 ft⋅lbf (6,160 J) |
| 250 gr (16 g) PSP A-Frame | 2,860 ft/s (870 m/s) | 4,540 ft⋅lbf (6,160 J) |
- Test barrel length: 26"

The .338 Remington Ultra Magnum is a .338 caliber rifle cartridge introduced by Remington Arms in 2002.

== Design ==
It is a beltless, rebated rim cartridge based on the .300 Remington Ultra Magnum case shortened .090" and necked-up to accept a 0.338-inch (.338 caliber) bullet. The .338 Remington Ultra Magnum has a similar case capacity as the .338 Lapua Magnum and somewhat lower than that of the .338-378 Weatherby Magnum. It is one of the most powerful .338-caliber rounds in production.

== See also ==
- List of rifle cartridges
- Table of handgun and rifle cartridges
- .338 Edge
