= 7mm Remington Short Action Ultra Magnum =

Rifle cartridge

7mm Remington Short Action Ultra Magnum (SAUM)
- Type: Rifle
- Place of origin: United States

Production history
- Designer: Remington Arms Company
- Designed: 2002
- Manufacturer: Remington
- Produced: 2002–present

Specifications
- Case type: Rimless, bottleneck
- Bullet diameter: .284 in (7.2 mm)
- Neck diameter: .320 in (8.1 mm)
- Shoulder diameter: .5347 in (13.58 mm)
- Base diameter: .5357 in (13.61 mm)
- Rim diameter: .534 in (13.6 mm)
- Rim thickness: 0.050 in (1.3 mm)
- Case length: 2.035 in (51.7 mm)
- Overall length: 2.825 in (71.8 mm)
- Case capacity: 72.6 gr H_{2}O (4.70 cm^{3})
- Rifling twist: 1 in 10 in (250 mm)
- Primer type: Large rifle magnum
- Maximum pressure (SAAMI): 65,000 psi (450 MPa)
- Maximum pressure (CIP): 64,000 psi (440 MPa)

Remington introduced the 7mm Short Action Ultra Magnum (SAUM) cartridge in 2002 to compete with the 7mm Winchester Short Magnum cartridge. It was designed specifically for the Remington Model Seven Magnum rifle, and intended primarily for long-range hunting use. The difference in velocity between the 7mm SAUM cartridge and the 7mm Winchester Short Magnum (WSM) is less than 50 feet per second; they are almost ballistic twins. Both the 7mm SAUM and the 7mm WSM achieve optimal ballistic results when using bullet weights from 120 to 160 grains.

The 7mm SAUM suffered from being released later than the 7mm WSM, and very few manufacturers chambering rifles in this caliber. The low demand for factory ammunition in 7mm SAUM has resulted in a sharp increase in the cost of 7mm SAUM as of mid 2014.

Currently 7mm SAUM is experiencing a rebound in popularity with custom rifle builders and handloaders, as it is able to drive the long (180 grain class) bullets fast enough for long range target shooting.

The 7mm SAUM is a popular choice in f-class shooting, and has been used to take home multiple championships in this discipline. The 7mm Short Action Ultra Magnum cartridge (7mmx51) is a different cartridge than the similarly named 7mm Ultra Magnum (7mmx72). The two are not interchangeable.

The 7mm SAUM also fills a niche in extended long range competitions (700-2100 yards) where it is a popular choice.

== See also ==
- 7 mm caliber
- Table of handgun and rifle cartridges
