= 7mm Remington Magnum =

Rifle cartridge

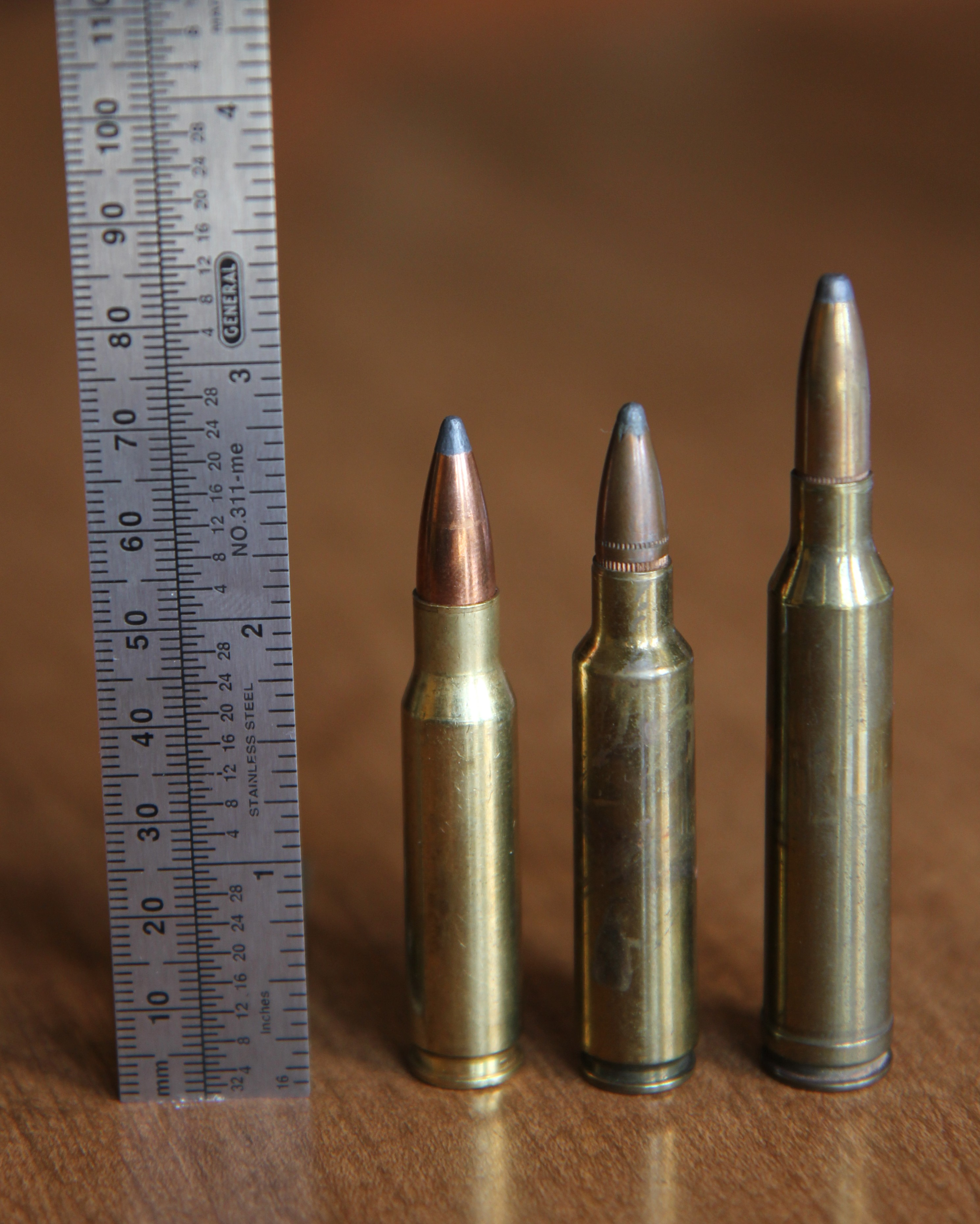
- Left to right: .308 Winchester, .284 Winchester and 7mm Remington Magnum
- Type: Rifle
- Place of origin: United States

Production history
- Designer: Remington Arms Company
- Designed: 1962
- Manufacturer: Remington
- Produced: 1962–present

Specifications
- Parent case: .375 H&H Magnum
- Case type: Rimless, bottleneck
- Bullet diameter: .284 in (7.2 mm)
- Land diameter: .277 in (7.0 mm)
- Neck diameter: .315 in (8.0 mm)
- Shoulder diameter: .491 in (12.5 mm)
- Base diameter: .512 in (13.0 mm)
- Rim diameter: .532 in (13.5 mm)
- Case length: 2.5 in (64 mm)
- Overall length: 3.29 in (84 mm)
- Case capacity: 82.0 gr H_{2}O (5.31 cm^{3})
- Rifling twist: 1/9 in (230 mm) to 1/10 in (250 mm)
- Primer type: Large rifle magnum
- Maximum pressure (C.I.P.): 62,366 psi (430.00 MPa)
- Maximum pressure (SAAMI): 61,000 psi (420 MPa)
- Maximum CUP: 52,000 CUP

Ballistic performance
Bullet mass/type	Velocity	Energy
110 gr (7 g) Barnes TTS	3,500 ft/s (1,100 m/s)	2,992 ft⋅lbf (4,057 J)
140 gr (9 g) Nosler AB	3,110 ft/s (950 m/s)	3,006 ft⋅lbf (4,076 J)
150 gr (10 g) Soft Point	3,110 ft/s (950 m/s)	3,221 ft⋅lbf (4,367 J)
165 gr (11 g) Sierra GK BT	2,950 ft/s (900 m/s)	3,188 ft⋅lbf (4,322 J)
175 gr (11 g) Soft Point	2,860 ft/s (870 m/s)	3,178 ft⋅lbf (4,309 J)
- Test barrel length: 24 in (610 mm); Source: Accurate Powder

The 7mm Remington Magnum (7.2x63mm) rifle cartridge was introduced as a commercially available round in 1962, along with the new Remington Model 700 bolt-action rifle. It is a member of the belted magnum family that is directly derived from the venerable .375 H&H Magnum. The original purpose of the belted magnum concept taken from the .300 H&H Magnum and .375 H&H Magnum, was to provide precise headspace control, since the sloping shoulders, while easing cartridge extraction, were unsuitable for this purpose. Improved cartridge extraction reliability is desirable while hunting dangerous game, in particular when a fast follow-up shot is required. The 7mm Remington Magnum is based on the commercial .264 Winchester Magnum, .338 Winchester Magnum, and .458 Winchester Magnum, which were based on the same belted .300 H&H Magnum and .375 H&H Magnum cases, trimmed to nearly the same length as the .270 Weatherby Magnum.

== History ==
On its introduction, the 7mm Remington Magnum substantially usurped the market share held by the .264 Winchester Magnum, which went into sharp decline in popularity and sales after 1962. By 1963 Winchester introduced the .300 Winchester Magnum to compete with Remington's new belted magnum cartridge. Both cartridges have remained the most popular magnum calibers among hunters and shooters ever since.

Les Bowman, hunting editor and outfitter was primarily responsible for the development and introduction of the cartridge. He noticed the need for a lower recoil cartridge capable of taking elk-sized game at the longer ranges common where he guided clients. He found that the .300 Weatherby Magnum produced too much recoil for many hunters, resulting in poor shot placement, and the .270 Winchester combined with the bullets available at the time, lacked the downrange energy to cleanly kill game. He found in the .275 Holland & Holland Magnum, a suitable alternative, but unavailable in the US.

== Design ==
The 7mm Remington Magnum offers ballistics better than the .30-06 Springfield with all available bullet weights, one of the more popular loads being a 160-grain spitzer loaded to 3,000 ft/s (910 m/s). This is due both to the higher muzzle velocity of the magnum compared to the Springfield and that .284 diameter bullets tend to have better ballistic coefficients than .308 diameter bullets of comparable mass. Because of the smaller bullet diameter .284 diameter bullets also have higher sectional density than .308 diameter bullets, and because of that better penetration in the target (it takes a 206-grain .308 diameter bullet to get the same sectional density as a 175-grain .284 bullet, an increased weight that requires 15-20% more muzzle energy to get the same muzzle velocity). The heaviest commercially loaded ammo available for the 7mm is 195 grains, while the .30-06 Springfield can be loaded with bullets up to 220 grains, but for a .308 caliber to equal the flat trajectory and penetration of a .284 diameter 180-grain bullet with a muzzle velocity of 2,860 ft/sec (870 m/s), as offered for the 7mm Remington Magnum, requires muzzle energy close to what the .300 Winchester Magnum can offer, i.e. well beyond what the .30-06 can deliver.

== Cartridge dimensions ==
The 7mm Remington Magnum has 5.31 ml (82-grain) H_{2}O cartridge case capacity.

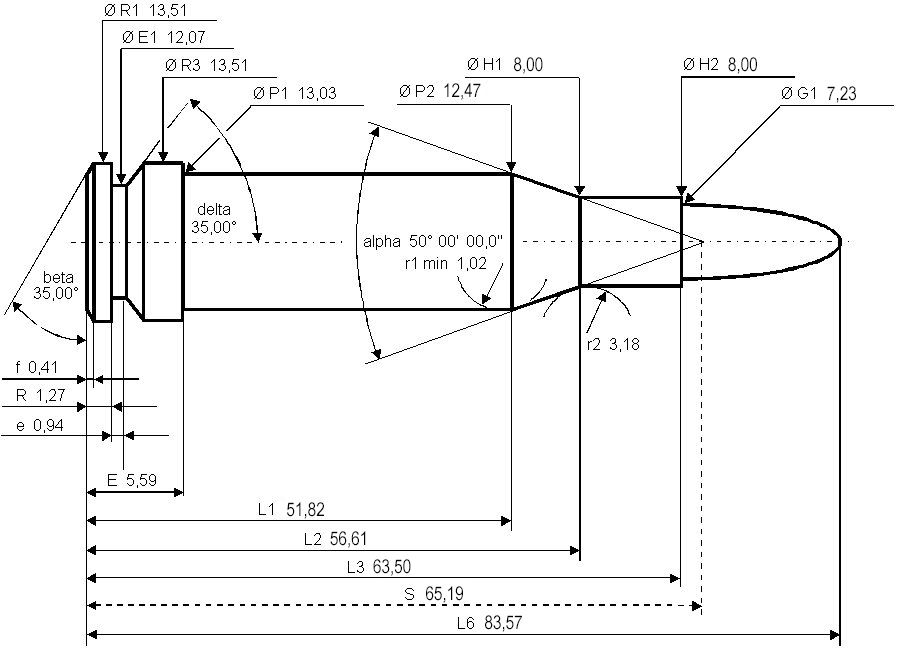

7mm Remington Magnum maximum C.I.P. cartridge dimensions. All sizes in millimeters (mm).

Americans would define the shoulder angle at alpha/2 = 25 degrees. The common rifling twist rate for this cartridge is 241 mm (1 in 9.49 in), 6 grooves, Ø lands = 7.04 mm, Ø grooves = 7.21 mm, land width = 2.79 mm. The cartridge uses a large rifle magnum primer type.

According to the official C.I.P. (Commission Internationale Permanente pour l'Epreuve des Armes à Feu Portatives) rulings, the 7mm Remington Magnum case can handle up to 430.00 MPa (62,366 psi) P_{max} piezo pressure. In C.I.P. regulated countries every rifle cartridge combo has to be proofed at 125% of this maximum C.I.P. pressure to certify for sale to consumers. This means that as of 2016, 7mm Remington Magnum chambered arms in C.I.P. regulated countries are proof tested at 537.50 MPa (77,958 psi) PE piezo pressure.

The SAAMI maximum average pressure (MAP) for this cartridge is 61,000 psi (420.58 MPa) piezo pressure.

== Use ==
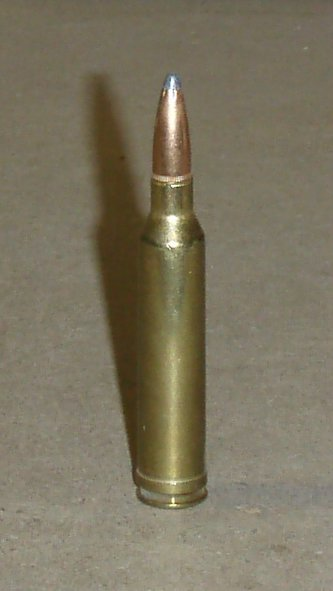

The 7mm Remington Magnum is a big game hunting cartridge capable of taking thin skinned game at considerable hunting ranges. Due to its high ballistic coefficient, which is common in all .284" caliber cartridges, the 7mm Rem Mag bucks wind efficiently. Because of its flat shooting nature and the relatively tolerable recoil, the 7mm Remington Magnum is especially popular for big-game hunting in Western Canada and in the United States, for plains game in Africa, and mountain hunting around the world. It has also been chambered in sniper rifles as the US Secret Service counter-sniper team has deployed this cartridge in urban areas along with the .300 Winchester Magnum. Popular online gun author Chuck Hawks calls the 7mm Remington "one of the great all-around rifle cartridges."

Some cartridges in 7mm Remington Magnum (circle size proportional to recoil).
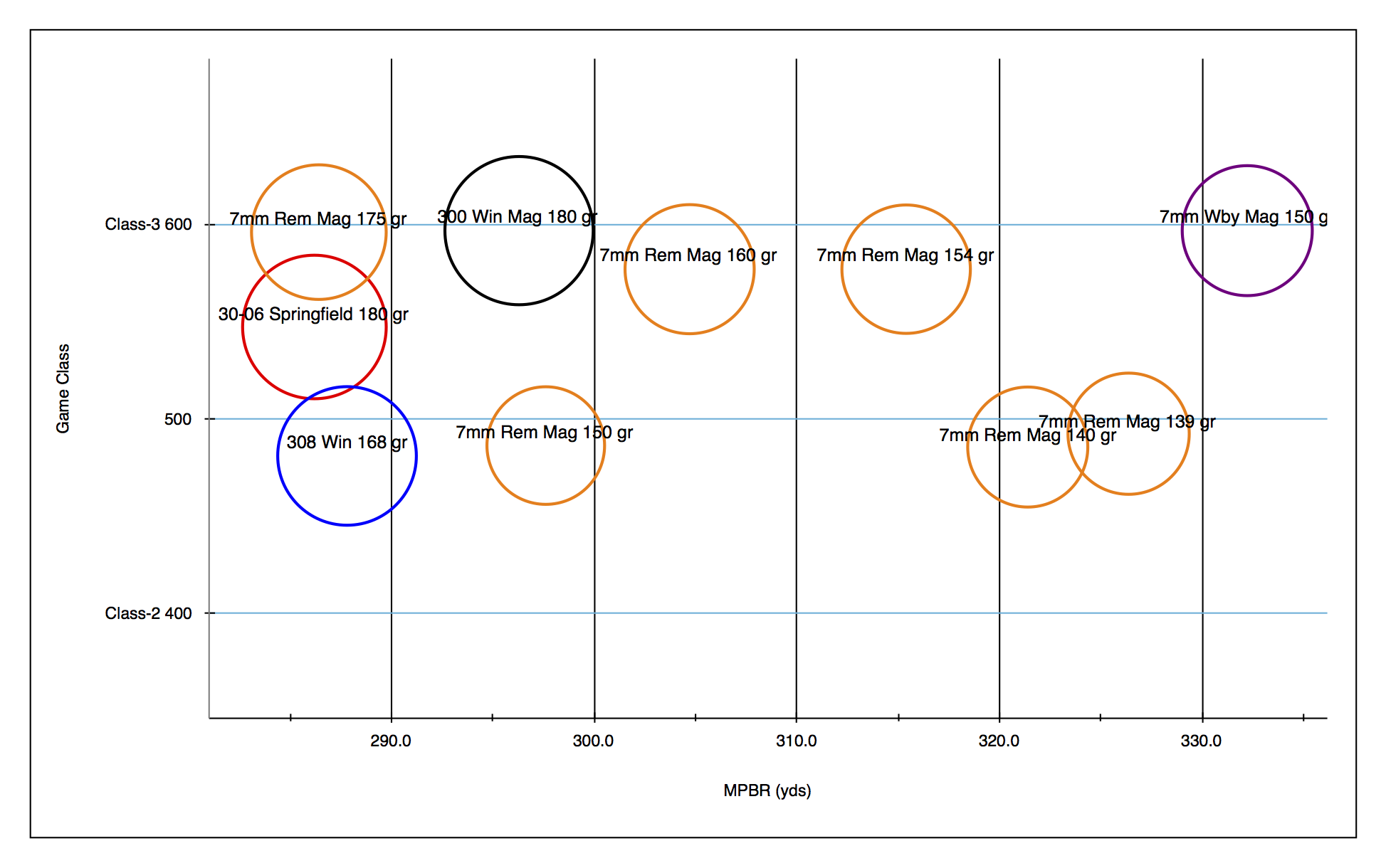
Game class vs 6 inch maximum point blank range.

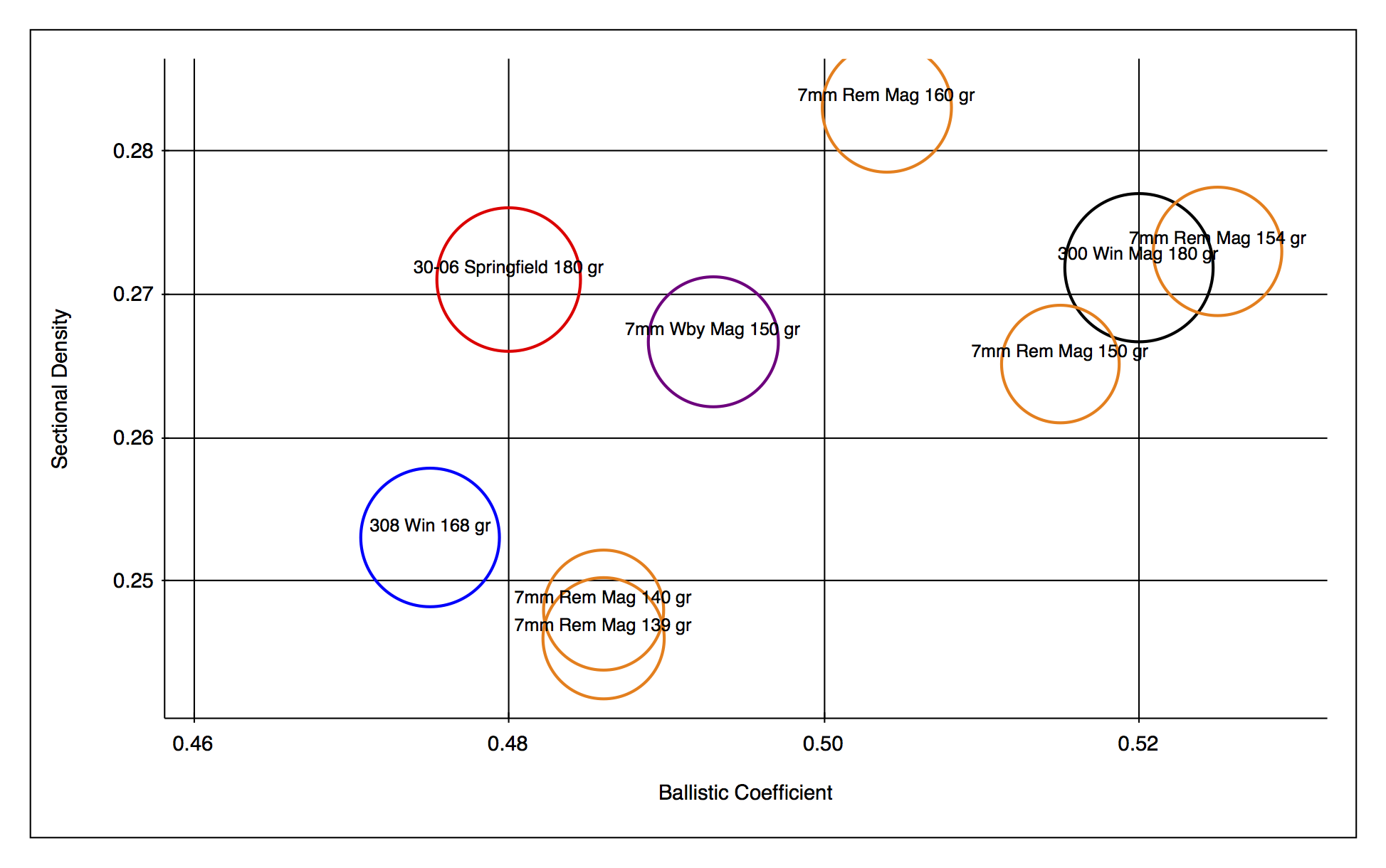
Sectional density vs ballistic coefficient.

== Choice of bullet and barrel length ==
Bullet choice when reloading is critical, as bullet velocity at close ranges may result in less robust bullets disintegrating without providing significant penetration on especially tough game. Thus one would do well to use a premium bullet of some sort, for instance a bonded bullet. The choice of barrel length is also critical, as a 26-or-27-inch (660 or 686 mm) barrel is commonly needed to achieve the full velocity potential of the cartridge, and a 24 inches (610 mm) barrel should be viewed as a practical minimum. This is because in shorter, i.e., sporter, barrels, of approximately 22 inches (559 mm), the cartridge ballistics deteriorate to much the same as those achieved in a .270 Winchester, while generating more recoil and muzzle blast than the .270 Winchester.

== See also ==
- .300 Winchester Magnum
- .275 H&H Magnum
- .300 H&H Magnum
- .270 Weatherby Magnum
- 7mm Weatherby Magnum
- 7mm Remington cartridges
- List of rifle cartridges
- Table of handgun and rifle cartridges
- 7mm caliber
- .280 Remington
- 7×64mm Brenneke has similar dimensions
