= .25-45 Sharps =

Rifle cartridge

- Type: Rifle
- Place of origin: United States

Production history
- Designer: Sharps Rifle Company
- Designed: 2008
- Manufacturer: Sharps Rifle Company
- Produced: 2012–present

Specifications
- Parent case: 223 Remington
- Case type: Rimless, bottleneck
- Bullet diameter: .257 in (6.5 mm)
- Neck diameter: .284 in (7.2 mm)
- Shoulder diameter: .3539 in (8.99 mm)
- Base diameter: .376 in (9.6 mm)
- Rim diameter: .378 in (9.6 mm)
- Rim thickness: .045 in (1.1 mm)
- Case length: 1.760 in (44.7 mm)
- Overall length: 2.260 in (57.4 mm)
- Rifling twist: 1 in 10 in (250 mm)
- Primer type: Small rifle

Ballistic performance
| Bullet mass/type | Velocity | Energy |
|---|---|---|
| 87 gr (6 g) Speer Hot-Cor Soft Point | 3,000 ft/s (910 m/s) | 1,739 ft⋅lbf (2,358 J) |
- Test barrel length: 24 inches (61 cm); Source(s): American Rifleman

The .25-45 Sharps (6.35×45mm) is a firearms cartridge designed by Michael H Blank, then CEO of the Sharps Rifle Company, LLC, as a general hunting cartridge for most North American game, in particular deer, antelope, hogs, and coyotes. Unlike .300 AAC Blackout which was targeted specifically at the suppressed rifle market, and adapted to hunting, the .25-45 Sharps was designed primarily as a hunting round.

That is not to say the round does not have tactical applications as its ballistics exceed that of the 5.56×45mm NATO cartridge. The cartridge name is derived from its caliber (.257 in (6.5 mm) bullet) and case length of 45 millimeters (necked-up 5.56×45 mm), as opposed to older hyphenated cartridges that were named for caliber and powder charge. Factory ballistics with the 87 gr (5.6 g) bullet equal those of the original .250-3000 Savage with the same bullet weight.

== See also ==
- 6×45mm
- 6.5×45 mm TCU
- 6 mm calibre
- Table of handgun and rifle cartridges
