= .257 Weatherby Magnum =

Rifle cartridge

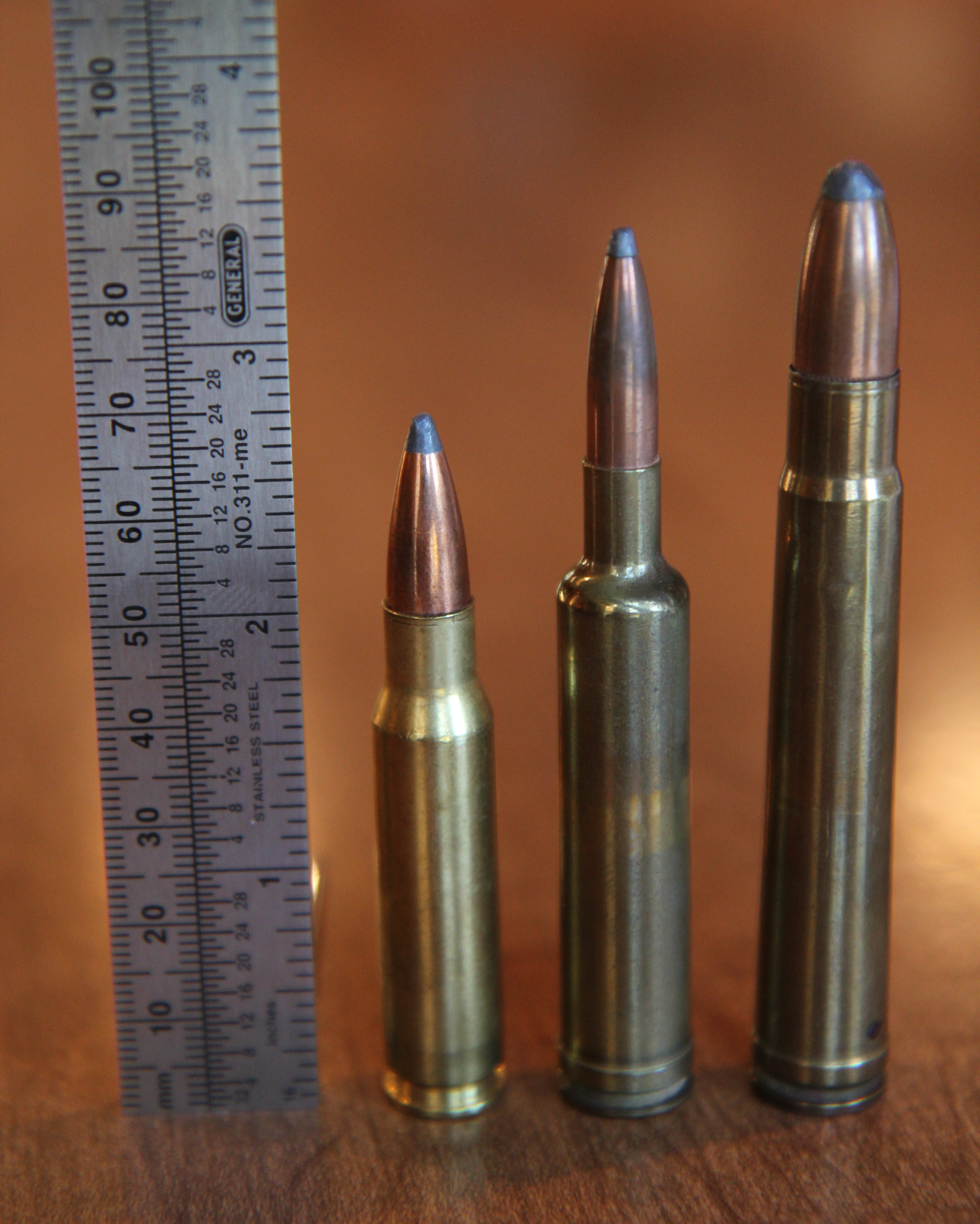
- .257 Weatherby Magnum (center) with .308 Winchester (left) and .375 H&H Magnum (right).
- Type: Rifle
- Place of origin: United States

Production history
- Designer: Roy Weatherby
- Designed: 1944
- Manufacturer: Weatherby
- Produced: 1948–present

Specifications
- Parent case: .375 H&H Magnum
- Case type: Belted Magnum
- Bullet diameter: .257 in (6.5 mm)
- Neck diameter: .283 in (7.2 mm)
- Shoulder diameter: .492 in (12.5 mm)
- Base diameter: .512 in (13.0 mm)
- Rim diameter: .5315 in (13.50 mm)
- Rim thickness: .051 in (1.3 mm)
- Case length: 2.545 in (64.6 mm)
- Overall length: 3.209 in (81.5 mm)
- Case capacity: 84 gr H_{2}O (5.4 cm^{3})
- Rifling twist: 1 in 10 in (250 mm)
- Primer type: Large Rifle (magnum)
- Maximum pressure: 65,000 psi (450 MPa)

Ballistic performance
Bullet mass/type	Velocity	Energy
87 gr (6 g) SP	3,825 ft/s (1,166 m/s)	2,826 ft⋅lbf (3,832 J)
100 gr (6 g) SP	3,602 ft/s (1,098 m/s)	2,881 ft⋅lbf (3,906 J)
117 gr (8 g) BST	3,400 ft/s (1,000 m/s)	2,952 ft⋅lbf (4,002 J)
120 gr (8 g) Partition	3,305 ft/s (1,007 m/s)	2,910 ft⋅lbf (3,950 J)
- Test barrel length: 26 in (660 mm); Source: Weatherby

The .257 Weatherby Magnum is a .257 caliber (6.53 mm) belted bottlenecked cartridge. It is one of the original standard length magnums developed by shortening the .375 H&H Magnum case to approx. 2.5 in (64 mm). Of the cartridges developed by Roy Weatherby, the .257 Weatherby Magnum was his favorite. Today, the cartridge ranks third in Weatherby sales, after the .30-378 Weatherby Magnum and the .300 Weatherby Magnum.

The .257 Weatherby Magnum can fire a 115 gr (7.5 g) Nosler Ballistic Tip bullet at 3,400 ft/s (1,036 m/s) generating 2,952 ft⋅lbf (4,002 J) of energy which is comparable to factory loadings of the .30-06 Springfield and the .35 Whelen in terms of energy.

Discrepancies between the metric and U.S. diameters of the bullet may cause confusion. A .257 bullet has a metric bullet diameter of 6.53 mm. However, in Europe cartridge designation nomenclature for a large part relies on the bore diameter. As the bore diameter of the .257 Weatherby Magnum is .250 inches this would make it a 6.35 mm caliber cartridge which uses 6.5 mm bullets (not to be confused with 6.5 mm caliber cartridges which use 6.7 mm/.264" bullets).

== Cartridge history ==
The .257 Weatherby Magnum was designed in 1944 and introduced commercially in 1945 by Roy Weatherby as a wildcat cartridge as a chambering in his rifles. The 257 Weatherby Magnum is one of Roy Weatherby's favorite calibers. The original cartridge was developed using the H&H Super 30 (a close variant of the .300 H&H Magnum which in turn is based on the .375 H&H Magnum) shortened, blown out, and necked down to accept a .25 caliber (6.35 mm) bullet. Together with the .270 Weatherby Magnum, the 7mm Weatherby Magnum, and the .300 Weatherby Magnum, the .257 Weatherby Magnum were the earliest cartridges introduced by Roy Weatherby.

The original cartridges were formed using Winchester's .300 H&H Magnum (H&H Super 30) and was only available as a component from Weatherby. Beginning in 1948 Weatherby began offering loaded ammunition for the .257 Weatherby Magnum cartridge which was loaded in house. Until then the cartridge was only available as a component brass which would require being loaded before use. Sometime later, the .257 Weatherby brass was manufactured by Richard Speer for Weatherby. However, due to space and organizational constraints Weatherby began looking for a source of ammunition for his cartridge. The search culminated in 1951 with Norma Projektilfabrik being awarded a contract to produce ammunition. Since then, all Weatherby Ammunition has been manufactured by Norma with the exception of a brief period of time between 1963 and 1964 when production moved to RWS/Dynamit-Nobel, a company which had entered into partnership with Weatherby.

Ever since the release of the .257 Weatherby Magnum, it has remained one of the more popular cartridges in terms of Weatherby sales. Gun writer Layne Simpson considers the .257 Weatherby one of his favorite long range cartridges.

== Design and specifications ==
The .257 Weatherby Magnum shares the same cartridge case as the .270 Weatherby Magnum and the 7mm Weatherby Magnum. The .30 Super Belted Rimless H&H manufactured by Winchester served as the direct parent cartridge for the case design. The .257 Weatherby Magnum was one of the first cartridges which used the shortened, blown out and necked down .375 H&H Magnum case and served as the forerunner to the standard length magnum cartridges such as the 7mm Remington Magnum and the .338 Winchester Magnum. There has been some speculation that Roy Weatherby may have used the full length .375 H&H Magnum case if he had slow burning powders available today when the cartridge was designed. The shortening of the case allowed for the more efficient use of the slow powder of the day, IMR 4350; a powder which would not have provided any great advantage for such cartridges as the .257 Weatherby Magnum or the .270 Weatherby Magnum if such cartridges utilized the full length H&H case. Today, IMR 4350 is considered too fast a burning propellant for the cartridge which comes into its own with the slowest burning powders now available.

Both SAAMI and the CIP have published specification for the cartridge. The CIP standards for the cartridge were published in January 1994.

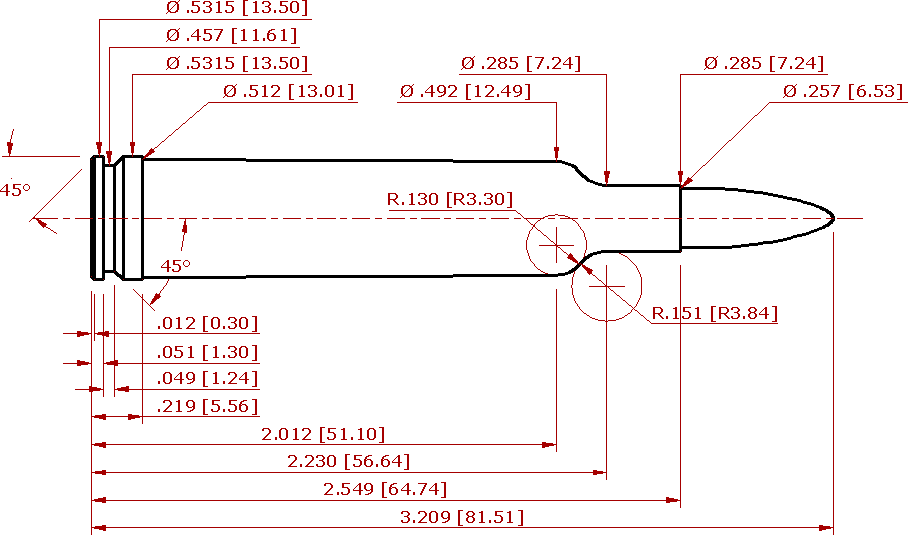
.257 Weatherby Magnum SAAMI compliant schematic. All dimensions in inches [millimeters].

SAAMI recommends a barrel rifling contour of six grooves with a bore Ø of .2505 in (6.36 mm) and a groove Ø of .257 in (6.5 mm) with each groove being .098 in (2.5 mm) wide. The recommended optional twist rate is one revolution in 10 in (250 mm). Both SAAMI and Weatherby recommend a freebore of .378 in (9.6 mm). Early .257 Weatherby rifles has a twist rate of 1 revolution in 12 in (300 mm) but all current rifles are manufactured with a twist rate of 1 revolution in 10 in (250 mm).

The .257 Weatherby Magnum has a case capacity of 84 gr. of water (5.45 cm^{3}). Sources such as Lyman and Weatherby's pressure rating suggest maximum average pressure limit of 66,000 psi (4,600 bar). CIP limits the .257 Weatherby Magnum to a maximum average pressure of 4,400 bar (64,000 psi).

The .257 Weatherby Magnum features the Weatherby double radius shoulder. The shoulder continuously curves and transitions from the body radius to the neck radius at the point of tangency at the shoulder between the two radii. The SAAMI dimensions for the cartridge reflect this implementation of shoulder to neck transition. While the CIP recognizes the correct radii for both the r1 and r2 values, they treat the transition from the body to shoulder and neck to shoulder as filet radii. For this reason the body and neck dimensions are lengthened and a shoulder angle provided. The treatment of the body-shoulder-neck transition zone accounts for the inconsistencies between SAAMI and CIP official dimensions for the cartridge.

== Performance ==
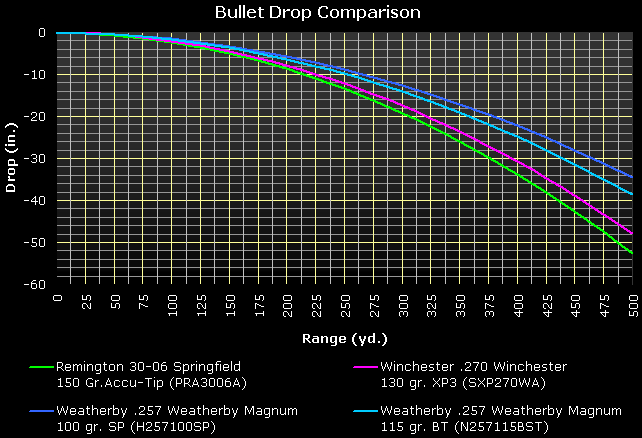
Comparison of trajectories of the .30-06 Springfield, .270 Winchester and the .257 Weatherby Magnum

The .257 Weatherby is known for its long range performance and is considered an accurate flat shooting cartridge. Initially due to the cartridge's high velocity the cartridge exhibits less bullet drop than most other cartridges. However, due to lower ballistic coefficients of these bullets, velocity (and therefore energy) is shed more quickly.

Weatherby's B25780TTSX, B257100TSX and the N257115BST ammunition have point blank ranges of 369 yd (337 m), 350 yd (320 m) and 323 yd (295 m) respectively. Thus no hold over is necessary when shooting at game at these ranges given that the rifles is zeroed correctly to accomplish this task.

The .257 Weatherby offers a 300–400 ft/s (91–122 m/s) over the 25-06 Remington cartridge which translates to around 600 ft⋅lbf (810 J) greater energy than the latter cartridge. Comparing the Remington's Premium PRC2506RA ammunition for the 25-06 Remington Weatherby's N257115BST .257 Weatherby bullet when zeroed for 200 yd (180 m) drops less than 30 in (76 cm) while the 25-06 Remington drop slightly over 44 in (110 cm) at 500 yd (460 m).

When sighted in for 300 yd (270 m) the bullet of Weatherby's N257115BST ammunition has only dropped 21.9 in (56 cm) at 500 yd (460 m) and retains 1,347 ft⋅lbf (1,826 J) energy. Compared to the Winchester's .270 WSM SXP270S ammunition show a bullet drop of 24.5 in (62 cm) but retains 1,552 ft⋅lbf (2,104 J). The N257115BST bullet retains enough energy to be effective on deer out to 550 yd (500 m) while the SXP270S's bullet extends this range out by a further 100 yd (91 m) although both the Weatherby's and Winchester's ammunition start with roughly the same muzzle energy.

Weatherby guarantees a 1.5 MOA accuracy with their ammunition in a Weatherby rifle, .99 MOA or better with their Sub-MOA Vanguard rifles, and .99 MOA or better with the new Vanguard Series 2 Rifles.

== Sporting usage ==
The .257 Weatherby makes an ideal pronghorn cartridge.

The cartridge has had success against mountain sheep and goat whether it be in the Alps, Rockies, Caucasus, Pamir or the Himalayas. Shooting distances are typically long, and the .257 Weatherby is able to reach out to the long ranges required to take the game.

Should the cartridge be employed for plains game in Africa, use should be restricted to game species under 440 lb (200 kg).

== Rifles and ammunition ==
Weatherby continues to chamber the .257 Weatherby Magnum in several models based on both the Mark V and Vanguard action types. The Weatherby Custom Shop offers a more personalized rifle based on these actions. Remington Arms manufactures released the Special Editions of the Model 700 CDL SF and the Model 700 LSS in 2008. The Weatherby rifles have deeply blued barrels while the Remington rifles have matte stainless steel barrels.

Weatherby rifle ammunition for the .257 Weatherby Magnum is manufactured by Norma of Sweden. Conley Precision Cartridge Company manufactures several premium lines of .257 Weatherby ammunition using Barnes, Nosler, Speer, Swift and Trophy Bonded bullets. Double Tap ammunition also offers loaded ammunition for sale.

.257 Weatherby Magnum ammunition
Ammunition	Bullet	Muzzle velocity	Muzzle energy	MPBR/zero
Weatherby B25780TTSX	80 gr (5.2 g) Barnes TTSX	3,870 ft/s (1,180 m/s)	2,661 ft⋅lbf (3,608 J)	369 yd (337 m)/317 yd (290 m)
Weatherby H25787SP	87 gr (5.6 g) Hornady SP	3,825 ft/s (1,166 m/s)	2,826 ft⋅lbf (3,832 J)	356 yd (326 m)/309 yd (283 m)
Weatherby G257100SR	100 gr (6.5 g) Norma SP	3,500 ft/s (1,100 m/s)	2,721 ft⋅lbf (3,689 J)	318 yd (291 m)/274 yd (251 m)
Weatherby H257100SP	100 gr (6.5 g) Hornady SP	3,602 ft/s (1,098 m/s)	2,881 ft⋅lbf (3,906 J)	345 yd (315 m)/296 yd (271 m)
Weatherby B257100TSX	100 gr (6.5 g) Barnes TSX	3,570 ft/s (1,090 m/s)	2,731 ft⋅lbf (3,703 J)	350 yd (320 m)/301 yd (275 m)
Weatherby N257110ACB	110 gr (7.1 g) Nosler Accubond	3,460 ft/s (1,050 m/s)	2,925 ft⋅lbf (3,966 J)	334 yd (305 m)/284 yd (260 m)
Weatherby N257115BST	115 gr (7.5 g) Nosler BT	3,400 ft/s (1,000 m/s)	2,952 ft⋅lbf (4,002 J)	332 yd (304 m)/282 yd (258 m)
Weatherby H257117RN	117 gr (7.6 g) Hornady RN	3,402 ft/s (1,037 m/s)	3,007 ft⋅lbf (4,077 J)	308 yd (282 m)/266 yd (243 m)
Weatherby N257120PT	120 gr (7.8 g) Nosler Partition	3,305 ft/s (1,007 m/s)	2,910 ft⋅lbf (3,950 J)	318 yd (291 m)/270 yd (250 m)
Values courtesy of the Weatherby. MPBR/Zero values courtesy of Big Game Info.

The 120 gr (7.8 g) Weatherby N257120PT ammunition should not be used in older .257 Weatherby rifles as the twist rate is too slow to adequately stabilize the bullet. The 117 gr (7.6 g) Weatherby H257117RN ammunition is manufactured for rifles with the slower twist rate.

== See also ==
- .25-06 Remington
- .25 WSSM
- .257 Roberts
- List of rifle cartridges
- Table of handgun and rifle cartridges
