= .300 Remington Ultra Magnum =

American rifle cartridge

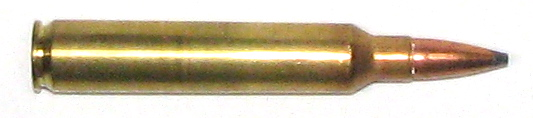
- .300 RUM cartridge
- Type: Rifle
- Place of origin: Canada

Production history
- Designer: Remington
- Designed: 1999
- Manufacturer: Remington Arms Company
- Produced: 1999–present

Specifications
- Parent case: .404 Jeffery
- Case type: cartridge, center fire primer, bottleneck
- Bullet diameter: .308 in (7.8 mm)
- Neck diameter: .344 in (8.7 mm)
- Shoulder diameter: .525 in (13.3 mm)
- Base diameter: .550 in (14.0 mm)
- Rim diameter: .534 in (13.6 mm)
- Case length: 2.850 in (72.4 mm)
- Overall length: 3.600 in (91.4 mm)
- Case capacity: 110.2 gr H_{2}O (7.14 cm^{3})
- Rifling twist: 1–10"
- Primer type: Large rifle magnum
- Maximum pressure: 65,000 psi (450 MPa)

Ballistic performance
Bullet mass/type	Velocity	Energy
150 gr (10 g) X	3,456 ft/s (1,053 m/s)	3,979 ft⋅lbf (5,395 J)
168 gr (11 g) BTHP	3,295 ft/s (1,004 m/s)	4,051 ft⋅lbf (5,492 J)
180 gr (12 g) BTSP	3,229 ft/s (984 m/s)	4,168 ft⋅lbf (5,651 J)
200 gr (13 g) SP	3,067 ft/s (935 m/s)	4,178 ft⋅lbf (5,665 J)
220 gr (14 g) RN	2,933 ft/s (894 m/s)	4,203 ft⋅lbf (5,699 J)
- Test barrel length: 24" (610 mm); Source: Accurate Powder

The .300 Remington Ultra Magnum, also known as the .300 Ultra Mag, 7.62×72mm or .300 RUM, is a 7.62 mm (.308 inch) rifle cartridge introduced by Remington Arms in 1999. The .300 Remington Ultra Magnum is one of the largest commercially available .30 caliber magnums currently being produced. It is a beltless, rebated rim cartridge, capable of handling all large North American game, as well as long-range shooting. Among commercially produced .30-caliber rifle chamberings, the .300 Remington Ultra Magnum is second only to the .30-378 Weatherby Magnum in cartridge-case capacity.

== History ==
In the early 1980s Aubrey White and Noburo Uno of North American Shooting Systems (NASS) based in British Columbia Canada began experimenting with the full length .404 Jeffery by reducing the taper and necking it down to various calibers such as 7 mm, .308, 311, 338, 9.3 mm and .375. These cartridges were known variously as the Canadian Magnum or the Imperial Magnums. Rifles were built on Remington Model 700 Long Actions and used McMillan stocks. Cartridges were fire formed from .404 Jeffery cases with the rim turned down, taper reduced and featured sharp shoulders.

Both Remington and Dakota Arms purchased the brass designed by Noburo Uno for use in their own experimentation and cartridge development. In 1999 Remington released the first of a series of cartridges virtually identical to the Canadian Magnum cartridges which featured a slightly wider body, increased taper, and shallower shoulders and named it the .300 Remington Ultra Magnum. Dakota too released their own version of the cartridge but chose not to turn down the rim and shortened the case to work in a standard-length action. Remington would go on to design their own shortened versions of the Ultra Magnum cartridge which they were to call the Remington Short Action Ultra Magnum (RSAUM), which competed against the Winchester Short Magnum line.

== Specifications ==
The .300 Remington Ultra Magnum is a member of the Remington Ultra Magnum cartridge family based on the .404 Jeffery via the Canadian Magnum cartridges. As these cartridges feature wider bodies than the belted magnums based on the .375 H&H case, these cartridges have greater case capacities than their corresponding full length belted Magnum cartridges such as the 7 mm Shooting Times Westerner, the .300 Weatherby Magnum, .340 Weatherby Magnum and the .375 Ackley Improved.

The .300 RUM features a rebated rim much like the .300 Canadian Magnum so as to allow the cartridge to function in the Remington M700 action without having to increase the bolt and bolt face diameter of the action. Unlike the belted Magnum cases based on the .375 H&H Magnum cartridge, the .300 RUM does not have a belt. All things being equal, a beltless cartridge would feed more reliably and more smoothly than a belted cartridge. Furthermore, as this is a beltless cartridge headspacing is designed to take place on the shoulder, which is considered beneficial by some as it is thought to promote accuracy and prolong case life of the cartridge. As modern belted magnums such as 7mm Remington Magnum and .300 Winchester Magnum actually headspace on the shoulder despite retaining the belt found on their parent cartridge, belted or unbelted is basically irrelevant in discussions of modern cartridges, and particularly so in discussions of unbelted cartridges.

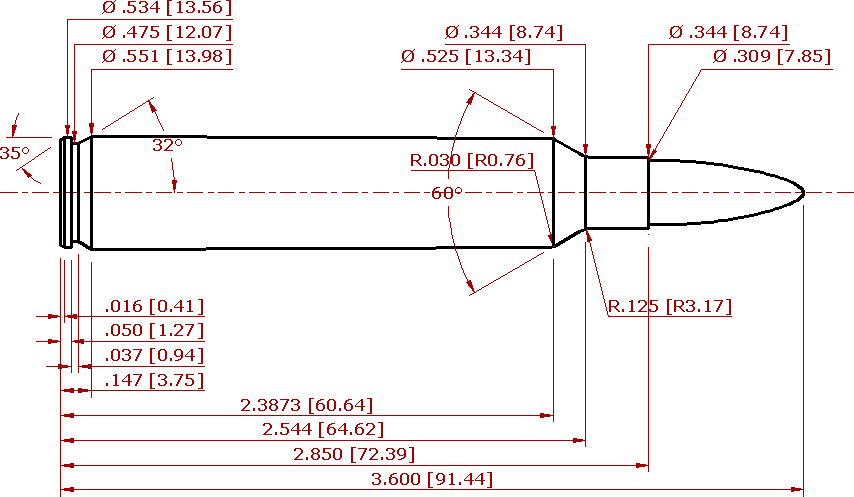
SAAMI compliant .300 Remington Ultra Magnum cartridge schematic: All dimensions in inches [millimeters].

SAAMI recommends that the barrel have a 6 groove contour with a twist rate of one revolution in 10 in (250 mm). The barrel is to have a groove width of .115 in (2.9 mm). Bore is given as .300 in (7.6 mm) and a groove is .308 in (7.8 mm). Maximum case overflow capacity is 122.5 gr. of water (7.30 cm^{3}). SAAMI recommended Maximum Average Pressure is set at 65,000 psi (4,500 bar).

Remington's ultra magnum cases were made wider than the .404 Jeffery case by .006 in (0.15 mm). The brass was made thicker so as to withstand the higher pressure of the new cartridge as the Jeffery cartridge had a maximum average pressure rating of 3,650 bar (52,900 psi).

== Performance ==
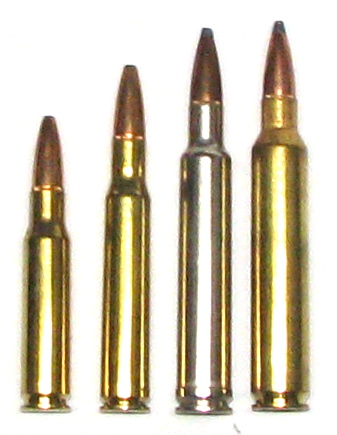
left-to-right: .308 Winchester, .30-06 Springfield, .300 Weatherby Magnum, .300 Remington Ultra Magnum

Remington ammunition for the .300 RUM is available in three Power Levels. Power Level I duplicates the .30-06 Springfield, Power Level II that of the .300 Winchester Magnum and Power Level III is the full power load. Remington offers the full power (Power Level III) .300 Remington Ultra Magnum ammunition in 150 gr (9.7 g) at 3,450 ft/s (1,050 m/s), the 180 gr (12 g) at 3,250 ft/s (990 m/s) and the 200 gr (13 g) at 3,032 ft/s (924 m/s). These are among the highest velocities attained by a .30 caliber production rifle cartridge.

Performance Characteristics .300 Remington Ultra Magnum Power Level III Ammunition
Cartridge	Criteria	Muzzle	100-yard (91 m)	200-yard (180 m)	300-yard (270 m)	400-yard (370 m)	500-yard (460 m)
Premier Scirocco Bonded 150 grains (9.7 g) PR300UM5	Velocity	3,450 ft/s (1,050 m/s)	3,211 ft/s (979 m/s)	2,985 ft/s (910 m/s)	2,769 ft/s (844 m/s)	2,564 ft/s (782 m/s)	2,369 ft/s (722 m/s)
Premier Scirocco Bonded 150 grains (9.7 g) PR300UM5	Energy	3,964 ft⋅lbf (5,374 J)	3,434 ft⋅lbf (4,656 J)	2,967 ft⋅lbf (4,023 J)	2,554 ft⋅lbf (3,463 J)	2,190 ft⋅lbf (2,970 J)	1,869 ft⋅lbf (2,534 J)
Premier Scirocco Bonded 150 grains (9.7 g) PR300UM5	Bullet Drop	−1.5 in (−3.8 cm)	2.6 in (6.6 cm)	3.2 in (8.1 cm)	0 in (0 cm)	−7.8 in (−20 cm)	−20.9 in (−53 cm)
Premier Scirocco Bonded 180 grains (12 g) PR300UM3	Velocity	3,250 ft/s (990 m/s)	3,051 ft/s (930 m/s)	2,860 ft/s (870 m/s)	2,677 ft/s (816 m/s)	2,502 ft/s (763 m/s)	2,334 ft/s (711 m/s)
Premier Scirocco Bonded 180 grains (12 g) PR300UM3	Energy	4,221 ft⋅lbf (5,723 J)	3,719 ft⋅lbf (5,042 J)	3,268 ft⋅lbf (4,431 J)	2,864 ft⋅lbf (3,883 J)	2,501 ft⋅lbf (3,391 J)	2,177 ft⋅lbf (2,952 J)
Premier Scirocco Bonded 180 grains (12 g) PR300UM3	Bullet Drop	−1.5 in (−3.8 cm)	2.9 in (7.4 cm)	3.6 in (9.1 cm)	0 in (0 cm)	−8.5 in (−22 cm)	−22.5 in (−57 cm)
Premier A-Frame 200 grains (13 g) RS300UM2	Velocity	3,032 ft/s (924 m/s)	2,793 ft/s (851 m/s)	2,566 ft/s (782 m/s)	2,352 ft/s (717 m/s)	2,148 ft/s (655 m/s)	1,954 ft/s (596 m/s)
Premier A-Frame 200 grains (13 g) RS300UM2	Energy	4,082 ft⋅lbf (5,534 J)	3,464 ft⋅lbf (4,697 J)	2,924 ft⋅lbf (3,964 J)	2,456 ft⋅lbf (3,330 J)	2,049 ft⋅lbf (2,778 J)	1,695 ft⋅lbf (2,298 J)
Premier A-Frame 200 grains (13 g) RS300UM2	Bullet Drop	−1.5 in (−3.8 cm)	3.7 in (9.4 cm)	4.5 in (11 cm)	0 in (0 cm)	−10.8 in (−27 cm)	−29.2 in (−74 cm)
Rifle sighted in 1.5 inch (2.5 cm) above bore axis. Altitude 1000 ft. Temperature 59 °F (15 °C). Values courtesy of Big Game Info Ballistic Calculator

The .300 RUM is an excellent long range cartridge with the ability to deliver a useful level of energy downrange especially with the power level III ammunition. Due to its high velocity it exhibits less bullet drop than most other .30 caliber (7.62 mm) cartridges.

Compared to other production .30 caliber (7.62 mm) cartridges, only the .30-378 Weatherby Magnum surpasses the .300 Remington Ultra Magnum. Factory loaded .30-378 Weatherby Magnum ammunition has a 150–200 ft/s (46–61 m/s) velocity advantage over the .300 RUM cartridge with any given bullet weight. However, the .30-378 Weatherby Magnum is considered the most overbore production sporting cartridge available and is not considered as efficient as the .300 RUM cartridge. In part due to its excessive freebore lengths the claimed velocities by Weatherby is a resultant factor of this freebore length. If chambered to allow bullets to seat to the lands of the rifling the large Weatherby cartridges would exhibit overpressure signs immediately. All things equal the .300 RUM and .30-378 Weatherby if chambered with the same throat and freebore would be comparable. Known freebore lengths of older Weatherby rifles have been in excess of 1 inch. The .30-378 is one of the most extreme cases of overbore and has among the highest throat erosion levels of any rifles.

== Sporting usage ==
The .300 Remington Ultra Magnum cartridge was conceived as a long range hunting cartridge and in this it exceeds most other cartridges. It is able to launch heavy bullets with high sectional densities at high velocities thereby retaining energy to take game cleanly at longer ranges than less powerful cartridges such as the .30-06 Springfield and even the .300 Winchester Magnum.

== See also ==
- List of rifle cartridges
- Table of handgun and rifle cartridges
- 7 mm caliber
