= .300 Weatherby Magnum =

Rifle cartridge

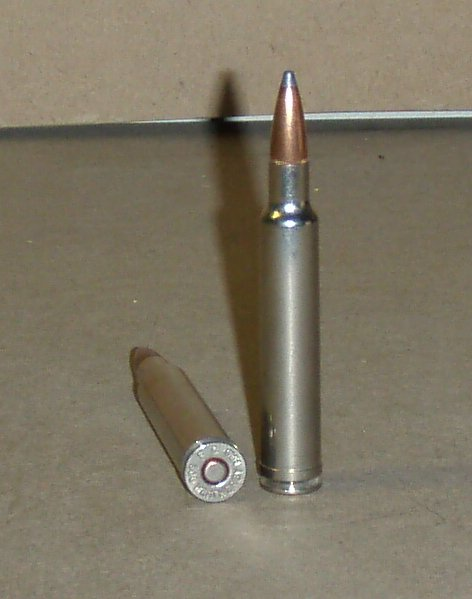
- .300 Weatherby cartridge
- Type: Rifle
- Place of origin: USA

Production history
- Designer: Roy Weatherby
- Designed: 1944
- Manufacturer: Weatherby
- Produced: 1944–present

Specifications
- Parent case: .300 H&H Magnum
- Case type: Belted, bottleneck
- Bullet diameter: .308 in (7.8 mm)
- Neck diameter: .336 in (8.5 mm)
- Shoulder diameter: .492 in (12.5 mm)
- Base diameter: .512 in (13.0 mm)
- Rim diameter: .531 in (13.5 mm)
- Case length: 2.825 in (71.8 mm)
- Overall length: 3.562 in (90.5 mm)
- Rifling twist: 1-10
- Primer type: Large rifle magnum
- Maximum pressure: 65,000 psi (450 MPa)

Ballistic performance
Bullet mass/type	Velocity	Energy
150 gr (10 g) SP	3,540 ft/s (1,080 m/s)	4,173 ft⋅lbf (5,658 J)
165 gr (11 g) SP	3,390 ft/s (1,030 m/s)	4,210 ft⋅lbf (5,710 J)
180 gr (12 g) BST	3,250 ft/s (990 m/s)	4,223 ft⋅lbf (5,726 J)
200 gr (13 g) Partition	3,060 ft/s (930 m/s)	4,158 ft⋅lbf (5,637 J)
220 gr (14 g) Rn-Ex	2,845 ft/s (867 m/s)	3,954 ft⋅lbf (5,361 J)
- Test barrel length: 26; Source(s): Weatherby

The .300 Weatherby Magnum is a .30 caliber rifle cartridge created by Roy Weatherby in 1944 and produced by Weatherby. It has become the most popular of all the Weatherby cartridges.

== Background ==
Roy Weatherby already had experience with other custom cartridges such as his own .270 Weatherby Magnum when he created the .300 Weatherby. Like most of his other magnum cartridges, this is based on a blown-out .300 H&H Magnum case, using the signature Weatherby double-radius shoulder. The Weatherby was first introduced in 1944, and the .300 Winchester Magnum was introduced in 1963.

In recent years, Remington, Winchester and Ruger have produced rifles in this caliber, and most major ammunition manufacturers now supply factory loads.

== Performance ==
Historically, Weatherby claimed that this is the most powerful .30 caliber magnum rifle commercially available, but the recently introduced .300 Remington Ultra Magnum, the .300 Norma Magnum and Weatherby's own .30-378 Weatherby Magnum are now more powerful. Of course there are quite a few very large .30 caliber wildcat cartridges.

When comparing the .300 RUM and the .300 Weatherby Magnum, however, there is a difference in factory loadings. Performance data is often listed on the side of the ammunition box for those who wish to do an in-store comparison. On average, Weatherby factory ammo is loaded to higher chamber pressures than Remington or Winchester magnum rounds. The Remington round can be handloaded to equal pressures, and as a consequence, surpass the .300 Weatherby in power.

The .300 Weatherby is commonly used by big-game hunters all over the world.

== Use ==
The SAS captured a rifle chambered in .300 Weatherby Magnum during the Falklands War.

== See also ==
- List of rifle cartridges
- 7 mm caliber other cartridges in the same caliber range
- Table of handgun and rifle cartridges
