= List of Magnum cartridges =

A magnum cartridge is a firearm cartridge with a larger case size than, or derived from, a similar cartridge of the same projectile (bullet) caliber and case shoulder shape. The term derives from the .357 Magnum, the original revolver cartridge with this designation. For the purpose of this list, magnum cartridges will only be those labeled magnum and will not include cartridges with the power of magnum cartridges like .300PRC, nor wildcat cartridges such as .300 Lapua Magnum

== Handgun cartridges ==
- .22 Winchester Magnum Rimfire
- .224–32 Freedom Arms
- .32 Harrington & Richardson Magnum
- .327 Federal Magnum
- .357/44 Bain & Davis
- .357 Smith & Wesson Magnum
- .357 Remington Maximum
- .357 Super Magnum
- .375 Super Magnum
- .400 Cor-Bon
- .40 Super
- .41 Action Express
- .41 Remington Magnum
- .414 Super Magnum
- .440 Cor-Bon
- .44 Remington Magnum
- .445 Super Magnum
- .45 Super
- .45 Winchester Magnum
- .45 Black Powder Magnum
- .451 Detonics Magnum
- .454 Casull
- .460 Smith & Wesson Magnum
- .475 Linebaugh
- .475 Wildey Magnum
- .480 Ruger
- .50 Action Express
- .500 Linebaugh
- .500 Maximum
- .500 Smith & Wesson Magnum
- .500 Wyoming Express
- .500 Bushwhacker

== Rifle cartridges ==
- 7mm Remington Short Action Ultra Magnum
- 7mm Winchester Short Magnum
- 7mm Remington Magnum
- 7mm Remington Ultra Magnum
- 7mm Mashburn Super Magnum
- 7mm Weatherby Magnum
- 8mm Remington Magnum
- 10.3x68 Magnum
- .17 Hornady Magnum Rimfire
- .22 Winchester Magnum Rimfire
- .222 Remington Magnum
- .223 Winchester Super Short Magnum
- .224 Weatherby Magnum
- .243 Winchester Super Short Magnum
- .240 Weatherby Magnum
- .244 Holland & Holland Magnum
- .25 Winchester Super Short Magnum
- .257 Weatherby Magnum
- .264 Winchester Magnum
- 6.5-300 Weatherby Magnum
- .270 Winchester Short Magnum
- .270 Weatherby Magnum
- .275 Holland & Holland Magnum
- .300 Ruger Compact Magnum
- .300 Remington Short Action Ultra Magnum
- .300 Winchester Short Magnum
- .300 Winchester Magnum
- .300 Holland & Holland Magnum
- .308 Norma Magnum
- .300 Norma Magnum
- .300 Weatherby Magnum
- .300 Remington Ultra Magnum
- .30-378 Weatherby Magnum
- .325 Winchester Short Magnum
- .338 Ruger Compact Magnum
- .338 Winchester Magnum
- .338 Remington Ultra Magnum
- .338 Norma Magnum
- .338 Lapua Magnum
- .340 Weatherby Magnum
- .338-378 Weatherby Magnum
- .358 Norma Magnum
- .375 Holland & Holland Magnum
- .375 Weatherby Magnum
- .375 Remington Ultra Magnum
- .378 Weatherby Magnum
- .400 Holland & Holland Magnum
- .416 Remington Magnum
- .458 Winchester Magnum
- .460 Weatherby Magnum
- .577 Tyrannosaur

== Belted magnum cartridges ==
- .224 Weatherby Magnum
- .240 Weatherby Magnum
- .244 Holland & Holland Magnum
- .257 Weatherby Magnum
- 6.5-300 Weatherby Magnum
- .264 Winchester Magnum
- .270 Weatherby Magnum
- .275 Holland & Holland Magnum
- 7mm Weatherby Magnum
- 7mm Remington Magnum
- 7mm Shooting Times Westerner
- .300 Holland & Holland Magnum
- .300 Weatherby Magnum
- .300 Winchester Magnum
- .30-378 Weatherby Magnum
- .308 Norma Magnum
- 8mm Remington Magnum
- .338 Winchester Magnum
- .338-378 Weatherby Magnum
- .340 Weatherby Magnum
- .350 Griffin & Howe Magnum
- .350 Remington Magnum
- .358 Norma Magnum
- .375 Holland & Holland Magnum
- .375 Weatherby Magnum
- .378 Weatherby Magnum
- .400 Holland & Holland Magnum
- .416 Remington Magnum
- .416 Taylor
- .416 Weatherby Magnum
- .450 Marlin
- .458×2-inch American
- .458 Lott
- .458 Winchester Magnum
- .460 Weatherby Magnum
- .465 Holland & Holland Magnum
- .475 A&M Magnum
- .500 A-Square

== See also ==
- Belted magnum
- Fully powered cartridge
- Intermediate cartridge
- PDW cartridge
