= Belted magnum =

Type of weapons cartridge

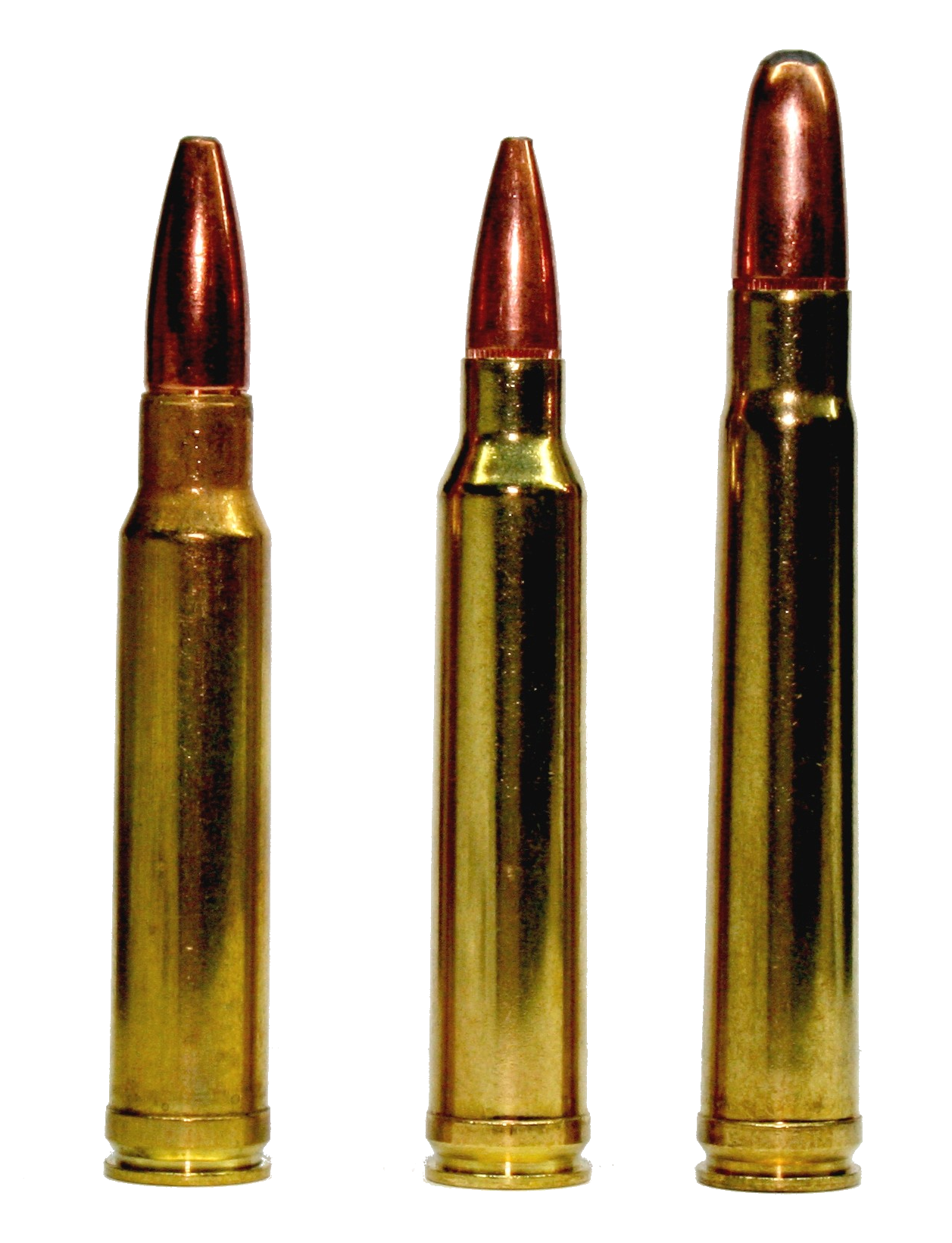
Three belted magnum cartridges, sharing the same parent case.

The term belted magnum or belted case refers to any cartridge, but generally a rifle cartridge, with a shell casing that has a pronounced "belt" around its base that continues 2–4 mm (0.079–0.157 in) past the extractor groove.

This design originated with the British gunmaker Holland & Holland for the purpose of headspacing certain more powerful cartridges. Non-shouldered (non-"bottlenecked") magnum rifle cartridges especially could be pushed too far into the chamber and thus cause catastrophic failure of the gun when fired with excessive headspace. The addition of the belt to the casing prevented over-insertion, while allowing smoother feeding from a box magazine compared to a rimmed cartridge. An example of an American adaption of this practice is seen in cartridges like the .458 Winchester Magnum, a straight-walled cartridge with a belt.

Many subsequent cartridges of "magnum" nomenclature were based on the original .375 H&H Magnum cartridge, so over time the belt became something of a standardized attribute, expected as part of a "magnum" cartridge. Many cartridge designs of the last century include this belt, but do not really require it.

Since the beginning of the 21st century, there has been an ever growing trend toward designing beltless magnum cartridges, virtually all of which are heavily shouldered designs that obviate the original motivation for a belt. The most recent belted magnum to be introduced in the market was the 6.5-300 Weatherby Magnum, commercially available since 2016.

Nevertheless, the most popular magnum cartridges remain those with a belted case, such as the .300 Winchester Magnum, the .375 H&H Magnum and the 7mm Remington Magnum.

== List of Belted Magnum Cartridges ==
- .224 Weatherby Magnum
- .240 Weatherby Magnum
- .244 Holland & Holland Magnum
- .257 Weatherby Magnum
- 6.5-300 Weatherby Magnum
- .264 Winchester Magnum
- .270 Weatherby Magnum
- .275 Holland & Holland Magnum
- 7mm Weatherby Magnum
- 7mm Remington Magnum
- 7mm Shooting Times Westerner
- .300 Holland & Holland Magnum
- .300 Weatherby Magnum
- .300 Winchester Magnum
- .30-378 Weatherby Magnum
- .308 Norma Magnum
- 8mm Remington Magnum
- .338 Winchester Magnum
- .338-378 Weatherby Magnum
- .340 Weatherby Magnum
- .350 Griffin & Howe Magnum
- .350 Remington Magnum
- .358 Norma Magnum
- .375 Holland & Holland Magnum
- .375 Weatherby Magnum
- .378 Weatherby Magnum
- .400 Holland & Holland Magnum
- .416 Remington Magnum
- .416 Taylor
- .416 Weatherby Magnum
- .450 Marlin
- .458×2-inch American
- .458 Lott
- .458 Winchester Magnum
- .460 Weatherby Magnum
- .465 Holland & Holland Magnum
- .475 A&M Magnum
- .500 A-Square
- .55 Boys
