= .378 Weatherby Magnum =

Rifle cartridge

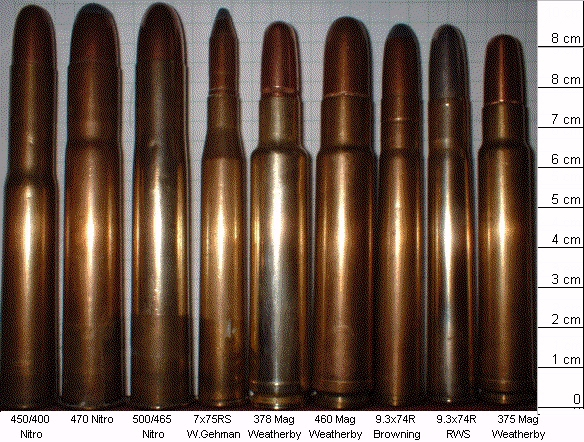
- .378 Weatherby Magnum, center
- Type: Rifle
- Place of origin: South Gate, California

Production history
- Designer: Roy Weatherby
- Designed: 1953
- Manufacturer: Weatherby
- Produced: 1953-Present

Specifications
- Case type: Belted, bottleneck
- Bullet diameter: .375 in (9.5 mm)
- Neck diameter: .399 in (10.1 mm)
- Shoulder diameter: .560 in (14.2 mm)
- Base diameter: .582 in (14.8 mm)
- Rim diameter: .579 in (14.7 mm)
- Rim thickness: .063 in (1.6 mm)
- Case length: 2.913 in (74.0 mm)
- Overall length: 3.65 in (93 mm)
- Rifling twist: 1 in 12 in (300 mm)
- Primer type: Large rifle magnum

Ballistic performance
Bullet mass/type	Velocity	Energy
300 gr (19 g) Full Metal Jacket	2,925 ft/s (892 m/s)	5,699 ft⋅lbf (7,727 J)
300 gr (19 g) Round nose	2,925 ft/s (892 m/s)	5,699 ft⋅lbf (7,727 J)
270 gr (17 g) Truncated solid	3,060 ft/s (930 m/s)	5,613 ft⋅lbf (7,610 J)
270 gr (17 g) Pointed soft point	3,180 ft/s (970 m/s)	6,062 ft⋅lbf (8,219 J)
260 gr (17 g) Partition Type	3,140 ft/s (960 m/s)	5,743 ft⋅lbf (7,786 J)
- Test barrel length: 26 in (66 cm); Source: Weatherby / Nosler

The .378 Weatherby Magnum was designed by Roy Weatherby in 1953. Although inspired by the .416 Rigby, it is an original belted magnum design with no parent case. The cartridge features a high powder capacity relative to its bore size, and can hold upwards of 7.13 g (120 gr) of powder. This consideration prompted the Federal Cartridge Company to introduce the 215 Magnum primer specifically for this round. The .378 shares the double radius shoulder design found on the other Weatherby magnum cartridges.

The impetus for the development of the .378 arose from Roy Weatherby's extensive field testing conducted in African hunting grounds. Based on his safari experiences, he believed it to be desirable to improve the performance afforded by his preexisting .375 Weatherby Magnum by devising a larger cartridge more in keeping with the design philosophy of his small-bore cartridges, such as his .300 and .257 Magnums.

To promote the .378, Roy Weatherby killed an African elephant with one shot at extended range. In order to gain access to markets across the African continent by accommodating the 10.16 mm (.40 caliber) minimum bullet size required for use on dangerous game in some countries, Weatherby soon necked the .378 to 11.63 mm (.458 caliber) and introduced the resultant cartridge as the .460 Weatherby Magnum in 1957.

Considered a safari-grade cartridge, the .378 Weatherby Magnum is appropriate for taking all African game animals, including the African antelopes, Nile crocodile, hippopotamus, and the Big Five. Some hunters on the North American continent employ the .378 for American elk, brown bear, and polar bear. With proper bullet selection, the .378 provides a similar trajectory to and greater downrange energy than the .300 Winchester Magnum, .300 Weatherby Magnum, and .338 Lapua Magnum.

The .378 Weatherby generates considerable free recoil with full-power loads, for an average of 72 ft·lbf from a 9 lb rifle. This compares to 23 ft·lbf from a rifle chambered for .30-06 Springfield or 44 ft·lbf for the .375 H&H Magnum. However, the .458 Winchester Magnum generates 78 ft·lbf and the .458 Lott produces 86 ft·lbf of free recoil. It should also be noted that Weatherby Mark V rifles chambered in this cartridge are equipped from the factory with removable muzzle brakes that greatly reduce felt recoil.

The .378 has been responsible for numerous wildcat cartridges. It has been necked-down as the .22 Eargesplitten Loudenboomer and necked-up as the .475 A&M and .500 A-Square, and shortened to produce the .30-378 Arch (7.62mm), .338-378 KT, and .460 Short A-Square (11.63mm). Some .378-based derivatives have gone on to be part of the Weatherby line: namely, the .30-378, .338-378, .416 and .460.

== See also ==
- List of rifle cartridges
- 9 mm caliber other cartridges in the same caliber range.
- .22 Eargesplitten Loudenboomer
- .30-378 Weatherby Magnum
- .338-378 Weatherby Magnum
