= .340 Weatherby Magnum =

Rifle cartridge

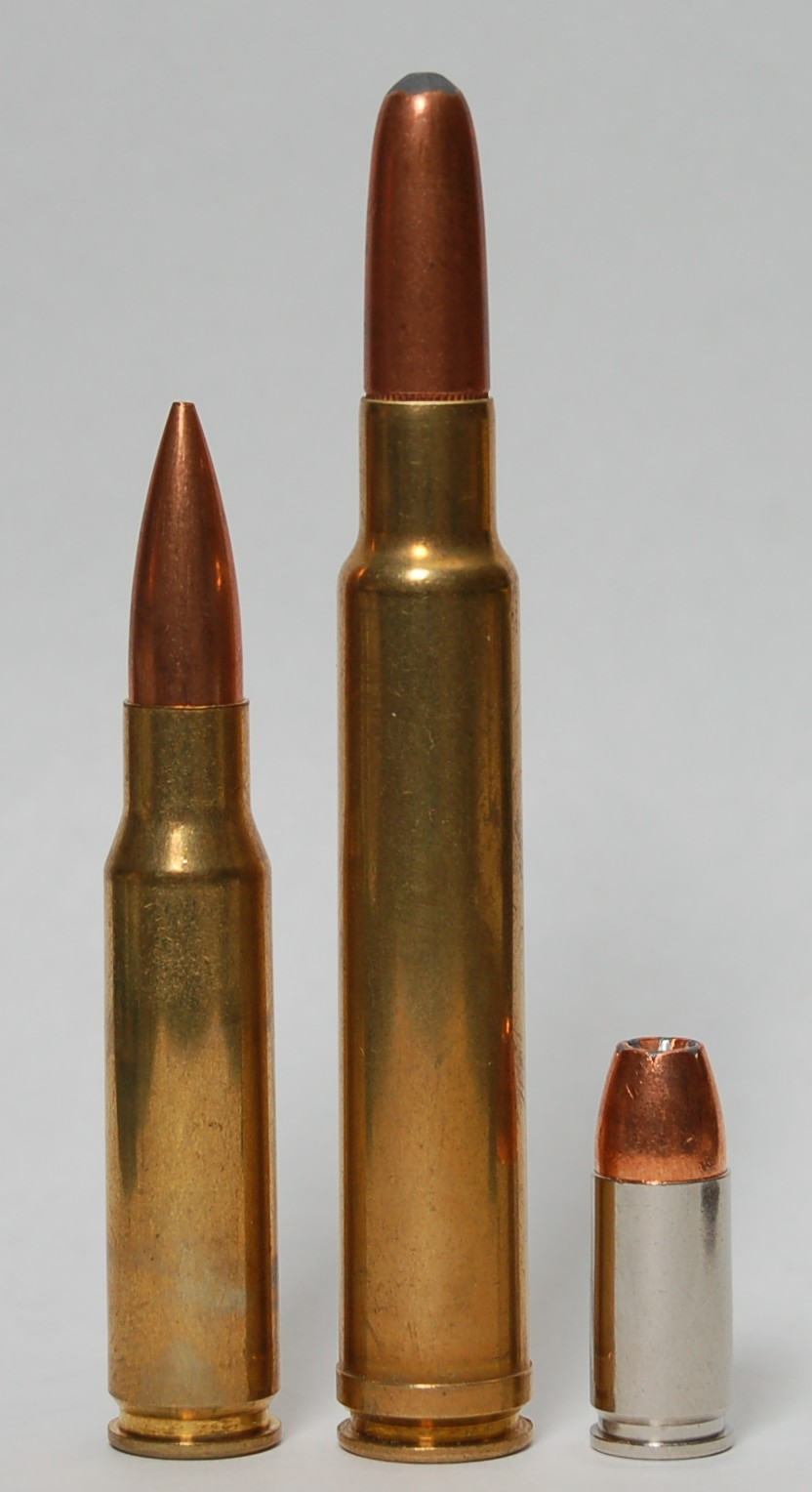
- A .340 Weatherby Magnum cartridge between a .308 Winchester cartridge and a 9×19mm cartridge
- Type: Rifle
- Place of origin: United States

Production history
- Designer: Roy Weatherby
- Designed: 1962
- Manufacturer: Weatherby
- Produced: 1963 to present

Specifications
- Parent case: .300 H&H Magnum, full length
- Case type: Rimless, bottlenecked with venturi shoulder
- Bullet diameter: .338 in (8.6 mm)
- Neck diameter: .366 in (9.3 mm)
- Shoulder diameter: .495 in (12.6 mm)
- Base diameter: .513 in (13.0 mm)
- Rim diameter: .530 in (13.5 mm)
- Rim thickness: .048 in (1.2 mm)
- Case length: 2.82 in (72 mm)
- Overall length: 3.6 in (91 mm)
- Case capacity: 98 gr H_{2}O (6.4 cm^{3})
- Primer type: large rifle magnum

Ballistic performance
Bullet mass/type	Velocity	Energy
200 gr (13 g) SP	3,221 ft/s (982 m/s)	4,607 ft⋅lbf (6,246 J)
225 gr (15 g) SP	3,066 ft/s (935 m/s)	4,696 ft⋅lbf (6,367 J)
250 gr (16 g) SP	2,963 ft/s (903 m/s)	4,873 ft⋅lbf (6,607 J)

The .340 Weatherby Magnum rifle cartridge was introduced in 1962 by creator Roy Weatherby to fill the gap between the .300 Weatherby Magnum and the .378 Weatherby Magnum, and in response to the .338 Winchester Magnum released in 1958.

The .340 Weatherby Magnum uses the same .338 in. diameter bullets as the .338 Winchester Magnum, but it does so at greater velocity than its Winchester competition. Factory ammunition pushes a 250 grain bullet to 2,940-2,950 fps. Reloaders may have trouble matching the published Weatherby velocities as Weatherby factory ammunition is loaded to maximum specifications. Weatherby no longer loads the 250gr. round-nose cartridge pictured but continues to load the 250 gr. Spire Point and 250 gr. Nosler Partition. Weatherby has also expanded their factory loads including Nosler Ballistic-tip and Barnes TSX bullets complementing the powerful cartridge. Currently A-square is the only other factory ammunition producer of the .340 Weatherby Magnum, which has led to limited popularity of the caliber. In field tests the .340 clearly outperforms the 300 Ultra mag, .338 Win mag, and even rivals the larger .375 H&H, providing a much flatter-shooting and harder-hitting performance.

This cartridge is suitable for most African game as well.

== See also ==
- Weatherby
- .338 Winchester Magnum
- .338-378 Weatherby Magnum
- List of rifle cartridges
