= Earl J. Chronister Jr. =

Earl Chronister (November 2, 1924 - July 8, 2009) was the world record holder for the 1,000 yards (910 metres) shooting championship for over 20 years.

He was born on November 2, 1924, in Dallastown, Pennsylvania to Mabel (Markey) and Earl J. Chronister Sr. Since 1952 he worked as an electrical contractor. After suffering a heart attack in 1965, he took up long-distance shooting in an effort to hunt at long range.

Winning the state shooting championship in 1965 prompted Earl Chronister to get involved in researching long range shooting and testing bullets for the Sierra Bullet Company. He went on to win several shooting championships among them the 4.3 in (11 cm) world record at 1,000 yd (910 m) and the US Army's Mile-and-a-Half shoot held at Indiantown Gap shooting a .30-378 Weatherby Magnum. The world record was broken by his protegee Robert Frey of Airville in 1993.

== External sources ==
Chronister's Passion Lead to His Record
