= Free recoil =

Term for recoil energy of a firearm not supported from behind

Free recoil / Frecoil is the recoil energy of a firearm not supported from behind. Free recoil denotes the translational kinetic energy (E_{t}) imparted to the shooter of a small arm when discharged and is expressed in joules (J), or foot-pound force (ft·lb_{f}) for non-SI units of measure. More generally, the term refers to the recoil of a free-standing firearm, in contrast to a firearm securely bolted to or braced by a massive mount or wall. Free recoil should not be confused with recoil:

- Free recoil is the given name for translational kinetic energy transmitted from a small arm to a shooter.
- Recoil is a name given for conservation of momentum as it generally applies to an everyday event.

== Free recoil and firearms ==
Free recoil, sometimes called recoil energy, is a byproduct of the propulsive force from the powder charge held within a firearm chamber (metallic cartridge firearm) or breech (gunpowder firearm). The physical event of free recoil occurs when a powder charge is deflagrated within a firearm, resulting in the conversion of chemical energy held within the powder charge into thermodynamic energy. This energy is then transferred to the base of the bullet and to the rear of the cartridge or breech, propelling the firearm rearward into the shooter while the projectile is propelled forward down the barrel, with increasing velocity, to the muzzle. The rearward energy of the firearm is the free recoil and the forward energy of the bullet is the muzzle energy.

The concept of free recoil comes from the tolerability of gross recoil energy. Trying to figure the net recoil energy of a firearm (also known as felt recoil) is a futile endeavor. Even if the recoil energy loss can be calculated, due to:

- use and effect of a muzzle brake
- recoil operated action or gas operated action
- mercury or spring recoil suppression tube
- recoil reducing butt pad and or hand grip
- damping padded shooting vest or gloves

the factors of human perception are not calculable.

Therefore, free recoil stands as a scientific measurement of recoil energy, just as the room or outside temperature is measured. The comfort level of a shooter's ability to tolerate free recoil is a personal perception. Just as it is a person's personal perception of how comfortable he or she feels to room or outside temperature.

There are many factors that determine how a shooter will perceive the free recoil of a firearm. Some of the factors are:

- body mass and body frame
- experience (how to best tolerate free recoil)
- shooting position
- recoil suppression equipment
- firearm fit and environmental stressors

== Calculating free recoil ==
There are several different ways to calculate free recoil. However, the two most common are the momentum short and long forms. Both forms will yield the same value.

The short form uses one equation as where the long form requires two equations. The long form finds the velocity for the fire arm. With the velocity known for the small arm, the free recoil of the small arm can be calculated using the translational kinetic energy equation.

- Momentum short form: $E_{tgu} = 0.5 \cdot [\tfrac {(m_p \cdot v_p) + (m_c \cdot v_c)} { 1000 }]^2 / m_{gu}$
- Momentum long form: $v_{gu} = \tfrac {(m_p \cdot v_p) + (m_c \cdot v_c)} {1000 \cdot m_{gu}}$ → $E_{tgu} = 0.5 \cdot m_{gu} \cdot v_{gu}^2\,$

Where as:

E_{tgu} is the translational kinetic energy of the small arm as expressed by the joule (J).

m_{gu} is the weight of the small arm expressed in kilograms (kg).

m_{p} is the weight of the projectile expressed in grams (g).

m_{c} is the weight of the powder charge expressed in grams (g).

v_{gu} is the velocity of the small arm expressed in meters per second (m/s).

v_{p} is the velocity of the projectile expressed in meters per second (m/s).

v_{c} is the velocity of the powder charge expressed in meters per second (m/s).

1000 is the conversion factor to set the equation equal to kilograms.

=== Calculating free recoil using SI units, example ===
Small arm: Mauser 1898 action, chambered in 7×57mm Mauser, rifle weighing 4.54 kilograms (10 pounds).

Projectile: of spitzer type, weighing 9.1 grams (140 grains), with a muzzle velocity of 823 meters per second (2,700 feet per second).

Powder charge: single base nitrocellulose, weighing 2.75 grams (42.5 grains), with a powder charge velocity of 1,585 meters per second (5,200 feet per second).

The momentum short form:

$$E_{tgu} = 0.5 \cdot [\tfrac {(m_p \cdot v_p) + (m_c \cdot v_c)} { 1000 } ]^2 / m_{gu}$$

and with the numeric values in place;

$$E_{tgu} = 0.5 \cdot [\tfrac {(9.1 \cdot 823) + (2.75 \cdot 1585)} { 1000 } ]^2 / 4.54 =$$

$$E_{tgu} = 0.5 \cdot [\tfrac {(7489.3) + (4358.75)} { 1000 } ]^2 / 4.54 =$$

$$E_{tgu} = 0.5 \cdot [\tfrac {11848.05} { 1000 } ]^2 / 4.54 =$$

$$E_{tgu} = 0.5 \cdot 11.848^2 / 4.54 = \,$$

$$E_{tgu} = 0.5 \cdot 140.367 / 4.54 = \,$$

$$E_{tgu} = 70.188 / 4.54 = \,$$

$E_{tgu} = 15.46J \,$ of free recoil

- For non-SI units of measure of energy see foot-pound force. The conversion is: 1 J = 0.737 562 ft·lb_{f}

=== Calculating free recoil using non-SI units ===
From the momentum long form in both Imperial units of measure and in an English Engineering format:

- Momentum long form: $v_{gu} = \tfrac {(m_p \cdot v_p) + (m_c \cdot v_c)} {7000} / m_{gu}$ → $E_{tgu} = \tfrac {m_{gu} \cdot v_{gu}^2}{2g_c}\,$

Whereas:

E_{tgu} is the translational kinetic energy of the small arm as expressed by the foot-pound force (ft·lb_{f}).

m_{gu} is the weight of the small arm expressed in pounds (lb).

m_{p} is the weight of the projectile expressed in grains (gr).

m_{c} is the weight of the powder charge expressed in grains (gr).

v_{gu} is the velocity of the small arm expressed in feet per second (ft/s).

v_{p} is the velocity of the projectile expressed in feet per second (ft/s).

v_{c} is the velocity of the powder charge expressed in feet per second (ft/s).

g_{c} is the dimensional constant and is the numeral coefficient of 32.1739

7000 is the conversion factor to set the equation equal to pounds.

== Calculated free recoil for small arms ==
The following free recoil energy table does not take into consideration: recoil suppression devices, or loss of energy due to auto loading mechanism. English units of measure are enclosed in parentheses.

=== Handguns ===
| Firearm, mass in g (oz) | Cartridge / projectile, mass in g (gr) | Velocity, m/s (ft/s) | Powder charge, mass in g (gr) | Free recoil | |
| Firearm, mass in g (oz) | Cartridge / projectile, mass in g (gr) | Velocity, m/s (ft/s) | Powder charge, mass in g (gr) | J | (ft·lb_{f}) |
|---|---|---|---|---|---|
| Glock 17, 905 g (31 oz) | 9mm Luger/8.0 (124) | 374 (1228) | 0.39 (6.1) | 7.7 | 5.7 |
| Glock 20, 1110 g (39 oz) | 10mm Auto/11.7 (180) | 338 (1110) | 0.5 (7.7) | 10.3 | 7.6 |
| Dan Wesson VH7, 1390 g (49 oz) | .357 Magnum/9.7 (150) | 457 (1500) | 1.0 (15.5) | 14 | 10.3 |
| S&W Model 29, 1390 g (49 oz) | .44 Magnum/15.6 (240) | 457 (1500) | 1.6 (24) | 34 | 25 |
| Springfield, Inc 1911A1, 1110 g (39 oz) | .45 ACP/14.9 (230) | 259 (850) | 0.47 (7.2) | 9.8 | 7.2 |
| STI Int, Inc. Edge 2011, 1247 g (44 oz) | .40 S&W 170PF/12.96 (200); ZeroBullets, 1.2" C.O.A.L | 259 (850) | 0.31 (4.8); Win231 WinWSP | 5.19 | 3.83 |

=== Rifles ===
| Firearm, mass in kg (lb) | Cartridge / projectile, mass in g (gr) | Velocity, m/s (ft/s) | Powder charge, mass in g (gr) | Free recoil | |
| Firearm, mass in kg (lb) | Cartridge / projectile, mass in g (gr) | Velocity, m/s (ft/s) | Powder charge, mass in g (gr) | J | (ft·lb_{f}) |
|---|---|---|---|---|---|
| AKM, 3.75 (8.2) | 7.62×39mm/7.9 (122) | 710 (2330) | 1.55 (24) | 7.19 | 5.3 |
| M16A2 rifle, 3.99 (8.5) | 5.56×45mm/3.6 (55) | 985 (3250) | 1.68 (26) | 6.44 | 4.75 |
| AK-74, 3.6 (7.5) | 5.45×39mm/3.4 (53) | 880 (2900) | 1.5 (23.7) | 3.4 | 2.5 |
| Remington Model 700, 3.6 (8) | .223 Remington/3.6 (55) | 985 (3231) | 1.6 (25.3) | 5.0 | 3.7 |
| Mauser, 4.1 (9) | 6.5×55mm Swedish/9.1 (140) | 800 (2626) | 3.0 (47) | 17.9 | 13.2 |
| CZ 550FS, 4.1 (9) | 7×57mm Mauser/9.1 (140) | 792 (2596) | 2.75 (42.5) | 16.5 | 12.2 |
| Marlin Model 1894, 2.9 (6.5) | .30-30 Winchester/11 (170) | 617 (2025) | 2.0 (31) | 17 | 12.5 |
| M14 rifle, 4.5 (9.9) | 7.62×51mm NATO/10.1 (156) | 845 (2771) | 3.1 (48) | 20 | 14.9 |
| Remington Sendero, 4.5 (10) | .308 Winchester/10.1 (156) | 845 (2771) | 3.1 (48) | 20 | 14.8 |
| Marlin Model 1894, 2.9 (6.5) | .32 H&R Magnum/6 (95) | 274 (900) | 2.0 (31) | 1.12 | 0.84 |
| Mauser M.1898 action, 4.1 (9) | 8×68mm S/14.3 (220) | 847 (2780) | 4.5 (70) | 46 | 34 |
| Remington Model 700, 4.5 (10) | 9.3×62mm (Mauser)/18.5 (285) | 710 (2330) | 1.6 (25.3) | 50 | 37 |
| Shilo Sharps 1874, 5.4 (12) | .45-70 Government/25.9 (400) | 543 (1783) | 3.6 (56) | 56 | 41 |
| Weatherby Mark V, 4.6 (10.1) | .460 Weatherby Mag./32.4 (500) | 762 (2500) | 8.1 (125) | 156 | 115 |
| A-Square Hannibal, 5.4 (12) | .500 A-Square/38.9 (600) | 762 (2500) | 7.3 (113) | 156 | 115 |
| Barrett M82 rifle, 14 (31) | .50 BMG/41.9 (647) | 902 (2960) | 15.2 (235) | 127 | 97 |
| A-Square Hannibal, 6.8 (15) | .577 Tyrannosaur/48.6 (750) | 753 (2470) | 10.4 (160) | 206 | 152 |

=== Shotguns ===
| Firearm, mass in kg (lb) | Cartridge (diam.)/ projectile, mass in g (gr) | Velocity, m/s (ft/s) | Powder charge, mass in g (oz) | Free recoil | |
| Firearm, mass in kg (lb) | Cartridge (diam.)/ projectile, mass in g (gr) | Velocity, m/s (ft/s) | Powder charge, mass in g (oz) | J | (ft·lb_{f}) |
|---|---|---|---|---|---|
| Remington SP10, 5.0 (11) | 10 gauge (19.69 mm)/64 (2 1/4 oz) | 381 (1250) | 3.0 (47) | 87 | 64 |
| Benelli Eagle II, 3.3 (7.2) | 12 gauge (18.53 mm)/32 (1 1/8 oz) | 366 (1200) | 1.3 (19.5) | 30 | 22 |
| AYA No. 1 (side-by-side), 3.0 (6.7) | 16 gauge (16.83 mm)/28 (1.0 oz) | 372 (1220) | 1.7 (26.5) | 33 | 24 |
| Beretta 686, 2.9 (6.5) | 20 gauge (15.63 mm)/25 (7/8 oz) | 372 (1220) | 1.5 (23) | 18.4 | 13.6 |
| Beretta 686, 2.8 (6.2) | 28 gauge (13.97 mm)/21 (3/4 oz) | 366 (1200) | 1.1 (17.5) | 16.7 | 12.3 |
| Remington 870, 2.7 (6.0) | .410 bore (10.41 mm)/14 (1/2 oz) | 366 (1200) | 0.9 (14) | 8.0 | 5.9 |

=== Black powder firearms ===
| Firearm, mass in kg (lb) | Cartridge / projectile, mass in g (gr) | Velocity, m/s (ft/s) | Powder charge, mass in g (gr) | Free recoil | |
| Firearm, mass in kg (lb) | Cartridge / projectile, mass in g (gr) | Velocity, m/s (ft/s) | Powder charge, mass in g (gr) | J | (ft·lb_{f}) |
|---|---|---|---|---|---|
| Shilo Sharps M.1874, 5.4 (12) | .45-70 Government (PP)/27.2 (420) | 428 (1403) | 4.9 (75) | 17.9 | 13.2 |

== See also ==
- Kinetic energy
- Momentum
- Glossary of firearms terms

See physics of firearms for a more detailed discussion.

== Resources ==
- Arthur B. Alphin, Any Shot You Want, The A-Square Handloading and Rifle Manual, On Target Press, 1996.
- Edward F. Obert, Thermodynamics, McGraw-Hill Book Co., 1948.
- McGraw-Hill Encyclopedia of Science and Technology, volume ice-lev, 9th Edition, McGraw-Hill, 2002.
