= .475 A&M Magnum =

Rifle cartridge

- Type: Rifle
- Place of origin: United States

Production history
- Designed: 1958–1959

Specifications
- Parent case: .378 Weatherby Magnum
- Case type: Belted, bottleneck
- Bullet diameter: .475 in (12.1 mm)
- Neck diameter: .502 in (12.8 mm)
- Shoulder diameter: .560 in (14.2 mm)
- Base diameter: .584 in (14.8 mm)
- Rim diameter: .533 in (13.5 mm)
- Case length: 2.90 in (74 mm)
- Overall length: 3.75 in (95 mm)
- Rifling twist: 1:14 in (360 mm)
- Primer type: Boxer large rifle

Ballistic performance
Bullet mass/type	Velocity	Energy
400 gr (26 g)	3,227 ft/s (984 m/s)	9,034 ft⋅lbf (12,248 J)
500 gr (32 g)	2,980 ft/s (910 m/s)	9,900 ft⋅lbf (13,400 J)
600 gr (39 g)	2,500 ft/s (760 m/s)	8,040 ft⋅lbf (10,900 J)
- Source(s): Barnes & Amber

The .475 A&M Magnum is a rifle cartridge developed in the United States. At the time of its development it was considered the most powerful sporting rifle cartridge ever developed. However, as the .475 A&M Magnum was a wildcat cartridge, the .460 Weatherby Magnum continued to be the most powerful commercial sporting cartridge available.

== Description ==
The cartridge and rifle were designed by the Atkinson & Marquart Rifle Co. of Prescott, Arizona, by necking up the then new .460 Weatherby Magnum to accept a .475 in (12.1 mm) diameter bullet. Fred N. Barnes, the founder of Barnes Bullets for whom the first rifle chambered for this cartridge was made, supplied the bullets. According to anecdotes, Fred Barnes gathered a group of people to demonstrate the rifle. The rifle was fired at the base of a small tree which was uprooted while Fred Barnes who had been shooting from a crouched position on a gravel bed had slid a few feet and ended on his back due to the recoil.

The .475 A&M Magnum was never available commercially, and was only Barnes Bullets and Custom Brass and Bullets provided bullet for the cartridge. Only a small number of rifles have been chambered for this cartridge. Brass is easily fireformed using .460 Weatherby Magnum brass. Dies are available from Custom Brass and Bullets.

== See also ==
- List of cartridges by caliber
- List of rifle cartridges
- 12 mm caliber

== Notes ==
- Barnes, Frank C., ed. by John T. Amber. ".475 A&M Magnum", in Cartridges of the World, pp. 142–3. Northfield, IL: DBI Books, 1972. ISBN 0-695-80326-3.
