= .460 Weatherby Magnum =

Rifle cartridge

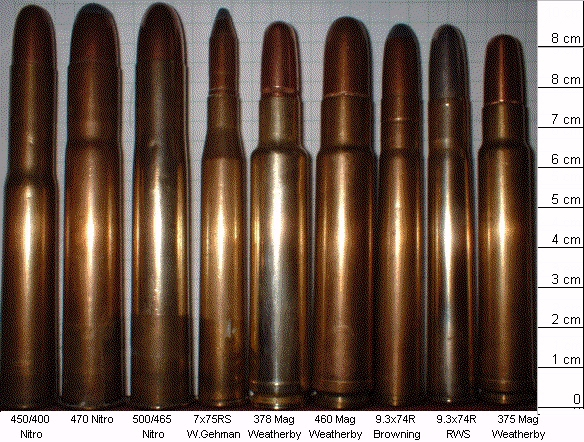
- .460 fourth from right
- Type: Rifle
- Place of origin: United States

Production history
- Designer: Roy Weatherby
- Designed: 1957
- Manufacturer: Weatherby Inc.
- Produced: 1959–present

Specifications
- Parent case: .378 Weatherby Magnum
- Case type: belted, bottlenecked
- Bullet diameter: .458 in (11.6 mm)
- Neck diameter: .481 in (12.2 mm)
- Shoulder diameter: .560 in (14.2 mm)
- Base diameter: .582 in (14.8 mm)
- Rim diameter: .579 in (14.7 mm)
- Rim thickness: .063 in (1.6 mm)
- Case length: 2.913 in (74.0 mm)
- Overall length: 3.65 in (93 mm)
- Case capacity: 141.1 gr H_{2}O (9.14 cm^{3})
- Rifling twist: 1 in 16 in (410 mm)
- Primer type: Large rifle magnum
- Maximum pressure: 65,000 psi (450 MPa)

Ballistic performance
Bullet mass/type	Velocity	Energy
500 gr (32 g) FMJ	2,600 ft/s (790 m/s)	7,504 ft⋅lbf (10,174 J)
500 gr (32 g) Round nose	2,600 ft/s (790 m/s)	7,504 ft⋅lbf (10,174 J)
450 gr (29 g) Truncated solid	2,660 ft/s (810 m/s)	7,072 ft⋅lbf (9,588 J)
- Test barrel length: 26 in (660 mm); Source: Weatherby

The .460 Weatherby Magnum is a belted, bottlenecked rifle cartridge, developed by Roy Weatherby in 1957. The cartridge is based on the .378 Weatherby Magnum necked up to accept the .458-inch (11.6 mm) bullet. The original .378 Weatherby Magnum parent case was inspired by the .416 Rigby. The .460 Weatherby Magnum was designed as an African dangerous game rifle cartridge for the hunting of heavy, thick skinned dangerous game.

Prior to the Weatherby's arrival, the .600 Nitro Express had been the most powerful cartridge but the .460 Weatherby Magnum eclipsed this, and was the world's most powerful commercially available sporting cartridge for 29 years until the advent of the .700 Nitro Express.

The .460 launches a 500-grain (32 g) bullet at a chronographed velocity of 2,700 ft/s (820 m/s) from a 26-inch (660 mm) barrel, measuring 8,100 ft⋅lbf (11,000 J) of muzzle energy.

== Cartridge history ==
Roy Weatherby had expected the .378 Weatherby Magnum to make some headway in the African continent but believed that his cartridge was being bypassed for low-velocity, big-bore cartridges by professional hunters who he felt were resistant to change. Furthermore, new regulations prohibiting the hunting of heavy, thick skinned, dangerous game with sub-.40 caliber (10.16 mm) cartridges were being enacted in some African countries. These regulations would essentially ban the use of all previous Weatherby cartridges for the hunting of elephant, African Cape buffalo and rhinoceros.

In response to these factors, Weatherby believed that it was necessary to provide hunters a Weatherby cartridge that could be used to hunt African dangerous game in the countries which had legislated against hunting with sub-.40 caliber rifles. He accomplished this by necking up the .378 Weatherby Magnum case to accept a .458 caliber bullet. He named the new cartridge the ".460 Weatherby Magnum". The first rifles for the .460 Weatherby Magnum were built on Brevex Magnum Mauser action.

However, Weatherby was not the first cartridge designer to neck up the .378 Weatherby Magnum to .45 caliber (11.6 mm). That distinction belongs to John Buhmiller, a gunsmith and hunter from Montana. Buhmiller named his cartridge the ".45 Weatherby". He had success with the cartridge in Africa shooting Cape buffalo and rogue elephants in 1956, a year before Weatherby began work on his own .45-caliber cartridge.

Norma Precision of Sweden was the first and only manufacturer of .460 Weatherby Magnum cases and ammunition which carried the Weatherby name and has done so under contract from Weatherby. During Weatherby's partnership with J.P. Sauer/Dynamit-Nobel, production at Norma ceased and shifted to RWS, a wholly owned subsidiary of Dynamit-Nobel. However, RWS did not tool up in time to produce the .460 Weatherby Magnum cartridge and in the end only produced substandard .300 Weatherby ammunition before production once again moved to Norma.

DuPont at one time shipped DuPont No. 4350 powder to Norma Projektilfabrik for the reloading of Weatherby ammunition. But some time later Norma was able to source a powder with similar burn characteristics locally which was used instead of DuPont's IMR 4350. Norma would later purchase the company and rename the powder Norma 204.

== Design and specifications ==
The .460 Weatherby Magnum is no longer considered a proprietary cartridge as the Sporting Arms and Ammunition Manufacturers' Institute (SAAMI) established voluntary specifications for the cartridge in January 1994. The Commission Internationale Permanente pour l'Epreuve des Armes à Feu Portatives (CIP) has also provided specifications for the cartridge to which all member states must comply when exporting, importing or manufacturing ammunition.

=== Cartridge design ===
The .460 Weatherby Magnum case uses a necked up .378 Weatherby Magnum case. Although the .378 Weatherby Magnum case was inspired by the .416 Rigby case, it is considered a unique case which has gone on to serve as the parent cartridge of several high performance cartridges. The .460 Weatherby Magnum requires a case with the large propellant capacity necessary to propel a 500 gr (32 g) bullet at 2,700 ft/s (820 m/s). To accomplish this design goal, the cartridge case has a capacity able to hold 141.1 gr. of water (9.17 cm^{3}). Frequently the powder charges for the .460 Weatherby Magnum can weigh well in excess of 120 gr (7.8 g); in comparison a powder charge for the .458 Winchester Magnum rarely weighs over 80 gr (5.2 g).

The .460 Weatherby Magnum is designed to headspace on its belt. The close chamber tolerance of Weatherby rifles indicate that these rifles do indeed headspace on the belt rather than the shoulder, unlike most modern belted cartridges which headspace on the shoulder regardless of the belt; the few exceptions being the .375 H&H Magnum and the .300 H&H Magnum. SAAMI recommended chamber dimensional tolerance range does allow for the headspacing to take place on the shoulder if need be.

=== Cartridge dimensions and specifications ===
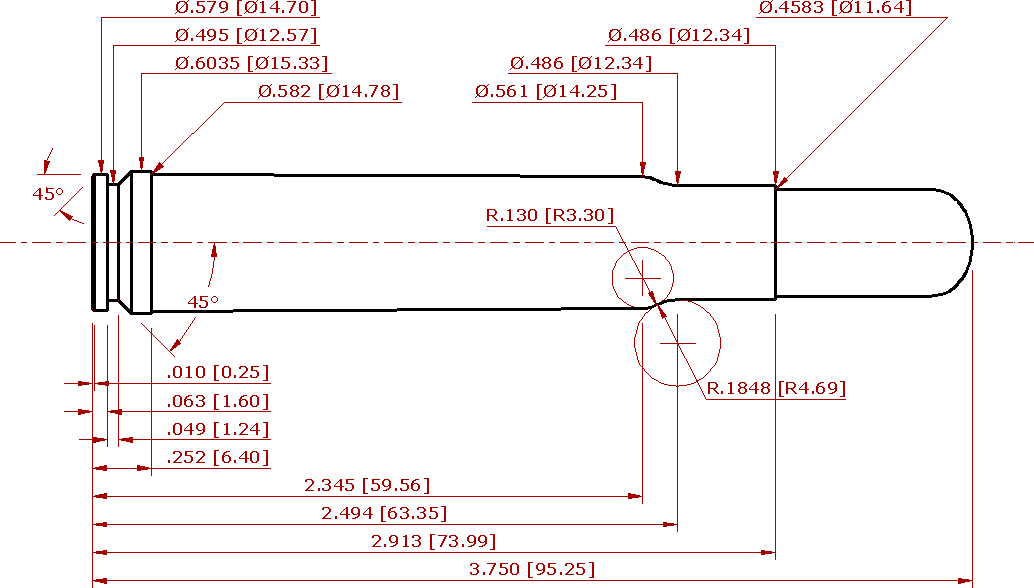
SAAMI compliant .460 Weatherby Magnum cartridge schematic: All dimensions in inches [millimeters].

Diagram reflects SAAMI dimensions for the .460 Weatherby Magnum. CIP dimensions for the r1 (inside shoulder radius), r2 (outside shoulder radius), L1 (height from base to shoulder), L2 (height from base to neck), S (shoulder angle intercepts the center line) and the α dimensional value (shoulder angle) conflict with SAAMI dimensions. This is due to how the L1 and L2 values are defined in relation to the centers of the r1 and r2 dimensional values by CIP. The following table provides the conflicting values provided by SAAMI and CIP.

Cartridge dimension and specification value conflicts between SAAMI and CIP
Dimension / specification	CIP dimension index	SAAMI value	CIP value
Body to shoulder radius	r1	.130 in (3.3 mm)	3.30 mm (0.130 in)
Neck to shoulder radius	r2	.1848 in (4.69 mm)	4.72 mm (0.186 in)
Base to shoulder length	L1	2.345 in (59.6 mm)	60.39 mm (2.378 in)
Base to neck length	L2	2.494 in (63.3 mm)	62.17 mm (2.448 in)
Angle between shoulder	α	Does not provide	56°15'56"
Length to shoulder vertex	S	Does not provide	73.71 mm (2.902 in)
Pressure	P_{max}	65,000 psi (4,500 bar)	4,400 bar (64,000 psi)

Like all Weatherby cartridges, the .460 Weatherby Magnum cartridge has a double radius shoulder where the body and the neck are connected with a continuously curving shoulder; the curve of which reverses at the point of tangency. SAAMI defines the length to the shoulder as the demarcation point where the bottom of inside curvature radius (corresponding roughly to CIP's r1) of the shoulder begins and the length to the neck as where the outside curvature radius (approximating CIP's r2) meets the neck. However, CIP does not define the location of the centers of the r1 and r2 whereas SAAMI provides this as being in inline with the length to the shoulder (inside radius) and length to neck (outside radius). This is due to the CIP treatment of r1 and r2 values as fillet radii as they do with many other cartridges.

=== Chamber dimensions and specifications ===
SAAMI compliant .460 Weatherby Magnum chamber schematic: All dimensions in inches [millimeters].

SAAMI recommends a maximum chamber pressure rating of 65,000 psi (4,500 bar) while CIP provides a maximum chamber pressure rating of 4,400 bar (64,000 psi).

Weatherby no longer provides a long leade (freebore) for the cartridge. Currently Weatherby provides .756 inches (19.2 mm) of freebore for the .460 Weatherby in the Weatherby Mark V rifle. CIP recommends that rifling commence at .975 in (24.8 mm) from the case mouth reflecting the longer leade provided by Weatherby in the early 1960s. SAAMI recommends the present leade provided by Weatherby of .756 inches (19.2 mm).

Twist rate is given as 1 in 16 by Weatherby which would stabilize bullets up to 600-grain (39 g) and mono-metal bullets. Weatherby provides a six-groove contour No. 4 barrel for the .460 Weatherby Magnum. Ø land is given at .450 in (11.4 mm) and Ø groove is .458 in (11.6 mm). The recommended land arc width by both SAAMI and CIP is .175 in (4.4 mm).

== Performance ==
The .460 Weatherby Magnum cartridge is very accurate despite its size. Weatherby guarantees a 1.5 MOA (44mm/100m) accuracy for this cartridge in a Weatherby rifle. Typically a full-metal-jacketed or monolithic solid type bullet will penetrate more than 40 in (1.0 m) when impacting a dangerous game animal such as the Cape buffalo or African elephant. The .460 Weatherby Magnum has few peers for stopping dangerous African game.

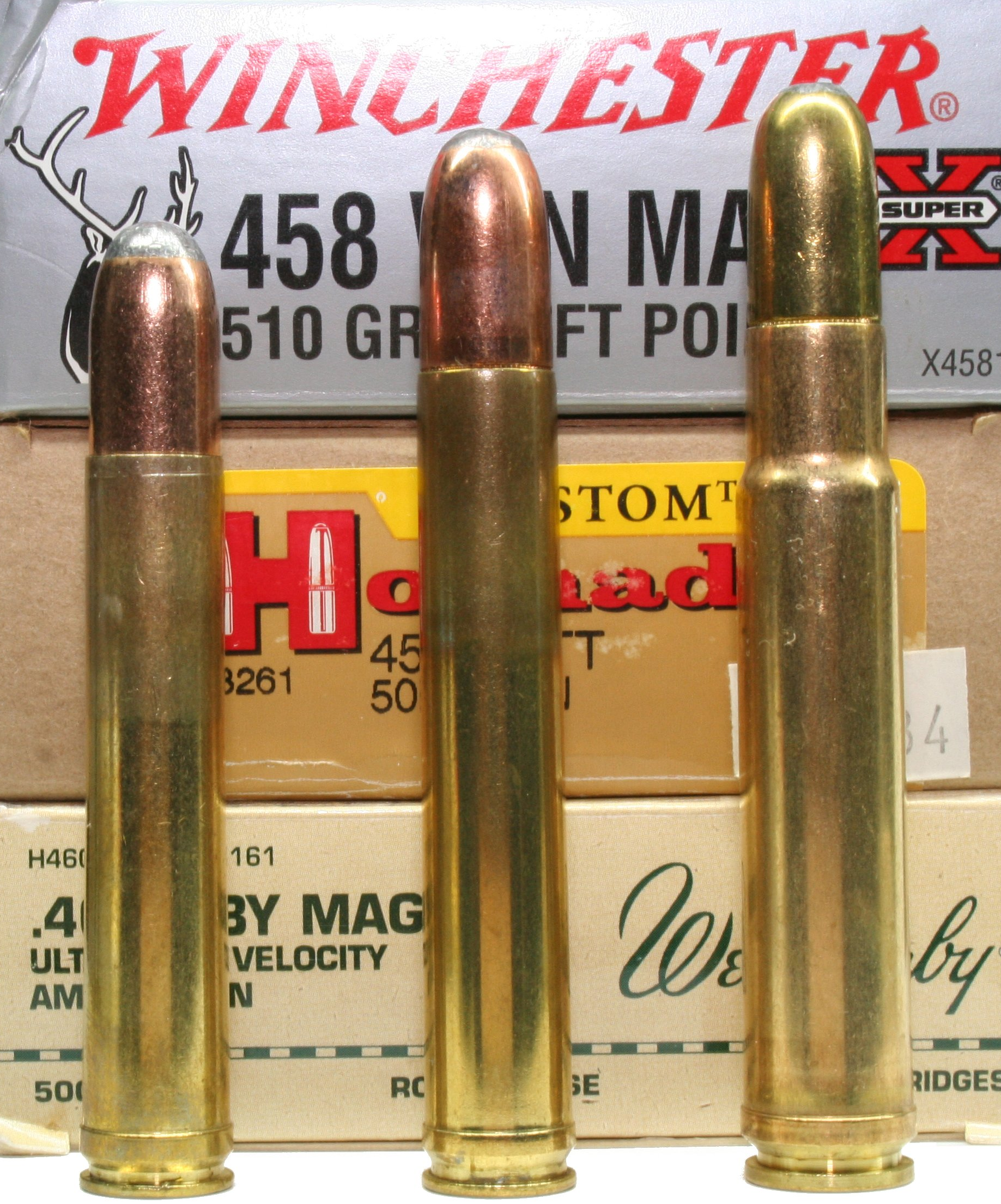
.458 Win. Mag., .458 Lott and a .460 Wby. Mag. for comparison

Compared to its contemporaries, the 460 Weatherby Magnum has more energy at 150 yards than the .458 Winchester Magnum does at the muzzle and at 100 yards more energy than the .458 Lott with factory ammunition. The .460 Weatherby Magnum provides a significant step up in performance over other production .458 caliber (11.6 mm) cartridges. The increased performance is realized in terms of both remaining energy and extended range.

Comparison of the 500 gr (32 g) factory loadings of the .458 Winchester Magnum, 458 Lott and the .460 Weatherby Magnum
Cartridge	Criteria	Muzzle	50-yard (46 m)	100-yard (91 m)	150-yard (140 m)	200-yard (180 m)	250-yard (230 m)	300-yard (270 m)
.458 Winchester Magnum Hornady 500 grains (32 g) DGS	Velocity	2,140 ft/s (650 m/s)	2,007 ft/s (612 m/s)	1,879 ft/s (573 m/s)	1,757 ft/s (536 m/s)	1,641 ft/s (500 m/s)	1,531 ft/s (467 m/s)	1,429 ft/s (436 m/s)
.458 Winchester Magnum Hornady 500 grains (32 g) DGS	Energy	5,084 ft⋅lbf (6,893 J)	4,472 ft⋅lbf (6,063 J)	3,921 ft⋅lbf (5,316 J)	3,428 ft⋅lbf (4,648 J)	2,990 ft⋅lbf (4,050 J)	2,603 ft⋅lbf (3,529 J)	2,267 ft⋅lbf (3,074 J)
.458 Lott Hornady 500 grains (32 g) DGS	Velocity	2,300 ft/s (700 m/s)	2,162 ft/s (659 m/s)	2,029 ft/s (618 m/s)	1,900 ft/s (580 m/s)	1,777 ft/s (542 m/s)	1,660 ft/s (510 m/s)	1,549 ft/s (472 m/s)
.458 Lott Hornady 500 grains (32 g) DGS	Energy	5,873 ft⋅lbf (7,963 J)	5,190 ft⋅lbf (7,040 J)	4,568 ft⋅lbf (6,193 J)	4,007 ft⋅lbf (5,433 J)	3,505 ft⋅lbf (4,752 J)	3,058 ft⋅lbf (4,146 J)	2,663 ft⋅lbf (3,611 J)
.460 Weatherby Magnum Hornady 500 grains (32 g) DGS	Velocity	2,600 ft/s (790 m/s)	2,452 ft/s (747 m/s)	2,309 ft/s (704 m/s)	2,171 ft/s (662 m/s)	2,037 ft/s (621 m/s)	1,908 ft/s (582 m/s)	1,784 ft/s (544 m/s)
.460 Weatherby Magnum Hornady 500 grains (32 g) DGS	Energy	7,505 ft⋅lbf (10,175 J)	6,673 ft⋅lbf (9,047 J)	5,917 ft⋅lbf (8,022 J)	5,230 ft⋅lbf (7,090 J)	4,605 ft⋅lbf (6,244 J)	4,040 ft⋅lbf (5,480 J)	3,535 ft⋅lbf (4,793 J)

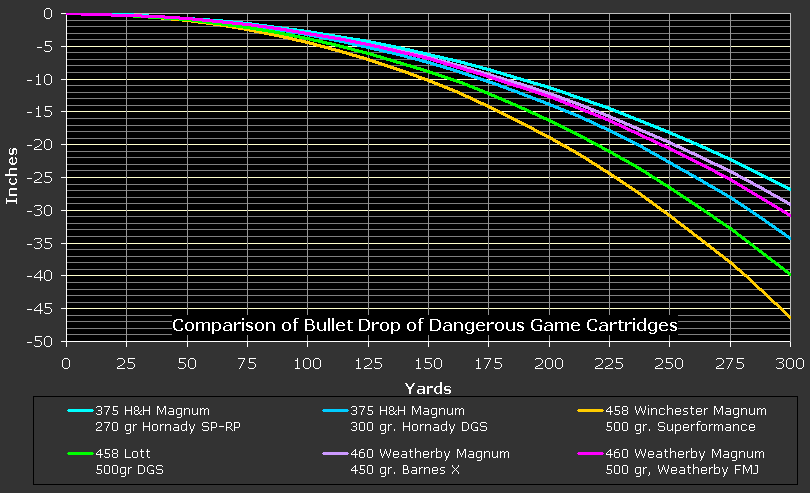
Comparison of trajectories of the .375 H&H Magnum and the .460 Weatherby Magnum

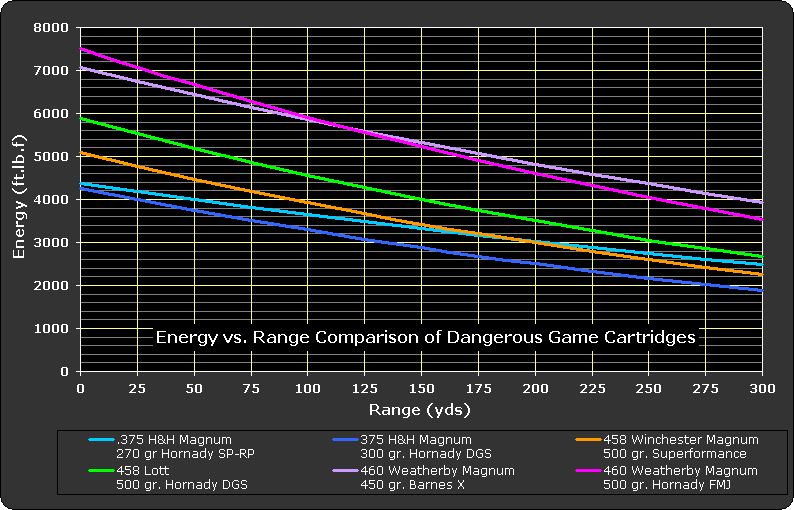
Energy vs. range comparison between the .375 H&H Magnum, .458 Winchester Magnum, .458 Lott and the .460 Weatherby Magnum

The .460 Weatherby Magnum, like the .375 H&H Magnum, is a relatively flat shooting cartridge. The maximum point blank range (MPBR) for the 450-grain (29 g) Weatherby load is 258-yard (236 m). The 500-grain (32 g) Weatherby factory ammunition has a maximum point blank range of 245-yard (224 m). These trajectories compare well with those of the .375 H&H Magnum. At 200 yd (180 m) Hornady's Interlock .375 H&H Magnum's 270 gr (17 g) bullet drops 11.3 in (29 cm) while Hornady's DGX 300 gr (19 g) bullet drops 13.8 in (35 cm). In contrast the .460 Weatherby Magnum's 450 gr (29 g) (B460450TSX) drops 12.3 in (31 cm) and the 500 gr (32 g) (H460500FJ) drops 12.7 in (32 cm). The .460 Weatherby Magnum, however, averages over 75% greater energy than the .375 H&H Magnum.

Compared to the more popular .458 Winchester Magnum and the .458 Lott, the .460 Weatherby Magnum provides a flatter trajectory, dropping less than 10-inch (25 cm) at 300-yard (270 m) when sighted in at 200-yard (180 m) with the 450 gr. Barnes TSX Weatherby ammunition. With the 500 gr (32 g) FMJ or RN Weatherby ammunition bullet drop is 11-inch (28 cm) at the same range. The .458 Winchester Magnum and the .458 Lott have a 206-yard (188 m) and 220-yard (200 m) MPBR respectively in comparison. The 500 gr (32 g) FMJ or RN Weatherby ammunition shoot to the same point of impact, which is necessary in a dangerous game cartridge as hunters may need to switch from solids to soft round nose rounds depending on the circumstances and game being hunted. This is due to Weatherby's (Norma) factory loaded ammunition using Hornady's DGS and DGX bullets which have identical G1 ballistic coefficients of .295.

The ability of the .460 Weatherby to carry the energy and velocity required to take heavy, tough skinned dangerous game combined with the flatter trajectories it provides, gives the shooter the ability to take game species at longer ranges than its competition. The stand-off ability assures a greater margin of safety when hunting dangerous game species as the hunter need not get as close to the game as with other cartridges. Furthermore, this lessens the need to compensate for bullet drop and target size. However, for practical reasons, most dangerous game are shot at close ranges of less than 60 yd (55 m).

Bullets available for the .460 Weatherby Magnum range from 300–600-grain (19–39 g). Velocities with these bullets vary from 2,500-foot-per-second (760 m/s) with the 600-grain (39 g) bullet to 3,100-foot-per-second (940 m/s) with the 300-grain (19 g) bullet. The good sectional density and ballistic coefficients of these bullets, particularly spitzer bullets available, give the cartridge the ability to conserve velocity in flight and provide deep penetration on game. The wide range of bullet weights available and the ability tailor the performance the .460 Weatherby Magnum gives the cartridge a performance envelope unmatched by most cartridges. The combination of velocity and bullets of very good sectional density contributes to the .460 Weatherby Magnum's excellent penetration on game provided the toughest bullets are employed for the task.

As with other most other cartridges, the Weatherby's performance with mono-metal bullets is slightly poorer than with conventional bullets. Mono-metal bullets tend to be longer for a given bullet weight than conventional lead core bullets. For this reason, the mono-metal bullets similar to the Barnes TSX may have to be seated more deeply into the case displacing volume which could be filled with the propellant. A loss of velocity of 50–100-foot-per-second (15–30 m/s) can be expected with these mono-metal bullets. Likewise bullets which have a higher specific gravity than lead, such as the tungsten core Speer African Grand Slam solids being shorter than conventional FMJ bullets will allow for more powder capacity and therefore a higher velocity.

The performance level of the Weatherby cartridge comes at a cost: recoil. The recoil of the .460 Weatherby Magnum is severe. The cartridge generates close to 100 ft⋅lbf (140 J) of energy. This is in keeping with Newton's third law of motion: Every action has an equal and opposite reaction. As performance levels rise, so does the recoil. Put into perspective the recoil of the .460 Weatherby is 120% greater than the .375 H&H Magnum, 50% greater than the .458 Winchester Magnum and 20% greater than the .458 Lott.

The .460 Weatherby Magnum compares well with the classic English big bore cartridges; it exceeds all these cartridges in velocity, energy, trajectory and penetration. Cartridges such as the .500 Jeffery, .500 Nitro Express, .505 Gibbs, .577 Nitro Express, .600 Nitro Express do however provide a larger diameter bullet while the latter two cartridges are also capable of launching heavier bullets than the .460 Weatherby Magnum. At present only the modern classic .700 Nitro Express exceeds the performance of the .460 Weatherby and then in only a single category: energy. Cartridges such as the .475 A&M Magnum, .500 A-Square, and the .550 Magnum which are based on the .460 Weatherby Magnum can exceed the performance of the parent cartridge, however, these are considered wildcat and proprietary cartridges.

== Sporting use ==
The .460 Weatherby Magnum is primarily a thick skinned dangerous game cartridge designed to provide the ultimate in stopping power against African elephant, African buffalo, hippopotamus and the rhinoceros. When loaded to its full potential it has little use outside this primary use - although it can be used to hunt any species, there are far better cartridge choices for other game animals.

=== Thick-skinned big game ===
When loaded to its full potential it has more than the required energy necessary to drive 450–600-grain (29–39 g) bullets into the elephant's vital organs from any angle provided that the bullet is up to the task. Generally, elephants require solid bullets especially when head-shots are taken. Monolithic bullets such as the A-Square Monolithic Solid, Barnes Banded Solid, Supreme Nosler Solid and more conventional tougher FMJ bullets such as the Hornady DGS are good choices as they are able to withstand stresses placed on the bullets by the velocity of the .460 Weatherby Magnum. At the 250 yd (230 m) mark, the .460 Weatherby has enough remaining energy and velocity to make quick kills on elephant. At this range its impact energy is comparable to that of the .458 Winchester Magnum at 65 yd (59 m) However, as elephant hunting is usually a close range affair where 90% of the shooting situations fall within 60 yd (55 m) the fact that the .460 Weatherby can fell an elephant at long ranges is mostly an academic argument at best.

Bullets in the 400–500-grain (26–32 g) range are effective for hunting African cape buffalo and rhinoceros. A combination of solids and expanding bullets may be used against these big game. Expanding bullets should be of the controlled expansion variety. Rapidly expanding bullets are to be avoided. A-Square Dead Tough, Barnes TSX, Hornady DGX and similar toughly constructed expanding bullets are recommended. As with the solid bullets, expanding bullets for the cartridge should be rated to perform well at .460 Weatherby velocities.

The .460 Weatherby is one of the very few rifle cartridges approved by the International Whaling Commission for the harvesting of whales. The cartridge was deemed to have the penetration necessary to penetrate to the brain stem to provide a quick kill on whales. The Makah people of the Pacific Northwest have used this rifle cartridge for decades hunting whales.

=== Other big game ===
The .460 Weatherby is overly powerful for lion or leopard. Lion are thin skinned and weigh no more than 600 lb (270 kg) while leopards weigh no more than 250 lb (110 kg). When the .460 Weatherby is used for hunting leopard or lion, a rapidly expanding bullet is normally used. Bullets ideal for lion or leopard begin with the 300-grain (19 g) bullets. A-Square's Lion Load, a fragmenting 465-or-500-grain (30.1 or 32.4 g) soft point is one such load appropriate for the big cats. Apart from the A-Square Lion Load bullets ranging in weight from 300–400 gr (19–26 g) are better used on lion and leopard. Since the .460 Weatherby can drive these bullets at over 3,000 ft/s (910 m/s), and the large felidae are susceptible to hydrostatic shock, these lighter weight bullets in relation to the caliber may provide the best option if the .460 is chosen for the big cats. However, as no mainstream ammunition manufacturer loads these bullets, tailoring such loads for lion or leopard is strictly an option available only to the handloader or for those willing to have custom ammunition made to order.

The capability of the .460 Weatherby Magnum to hold flatter trajectories with appropriate bullets provides the cartridge the ability to take African plains game at distances beyond 250-yard (230 m) with no holdover adds to the versatility of .460 Weatherby Magnum as an all round African game cartridge. However, while the .460 Weatherby has the capacity to take such game species, there can be little doubt of the fact that there are more suitable cartridge choices for these species with far less recoil.

North American big game also does not require the full power of the .460 Weatherby Magnum. Harvesting of bison, elk, moose and brown bear can however be accomplished by reducing the performance of the cartridge to match the requirements. The .460 Weatherby Magnum cartridge has the flexibility to be loaded to duplicate the performance of the .45-70 Government to the .450 Rigby - and have significantly lower recoil.

== Rifles and ammunition ==
Due to the recoil energy and recoil velocity of the cartridge rifles designed for the .460 Weatherby Magnum and other cartridges in its class demand particular attention with regard to their design. Most modern rifles designed for cartridges of this class incorporate design features that reduce the felt recoil to the shooter and improve durability. Rifles chambered for the .460 Weatherby Magnum require close mating of metal to stock. This can be accomplished by properly bedding the action to the stock. Recoil lugs and crossbolts serve the purpose of preventing a movement differential between the action and the stock which could lead to further loosening between the action and the stock or splitting the stock. Proper bedding and properly installed recoil lugs and crossbolts can go a long way in preserving the integrity of the firearm chambered in cartridges such as the .460 Weatherby Magnum as functional implements.

The Weatherby Mark V is the most popular rifle chambered for the .460 Weatherby Magnum cartridge. The rifle stock is engineered to minimize the felt recoil of heavy recoiling cartridges. The California Style Monte Carlo stock's slanting comb will under recoil push away from the shooter's face. The rifle stock is also designed with a generous cast off to help tame the heavy recoil of the .460 Weatherby Magnum. The rifle uses an aluminum bedding block and recoil lugs to prevent any movement between the stock and the action. At a point of time the .460 Weatherby Magnum was offered for sale as an over the counter item in a few Mark V rifle lines, however, at present it is only available in the Mark V Deluxe. The Weatherby Custom Shop does offer the rifle in a few lines such as the Crown Custom, Dangerous Game Rifle (DGR) and the Safari Custom. All the over the counter and custom shop rifles are built on the Mark V action which is regarded by many as one of the strongest rifle actions available. The first .460 Weatherbys were built on Magnum Mauser actions but these were found wanting due to the higher pressures generated by Weatherby cartridges. The Mark V action is able to contain 200,000 psi (14,000 bar) pressure.

A-Square currently offers rifles chambered .460 Weatherby Magnum in the Hannibal (right handed) and Caesar (left handed) lines. The rifles are based on the Enfield P14 design and like the Weatherbys are designed to minimize felt recoil. The rifles are ruggedly build to perform well with hard recoiling cartridges such as the .460 Weatherby Magnum, .500 A-Square, .577 Tyrannosaur. Dumoulin Herstal of Belgium manufactures rifles for the cartridge in their proprietary A2000/LM Long Magnum Mauser action White Hunter rifle line. The Dumoulin White Hunter is also available in .416 Rigby, .500 Jeffery and .505 Gibbs. Apart from these companies, several custom rifle makers such as Ballard Arms and Empire Rifles provide custom rifles in this chambering.

Weatherby ammunition is billed as Ultra Velocity Ammunition by Weatherby. Typically, Weatherby cartridges exhibit velocities greater than 200–300 ft/s (61–91 m/s) over the more popular similar caliber cartridges. Early Weatherby ammunition was loaded to near maximum pressures. Since then, however, Weatherby has backed off from these pressures. The resulting factory ammunition is about 100 ft/s (30 m/s) slower than early Weatherby Ammunition.

.460 Weatherby Magnum Ammunition
Ammunition	Bullet	Muzzle velocity	Muzzle energy	MPBR/zero	Notes
Weatherby H460500FJ	Hornady 500 gr (32 g) DGS	2,600 ft/s (790 m/s)	7,505 ft⋅lbf (10,175 J)	245 yd (224 m)/209 yd (191 m)	Load used Hornady FMJ^{†}, FMJ-IB^{†} now DGS
Weatherby H460500RN	Hornady 500 gr (32 g) DGX	2,600 ft/s (790 m/s)	7,505 ft⋅lbf (10,175 J)	245 yd (224 m)/209 yd (191 m)	Load used Hornady RN^{†}, RN-IB^{†} now DGX
Weatherby B460450TSX	Barnes 450 gr (29 g) TSX	2,660 ft/s (810 m/s)	7,072 ft⋅lbf (9,588 J)	258 yd (236 m)/219 yd (200 m)	Currently in production
A-Square Triad	A-Square 500 gr (32 g) MS, DT, LL	2,580 ft/s (790 m/s)	7,390 ft⋅lbf (10,020 J)	251 yd (230 m)/213 yd (195 m)	Currently in production
Conley Precision	Barnes 350 gr (23 g) TSX	2,950 ft/s (900 m/s)	6,762 ft⋅lbf (9,168 J)	273 yd (250 m)/233 yd (213 m)	Currently in production
Conley Precision	Swift 400 gr (26 g) A-Frame	2,780 ft/s (850 m/s)	6,863 ft⋅lbf (9,305 J)	256 yd (234 m)/218 yd (199 m)	Currently in production
Conley Precision	Barnes 450 gr (29 g) BS	2,700 ft/s (820 m/s)	7,283 ft⋅lbf (9,874 J)	261 yd (239 m)/222 yd (203 m)	Currently in production
Conley Precision	Barnes 450 gr (29 g) TSX	2,700 ft/s (820 m/s)	7,283 ft⋅lbf (9,874 J)	262 yd (240 m)/222 yd (203 m)	Currently in production
Conley Precision	Swift 450 gr (29 g) A-Frame	2,700 ft/s (820 m/s)	7,283 ft⋅lbf (9,874 J)	257 yd (235 m)/219 yd (200 m)	Currently in production
Conley Precision	Barnes 500 gr (32 g) BS	2,660 ft/s (810 m/s)	7,854 ft⋅lbf (10,649 J)	260 yd (240 m)/221 yd (202 m)	Currently in production
Conley Precision	Barnes 500 gr (32 g) TSX	2,660 ft/s (810 m/s)	7,854 ft⋅lbf (10,649 J)	261 yd (239 m)/222 yd (203 m)	Currently in production
Conley Precision	Hornady 500 gr (32 g) FMJ-RN	2,650 ft/s (810 m/s)	7,795 ft⋅lbf (10,569 J)	250 yd (230 m)/213 yd (195 m)	Currently in production
Conley Precision	Hornady 500 gr (32 g) IL-RN	2,650 ft/s (810 m/s)	7,795 ft⋅lbf (10,569 J)	249 yd (228 m)/212 yd (194 m)	Currently in production
Conley Precision	Swift 500 gr (32 g) A-Frame	2,650 ft/s (810 m/s)	7,795 ft⋅lbf (10,569 J)	256 yd (234 m)/218 yd (199 m)	Currently in production
Temperature: 59 °F (15 °C) Altitude: 500 ft (150 m)^{†} Discontinued

Currently ammunition is available from A-Square, Conley Precision Cartridge and Weatherby (Norma) among others. Factory ammunition is loaded with 350-to-600-grain (23 to 39 g) bullets. Factory ammunition are relatively expensive costing between $6.00 and 8.50 per cartridge.

== Accessories ==
Although most elephant guns are equipped with open sights the typical Weatherby Mark V rifle chambered for the .460 Weatherby Magnum does not come equipped with open sights. Instead they are drilled and tapped for scope mounts. The cartridge's performance even at 200 yd (180 m) leaves enough energy necessary to bring down large dangerous thick skinned game. At these ranges, telescopic sights have a greater advantage than open sights. The stock itself is designed for with the intent of providing the shooter a higher line of sight which is consistent with the use of telescopic sights.

Weatherby rifles such as the Dangerous Game Rifle and other Weatherby factory custom offerings are provided with open sights. Open sights tend to sight in quicker than scoped rifles and for this reason open sighted rifles are preferred by hunters for back-up work—when the hunter or guide must mount and discharge their firearm to ensure a charging game animal does not injure a client or to deliver a killing blow to a wounded game animal. It also has the added benefit of preventing the hunter from getting their eyebrow cut by the scope, which is not uncommon with a firearm with as much recoil as the .460 Weatherby Magnum.

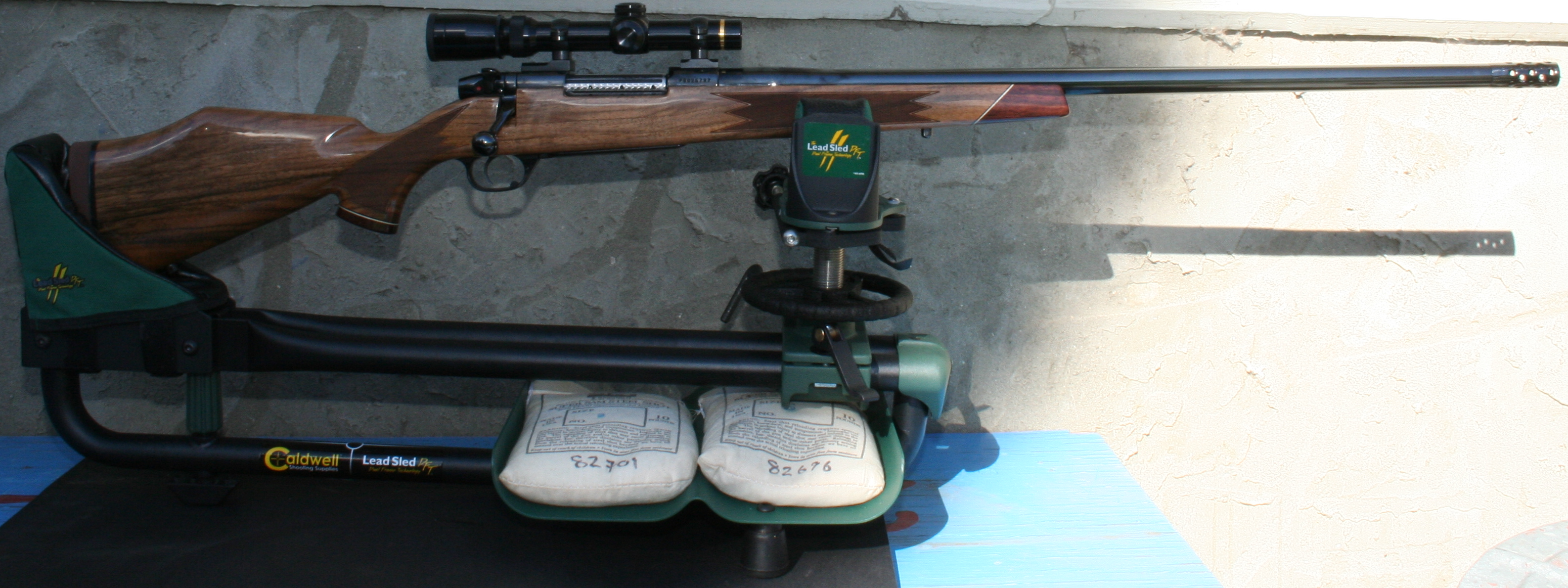
Weatherby Mk. V in .460 Wby. Mag. equipped with an Accubrake mounted on a Caldwell Lead Sled loaded with 20-pound (9.1 kg) of lead ready for sighting in

The recoil of the .460 Weatherby Magnum presents a problem for many shooters when shooting a cartridge of this size. Even with a 12 lb (5.4 kg) rifle (scope, base, rings and cartridges included) the recoil against the shooter's shoulder is measured at 100 ft⋅lbf (140 J). Most rifles chambered in .30-06 Springfield develop an average of 20 ft⋅lbf (27 J) of free recoil. Recently Weatherby has offered some reduced loads in the 7,500 ft⋅lbf (10,200 J) range, in order to be more forgiving to shooters. The recoil of the full-power loads is very punishing and if the gun has a scope, scope cuts on the forehead are common. A factory powder charge for this cartridge is about 115 grains (7.5 g).

For many years the Weatherby Mark V rifles chambered in .460 Weatherby were equipped with Pendleton muzzle brakes to help alleviate the effects of recoil. The Pendleton muzzle brake is an integral braking system installed by porting the rifle barrel and once cut into the barrel cannot be reversed. All current Weatherby Mark V rifles chambered for the .378 Weatherby Magnum and its derivatives are provided with the Accubrake as a standard accessory with the rifle package. The Accubrake redfactory-loadedil by about 53%. Unlike the earlier Pendleton muzzle brake, the Accubrake is a removable, screw-on type brake. The use of muzzle brakes is frowned on by the hunting community in particularly in guided hunting situations involving dangerous game. Since the Accubrake is a removable accessory, it can be reserved for sighting in. According to Weatherby, the removal of the Accubrake will not change the point of impact.

== Handloading ==
460 Weatherby Magnum reloading components

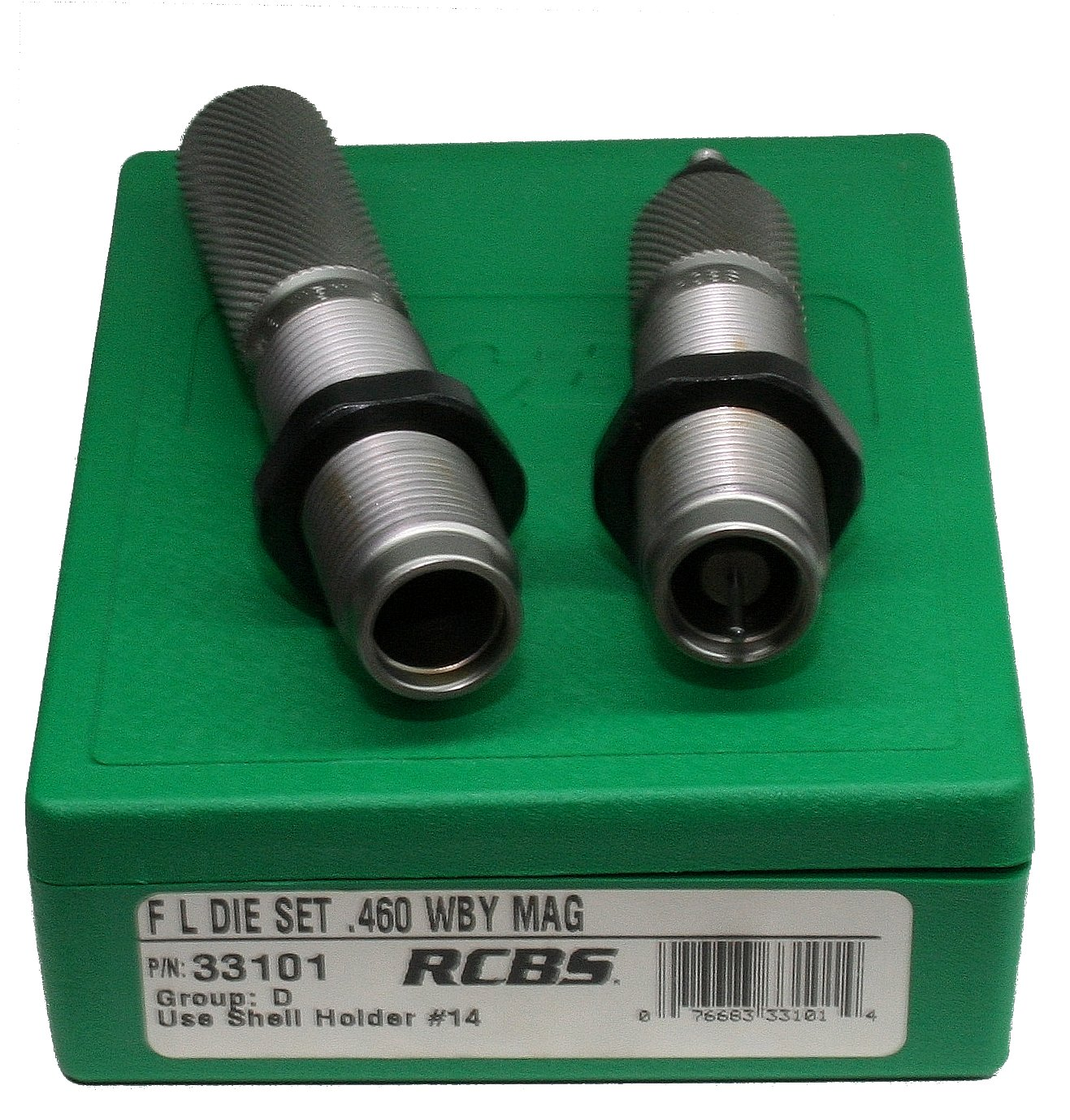

As factory loaded ammunition for the .460 Weatherby Magnum is optimized for heavy dangerous game, reloading components are often used for the .460 Weatherby Magnum. Reloading the .460 Weatherby Magnum is no more difficult than reloading any other belted magnum cartridges. The reloader has a wide variety of components, bullets and powders available.

Among bullet manufacturers Barnes, Hornady and Lyman provide reloading data in their manuals for the .460 Weatherby Magnum. Powder manufacturers Accurate Arms, Hodgdon and Norma have also provide reloading data for the cartridge.

=== Bullets ===
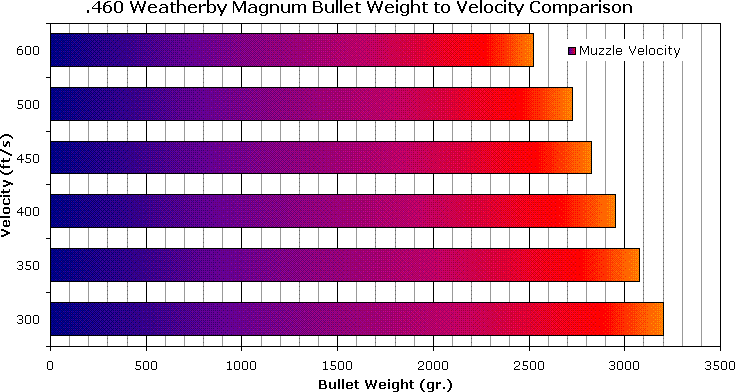

The .460 Weatherby Magnum accepts .458 in (11.6 mm) bullets. There are a large variety of bullets manufactured which are suited for the .460 Weatherby. Bullets weighing between 250–600 gr (16–39 g) are acceptable although the cartridge performs best with bullets weighing between 450–600 gr (29–39 g). The 250–400 gr (16–26 g) bullets are optimized for use with the .45-70 Government cartridge. Such bullets are used with reduced loads. All major bullet manufacturers produce bullets that can be used in the .460 Weatherby.

Table of bullets available for reloading the .460 Weatherby Magnum
Manufacturer	Bullet
A-Square	465 gr (30.1 g) and 500 gr (32 g) Triad (Monolithic, Dead Tough & Lion Load) bullets
Barnes	250 gr (16 g) TSX FN^{†}; 300 gr (19 g) TSX FN, TSX FB, SP & FNSP; 350 gr (23 g) TSX FB; 400 gr (26 g) SP & FNSP; 450 gr (29 g) TSX FB & solid; 500 gr (32 g) TSX FB and solid and 600 gr (39 g) original^{†}
Hornady	300 gr (19 g) HP; 350 gr (23 g) RN and FP; 480 gr (31 g) DGS & DGX; 500 gr (32 g) RN-IB^{†}, FMJ-RN^{†}, DGS & DGX
Nosler	300 gr (19 g) Partition; 500 gr (32 g) PP partition & solid
Speer	350 gr (23 g) SPFN^{†}; 400 gr (26 g) SPFN^{†}; 500 gr (32 g) AGS(SP)^{†}, AGS-T^{†}, TBBC^{†} & TBSS^{†}
Swift	400 gr (26 g) A Frame; 450 gr (29 g) A Frame; 500 gr (32 g) A Frame
Woodleigh	400 gr (26 g) PP-SN; 480 gr (31 g) RN-SN & FMJ; 500 gr (32 g) PP-SN, RN-SN & FMJ; 550 gr (36 g) RN-SN & FMJ
^{†} indicates discontinued bullet.

In addition bullets there are several hard cast .458 in (11.6 mm) diameter bullets that are compatible with the .460 Weatherby Magnum. Such bullets, unlike jacketed bullets, are designed to be driven at reduced velocities. Driving these bullets at .460 Weatherby velocities can cause lead to be deposited in the barrel. Regular cast bullets are not recommended with the .460 Weatherby as the upper end of the permissible velocities for these cast bullets is lower than the lowest velocities obtainable from the .460 Weatherby Magnum.

=== Powders ===
The .460 Weatherby performs at its best with medium slow burning powders especially with heavier bullets. Usual powder charges start in excess of 100 gr (6.5 g). Due to the large capacity case, charges less than 90% load density are not usually recommended. Hangfires with cartridges such as the .460 Weatherby are extremely unpleasant. Powder charges with higher load densities provide more reliable burn performance than lighter charges.

Powders' suitability for the .460 Weatherby Magnum
Powder brand	Lighter bullets - 250–400 gr (16–26 g)	Heavier bullets - 400–600 gr (26–39 g)
Accurate Arms	AA2520, AA2700 & AA4350	AA2700, AA4350 & AA3100
Alliant	RL-15 & RL-17	RL-17 & RL-19
Hodgdon	H380, H414, Varget, H4895 & H4350	H4350 & H4831
IMR	IMR 3031, IMR 4320, IMR 4064 & IMR 4350	IMR 4350 & IMR 4831
Norma	203-B & 204	204 & MRP
Vihtavuori	N-140 & N-150	N-150, N-160 & N-560
Winchester	WW760	WW760

For reduced velocity reloads powders such as Accurate Arms' AA8700 and Hodgdon's H870 have performed well. With AA8700 and H870 there remains a large quantity of un-burnt powder. Faster powders occupy less volume; so a filler such as Dacron is used to hold the powder charge against the primer to provide shot to shot consistence and reliable ignition.

=== Cases ===
At present there is one single manufacturer of .460 Weatherby Magnum brass: Norma Precision. Norma Precision manufactured brass is headstamped as Weatherby (as opposed to Norma) as they are under contract by Weatherby to manufacture Weatherby Ammunition. Weatherby brass is available from Weatherby.

=== Primers ===
When Roy Weatherby began working with the .378 Weatherby Magnum, the parent cartridge of the .460 Weatherby Magnum, he found the primers of the day to be unreliable. Roy Weatherby contacted Charles L. Horn, the founder of Federal Cartridge Company and explained his problem. Horn's reply was "We'll make you a primer that, by God, will set your powder ablaze". The Federal 215 primer was developed for the .378 Weatherby Magnum cartridge and is the only primer which is generally recommended for use with the .460 Weatherby Magnum cartridge. This primer was created specifically to provide reliable ignition for compressed powder charges in large capacity cases. All reloading manuals provide loading data using only this particular primer to develop reloading data for the .460 Weatherby Magnum.

In a pinch the Winchester WLRM primer or primers with similar brisance may be substituted. The Federal 216 primer is not available for sale to the reloader at present but should the primer become available it may be substituted for the Federal 215 primer. This primer was developed for the .470 Nitro Express and is currently used by Federal to load the cartridge.

=== Dies ===
Full length and neck sizing dies are available from RCBS and Redding. A full-length die set is available from Hornady Manufacturing. Most two-die set includes a bullet seating die and either a full-length resizing die or a neck sizing die. A full-length sizing die reforms the complete body of the case to specification. The neck sizing die reforms only the neck so that it can hold the bullet in place. Neck-sizing cases rather than full length sizing cases can extend the case life of cartridges. On the downside, cases that are only neck sized may not feed through some actions reliably especially when used in semi-automatic rifles. Cartridges which are intended for semi-automatics should be full length resized. Most Weatherby manufactured rifle chambers are machined to very tight tolerances making full length resizing has little effect on extending the case life as the cartridge brass does not have to be worked as much to reform it. If once fired cases are to be used in a rifle in other than one it which it had been previously fired full length resizing the cases is the norm.

== Parent cartridge ==
The large case capacity of the .460 Weatherby Magnum lends itself to various forms of conversion and experimentation. The .460 Weatherby Magnum has served as the immediate parent cartridge of several proprietary and wildcat cartridges. It is, however, also correct to list the .378 Weatherby Magnum as the parent cartridge for these cartridges as the .460 Weatherby Magnum itself was based on the .378 Weatherby Magnum case. The following are some of the better known cartridges based on the .460 Weatherby where the .460 acted as the direct parent cartridge:

.460 A-Square Short
The cartridge is a proprietary cartridge designed by Arthur Alphin of A-Square. This .458 caliber (11.6 mm) cartridge is based on a shortened .460 Weatherby Magnum case which can be used in a standard length action rifle. The cartridge is capable of developing 6,670 ft⋅lbf (9,040 J) when firing a 500-grain (32 g) bullet at 2,450 ft/s (750 m/s).

.465 H&H Magnum

The cartridge was designed by Russell Wilkins and Holland & Holland and released in 2003. The cartridge is capable of firing a .46 caliber (11.7 mm) 480 gr (31 g) bullet at 2,385 ft/s (727 m/s). This cartridge is designed to work at moderate pressures.

.475 A&M Magnum

The .475 A&M Magnum is a .47 caliber (12 mm) wildcat cartridge designed by the Atkinson & Marquart Rifle Company of Prescott AZ. It is based on the .378 Weatherby Magnum necked up to accept a .475 in (12.1 mm) diameter bullet.

.500 Whisper

The .500 Whisper was designed by J.D. Jones of SSK Industries. It is based on a shortened .460 Weatherby Magnum case which is then necked up to accept a .510 in (13.0 mm) VLD bullet. It is capable of firing a 750-grain (49 g) at 1,050 ft/s (320 m/s).

.50 Peacekeeper
This cartridge is another one of J.D. Jones' designs. It is essentially a .460 Weatherby Magnum necked up to accept a 750-grain (49 g), .510 in (13.0 mm) diameter VLD bullet which it is capable of firing at 2,205 ft/s (672 m/s) for 8,100 ft⋅lbf (11,000 J) energy.

.500 A-Square

The .500 A-Square is another proprietary cartridge designed by Arthur Alphin of A-Square based on the .460 Weatherby Magnum necked up to accept a .510 in (13.0 mm) diameter bullet. The .500 A-Square is capable of achieving 8,127 ft⋅lbf (11,019 J) energy with a 600-grain (39 g) bullet launched at 2,470 ft/s (750 m/s).

== See also ==
- Weatherby Magnum
- List of rifle cartridges
- Table of handgun and rifle cartridges
- 11 mm caliber
- .378 Weatherby Magnum
- .416 Weatherby Magnum
- .30-378 Weatherby Magnum
- .338-378 Weatherby Magnum
