= .375 Weatherby Magnum =

Rifle cartridge

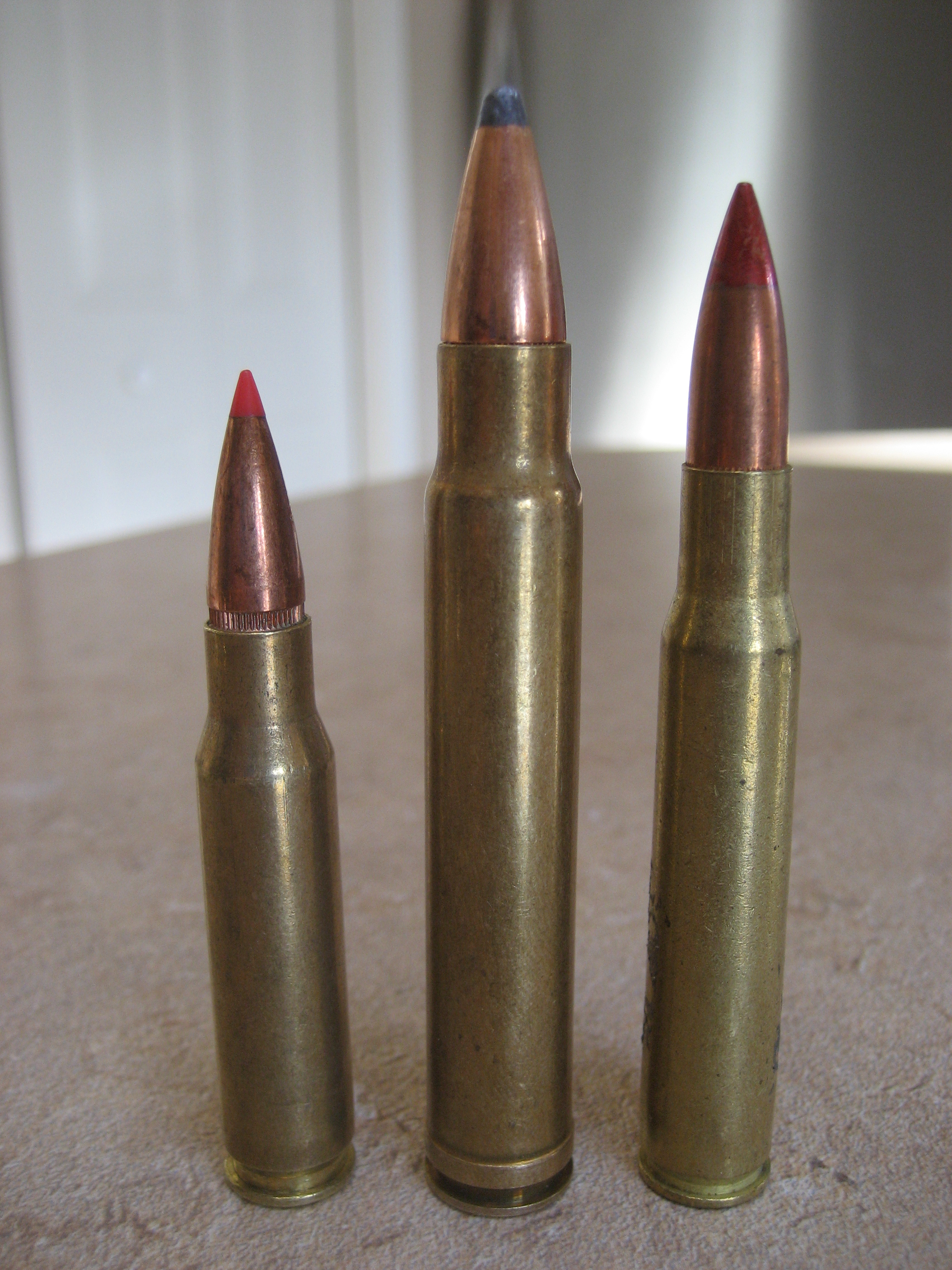
- .308 Win (left), .375 Weatherby Mag, .30-06 (right)
- Type: Rifle
- Place of origin: USA

Production history
- Designer: Roy Weatherby
- Designed: 1944
- Manufacturer: Weatherby
- Produced: 1945
- Variants: .375 H&H Magnum, .375 Ackley Improved

Specifications
- Parent case: .375 H&H Magnum
- Case type: Belted, bottleneck
- Bullet diameter: .375 in (9.5 mm)
- Land diameter: .368 in (9.3 mm)
- Neck diameter: .402 in (10.2 mm)
- Shoulder diameter: .492 in (12.5 mm)
- Base diameter: .512 in (13.0 mm)
- Rim diameter: .532 in (13.5 mm)
- Rim thickness: .051 in (1.3 mm)
- Case length: 2.860 in (72.6 mm)
- Overall length: 3.600 in (91.4 mm)
- Rifling twist: 1 in 12
- Primer type: Large rifle

Ballistic performance
Bullet mass/type	Velocity	Energy
270 gr (17 g)	2,940 ft/s (900 m/s)	5,181 ft⋅lbf (7,024 J)
300 gr (19 g)	2,800 ft/s (850 m/s)	5,223 ft⋅lbf (7,081 J)
235 gr (15 g)	3,135 ft/s (956 m/s)	5,125 ft⋅lbf (6,949 J)
- Test barrel length: 20 in Source(s): Barnes & Amber

The .375 Weatherby Magnum (9.5×73mmB) is a medium-bore rifle cartridge. The cartridge is blown out, improved and provided with the Weatherby double radius shoulder – given the Weatherby treatment – version of the .375 H&H Magnum. Unlike other improved versions of the .375 H&H Magnum like the .375 Ackley Improved, the .375 Weatherby Magnum is not a wildcat and existed as a proprietary cartridge until the CIP published specifications for the cartridge.

== History ==
The .375 Weatherby Magnum was designed by Roy Weatherby in South Gate, California, in 1944 and put into production in 1945. The original cases were fire formed from .300 H&H Magnum Winchester brass, then from Richard Speer's 300 Weatherby brass before finally settling with Norma as a source for cases. It was also with Norma that Weatherby finally found a source for loaded ammunition. Production of .375 Weatherby ammunition ceased in 1960 but was reintroduced in 2001 due to demand.

== Comments ==
The .375 Weatherby was designed as a dangerous game cartridge. The cartridge is able to fire a 300 gr (19 g) bullet at 2,800 ft/s (850 m/s) generating a muzzle energy of 5,224 ft⋅lbf (7,083 J) with the trajectory of the 30-06 Springfield. This performance level makes it an appropriate all-round African safari cartridge that is usable against plains game species as well. The .375 Weatherby is considered overly powerful for North American game.

== Design and specifications ==
The .375 Weatherby Magnum is an improved version of the .375 H&H Magnum. The parent case is based on the .300 H&H Magnum blown out and necked up to accept a .375 in (9.5 mm). The cartridge features the Weatherby double radius shoulder. The Weatherby Magnum is not considered a proprietary cartridge as the CIP has published specifications for the cartridge.

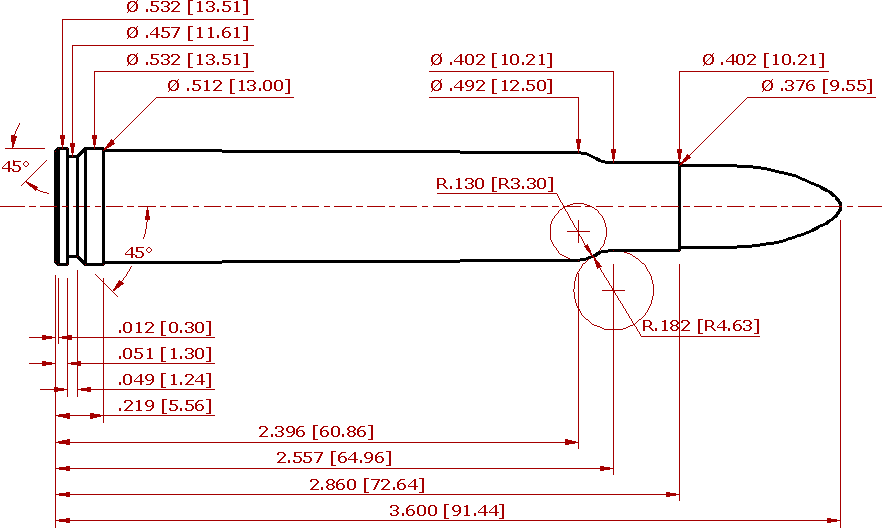

CIP recommends a 6 groove barrel with groove width of 3.25 mm (0.128 in), a bore Ø of 9.35 mm (0.368 in) and a groove Ø of 9.55 mm (0.376 in). The recommended twist rate is one revolution in 305 mm (12.0 in). Case capacity is 105 gr. of water (6.82 cm^{3}). The FreeBore/Leade for this Cartridge is 0.373 thou. as per the Factory Spec's.

== Performance ==
As an improved cartridge the .375 Weatherby Magnum provides a leap in performance over its parent cartridge. The velocity gain over the .375 H&H Magnum works out to be about 240 ft/s (73 m/s) and an increase in maximum point blank range of about 25 yd (23 m) with bullets of equal weight. The .375 Weatherby Magnum fires a 270 gr (17 g) at 2,940 ft/s (900 m/s) generating 5,181 ft⋅lbf (7,024 J) and a 300 gr (19 g) at 2,800 ft/s (850 m/s) which generates 5,224 ft⋅lbf (7,083 J). The cartridge generates more energy than factory loads for the .375 Remington Ultra Magnum, .416 Rigby or the .458 Winchester Magnum.

== See also ==
- List of cartridges by caliber
- List of rifle cartridges
- 9mm caliber

== Sources ==
- Barnes, Frank C., ed. by John T. Amber. Cartridges of the World. Northfield, IL: DBI Books, 1972.
- Hornady Handbook of Cartridge Reloading, 7th edition, 2007.
