= .416 Taylor =

Rifle cartridge

- Type: Centerfire/Rifle

Production history
- Designer: Robert Chatfield-Taylor
- Designed: 1972
- Manufacturer: A-Square

Specifications
- Parent case: .458 Winchester Magnum
- Case type: Belted, bottleneck
- Bullet diameter: .416 in (10.6 mm)
- Neck diameter: .447 in (11.4 mm)
- Shoulder diameter: .491 in (12.5 mm)
- Base diameter: .512 in (13.0 mm)
- Rim diameter: .532 in (13.5 mm)
- Rim thickness: .050 in (1.3 mm)
- Case length: 2.5 in (64 mm)
- Overall length: 3.34 in (85 mm)
- Rifling twist: 1 in 14 in (360 mm)
- Primer type: Magnum Rifle

The .416 Taylor is a rifle cartridge. According to Ken Waters in Pet Loads, it was created by Robert Chatfield-Taylor in the early 1970s, with the first rifle in this caliber being a factory barreled Winchester Model 70. The case is based on the .458 Winchester Magnum necked down to accept .416 caliber bullets.

== Usage ==
The .416 Taylor uses a .416 in (10.6 mm) bullet diameter. With maximum loads, the cartridge is capable of propelling a 400-grain (26 g) bullet at an average of 2,350 ft/s (720 m/s) from a 24 in (61 cm) barrel yielding a muzzle energy of 4,903 ft⋅lbf (6,648 J). The work on this caliber (performed by Waters) was done with an experimental factory Ruger Model 77. He reported that an absolute maximum load of certain listed powders would push a 400-grain (26 g) bullet to 2,400 ft/s (730 m/s), thereby equaling (and perhaps exceeding) the performance of the .416 Rigby (presuming moderate temperatures and barometric pressures). Waters also reported that 400-grain (26 g) bullets could exceed 2,600 ft/s (790 m/s) when propelled by certain listed powders. Under normal hunting conditions, the Taylor cartridge is therefore capable of taking any of the largest and most dangerous game animals in the world.

Gunsmiths are re-barreling Browning BAR .338 Winchester Magnum rifles with .416 Taylor barrels thereby creating semi-automatic hunting rifles in a dangerous game caliber.

== Origin ==
The cartridge was created to replace the magnum length .416 Rigby which at that time was nearly obsolete, with a cartridge that would fit into a standard length bolt-action rifle. The shorter action rifles are not only easier to carry in heavy cover, but also make it more convenient to carry more ammunition. The advantages to cartridges in .416 inch bullet diameter are that they generally present the shooter with less recoil and flatter trajectory than the larger .458 caliber dangerous game rifles (like the .458 Winchester Magnum). They also have more striking power and penetration than medium bores like the .375 H&H Magnum. The 416 Taylor is a SAAMI standardized cartridge, and was offered as a standard production item by A-Square until it closed in 2011. It is currently loaded by Norma of Sweden.

== See also ==
- List of rifle cartridges
- 10 mm caliber
