= .30-378 Weatherby Magnum =

Rifle cartridge

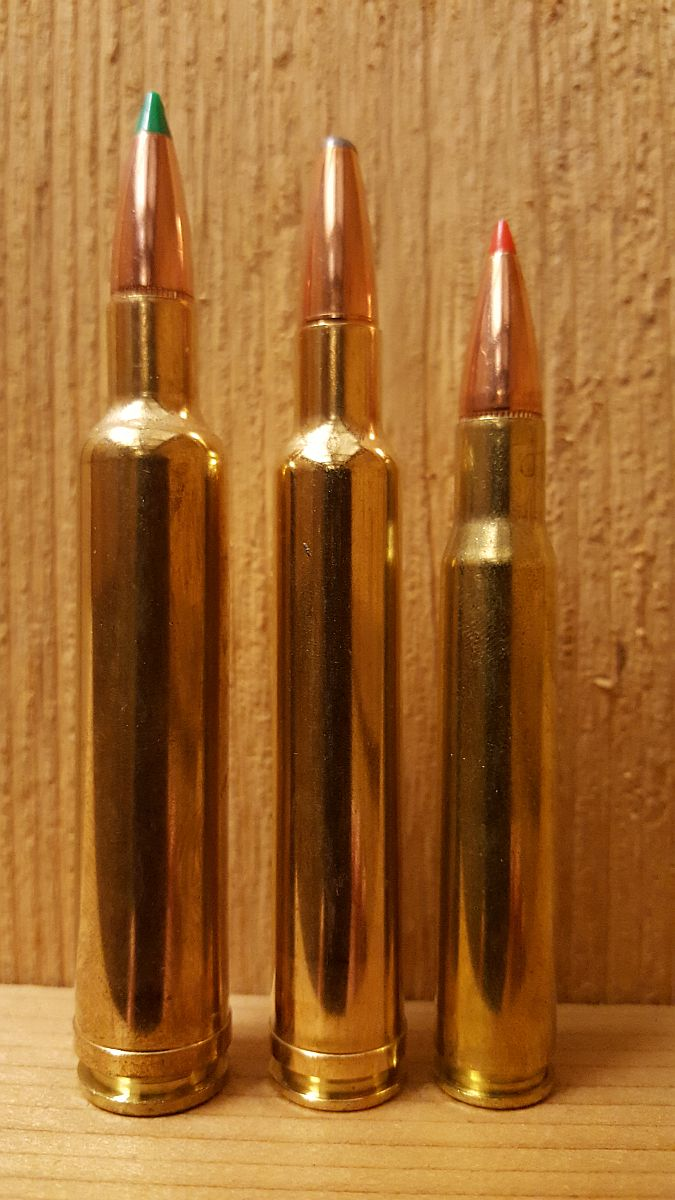
- Left, with .300 Weatherby Magnum (center) and .30-06
- Type: Rifle
- Place of origin: USA

Production history
- Designer: Roy Weatherby
- Designed: 1959
- Manufacturer: Weatherby Inc.
- Produced: 1996 - Current
- Variants: .30-.378 Magnum, .30/378 Arch, .30/378 Weatherby

Specifications
- Parent case: .378 Weatherby Magnum
- Case type: belted magnum
- Bullet diameter: .308 in (7.8 mm)
- Neck diameter: .337 in (8.6 mm)
- Shoulder diameter: .561 in (14.2 mm)
- Base diameter: .582 in (14.8 mm)
- Rim diameter: .579 in (14.7 mm)
- Case length: 2.913 in (74.0 mm)
- Overall length: 3.690 in (93.7 mm)
- Case capacity: 133 gr H_{2}O (8.6 cm^{3})
- Rifling twist: 1 in 10 in (250 mm)
- Primer type: Large rifle magnum
- Maximum pressure: 63,817 psi (440.00 MPa)

Ballistic performance
| Bullet mass/type | Velocity | Energy |
|---|---|---|
| 165 gr (11 g) BST | 3,500 ft/s (1,100 m/s) | 4,488 ft⋅lbf (6,085 J) |
| 180 gr (12 g) BST | 3,420 ft/s (1,040 m/s) | 4,676 ft⋅lbf (6,340 J) |
| 200 gr (13 g) Partition | 3,160 ft/s (960 m/s) | 4,434 ft⋅lbf (6,012 J) |
- Test barrel length: 26" (660 mm); Source: Weatherby

The .30-378 Weatherby Magnum is a .30 caliber, belted, bottle-necked rifle cartridge. The cartridge was developed in response to a US Army military contract in 1959. While still unreleased to the public, the cartridge went on to set world records for accuracy including the first ten 10X in 1,000 yards (910 m) benchrest shooting.

== Cartridge origin ==
The .30-378 was originally designed by Roy Weatherby as an anti-personnel/anti-materiel military cartridge for a government contract. The cartridge was created by necking down the .378 Weatherby Magnum to accept a .308 in (7.8 mm) diameter bullet. The United States Army's Redstone Arsenal requested a rifle cartridge that could develop 6,000 ft/s (1,800 m/s) for the effects of light bullets against armor. The .30-378 Weatherby Magnum was able to attain over 5,000 ft/s (1,500 m/s). Using a slower burning and denser propellant, the .30-378 Weatherby Magnum surpassed the US Army's requirement of 6,000 ft/s (1,800 m/s).

However, the shooting public had to wait until 1996 for Weatherby to release the cartridge. In the meantime, the .30-378 Weatherby Magnum had gone on to set world records in 1,000 yards (910 m) benchrest competitions. Earl Chronister, shooting a .30-378 Weatherby Magnum shot the first ever ten shot 10X with the first nine shot to 3.125 inches and the tenth flyer for an overall group of 4.375 inches. This record stood for over 30 years. Several variations of the .30-378 Weatherby Magnum were created by custom ammunition manufacturers, known as wildcatters. Hammond rifles and H-S Precision were among the several custom gun manufacturers who chambered and built rifles long before Weatherby got around to releasing the rifle to the public.

In 1991 Shooting Times editor Layne Simpson met with Ed Weatherby, the son of Weatherby Inc. founder Roy Weatherby, and urged him to release the .30-378 Weatherby to the public as a standard chambering in the Mark V action. In 1995 Layne Simpson built a rifle chambered for the .30-378 Weatherby and developed loading data and passed the data on to Norma Precision to provide a basis for their factory loaded ammunition.

== Design and specification ==
The .30-378 Weatherby Magnum utilizes the .378 Weatherby Magnum as a parent cartridge. The .378 Weatherby case was necked down to accept a .30 caliber (7.62 mm) bullet while preserving the double radii shoulder of the parent case. The resulting case held a greater volume than any previous commercial cartridge.

When the cartridge was created by Roy Weatherby in 1959 there were no commercial propellants that suited the cartridge. Even the standard slow burning powder of the time IMR4350 which was used in the Weatherby line of cartridges was too fast to take advantage of the case capacity of the .30-378 Weatherby cartridge. The result was that performance advantage that was created by the volume of the .30-378 Weatherby was minimal over the competing .300 Weatherby Magnum cartridge, which had been introduced 25 years earlier. However, when launching 30 gr (1.9 g) bullets which are extremely light for caliber as the Redstone Arsenal contract specified, required the use of relatively faster propellants. However, the hunting public and target shooters used 150 gr and heavier bullets, which require slower burning powders due to the extreme overbore nature of the cartridge.

SAAMI compliant .30-378 Weatherby Magnum cartridge schematic: All dimensions in inches [millimeters].

SAAMI recommends a 6 groove barrel with a twist rate of 10 in (250 mm). The recommended bore diameter is .3005 in (7.63 mm) and groove diameter is .3080 in (7.82 mm) with each groove having an arc width of .118 in (3.0 mm).

== Performance ==
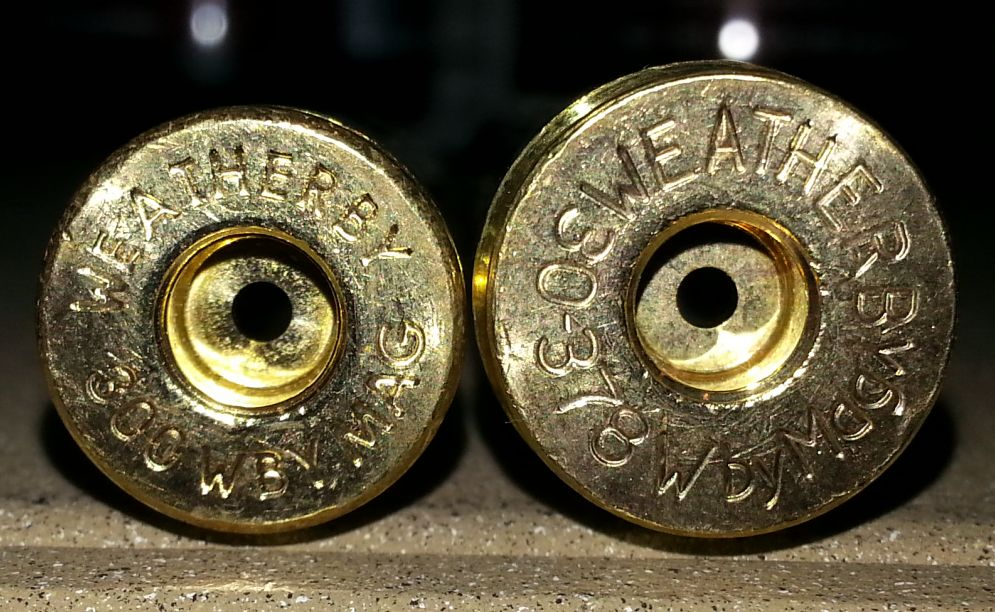
The .30-378 has a much larger body diameter than the .300 Weatherby Magnum.

The .30-378 Weatherby Magnum is considered one of the most accurate rifle cartridges. The cartridge held the world record for accuracy at 1,000 yards (910 m) for over thirty years. Given factory ammunition, Weatherby guarantees 1.5 MOA accuracy from their Weatherby Mark V action rifles and sub-MOA (.99 MOA or better) accuracy from their Range Certified line of rifles and Vanguard rifle lines. Careful handloading — checking for bullet jacket concentricity, weighing of brass and bullets, uniformity of case length and overall cartridge length, choice of components, seating of bullet can all increase the accuracy of the cartridge.

The .30-378 Weatherby Magnum is a long range cartridge. It is the most powerful - in terms of energy - .30 caliber production cartridge available. It is also the flattest-shooting .30 caliber factory ammunition available. Dependent on the ammunition chosen the cartridge has a maximum point blank range of over 400 yd (370 m). The cartridge retains enough energy for deer-sized game at distances over 1,000 yd (910 m), and has enough retained energy for elk and moose-sized game at a distance of over 700 yd (640 m).

== Sporting usage ==
The .30-378 Weatherby was designed to be a high performance hunting cartridge. When released to the public, it is intended for the hunting of all the big game species of North America, Asia and Africa, save dangerous game. Since this is a small bore caliber, hunting with the .30-378 Weatherby Magnum may commonly be limited to game less than 2,000 lb (910 kg).

Soon after the .30-378 Weatherby was designed it was adopted by the benchrest shooting community. It became popular among the 1,000 yards (910 m) shooting communities such as the Original 1,000 Yards Club of Pennsylvania and went on to shoot world records at that distance.

The Thompson Long Range shooting school uses the .30-378 Weatherby due to its high accuracy and reliable performance.

== See also ==
- List of rifle cartridges
- Table of handgun and rifle cartridges
- 7 mm caliber
