= .338-378 Weatherby Magnum =

Cartridge

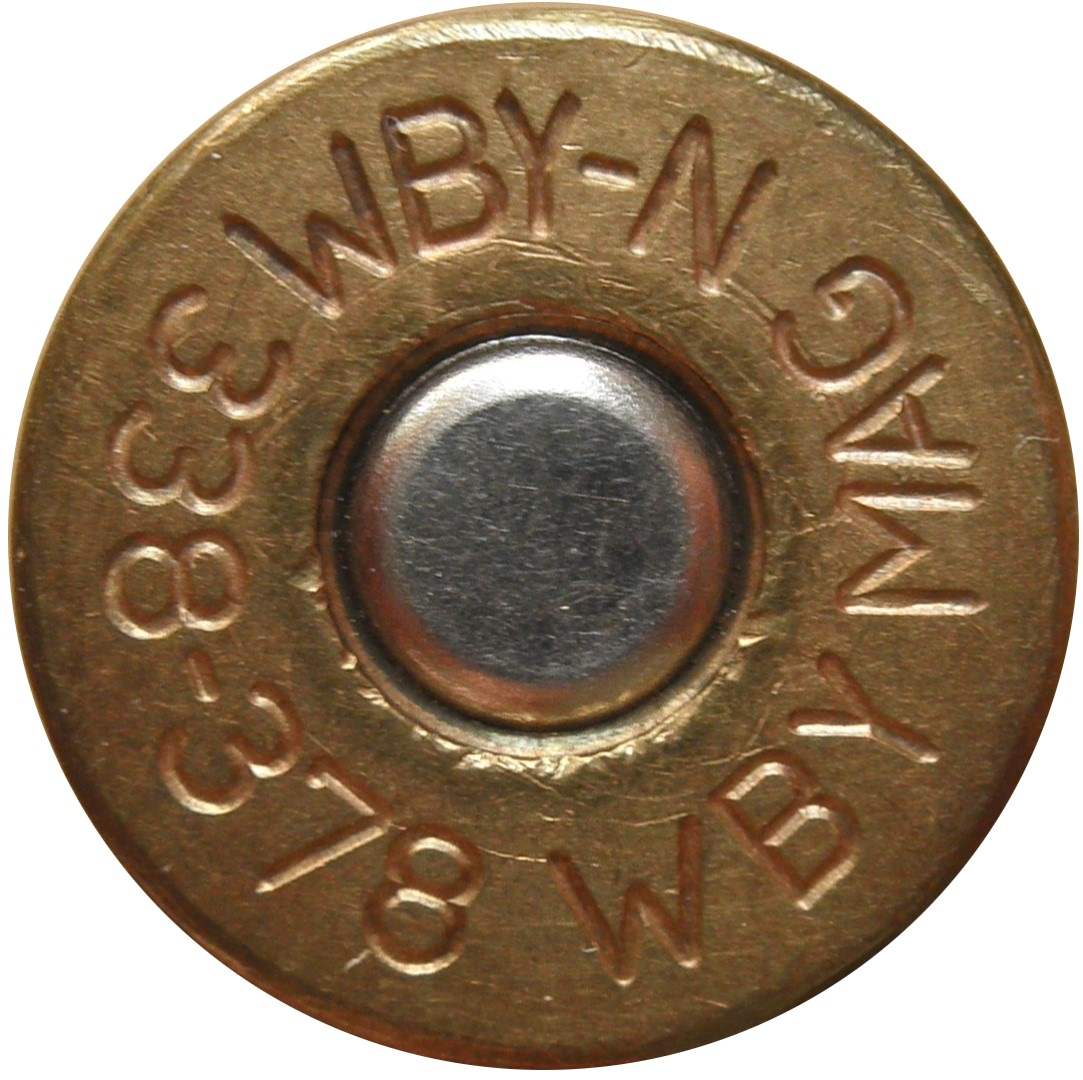
- 338-378 Weatherby
- Type: Centerfire/Rifle
- Place of origin: United States

Production history
- Designer: Elmer Keith and Bob Thomson
- Designed: 1963
- Manufacturer: Weatherby
- Produced: 1998

Specifications
- Parent case: .378 Weatherby Magnum
- Case type: Belted, bottleneck
- Bullet diameter: .338 in (8.6 mm)
- Neck diameter: .361 in (9.2 mm)
- Shoulder diameter: .560 in (14.2 mm)
- Base diameter: .582 in (14.8 mm)
- Rim diameter: .579 in (14.7 mm)
- Rim thickness: .059 in (1.5 mm)
- Case length: 2.905 in (73.8 mm)
- Overall length: 3.65 in (93 mm)
- Case capacity: 125 gr H_{2}O (8.1 cm^{3})
- Rifling twist: 1 in 10
- Primer type: Magnum Rifle
- Maximum pressure: 63,817 psi (440.00 MPa)

Ballistic performance
| Bullet mass/type | Velocity | Energy |
|---|---|---|
| 250 gr (16 g) Partition type | 3,060 ft/s (930 m/s) | 5,197 ft⋅lbf (7,046 J) |
| 225 gr (15 g) Truncated solid | 3,180 ft/s (970 m/s) | 5,052 ft⋅lbf (6,850 J) |
| 200 gr (13 g) Boat-tail soft point | 3,350 ft/s (1,020 m/s) | 4,983 ft⋅lbf (6,756 J) |
- Test barrel length: 28 in (71 cm); Source(s): Weatherby

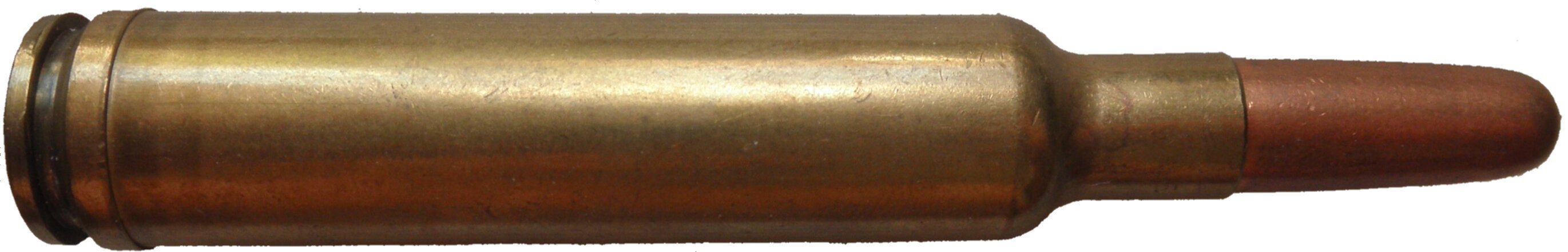

The .338-378 Weatherby Magnum is based on the .338-378 KT, a wildcat cartridge created by Elmer Keith and R.W. "Bob" Thomson in 1966. The KT is based on the .378 Weatherby Magnum cartridge but is shorter by 1/4" and necked down to a .338 caliber bullet. This design was chosen for elk hunting, using the powders available at the time, such as Hodgdon H-4831. Due to the continued popularity of the KT, Weatherby introduced the .338-378 Weatherby Magnum in 1998 to its line of commercial ammunition, using a full-length 2.908" case. Although based on the .338-378 KT, the .338-378 Weatherby Magnum and the KT have different load data and chamber sizes and are not interchangeable.

== See also ==
- List of rifle cartridges
- 8 mm caliber
