= .500 A-Square =

Rifle cartridge

- Type: Centerfire/Rifle
- Place of origin: United States

Production history
- Designer: Arthur Alphin
- Designed: 1976
- Manufacturer: A-Square Company LLC
- Produced: 1978–2011

Specifications
- Parent case: .460 Weatherby Magnum
- Case type: Belted, bottleneck
- Bullet diameter: .510 in (13.0 mm)
- Neck diameter: .536 in (13.6 mm)
- Shoulder diameter: .568 in (14.4 mm)
- Base diameter: .582 in (14.8 mm)
- Rim diameter: .579 in (14.7 mm)
- Rim thickness: .063 in (1.6 mm)
- Case length: 2.900 in (73.7 mm)
- Overall length: 3.74 in (95 mm)
- Case capacity: 141.45 gr H_{2}O (9.166 cm^{3})
- Rifling twist: 1 in 10"
- Primer type: Large rifle magnum
- Maximum pressure: 63,860 psi (440.3 MPa)

Ballistic performance
Bullet mass/type	Velocity	Energy
600 gr (39 g) Monolithic Solid	2,470 ft/s (750 m/s)	8,127 ft⋅lbf (11,019 J)
600 gr (39 g) Round Nose	2,470 ft/s (750 m/s)	8,127 ft⋅lbf (11,019 J)
- Test barrel length: 26 in (660 mm); Source

The .500 A-Square is a belted, bottleneck rifle cartridge, developed by Arthur Alphin in 1976. The cartridge is based on the .460 Weatherby Magnum necked up to accept the .510 in (12.95 mm) bullet, the same as the .50 BMG cartridge. This was Col. Alphin's first commercial sporting cartridge and was designed in "response to some severe problems experienced with the .458 Winchester Magnum on safari in Mozambique."

The .500 A-Square was a proprietary cartridge and the world's most powerful commercially available sporting cartridge. However, the .50 BMG is the world's most powerful commercial cartridge for any shooting purpose. The .500 A-Square is used specifically for the hunting of elephants and Cape buffalo as well being used as a backup gun for professional hunters and guides while hunting thick skin dangerous game in Africa.

== Overview ==
The .500 A-Square cartridge was commercially available from both A-Square and Midway USA as loaded ammunition. The ammunition was available in three loads:

- 600-grain (38.88 g) monolithic solid
- 600-grain (38.88 g) soft-nose thick jacket
- 600-grain (38.88 g) soft-nose thin jacket

All bullet/cartridge combinations were advertised with a muzzle velocity of 2,470 ft/s (750 m/s) and muzzle energy of 8,127 ft⋅lbf (11,019 J).

In comparison, the parent cartridge, the .460 Weatherby Magnum commercially loaded as a 500 grains (32.4 g) monolithic solid has a muzzle velocity of 2,580 ft/s (790 m/s) and a muzzle energy of 7,389 ft⋅lbf (10,018 J). .50 BMG commercially loaded 661 grains (42.8 g) FMJ M33 ball ammunition has a muzzle velocity of 2,750 ft/s (840 m/s) and muzzle energy of 11,102 ft⋅lbf (15,052 J).

Although there is limited hand-loading information, bullet weights (hunting) are from between 300 grains (19.4 g) to 647 grains (41.9 g).

=== A-Square Company ===
In October 2011, A-Square ceased all ammunition operations.
