= Roy Weatherby =

American businessman and inventor (1910–1988)

Roy E. Weatherby
- Born: September 4, 1910; Kansas, US
- Died: April 4, 1988 (aged 77); Newport Beach, California, US
- Occupations: Inventor, businessman

Roy Edward Weatherby (4 September 1910 – 4 April 1988) was an American businessman and inventor who was the founder and owner of Weatherby, Inc., a rifle, shotgun and cartridge manufacturing company founded in 1945. He created an entire line of custom cartridges, and was one of the people responsible for the industry interest in high-speed cartridges. He created a custom rifle action to accommodate his high-pressure cartridges.

== History ==
Weatherby grew up on a farm in Kansas. He later moved to Huntington Park, California where he and his wife, Camilla, bought a Spanish style home located on 7672 California Street on the corner of Grand Avenue. Weatherby started manufacturing Weatherby Guns in his garage at the Huntington Park home.

Weatherby firearms are best known for their very high-powered rifle cartridges, all bearing the name Weatherby Magnum such as the .257 Weatherby Magnum (designed in 1944), the .378 Weatherby Magnum (1953) and the .460 Weatherby Magnum (1957), and for the production of appropriately-chambered sporting rifles.

Weatherby came into the world of commercial cartridge and rifle making with a background of experimentation in cartridge wildcatting and was determined to develop a range of sporting rifle cartridges that would produce very high muzzle velocities, high bullet energies, very flat trajectories, and very hard-hitting characteristics at long range. Among those who influenced his thinking and products was the English riflemaker and cartridge designer David Lloyd.

Following Weatherby's death, the Weatherby Foundation International (initially known as the Roy E. Weatherby Foundation) was established as a non-profit, tax-exempt Foundation to promote sporting hunting and contributing to wildlife conservation. It currently leads an initiative to foster the development of educational outdoor expositions, and as at 2007 has sponsored 78 events in 19 of the US states, with combined attendance of nearly 1 million. The Foundation annually sponsors the Weatherby Hunting and Conservation Award.

== See also ==
- Charles Newton (inventor), an earlier designer of high-velocity rifle cartridges
