= Blaser R93 =

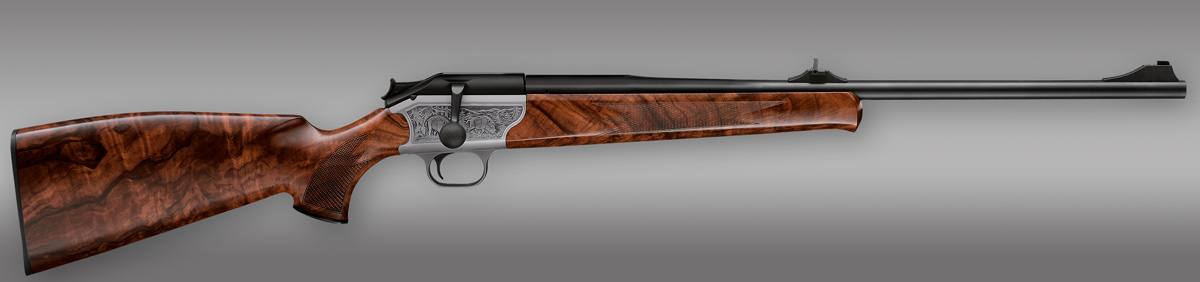
- Type: Precision rifle
- Place of origin: Germany

Production history
- Designer: Meinhard Zeh
- Designed: 1993
- Manufacturer: Blaser
- Produced: 1993–2017
- No. built: 200,000^{+}
- Variants: Blaser 93 Tactical

Specifications
- Caliber: Various; see
- Action: Radial locking straight-pull bolt-action
- Feed system: 3- or 4- round internal box magazine
- Sights: Aperture-type iron sights or telescopic sight

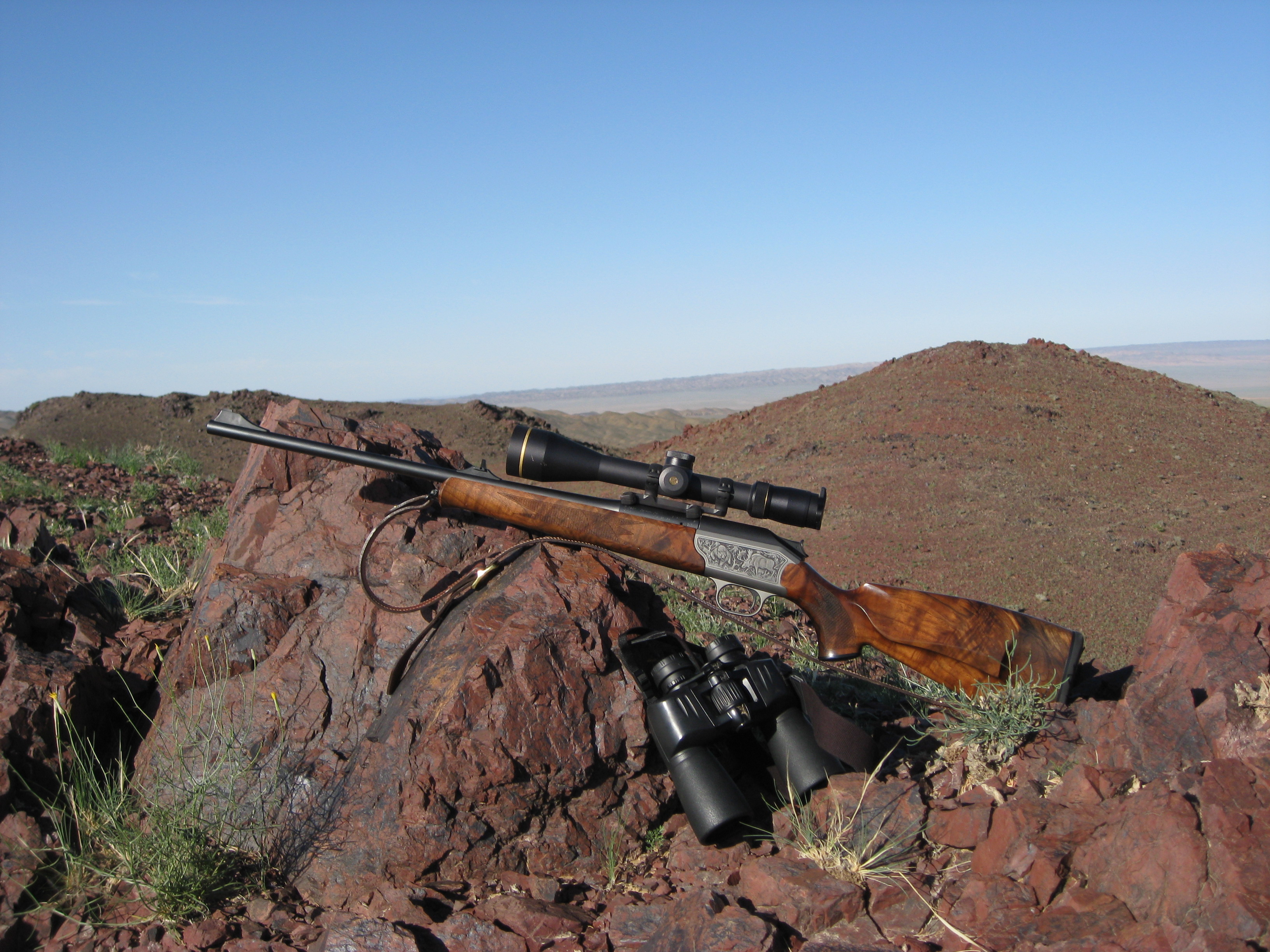
Blaser R93 and binoculars

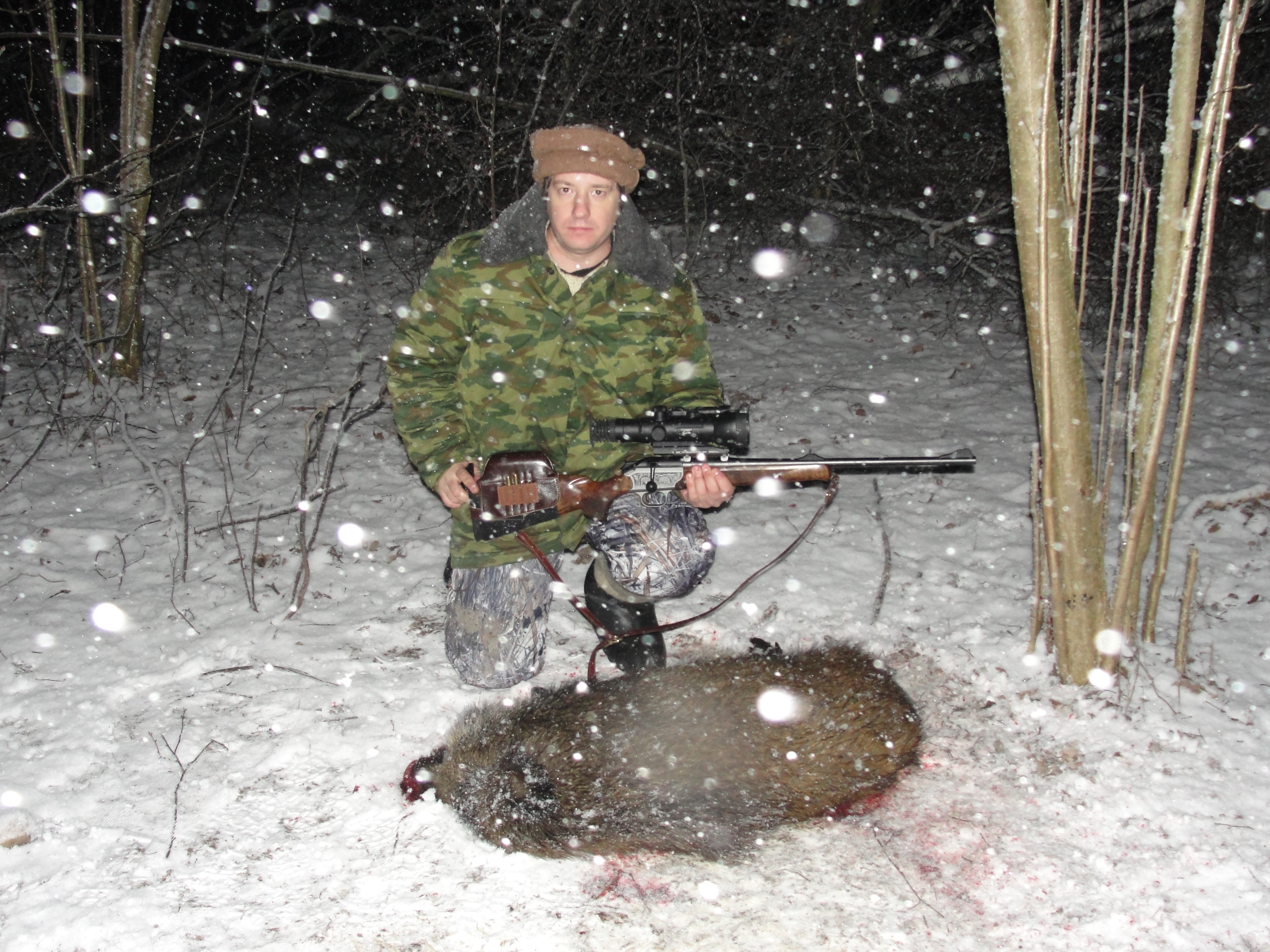
Blaser R93 on a wild boar hunt trophy photo

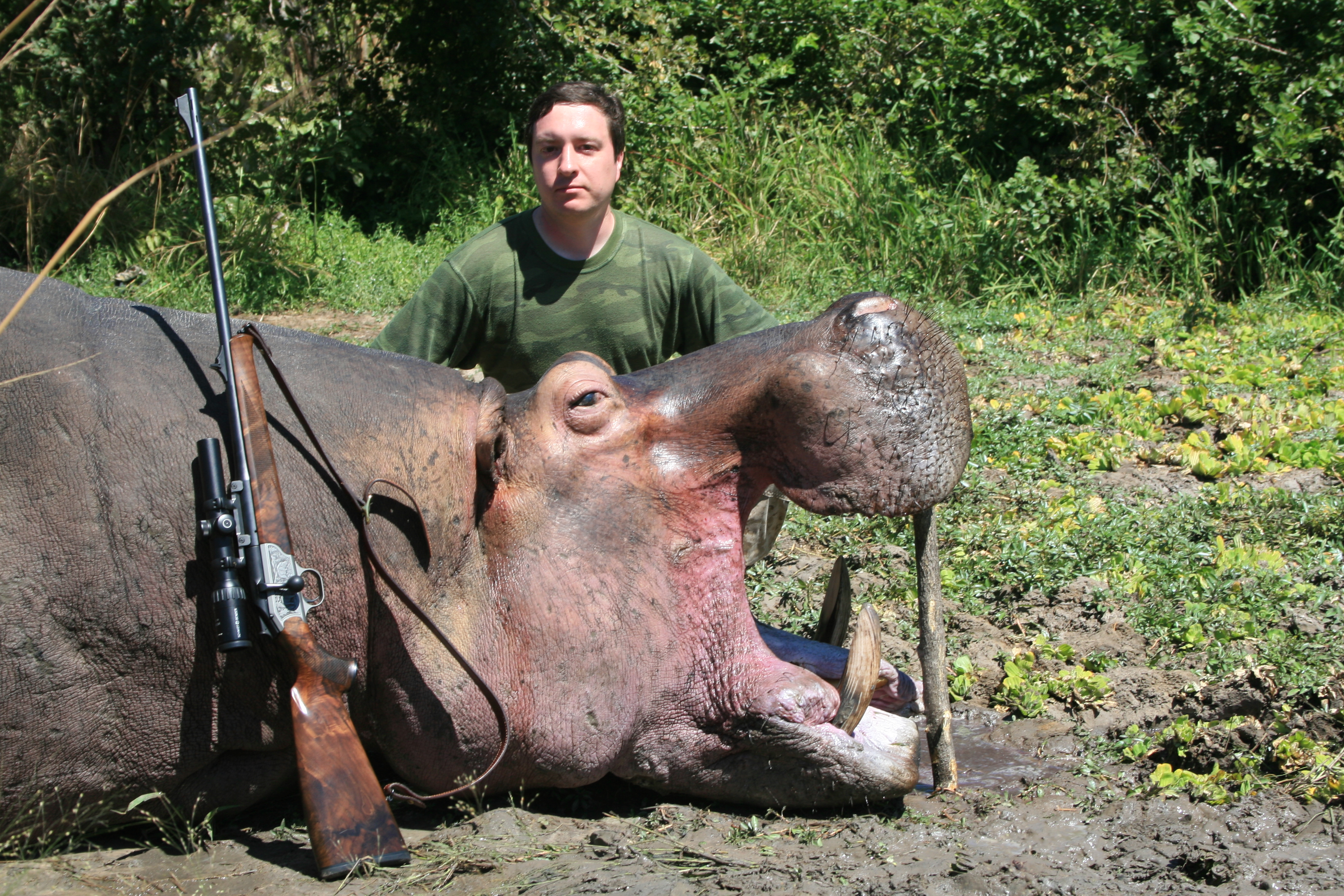
Blaser R93 on a Hippopotamus hunt trophy photo

The Blaser R93 is a straight-pull action precision rifle offered in a multitude of calibers and barrel lengths manufactured by the German firearms manufacturer Blaser. Designed by Blasers' designer Mr. Meinhard Zeh in 1993, it had a number of features rare on modern hunting rifles, including a manual cocking system and a proprietary Blaser saddle scope mount for mounting the optic directly to the quick-change barrel.

In 2002, more than 100,000 complete Blaser R93 rifles had been produced. By 2017, more than 200,000 R93 rifles had been produced, but it is not clear whether the R93 Tactical variant is included in these numbers.

== History ==
The predecessor of the R93 was the 60 degree turn bolt action Blaser R84, which was discontinued after the introduction of the R93 in 1993.

The successor of the R93, the Blaser R8, was introduced in 2008. Production of the R93 ended by 2017, though Blaser continued to offer spare parts as stock allowed.

== Design features ==
=== Modularity ===
The Blaser R93 is a modular weapon system built around an aluminum alloy frame. Offering stocks and barrels of varying length and thickness, the rifle is available in chamberings from .22 LR to .375 H&H Magnum/.416 Remington Magnum/.458 Winchester Magnum as well as 28 gauge shot/slug when equipped with a shotgun barrel.

The barrel has a quick-change design which lets the user switch barrels using two screws and a hex key. Different bolt heads for different groups of calibers and magazine inserts are also user changeable, making the Blaser R93 a modular firearm capable of using a multitude of calibers in its chassis. A R93 Rimfire conversion kit was also available in .22 Long Rifle and .17 HMR consisting of a new magazine, barrel, bolt head and bolt catch insert.

The rifle has a shorter overall length compare to more traditional designs due to the trigger being placed under the magazine. The rifle also has a reputation for being easy to disassemble and reassemble which can be an advantage when doing maintenance or during travelling, and has a reputation for having a repeatable zero upon reassembly.

=== Scope mounts ===
The Blaser is unique because the scope mounts on the barrel instead of the receiver. A Scope/barrel assembly can be removed and replaced with no change in zero. In 2009, Blaser and Carl Zeiss AG began offering a scope that switches on a red dot when the R93/R8 are cocked ("Zeiss Illumination Control/iC"). The iC system is based on the Zeiss rail.

=== Trigger ===
To avoid accidents with set triggers, Blaser offers the R93 only with a direct trigger, also known as single-stage triggers. The manual cocking system, or "de-cocking safety", enables the shooter to securely carry the weapon, only cocking the rifle just before the shot.

Per US importer armusa.com, http://armusa.com/SigarmsRifles6.htm

"Also contributing to the Blaser's performance are its patented sear-free trigger mechanism and completely free-floated barrel." A free-floated barrel is a common modern accurizing technique, but searless triggers are quite novel.

=== Bolt design ===
The R93 straight-pull bolt action locks by a 14-lug radial collet in a 360 degrees groove in the barrel and is designed to withstand pressures significantly exceeding the Mauser 98–type bolt-action rifles. The Blaser R93 displays a locking surface of 66 mm^{2} (0.102 in^{2}) compared to 56 mm^{2} (0.087 in^{2}) for the Mauser 98. The bolt is symmetric and self-centering, providing a basis for increased accuracy. The stressed parts are made out of hammer forged steel and plasma nitrided to provide corrosion resistance and mechanical strength. In addition to the primary lockup by the bolt head into the barrel, the R93 also features a secondary lockup for added safety. While secondary lockup on turn bolt rifles is achieved with the bolt handle, secondary lockup on the R93 this is achieved with a camplate which supports the locked action against a hardened steelplate in the rear part of the magazine-box. The bolt knob uses M6 threads, enabling the use of aftermarket bolt knobs.

=== Available chamberings ===
Below is a list of some of the available factory chamberings for the R93. Several different barrel profiles were also available, such as Standard, Octagonal, Semi Weight, "Stutzen", Match or Safari Letters in parentheses corresponding stamping on the bolt head.

Hornet (HO)

- .22 Hornet

Mini (MI) caliber group

- .204 Ruger
- .222 Rem
- .223 Rem

Standard (ST) caliber group

- 22-250
- 243 Win
- 5.6×57mm
- 6 mm Norma BR
- 6mm Rem
- 6×62mm Frères
- .25-06 Rem
- 6.5×55mm
- 6.5×57
- 6.5×65 RWS
- .270 Win
- 7×57
- 7×64mm
- .308 Win
- .30-06 Springfield
- 8×57mm
- 9.3×62mm
- .45 Blaser

Medium (ME) caliber group

- 6.5×68mm
- 7.5×55mm
- 8×68mm S
- 9.3×64mm Brenneke

Magnum (MA) caliber group

- .257 Weatherby Magnum
- .264 Winchester Magnum
- .270 Winchester Short Magnum
- 7 mm Rem Mag
- .300 Win Mag
- .300 Weatherby Magnum
- .300 WSM
- .338 Win Mag
- .375 H&H Magnum
- .416 Rem Mag
- .458 Lott

Ultra Magnum (UM) caliber group

- 7 mm STW
- .300 Rem Ultra Mag

Jeffery (JE) caliber group

- .500 Jeffery

Swiss (CH) caliber group

- 10.3×60R Swiss (single shot)

Shot (28) caliber group

- Caliber 28 (13.97 mm; 0.550 in) shotgun/slug barrel.

=== Successors ===
The R93 was upgraded to the Blaser R8 introduced in 2008, which has a detachable box magazine/trigger combination. Production of complete R93 rifles ceased in 2016. The Blaser R8 displays an enlarged locking surface of 96 mm^{2} (0.149 in^{2}) compared to 66 mm^{2} (0.102 in^{2}) of the R93. While the R93 collet has a locking angle of about 50 degrees, the angle of the R8 has been steepened to almost 90 degrees. Further the radial collet opens differently. This results in a less smooth operating bolt of the R8 when compared to the R93 series and some weight increase. Other differences are that the R8 is a little heavier and is offered in a wider range of chamberings. Parts for the R93 in general do not fit the R8 series rifles, except for scope mounts.

== Recalls ==
In 2000, a recall was announced on R93 rifles delivered with plastic bolt carriers. According to Blaser, only 0.4% of all R93 rifles had been delivered with plastic bolt carriers, and only on the R93 Offroad model. Due to the increased risk of accidents, Blaser offered to replace all such plastic bolt carriers with a regular aluminum bolt carrier for free.

In May 2003, Blaser issued a recall on all R93 rifles sold in the United States, except the UIT, CISM, and LRS/LRS2 models, because non-stainless steel pins inadvertently had been used in some trigger units. Owners were urged to have their rifles inspected by Blaser's US representative to see if their trigger unit was affected, and if so be changed from a non-stainless to a stainless one.

== Incidents ==
In 1994, after a shooting accident near Koblenz in Germany, the R93 was criticised with claims that it could not withstand high pressures, and that the bolt would unlock when excessive pressures were generated.

In August 2003, 41-year-old Norwegian Jan Sørlie had an accident where his R93 chambered for 8×68mm S exploded, resulting in loss of an eye and a skull fracture requiring titanium replacement. Sørlie reported that had used handloaded ammunition loaded with 5.05 g (77.9 gr) Norma MRP powder and a 12.7 g (196 gr) projectile.

In January 2004, 38-year-old German Albrecht Huf had an accident near Koblenz in Germany where his R93 chambered in .300 Weatherby Magnum exploded. Huf sustained injury to his thumb, jaw and zygomatic bone. He claimed to have used Weatherby factory ammunition only. An investigation by the German DEVA institute concluded that handloaded .300 Weatherby Magnum ammunition had been used that greatly exceeded the maximum safe gas pressure for the round.

In July 2009, Spaniard Jesus Nieto had an accident near Madrid in Spain where his R93 rifle chambered for 7mm Remington Magnum exploded, causing the bolt carrier to hit and damage his maxilar bone. The accident was determined by the shooter to be due to faulty ammunition leaving a fired bullet stuck in the barrel, causing an explosion on the subsequent shot. The shooter stated that he had used Remington Safari Grade commercial ammunition.

In July 2014, 69-year-old Christer Svensson experienced an accident where his R93 chambered for .30-06 Springfield exploded while loading his rifle on a shooting range near Bollnäs in Sweden, resulting in the bolt hitting his face. Svensson was using Norma factory ammunition. He turned in the rifle to Blaser, but wanted the Swedish National Forensic Centre to investigate the matter. However, he later agreed to the wish of Blaser and its Swedish distributors that all technical investigation would be performed by the German DEVA institute. The DEVA report concluded that the damages to the firearm almost certainly came from a combination of an overpressure and a problem with the casing of the cartridge. Svensson told the Swedish hunting and firearms magazine Svensk Jakt that he had difficulties getting his firearm back from the testing, and that it had been modified when he finally received it. He stated that the chamber and bolt head had been chopped off, and that the barrel did not have a stamped serial number anymore, and claimed the serial number appeared to have been reapplied by hand. He also claimed his rifle originally had a front sight mounted to it which was missing on the returned barrel.

In August 2014, Svensk Jakt wrote that another Swede, Tony Kristoffersson, had experienced an explosion with his R93 while on a Beaver hunt the same year. He described that his rifle had made a clicking sound as if it had failed to fire, but exploded when he tried to pull the bolt back, which resulted in the bolt hitting his hand. The Swedish Blaser distributor later stated that while it is possible to pull the trigger without the bolt being fully locked into battery, the firing pin is designed such that it will not hit the primer with sufficient force to ignite the cartridge.

== See also ==
- Heym SR 30
- Lynx 94
- Rößler Titan 16
- Ross rifle
