= Blaser R8 =

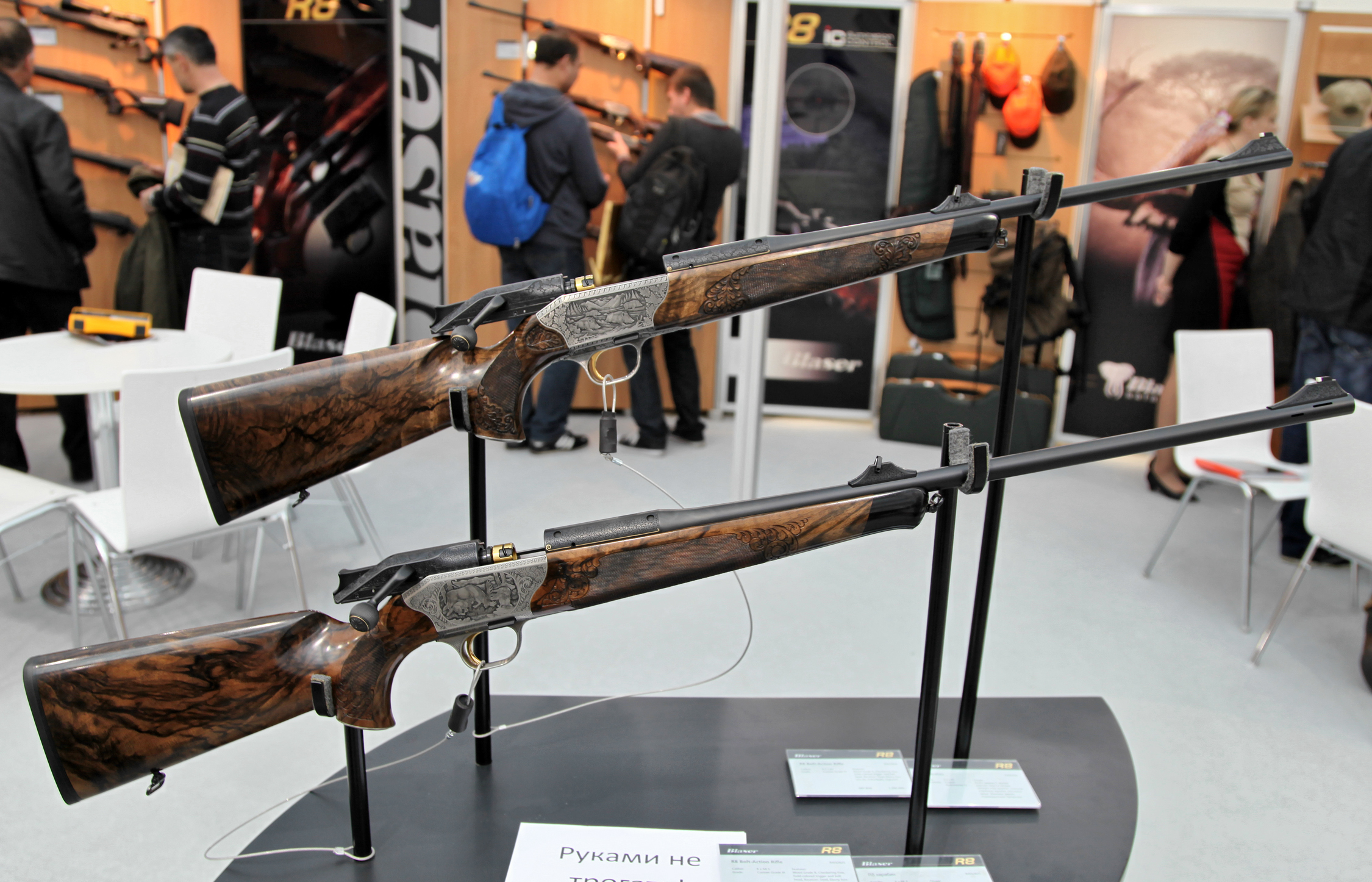
- Blaser R8 custom grade rifles. The front rifle features an optional ported barrel (integrated muzzle brake).
- Type: Straight-pull rifle
- Place of origin: Germany

Production history
- Manufacturer: Blaser Jagdwaffen GmbH
- Produced: 2008–present
- No. built: 300,000^{+}

Specifications
- Mass: 2.88 kg (6.35 lb)
- Length: 102.2 cm (40.25 in)
- Barrel length: 65.4 cm (25.75 in)
- Cartridge: .204 Ruger through .500 Jeffery available
- Action: Radial locking straight-pull bolt-action
- Feed system: 5- to 2-round detachable box magazine + trigger unit
- Sights: iron sights or telescopic sight

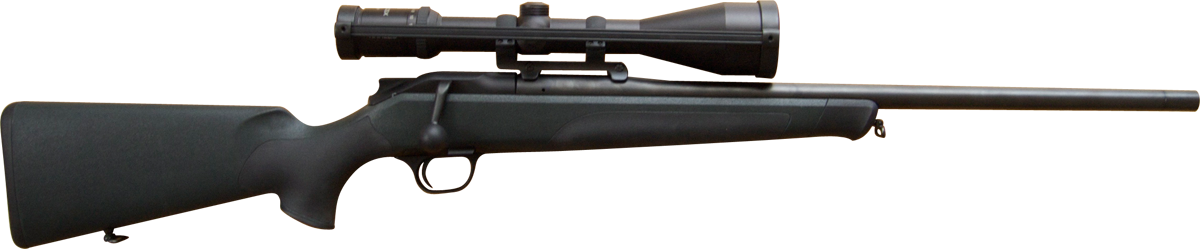
Blaser R8 Professional featuring a synthetic stock

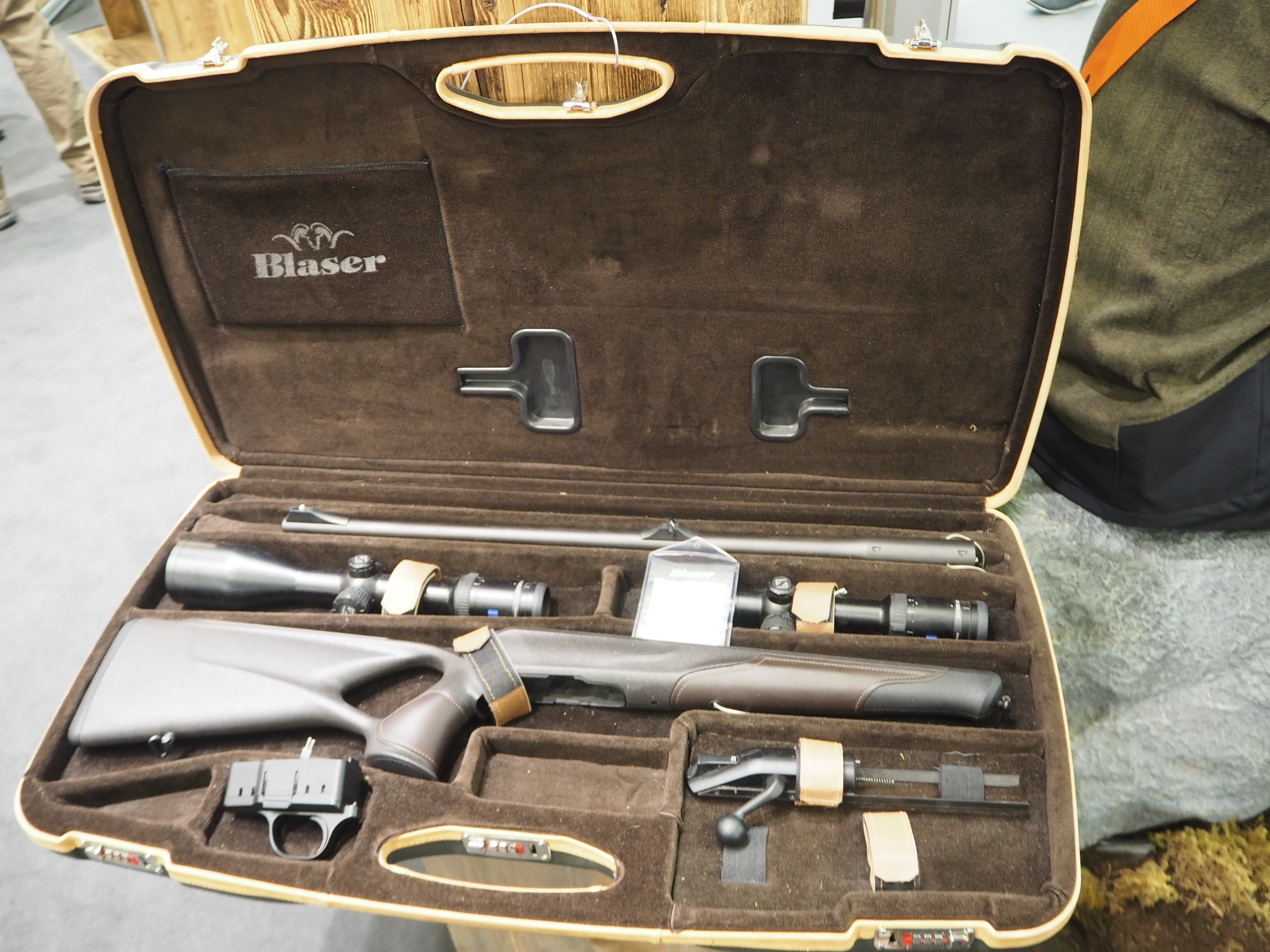
Blaser R8 Professional Success featuring a synthetic thumb-hole stock with non-slip inlays taken down in its traveling case

The Blaser R8 is a German straight-pull rifle known for its radially locking bolt system, modularity and its barrel mounted scope mount manufactured by Blaser. The rifle also features a manual cocking system and a direct trigger. In 2015 there had been more than 100,000 complete Blaser R8 rifles produced.

It is based on the Blaser R93 rifle series that was discontinued in 2016.

== Design features ==
=== Modularity ===
The Blaser R8 is a modular firearm built around an aluminium alloy receiver frame, offering differing stocks and barrels of varying length and thickness. Optionally a steel receiver frame can be ordered that increases the weight by approximately 550 grams (1.21 lb). The R8 is available in calibers from .204 Ruger to .500 Jeffery. Different bolt heads for different groups of calibers are user changeable and the barrel has a quick-change design which lets the user switch barrels using two screws and a hex key. For affordable training a .22 Long Rifle conversion kit is also available. The .22 LR kit consists of a new barrel, bolt head and magazine insert.

Aiming optics like telescopic sights mount on the barrel via a proprietary Blaser mounting mechanism instead of the receiver. A sight/barrel assembly can therefore be removed and replaced with no change in zero. There are also aftermarket adapters to other mounting standards available, such as picatinny. In 2019, Blaser and Carl Zeiss AG began offering a telescopic sight that switches on a red dot when a R93/R8 series rifle is cocked ("Zeiss Illumination Control/iC"). The iC system is based on the Zeiss rail.

=== Bolt design ===
The Blaser R8 straight-pull bolt action locks by a 14-lug radial collet in a 360 degrees groove in the barrel and is designed to withstand pressures significantly exceeding the Mauser 98–type bolt-action rifles. The bolt is symmetric and self-centering, providing a basis for increased accuracy. The Blaser R8 displays a locking surface of 96 mm^{2} (0.149 in^{2}) compared to 66 mm^{2} (0.102 in^{2}) for the Blaser R93 and 56 mm^{2} (0.087 in^{2}) for the Mauser M98 bolt action system. The stressed parts are made out of hammer forged steel and plasma nitrided to provide corrosion resistance and mechanical strength. In addition the primary lockup by the bolt head into the barrel, the R8 also features two secondary lockups for added safety, which is one more than the R93. Compared to the preceding R93 rifle series for additional safety the barrel has been thickened at the critical part, the groove has been enlarged and the locking angle of the collets has been steepened from about 50 to almost 90 degrees. Further the radial collet opens differently. The thus improved lockup of the R8 series comes at the price of a less smooth operating bolt when compared to the R93 series and some weight increase. The R8 lock up was successfully tested at the DEVA institute laboratory at 1,450.0 MPa (210,300 psi; 14,500 bar) piëzo pressure. Contrary to some other straight pull designs, the Blaser R93 and R8 have been reported to have no issues with primary extraction. The bolt head moves in a purely linear motion, and except for the bolt handle cam when opening or closing the action, operation by the shooter is also purely linear. The bolt knob uses M6 threads, enabling the use of aftermarket bolt knobs.

=== Magazine ===
The Blaser R8 has an uncommon detachable box magazine/trigger unit. When detached it renders the rifle inoperable and safe. To avoid accidents with set triggers, Blaser offers the R8 only with a direct trigger. The compact detachable box magazine/trigger unit contributes to balancing the rifle, as the Blaser straight pull action is about 50 to 60 mm shorter than conventional bolt actions.

The Blaser R8 Professional S 'budget' variant lacked the detachable box magazine/trigger unit of the more expensive R8 variants. Since the Blaser R8 Professional S model most R8 variants became available without the detachable box magazine/trigger unit.

=== Compatibility ===
Parts for the preceding Blaser R93 series in general do not fit the Blaser R8 series rifles, except for scope mounts.

=== Available chamberings ===
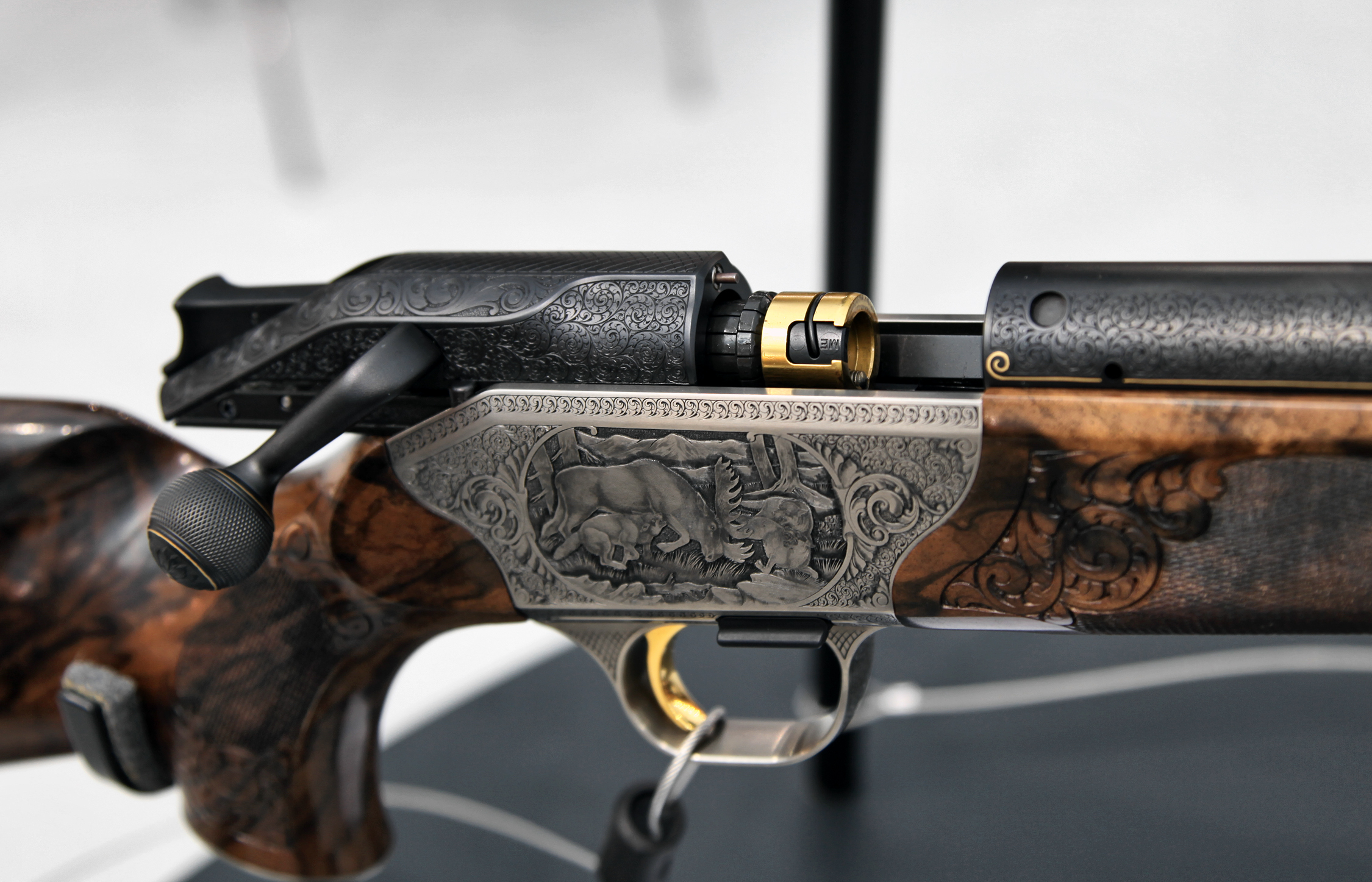
An 8×68mm S Blaser R8 Custom Grade II (ME caliber group).

Below is a list of some of the available factory chamberings for the R8:

Mini (MI) caliber group

- .204 Ruger
- .222 Rem
- .223 Rem

Standard (ST) caliber group

- 22-250
- 243 Win
- 6XC
- 6mm BR
- 6.5×47mm Lapua
- 6.5mm Creedmoor
- 6.5×55mm
- 6.5×57
- 6.5×65 RWS
- 6.5-284
- .270 Win
- 7×57
- 7×64mm
- .308 Winchester
- .30-06 Springfield
- 8×57mm
- 9.3×57
- 9.3×62mm
- 8,5x55 Blaser

Medium (ME) caliber group

- 6.5×68mm
- 7.5×55mm
- 8×68mm S

Magnum (MA) caliber group

- .257 Weatherby Magnum
- .270 Weatherby Magnum
- .270 Winchester Short Magnum
- 7 mm Blaser Magnum
- 7 mm Rem Mag
- .300 Blaser Magnum
- .300 Remington Ultra Mag
- .300 Win Mag
- .300 Weatherby Magnum
- .300 WSM
- .338 Win Mag
- .375 Blaser Magnum
- .375 H&H Magnum
- .416 Rem Mag
- .458 Win Mag
- .458 Lott

Jeffery (JE) caliber group

- .500 Jeffery

Swiss (CH) caliber group

- 10.3×60R Swiss (single shot)

Lapua Mag/Norma Mag (LA) caliber group

- .300 Norma Magnum
- .338 Lapua Magnum

== See also ==
- Heym SR 30
- Lynx 94
- Mauser M1996 / Rößler Titan 16
