= 8mm Remington Magnum =

Rifle cartridge

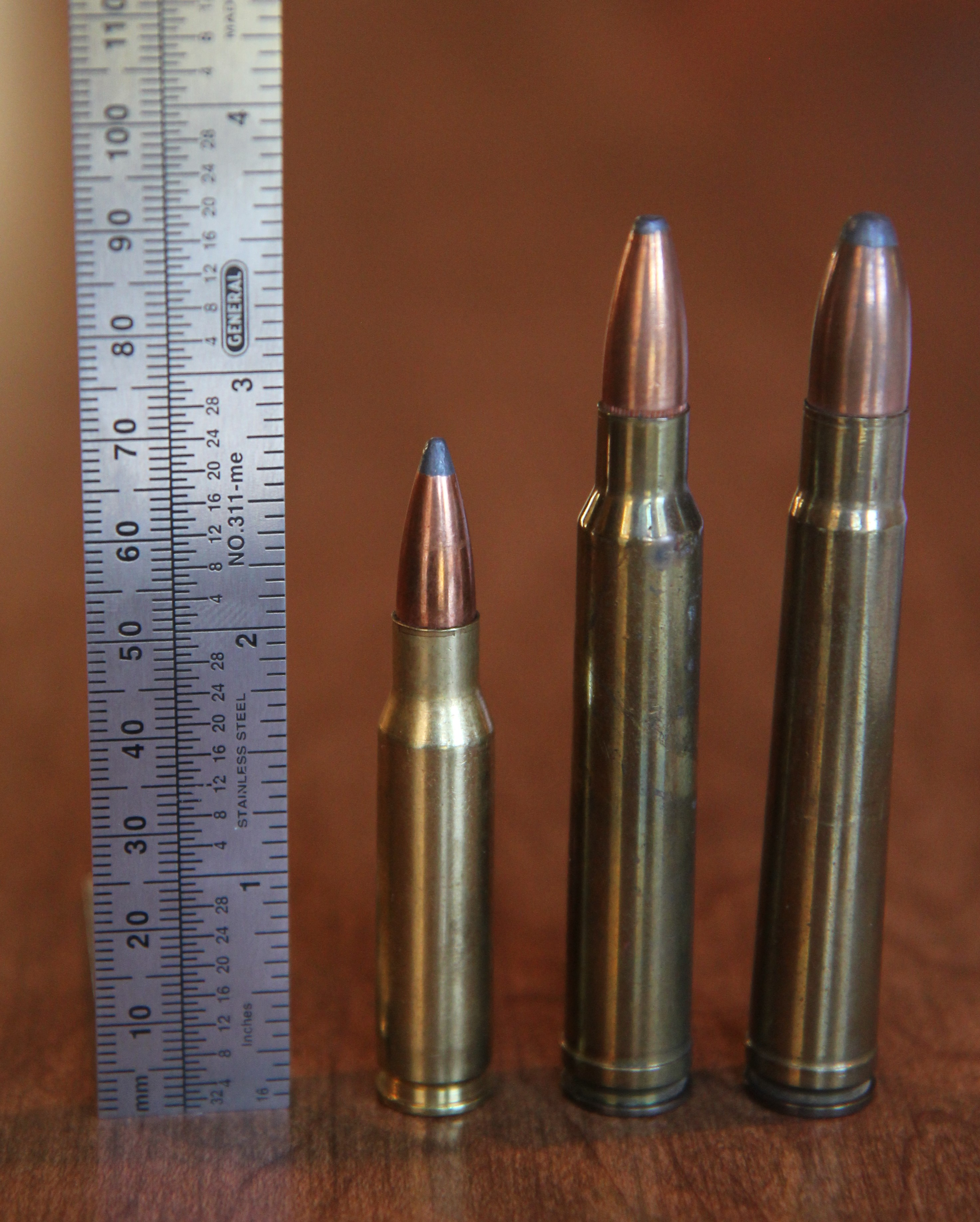
- 8mm Remington Magnum (center) with .308 Winchester (left) and .375 H&H Magnum (right)
- Type: Rifle
- Place of origin: United States

Service history
- In service: Never issued

Production history
- Designer: Remington Arms Company
- Designed: 1978
- Manufacturer: Remington
- Produced: 1978–present

Specifications
- Parent case: .375 H&H Magnum
- Case type: Belted, bottleneck
- Bullet diameter: .323 in (8.2 mm)
- Neck diameter: .355 in (9.0 mm)
- Shoulder diameter: .487 in (12.4 mm)
- Base diameter: .513 in (13.0 mm)
- Rim diameter: .532 in (13.5 mm)
- Rim thickness: .050 in (1.3 mm)
- Case length: 2.850 in (72.4 mm)
- Overall length: 3.600 in (91.4 mm)
- Case capacity: 99.0 gr H_{2}O (6.42 cm^{3})
- Rifling twist: 1 in 10 (1 in 254 mm)
- Primer type: Large Rifle
- Maximum pressure (C.I.P.): 63,817 psi (440.00 MPa)
- Maximum pressure (SAAMI): 65,000.0 psi (448.159 MPa)

Ballistic performance
Bullet mass/type	Velocity	Energy
200 gr (13 g) Partition type	2,900 ft/s (880 m/s)	3,734 ft⋅lbf (5,063 J)
200 gr (13 g) Bonded	3,050 ft/s (930 m/s)	4,132 ft⋅lbf (5,602 J)
180 gr (12 g) Protected point	3,210 ft/s (980 m/s)	4,119 ft⋅lbf (5,585 J)
180 gr (12 g) Polymer tipped	3,315 ft/s (1,010 m/s)	4,394 ft⋅lbf (5,957 J)
220 gr (14 g) Soft Point	2,965 ft/s (904 m/s)	4,296 ft⋅lbf (5,825 J)
- Test barrel length: 22 in (56 cm) 24 in (61 cm) and 26 in (66 cm); Source: Remington / Nosler /Sierra

The 8mm Remington Magnum belted rifle cartridge was introduced by Remington Arms Company in 1978 as a new chambering for the model 700 BDL rifle. The 8mm Remington Magnum's parent case is the .375 H&H Magnum. It is a very long and powerful cartridge that cannot be used in standard length actions, such as those that accommodate the .30-06 Springfield.

== Background ==
The 8mm Remington Magnum was intended to compete with the .300 Weatherby Magnum and .338 Winchester Magnum. Remington's decision to use a metric bullet may have been prompted by their past success with the 7 mm bore diameter.

Even though the 8mm Remington Magnum has never been very popular, it is a suitable cartridge for the hunting of elk, moose, caribou, and larger African antelope. The .338 Winchester Magnum had a 30-year head start on the market, and is short enough for medium length actions, which increases the models of rifles it could be produced in. It is also available with heavier bullets, although this isn't a problem for people that load their own rounds of this caliber. Bullet selection is quite critical with the 8mm Remington Magnum since the bullets have to be designed and constructed to hold together at magnum velocities.

== Cartridge dimensions ==
The 8mm Remington Magnum has 6.43 ml (99 grain) H_{2}O cartridge case capacity.

8mm Remington Magnum maximum C.I.P. cartridge dimensions. All sizes in millimetres (mm).

Americans would define the shoulder angle at alpha/2 = 25 degrees. The common rifling twist rate for this cartridge is 254 mm (1 in 10 in), 6 grooves, Ø lands = 8.00 mm, Ø grooves = 8.20 mm, land width = 3.10 mm and the primer type is large rifle magnum.

According to the official C.I.P. (Commission Internationale Permanente pour l'Epreuve des Armes à Feu Portatives) guidelines the 8mm Remington Magnum case can handle up to 440.00 MPa (63,817 psi) piezo pressure. In C.I.P. regulated countries every rifle cartridge combo has to be proofed at 125% of this maximum C.I.P. pressure to certify for sale to consumers.

This means that 8mm Remington Magnum chambered arms in C.I.P. regulated countries are currently (2014) proof tested at 550.00 MPa (79,771 psi) PE piezo pressure.

The SAAMI Maximum Average Pressure (MAP) for this cartridge is 65,000 psi (448.16 MPa) piezo pressure.

The German 8×68mm S cartridge introduced in 1939 is probably the closest ballistic twin of the 8mm Remington Magnum. The 8×68mm S is however a rebated rim cartridge.

== 8mm cartridges compared ==
Maximum muzzle velocity comparison in % of the probably most proliferated European and American 8 mm rifle cartridges out of 650 mm-long (25.59 in) barrels loaded with relatively light to heavy 8 mm bullets to their C.I.P. or SAAMI (Sporting Arms and Ammunition Manufacturers' Institute) sanctioned maximum pressures.

Bullet weight gram (grain)	8.23 g (127 gr)	9.72 g (150 gr)	11.34 g (175 gr)	12.96 g (200 gr)	14.26 g (220 gr)	Case capacity (%)
7.92×57mm Mauser (8×57mm IS)	100.0	100.0	100.0	100.0	100.0	100.0
8×64mm S	102.7	102.7	102.8	102.9	102.9	110.3
.325 WSM	108.7	109.1	109.0	109.3	111.1	131.7
8×68mm S	108.4	108.5	108.7	110.5	112.3	136.5
8mm Rem. Mag.	111.9	112.3	114.5	115.3	116.0	157.1

This comparison is not totally objective since the 8mm Remington Magnum and .325 WSM operate at 448.16 MPa (65,000 psi), the 8×68mm S at 440 MPa (63,817 psi), the 8×64mm S at 405 MPa (58,740 psi) and the 7.92×57mm Mauser at 390 MPa (56,564 psi) maximum chamber pressure. Higher chamber pressure results in higher muzzle velocities.

== The 8mm Remington Magnum as parent case ==
=== 7mm STW (Shooting Times Westerner) ===
The 8mm Remington Magnum case has functioned as the parent case for the 7mm STW, which is essentially a 7 mm (.284 caliber) necked-down version of the 8mm Remington Magnum. Designed by Layne Simpson, Editor of Shooting Times magazine, the wildcat status of the 7mm STW ended in 1996 when it got SAAMI certified and became an officially registered and sanctioned member of the 8mm Remington Magnum "family" of magnum rifle cartridges. With top handloads pushing a 150-grain bullet at nearly 3,400 feet per second, it is one of the fastest mid-bore rifle cartridges extant and is noted for its extremely flat trajectory. It is outclassed only by the Lazzeroni 7.21 Firebird and Remington's 7mm RUM

=== .416 Remington Magnum ===
The 8mm Remington Magnum case also has functioned as the parent case for the .416 Remington Magnum, which is a .416" caliber necked up version of the 8mm Remington Magnum. Unlike the 7 mm STW, the .416 Remington Magnum never had a wildcat status. It was designed by Remington and released directly to the public in 1988.

=== Wildcats ===
Cartridges that are not officially registered with nor sanctioned by C.I.P. (Commission Internationale Permanente pour l'Epreuve des Armes à Feu Portatives) or its American equivalent, SAAMI (Sporting Arms and Ammunition Manufacturers’ Institute) are generally known as wildcats. By blowing out standard factory cases the wildcatter generally hopes to gain extra muzzle velocity by increasing the case capacity of the factory parent cartridge case by a few percent. Practically there can be some muzzle velocity gained by this method, but the measured results between parent cartridges and their 'improved' wildcat offspring are often marginal. Besides changing the shape and internal volume of the parent cartridge case, wildcatters also can change the original caliber. A reason to change the original caliber can be to comply with a minimal permitted caliber or bullet weight for the legal hunting of certain species of game.

Wildcats are not governed by C.I.P. or SAAMI rules so wildcatters can capitalize the achievable high operating pressures. The 8mm Remington Magnum offers a sturdy pressure resistant cartridge case that can relatively easily be reloaded with primers, powder and bullets and hence be reused several times. With the 8mm Remington Magnum as the parent case wildcatters have created 6.35 mm (0.257 in) (.257 STW), 6.5 mm (0.264 in) (6.5 mm STW), .30 caliber (.30–8mm Remington Magnum, .300 Jarrett), 8 mm caliber (8 mm Jarrett), .338 caliber (.338 Jarrett), 0.358 in caliber (.358 STA) and 9.53 mm (0.375 in) (.375 JRS John R. Sundra) variants.

==== .358 STA (Shooting Times Alaskan) ====
Another brainchild of Layne Simpson, the .358 STA is an 8mm Remington Magnum case necked up to accept .358 caliber bullets with the shoulder angle changed from 25 degrees to 35 degrees and body taper removed to maximize powder capacity. It is able to propel a 300-grain bullet at over 2700 feet per second for 4,900 ft.-lbs. of energy. It has never emerged as a production cartridge and has had very limited success, overshadowed by the more popular .375 caliber commercial and custom cartridges.

== See also ==
- 8 mm caliber
- Handloading
- List of rifle cartridges
- Table of handgun and rifle cartridges
