= R93 =

R93 may refer to:

- Blaser R93, a German rifle
  - Blaser R93 Tactical, a sniper rifle
- HMS Vigilant (R93), a destroyer of the Royal Navy
