= 8×68mm S =

1930s German rifle cartridge

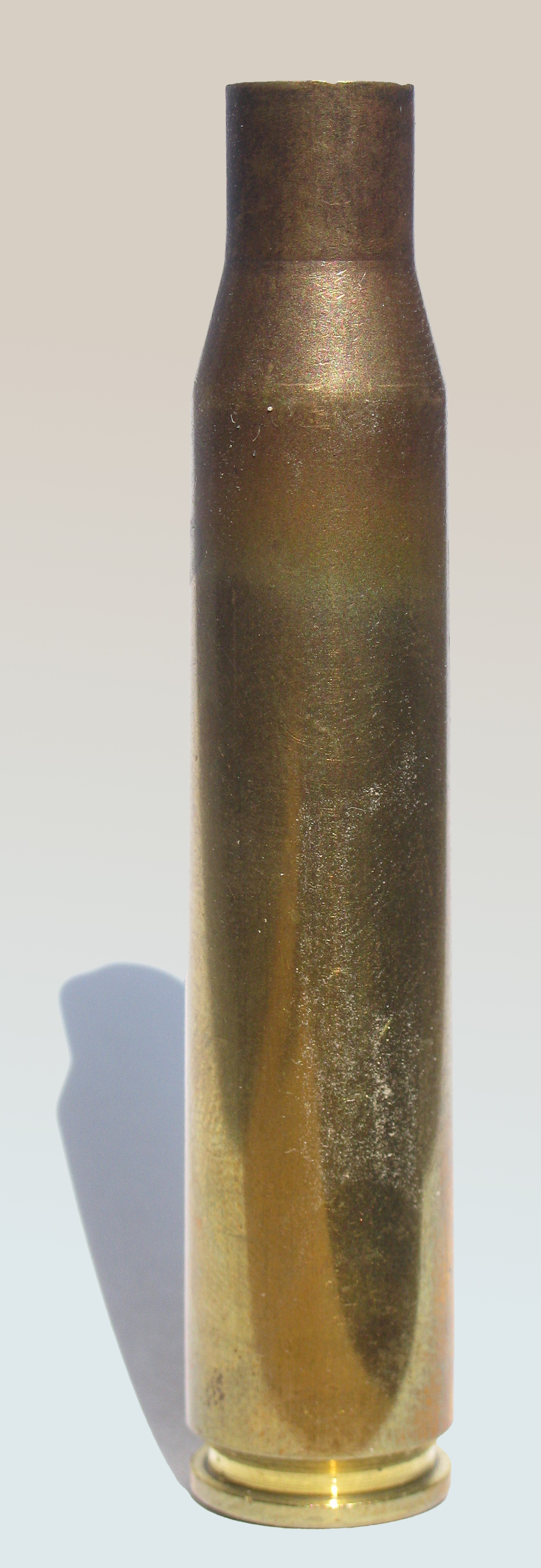
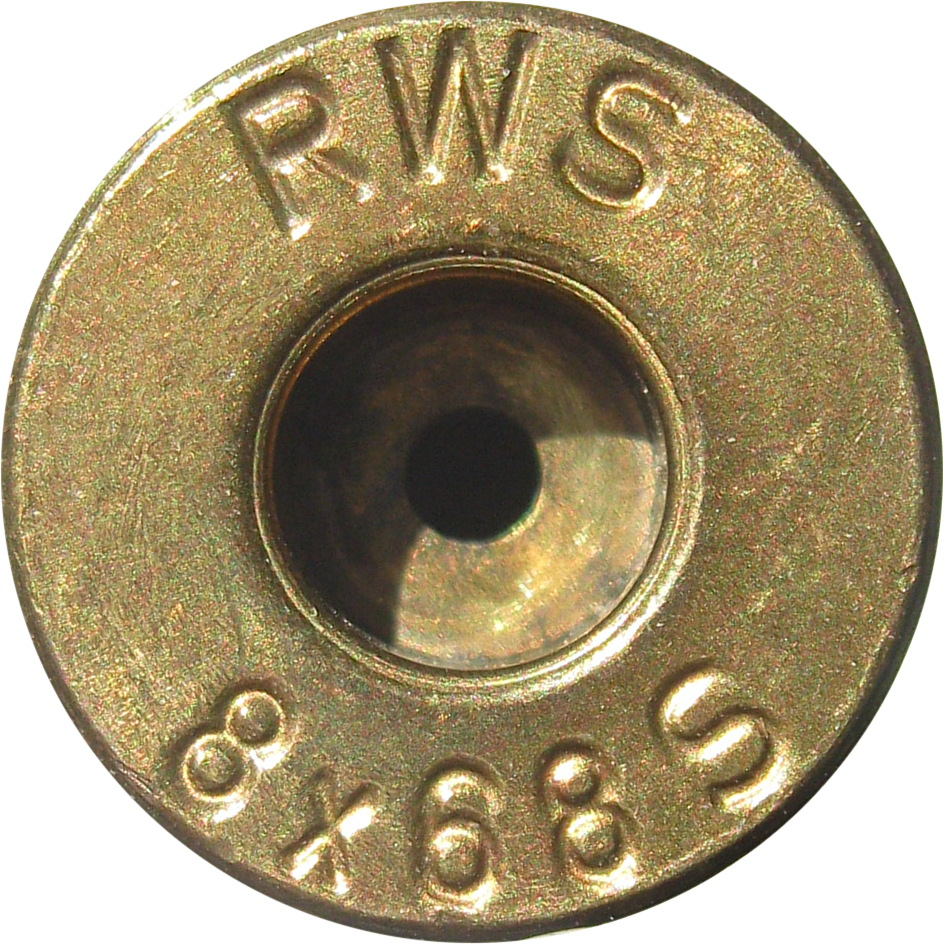
- 8×68mm S cartridge case and headstamp
- Type: Rifle
- Place of origin: Weimar Republic, Nazi Germany

Service history
- In service: Never issued

Production history
- Designer: August Schüler
- Designed: 1939
- Produced: 1939–present

Specifications
- Parent case: Unique
- Case type: Rimless, bottleneck
- Bullet diameter: 8.22 mm (0.324 in)
- Neck diameter: 9.14 mm (0.360 in)
- Shoulder diameter: 12.15 mm (0.478 in)
- Base diameter: 13.30 mm (0.524 in)
- Rim diameter: 13.00 mm (0.512 in)
- Rim thickness: 1.40 mm (0.055 in)
- Case length: 67.50 mm (2.657 in)
- Overall length: 87.00 mm (3.425 in)
- Case capacity: 5.58 cm^{3} (86.1 gr H_{2}O)
- Rifling twist: 280 mm (1 in 11.02 in)
- Primer type: Large rifle magnum
- Maximum pressure: 440.0 MPa (63,820 psi)

Ballistic performance
Bullet mass/type	Velocity	Energy
11.7 g (181 gr) RWS DK	945 m/s (3,100 ft/s)	5,224 J (3,853 ft⋅lbf)
11.7 g (181 gr) RWS KS	990 m/s (3,200 ft/s)	5,734 J (4,229 ft⋅lbf)
12.1 g (187 gr) RWS HMK	970 m/s (3,200 ft/s)	5,692 J (4,198 ft⋅lbf)
13.0 g (201 gr) RWS EVO	915 m/s (3,000 ft/s)	5,442 J (4,014 ft⋅lbf)
14.5 g (224 gr) RWS KS	870 m/s (2,900 ft/s)	5,488 J (4,048 ft⋅lbf)
- Test barrel length: 650 mm (25.6 in); Source: RWS / RUAG Ammotech

The 8×68mm S rebated rim bottlenecked centerfire rifle cartridge was developed in the 1930s by August Schüler of the August Schüler Waffenfabrik, Suhl, Germany as a magnum hunting cartridge that would just fit and function in standard-sized Mauser 98 bolt-action rifles. The bore has the same lands and grooves diameters as the German 7.92×57mm Mauser service cartridge (designated as "S-bore"). This is one of the early examples where a completely new rifle cartridge (the 6.5×68mm and 8×68mm S have no other cartridge as parent case) was developed by a gunsmith to fit a specific popular and widespread type of rifle.

== History ==
The German ammunition manufacturer Rheinisch-Westfälische Sprengstoff-Fabriken (RWS) introduced both cartridges commercially in the spring of 1939. With the official certification of the .375 Hölderlin and the 8.5×68mm Fanzoj this German 68 mm "family" of magnum rifle cartridges that all share the same basic cartridge case got expanded in the 21st century.

The cartridges in this German 68 mm cartridge "family" are, in the order of development:

- 8×68mm S (1939)
- 6.5×68mm (1939)
- .375 Hölderlin (9.5×68mm) (2007)
- 8.5×68mm Fanzoj (2012)

The M 98 bolt actions and magazine boxes of standard military Mauser 98 rifles have to be adapted by a competent gunsmith to function properly with 8×68mm S cartridges, since the M98 internal magazine boxes feature an internal magazine length of 84 mm (3.31 in) and 8×68mm S cartridge cases have a significantly larger diameter than 8×57mm IS service cartridges. In properly adapted standard military Gewehr 98 or Karabiner 98k service rifles the large 8×68mm S cartridges are however praised for very smooth and reliable feeding.

The widespread availability of standard size Mauser 98 rifles and the fact that the .375 H&H Magnum cartridge and its necked down version the .300 H&H Magnum with approximately 72 mm (2.83 in) case length were too long to fit in standard sized Mauser 98 bolt-action rifles makes the shorter 8×68mm S, 6.5×68mm and .375 Hölderlin interesting chambering options.

World War II spoiled the commercial introduction and spread of the 8×68mm S amongst German hunters. The cartridge became popular due to its high performance and flat trajectory popular after World War II when German hunters in the 1950s were again allowed to own and hunt with full bore rifles. The 8×68mm S performance was also made available to hunters who previously had problems with handling magnum cartridge recoil and had stepped down to less powerful but for German conditions adequate medium cartridges like the 8×57mm IS, 7×64mm (Brenneke) or .30-06 Springfield (also known as the 7.62×63mm in metric countries). This was accomplished by fitting an efficient muzzle brake to significantly reduce the amount of recoil for recoil sensitive shooters. With the help of a muzzle brake the 8×68mm S recoil is reduced to tolerable levels.

== Cartridge dimensions ==
Extremely thick brass results in 'only' 5.58 ml (86 grains) H_{2}O cartridge case capacity for the 8×68mm S. A rare feature of this German rimless bottlenecked centerfire cartridge design is that it has a slightly rebated rim (P1 - R1 = 0.3 mm). A sign of the era in which the 8×68mm S was developed are the gently sloped shoulders. The exterior shape of the case was designed to promote reliable case feeding and extraction in bolt-action rifles, under extreme conditions.

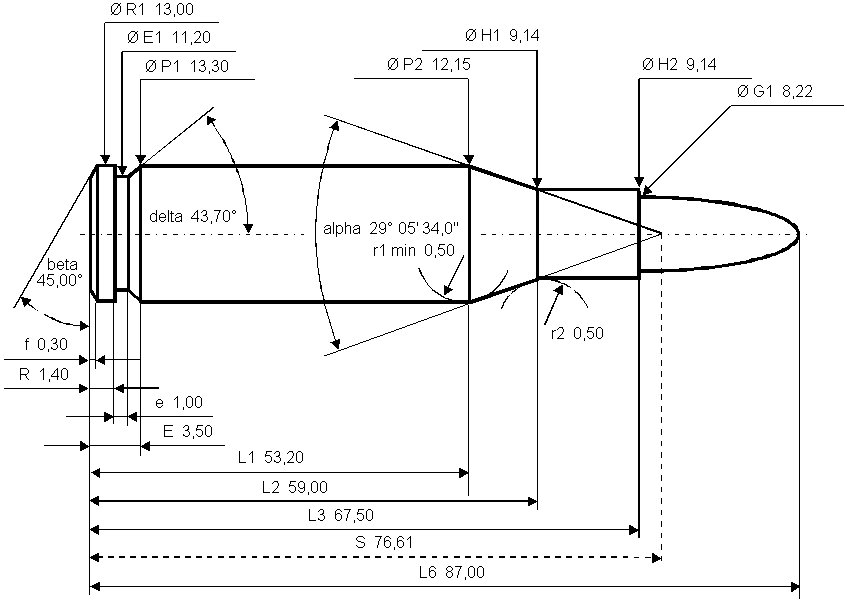

8×68mm S maximum C.I.P. cartridge dimensions. All sizes in millimetres (mm).

Americans would define the shoulder angle at alpha/2 ≈ 14.53 degrees. The common rifling twist rate for this cartridge is 280 mm (1 in 11.02 in), 4 grooves, Ø lands = 7.89 mm, Ø grooves = 8.20 mm, land width = 4.40 mm and the primer type is large rifle magnum.

According to the official C.I.P. (Commission Internationale Permanente pour l'Epreuve des Armes à Feu Portatives) guidelines the 8×68mm S case can handle up to 440.00 MPa (63,817 psi) piezo pressure. In C.I.P. regulated countries every rifle cartridge combo has to be proofed at 125% of this maximum C.I.P. pressure to certify for sale to consumers.

This means that 8×68mm S chambered arms in C.I.P. regulated countries are currently (2014) proof tested at 550.00 MPa (79,771 psi) PE piezo pressure.

The American .325 WSM cartridge introduced in 2005 is probably the closest ballistic twin of the 8×68mm S. The .325 WSM is considerably shorter and fatter and has a more radical rebated rim (P1 -R 1 = 0.51 mm), much steeper shoulder angle (70 degrees / 35 degrees for Americans) and a shorter neck (7.82 mm). This makes the 8×68mm S case with its 9.11 mm long neck better suited for loading long heavier bullets and due to its sleeker exterior shape bound to cycle more reliably in bolt-action rifles in extreme situations.

== The 8×68mm S in field use ==
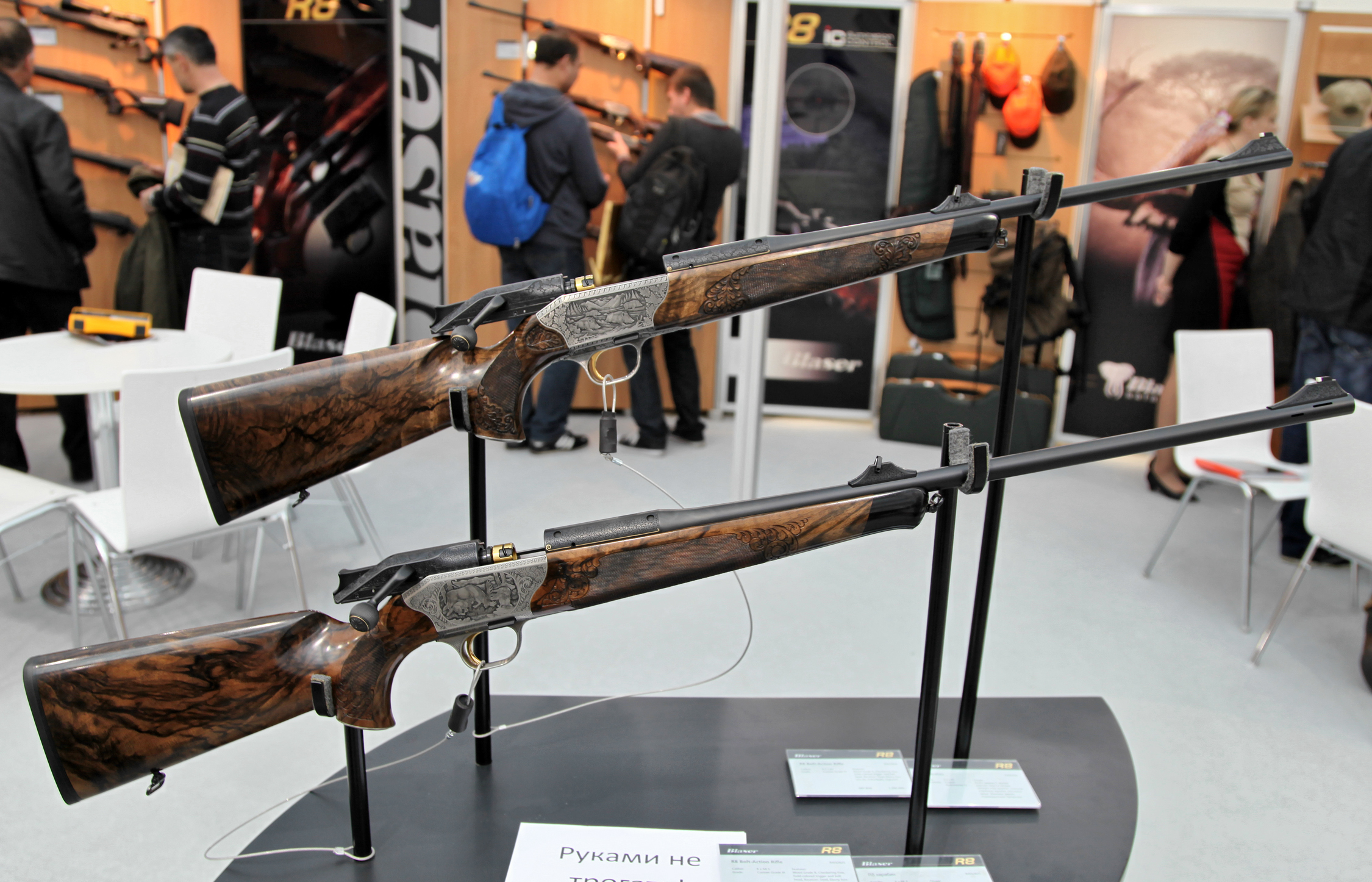
A Blaser R8 Custom Grade II straight-pull bolt action hunting rifle chambered in 8×68mm S

German big game hunters often use 8×68mm S rifles in Africa for hunting plains game, where American hunters would choose one of the .30 or .338 magnum cartridges. The 8×68mm S as a pure civil cartridge can be used in countries which ban civil use of former or current military ammunition.

Since there are not many factory loads available RWS currently (2007) offers 5 factory loads) and due to its good field reputation and efficiency, the 8×68mm S is often used by reloaders. For a magnum chambering it also offers a tolerable amount of barrel wear, which is important to users that fire many rounds a year. This was achieved by coupling a sensible case volume (5.58 ml) to bore area (51.78 mm^{2}/0.5178 cm^{2}) ratio (10.78 O_{ratio}). They have used this cartridge extensively to create powerful loads by handloading. Whilst staying within the 440 MPa C.I.P. limit an 8×68mm S rifle with a 650 mm (25.59 in) long barrel and appropriate modern gun propellants (Vihtavuori N560) can be handloaded to propel a 12.96 gram (200 gr) 8 mm bullet like the Sierra MatchKing to a muzzle velocity of 927 m/s (3042 ft/s).

The 8×68mm S has a good long range accuracy reputation i.e. it is not hard to develop or find loads that will shoot 1 MoA or better out of decent standard mass-produced rifles. Factory 8×68mm S rifles often have a 650 mm or 26 in barrel with a 280 mm (1 in 11 in) twist rate, which works well in daily life. This twist rate was chosen since the bullet jackets used in the 1930s were not strong enough to cope with the forces generated by the magnum muzzle velocities of the 8×68mm S. The 240 mm (1 in 9.45 in) twist rate normally found in the 8×57mm IS makes the 8×68mm S combined with modern bullets with jackets designed for magnum cartridges an excellent long range cartridge.

Reloaders use the 8×68mm S as a utility cartridge on all European game from fox, roe deer and chamois upwards to the big European game like red deer, moose and brown bear. These people realized that bullets with different characteristics can be utilized to produce varying effects on game. They also realized that from 8 mm caliber upwards the rise of sectional density and penetrating capability of practical spin stabilized rifle bullets (bullets up to 5 to 5.5 calibers in length) tends to flatten out.

This means that loaded with light, short and soft-nosed 8 mm bullets the 8×68mm S can be used on remarkably small game. Loaded with heavy, long and hard (solid copper alloy) bullets the 8×68mm S offers enough speed derived power to penetrate heavy and dangerous game. The 8×68mm S is suitable for hunting almost any game animal on the planet, though certain sub-Saharan Africa countries have a .375 in minimum caliber requirement for hunting dangerous Big Five game - i.e. leopard, lion, cape buffalo, rhinoceros and elephant. In African countries, where there are no ammunition limits for hunting Big Five game, the 8×68mm S is used successfully for hunting elephant. In Namibia the 8×68mm S is legal for hunting Big Five game if the loads have ≥ 5,400 J (3,983 ft⋅lbf) muzzle energy. So it often is used for cape buffalo, with bullets like the 14.26 gram (220 gr) Swift A-Frame, for example.

== 8 mm cartridges compared ==
Maximum muzzle velocity comparison in % of the probably most proliferated European and American 8 mm rifle cartridges out of 650 mm (25.59 in) long barrels loaded with relatively light to heavy 8 mm bullets to their C.I.P. or SAAMI (Sporting Arms and Ammunition Manufacturers’ Institute) sanctioned maximum pressures.

Bullet weight gram (grain)	8.23 g (127 gr)	9.72 g (150 gr)	11.34 g (175 gr)	12.96 g (200 gr)	14.26 g (220 gr)	Case capacity (%)
7.92×57mm Mauser (8×57mm IS)	100.0	100.0	100.0	100.0	100.0	100.0
8×64mm S	102.7	102.7	102.8	102.9	102.9	110.3
.325 WSM	108.7	109.1	109.0	109.3	111.1	131.7
8×68mm S	108.4	108.5	108.7	110.5	112.3	136.5
8 mm Rem. Mag.	111.9	112.3	114.5	115.3	116.0	157.1

This comparison is not totally objective since the 8mm Remington Magnum operates at 460 MPa (66717 psi), the .325 Winchester Short Magnum at 435 MPa (63,091 psi), the 8 × 68 S at 440 MPa (63817 psi), the 8×64mm S at 405 MPa (58740 psi) and the 7.92×57mm Mauser at 390 MPa (56564 psi) maximum chamber piezo pressure. Higher chamber pressure results in higher muzzle velocities.

== The 8×68mm S as parent case ==
=== The .375 Hölderlin ===
The 8×68mm S case has functioned as the parent case for the .375 Hölderlin (9.5×68mm), which is essentially a 9.53 mm (.375 caliber) necked-up version of the 8×68mm S. The wildcat status of the .375 Hölderlin ended in 2007 when it got C.I.P. certified and became an officially registered and sanctioned under the 375 Hölderlin designation member of the German 68 mm "family" of magnum rifle cartridges. If the .375 Hölderlin will become available as factory ammunition, like the older cartridge "family" members (8×68mm S and 6.5×68mm), is still unknown.

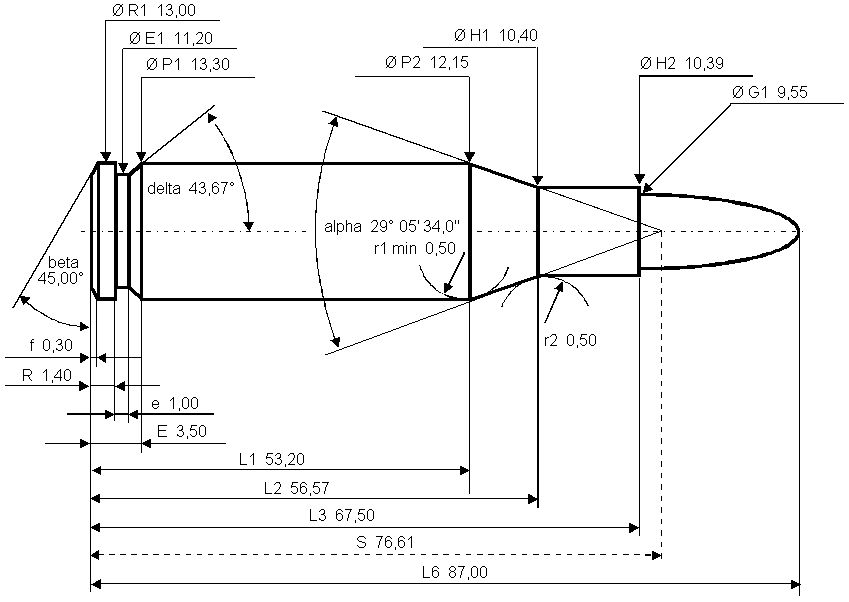

.375 Hölderlin maximum C.I.P. cartridge dimensions. All sizes in millimetres (mm).

Americans would define the shoulder angle at alpha/2 ≈ 14.53 degrees. The common rifling twist rate for this cartridge is 305 mm (1 in 12 in), 6 grooves, Ø lands = 9.30 mm, Ø grooves = 9.55 mm, land width = 2.92 mm and the primer type is large rifle magnum.

The .375 Hölderlin has 5.65 ml (87 grains) H_{2}O cartridge case capacity. According to the official C.I.P. guidelines, the .375 Hölderlin case can handle up to 380 MPa piezo pressure.

According to the creator of the .375 Hölderlin, Mr. C. Otterbein, the idea behind the .375 Hölderlin was to develop a big-game cartridge based on a German cartridge case for standard-sized Mauser 98 bolt-action rifles. The ballistic performance had to be close to or equal the performance of the .375 Holland & Holland Magnum. The 8×68mm S was chosen as parent case, since it offers enough case capacity, and a competent gunsmith can relatively easily rechamber a standard Mauser 98 rifle to accept 8×68mm S-based cartridges. To keep costs down and promote an acceptable recoil level blowing out, the parent case was renounced.

=== Wildcats ===
Cartridges that are not officially registered with nor sanctioned by C.I.P. (Commission Internationale Permanente pour l'Epreuve des Armes à Feu Portatives) or its American equivalent, SAAMI (Sporting Arms and Ammunition Manufacturers’ Institute) are generally known as wildcats. By blowing out standard factory cases the wildcatter generally hopes to gain extra muzzle velocity by increasing the case capacity of the factory parent cartridge case by a few percent. Practically there can be some muzzle velocity gained by this method, but the measured results between parent cartridges and their 'improved' wildcat offspring is often marginal. Besides changing the shape and internal volume of the parent cartridge case, wildcatters also can change the original caliber. A reason to change the original caliber can be to comply with a minimal permitted caliber or bullet weight for the legal hunting of certain species of game.

Wildcats are not governed by C.I.P. or SAAMI rules so wildcatters can capitalize the achievable high operating pressures. It is often reported that modern 68 mm RWS brass can tolerate up to 500 MPa (72519 psi) piezo pressure. Because the 8×68mm S offers an exceptional sturdy, pressure resistant cartridge case that can relatively easily be reloaded with primers, powder and bullets and hence be reused several times it has become quite popular amongst wildcatters. With the 8×68mm S as the parent case wildcatters have created .25×68, .270×68, 7×68mm, .30×68, .338×68, .375×68 or .416×68 variants. Improved or blown out 68 mm cartridge designs are reported to come performance wise close to the 8mm Remington Magnum which has about 14% more case capacity then the standard 8×68mm S.

Examples of 8×68mm S based wildcats are the relatively well known American 7 mm and .30 caliber Boo Boo and 7 mm and .30 HV wildcats. The Boo Boo wildcats were developed for long range target shooting where participants usually handload their ammunition. Several 1,000 yard shooting competitions have been won with Boo Boo wildcats. A wildcat from Europe that uses the 8×68mm S as its parent case is the .30 Kovacs. It was designed in 1996 by Stefan Kovács, Austria-7041 Wulkaprodersdorf. The .30 Kovacs has much more powder-room (longer L2, wider P2, 40 degree Ackley-shoulder) then its parental case. It falls powder-room-wise between the .300 Winchester Magnum and .300 Weatherby Magnum but has energy and velocity falling between .300 Weatherby Magnum and the .300 Remington Ultra Magnum. This wildcat cartridge will be fitted only by Büchsenmachermeister Egon Kriebernegg. Another European wildcat based on the 8×68mm S is the .300 Styria Magnum. It was developed by Ing. Michael W. Mayerl from the Styria Arms company in Austria in 2005 as a reliable beltless high power cartridge for Mauser 98 rifles. The parent case is shortened to 65 mm (2.559 in) case length and necked down to 7.82 mm (.308 in) calibre. The shoulder angle is the same as the 8×68mm S so fire forming is not necessary and no new headspace gages are needed. The development goal of this cartridge was to get a highly reliable .30-calibre magnum cartridge that fits in the standard Mauser 98 action without any modification of the feeding lips, follower, feeding ramp or magazine length. Only the bolt face must be opened to a diameter of 13.3 mm (0.524 in). The throat of the .300 Styria Magnum is similar to the proven .308 Winchester and short enough to seat the bullets to the lands without exceeding the maximum length of 84.8 mm (3.339 in) to fit the original Mauser 98 magazine. The thick-walled 8×68mm S parent case manufactured by RWS can handle a usage piezo pressure up to 460 MPa (66717 psi).

== See also ==
- 8 mm caliber
- List of firearms
- List of rifle cartridges
- Table of handgun and rifle cartridges
