= Blaser F3 =

- Type: Shotgun
- Place of origin: Germany

Production history
- Manufacturer: Blaser Jagdwaffen GmbH

Specifications
- Mass: approx. 9 lbs
- Cartridge: 12, 20, 28- gauge shells
- Caliber: 12, 20, 28 gauge
- Barrels: 28", 30", 32",34"
- Action: break-action

The Blaser F3 is a break-action over-and-under shotgun manufactured by Blaser Jagdwaffen GmbH of Isny, Germany. It was introduced in 2004 and imported by Blaser USA of San Antonio, TX since 2008. Blaser manufactures multiple variants of the F3. Blaser has established itself in the European market in Skeet and the Olympic trap disciplines. While other competition grade shotguns require fitting when changing barrels, Blaser has a largely modular design.

== See also ==
- List of shotguns
