= Blaser =

German firearms manufacturer

- Industry: Firearms
- Founded: 1957; 69 years ago
- Founder: Horst Blaser
- Headquarters: Isny im Allgäu, Germany
- Products: Hunting Rifles, Shotguns
- Owner: Lüke & Ortmeier Gruppe
- Number of employees: 350
- Divisions: Blaser USA
- Website: blaser.de blaser-usa.com

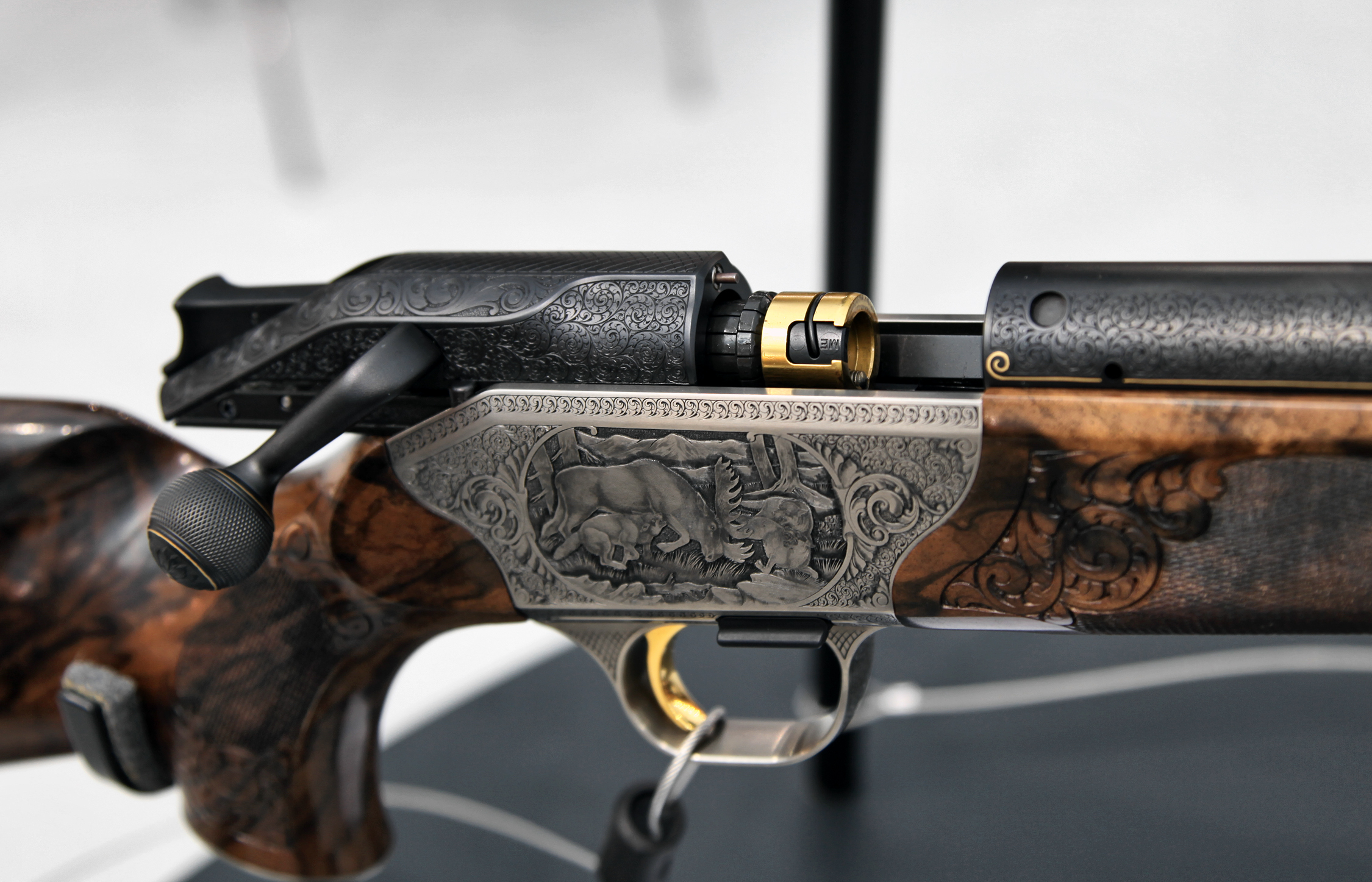
9.3×62mm Blaser R8 Custom Grade IV

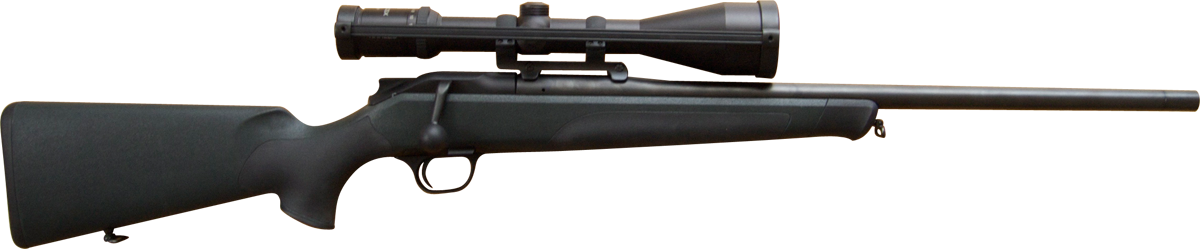
Blaser R8

Blaser Jagdwaffen GmbH (pronounced: Blah-zer) is a German firearms manufacturer of high-end shotguns and rifles both for the hunting and tactical market. It was founded in 1957 by Horst Blaser, developing the drilling Blaser Diplomat. In September 2008, Blaser established an office in San Antonio, Texas.

== History ==
In 1993, Blaser developed the Blaser R93 straight-pull bolt-action hunting rifle, a major success in the European market because of its main focus in security and innovative bolt-action design. Blaser makes their barrels by hammer forging. The R93 series can change calibers in minutes with very little effort. In the first 10 years, over 100,000 of the R93 Action-Bolt rifles were fabricated. When production of the R93 ended in 2016/2017, there had been produced more than 200000 complete R93 rifles. In 2015 there had been produced more than 100000 complete Blaser R8 rifles.

Blaser merged with SIGARMS in 1997, but continues autonomously producing and developing hunting rifles. In 1999 SIGARMS began distribution of Blaser in the USA.

Today, its product portfolio includes straight pull model Blaser R8, combination guns (Drillings and Double rifles), shotguns (Blaser F3 and F16), and single shot rifles.

== Sport Optics ==
In 2017 Blaser started producing binoculars and the following year also telescopic sights and Reflector sight called RD 17. All of the Blaser sport optics products are price positioned in the highest premium class. The following models are currently available.

=== Binoculars ===
- Primus 8x30
- Primus 8x42
- Primus 10x42
- Primus 8x56

All Blaser binoculars feature Abbe-Koenig prisms.

=== Rifle scopes ===
- Infinity 1-7x28 iC
- Infinity 2.8-20x50 iC
- Infinity 4-20x58 iC

All Blaser Infinity rifle scopes have a 36mm main tube and can only be mounted with rail. The rail standard used is the Zeiss ZM/VM type.

=== Red Dot Sights ===
- RD 20 red dot

The RD 20 comes with original Blaser saddle mount included.

== See also ==
- SIG Sauer
- Mauser Jagdwaffen GmbH
- Lynx Rifles
