= Roller locked =

Firearm locking method

In firearms operating systems, the term roller locked refers to locking the bolt with rollers. Notable examples of firearms using this method are the Polish wz.37 semi-automatic rifle designed by Edward Stecke, MG 42 general-purpose machine gun, which copied the solution of engineer Stecke and the CZ 52 semi-automatic pistol. It was also applied in the experimental Gerät 03 semi-automatic rifle and Gerät 06 and EM-1 experimental assault rifles. The MG 42's lineage continued past World War II, forming the basis for the nearly identical MG1 (MG 42/59), chambered in 7.62×51mm NATO, which subsequently evolved into the MG1A3, and later the Bundeswehr's MG 3, Italian MG 42/59, and Austrian MG 74. It also spawned the Yugoslav unlicensed nearly identical Zastava M53.

== History ==
The origin of the roller-locking is debated: even though the general principle of utilizing "ball bearing parts" under radial pressure "for preventing uncoupling of the coupling members" was known no later than 1910s, it was apparently not used in firearms until 1930s. The first rifle to use a solution similar to the modern one was the Polish experimental semi-automatic rifle wz.37 designed by engineer Edward Stecke. However, it did not use rollers, only longitudinal locking elements. Probably based on its design, the Germans developed the MG42, replacing the longitudinal locking elements with rollers.

== Mechanism ==
roller locked action diagram

In roller-locked arms in the locked position during firing, the rollers rest on parallel surfaces relative to the bore axis on the bolt head, so no amount of force pushing back on the bolt can cause the bolt to unlock. When chambering a fresh cartridge the bolt head is used to push out the rollers. For that the bolt head ends in an angled/oblique wedge to smoothly move the rollers outwards into their lockup position.

Roller locking is used by the CZ 52 pistol. The slide, barrel, locking piece, and rollers are shown here.

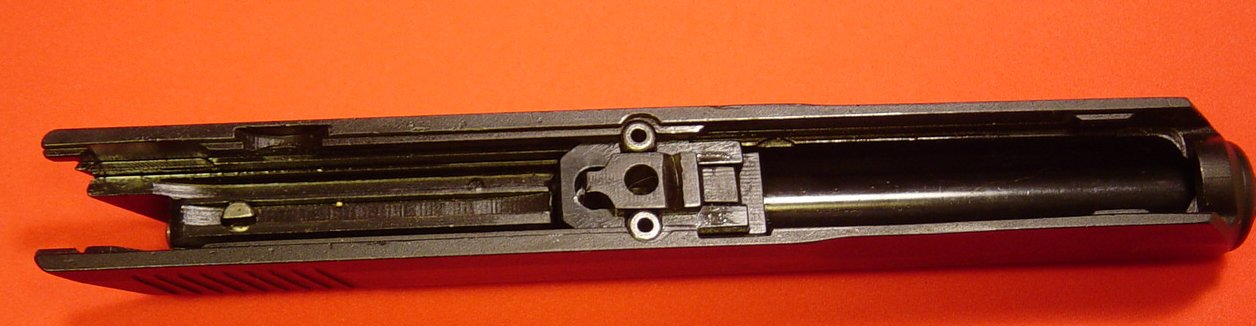
Barrel, slide and locking piece, locked.

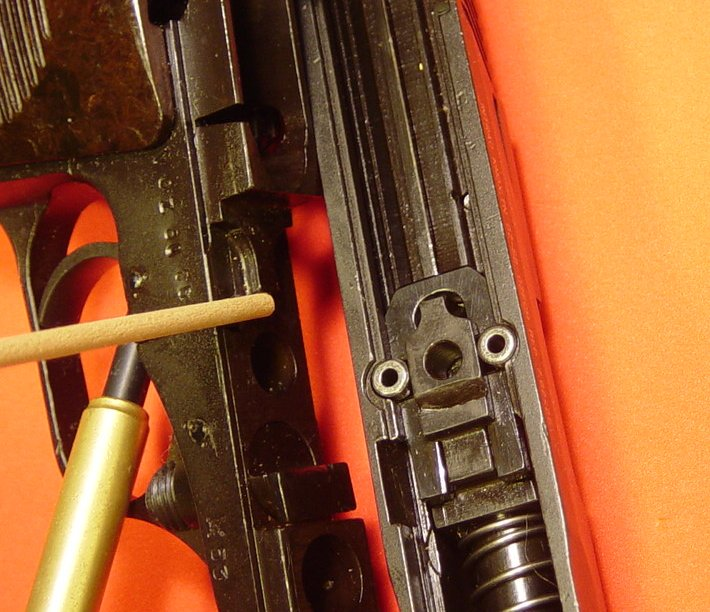
Unlocking tab.

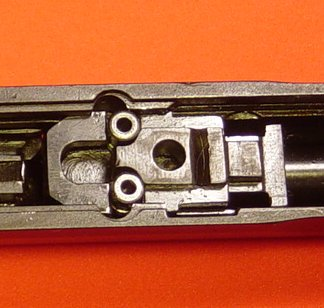
Beginning of unlock.

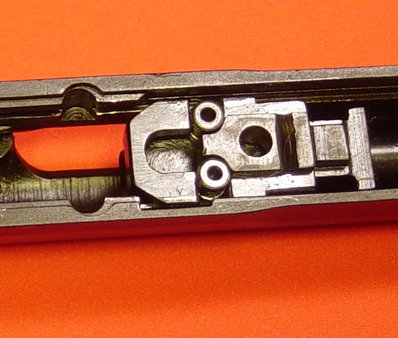
Fully unlocked.

Normally the recoil spring pushes the locking piece rearward, which in turn pushes the barrel back and holds the locking rollers. (In some of these pictures the spring is removed.)

When the gun is fired, the barrel, slide, and locking piece (right side of picture) will move backward a short distance, while the locking piece will be stopped by a tab on the frame, shown on the left with a stick pointing out the mating surface.

With the locking piece stopped by the tab, the rollers will continue rearward with the slide, until they reach the recessed portion of the locking piece. The rollers will then be allowed to move inward and release from their indentations in the slide, releasing the slide from the barrel.

At about the same time, the barrel will be stopped by the locking piece. Momentum will carry the slide back against the pressure of the recoil spring where extraction and feeding of a fresh cartridge happen similarly to other designs.

As the slide moves forward, the locking piece maintains outward pressure on the rollers. When the recesses in the slide are positioned with the rollers, the locking piece will push them out into the recesses and move forward, locking the barrel to the slide again, the barrel and slide will move forward a small amount and stop. Unlike a standard Browning short-recoil action, there is no tipping of the barrel during operation.

== Platforms ==
Name	Cartrdige	Firearm type	Type
MG 42	7.92×57mm Mauser	Machine gun	Recoil operation
MG 3 machine gun	7.62×51mm NATO	Machine gun	Recoil operation
EM-1 rifle		Assault rifle	Recoil operation
CZ 52	7.62×25mm Tokarev	Semi-automatic pistol	Recoil operation
Edward Stecke wz.37		Semi-automatic rifle	
TRW Low Maintenance Rifle	5.6mm XM216	Automatic gun	
Wolf Ultramatic	9×19mm Parabellum,.40 S&W	Semi-automatic pistol	Gas-operated reloading
Gerät 03	7.92×57mm Mauser	Semi-automatic rifle	Gas-operated reloading
Gerät 06	7.92×33mm Kurz	Assault rifle	Gas-operated reloading

== Other locking systems with similarities ==
- Roller-delayed blowback as in the HK G3, where similar rollers are used is sometimes mistakenly called roller locked, but there is no genuine locking of the bolt and no recoiling of the barrel in delayed blowback action as the rollers rest on angled/oblique surfaces, so applying a backward force on the bolt will cause it to unlock.
- The flapper locking method and roller locking are similar in concept.
- The ball-bearing roller locking system used in straight-pull rifles like the Anschütz 1827 Fortner, Crossfire MK1, Heym SR 30 and Savage Impulse.
- Bearing-delayed blowback as in the Mean arms upper receiver for an AR-15–style rifle.
- The collet locking system used in the Blaser R8/R93/Blaser Tactical and Thompson .30-06 prototype which uses an expanding collet in a similar fashion.

== See also ==
- Rotating bolt
- Interrupted screw
