= 6.5×68mm =

German rifle cartridge

- Type: Rifle
- Place of origin: Germany

Service history
- In service: Never issued

Production history
- Designer: August Schüler
- Designed: 1939
- Produced: 1939–present
- Variants: 6.5×68m R (rimmed)

Specifications
- Parent case: 8×68mm S
- Case type: Rimless, bottleneck
- Bullet diameter: 6.70 mm (0.264 in)
- Neck diameter: 7.60 mm (0.299 in)
- Shoulder diameter: 12.18 mm (0.480 in)
- Base diameter: 13.30 mm (0.524 in)
- Rim diameter: 13.00 mm (0.512 in)
- Rim thickness: 1.40 mm (0.055 in)
- Case length: 67.50 mm (2.657 in)
- Overall length: 86.50 mm (3.406 in)
- Case capacity: 5.58 cm^{3} (86.1 gr H_{2}O)
- Rifling twist: 250 mm (1 in 9.84 in)
- Primer type: Large rifle magnum
- Maximum pressure: 440 MPa (64,000 psi)

Ballistic performance
Bullet mass/type	Velocity	Energy
6 g (93 gr) RWS TMS	1,150 m/s (3,800 ft/s)	3,968 J (2,927 ft⋅lbf)
8.2 g (127 gr) RWS KS	960 m/s (3,100 ft/s)	3,779 J (2,787 ft⋅lbf)
- Test barrel length: 650 mm (25.59 in); Source(s): RWS / RUAG Ammotech

The 6.5×68mm rebated rim bottlenecked centerfire rifle cartridge (also known as the 6.5×68mm RWS, 6.5×68mm Schüler, or the 6.5×68mm Von Hofe Express) and its sister cartridge the 8×68mm S were developed in the 1930s by August Schüler from the August Schüler Waffenfabrik, Suhl, Germany as magnum hunting cartridges that would just fit and function in standard-sized Mauser 98 bolt-action rifles. This is one of the early examples where a completely new rifle cartridge (the 6.5×68mm and 8×68mm S have no other cartridge as parent case) was developed by a gunsmith to fit a specific popular and widespread type of rifle.

== History ==
The German ammunition manufacturer Rheinisch-Westfälischen Sprengstofffabrik (RWS) introduced both cartridges commercially in the spring of 1939. With the official certification of the .375 Hölderlin and the 8.5×68mm Fanzoj this German 68 mm "family" of magnum rifle cartridges that all share the same basic cartridge case got expanded in the 21st century.

The cartridges in this German 68 mm cartridge "family" are, in the order of development:

- 8×68mm S (1939)
- 6.5×68mm (1939)
- .375 Hölderlin (9.5×68mm) (2007)
- 8.5×68mm Fanzoj (2012)

The M 98 bolt actions and magazine boxes of standard military Mauser 98 rifles have to be adapted by a competent gunsmith to function properly with these magnum cartridges since the cases are longer and have a larger diameter than the 8×57mm service cartridges. In properly adapted standard military Gewehr 98 or Karabiner 98k service rifles the large 6.5×68mm cartridges are, however, praised for very smooth and reliable feeding.

The widespread availability of standard size Mauser 98 rifles and the fact that the .375 H&H Magnum cartridge and its necked down version the .300 H&H Magnum with approximately 72.4 mm case length were too long to fit in standard sized Mauser 98 bolt-action rifles makes the shorter 6.5×68mm, 8×68mm S and .375 Hölderlin interesting chambering options.

World War II spoiled the commercial introduction and spread of the 6.5×68mm. The cartridge became popular after World War II due to its high performance and flat trajectory, when German hunters were allowed again to own and hunt with full bore rifles. The 6.5×68mm's performance also made it that hunters who had problems with handling magnum cartridge recoil stepped down to less powerful but adequate medium cartridges like the 6.5×57mm Mauser, 7.92×57mm Mauser, 7×64mm (Brenneke) or .30-06 Springfield (also known as the 7.62×63mm in metric countries). Recoil sensitive shooters can fit an efficient muzzle brake to significantly reduce the amount of recoil. With the help of a muzzle brake, the 6.5×68mm's recoil is reduced to tolerable levels.

== Cartridge dimensions ==
Extremely thick brass results in 'only' 5.58 ml (86 grains) H_{2}O cartridge case capacity for the 6.5×68mm. A rare feature of this German rimless bottlenecked centerfire cartridge design is that it has a slightly rebated rim (P1-R1 = 0.3 mm). A sign of the era in which the 6.5×68mm was developed are the gently sloped shoulders. The exterior shape of the case was designed to promote reliable case feeding and extraction in bolt-action rifles, under extreme conditions.

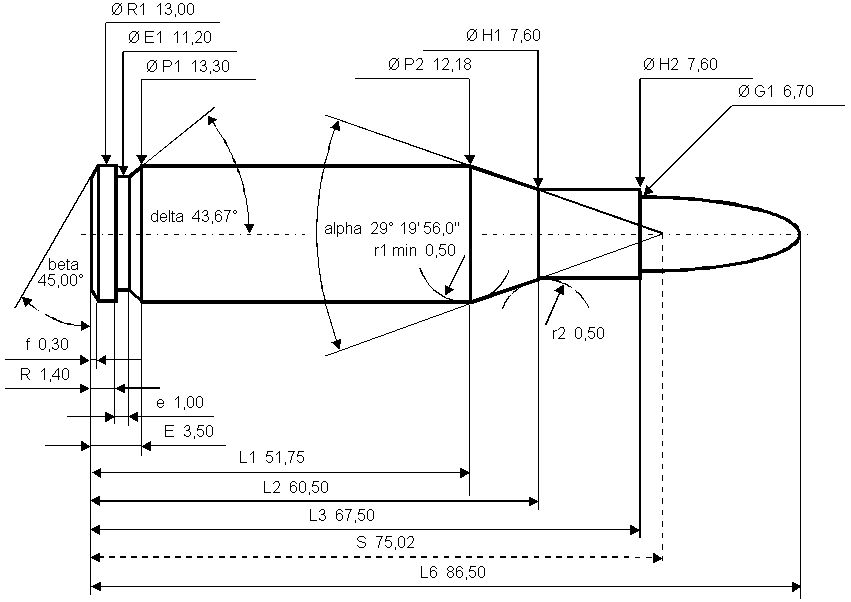

6.5×68mm maximum C.I.P. cartridge dimensions. All sizes in millimetres (mm).

Americans would define the shoulder angle at alpha/2 ≈ 14.53 degrees. The common rifling twist rate for this cartridge is 250 mm (1 in 9.84 in), 4 grooves, Ø lands = 6.45 mm, Ø grooves = 6.70 mm, land width = 3.50 mm and the primer type is large rifle magnum.

According to the official C.I.P. (Commission Internationale Permanente pour l'Epreuve des Armes à Feu Portatives) guidelines the 6.5×68mm case can handle up to 440 MPa (63817 psi) piezo pressure. In C.I.P. regulated countries every rifle cartridge combo has to be proofed at 125% of this maximum C.I.P. pressure to certify for sale to consumers.

When the 6.5×68mm was introduced in 1939 it probably held the title of fastest production cartridge on the market. Nowadays there are commercial cartridges on the market which offer even higher muzzle velocities.

The American .264 Winchester Magnum cartridge introduced in 1959 and the French 6.5×63mm Messner Magnum are probably the closest ballistic twins of the 6.5×68mm.

== The 6.5×68mm in field use ==
German and Austrian hunters use the powerful, high velocity 6.5×68mm for long-range hunting in mountainous terrain like the Alps mountain range. The 6.5×68mm as a pure civil cartridge can be used in countries which ban civil use of former or current military ammunition.

Since there are not many factory loads available (RWS offers only 2 factory loads) and due to its good field reputation, the 6.5×68mm is often used by reloaders. They have used this cartridge extensively to create powerful loads by handloading.

Factory rifles in 6.5×68mm normally have 250 mm to 280 mm (1 in 9.8 to 11 inch) twist rates, which are too slow to adequately stabilize modern long heavy 6.5 mm bullets. This slow twist rate was chosen since the bullet jackets used in the 1930s were not strong enough to cope with the forces generated by the magnum muzzle velocities of the 6.5×68mm. The traditional 6.5×68mm twists nowadays inhibits its potential. To make the 6.5×68mm an awesome long-range cartridge, rifle barrels with a 200 mm to 230 mm (1 in 7.9 to 9 inch) twist rate are a better choice. Due to the large case capacity in relation to the 6.5 mm (.264 inch) caliber bore size the 6.5×68mm is very harsh on barrels. The 6.5×68mm typically wears out a rifle barrel in 500 to 1000 rounds. A lot of thorough barrel cleaning (after every 5 shots) and carefully avoiding long strings of shots help to minimize barrel wear. This makes this cartridge impractical for most competition shooters who tend to fire a lot of rounds in practice to acquire and maintain expert long-range marksmanship.

Reloaders use the 6.5×68mm as a Jack of all trades long-range cartridge on all European game from fox, roe deer and chamois upwards to the big European game like red deer and moose. These people realized that bullets with different characteristics can be utilized to produce varying effects on game. As with all 6.5 mm cartridges, the big game hunting bullets used in the 6.5×68mm have comparatively high sectional densities for good penetration on suitable size game animals.

== The 6.5×68mm as parent case ==
Cartridges that are not officially registered with nor sanctioned by C.I.P. (Commission Internationale Permanente Pour L'Epreuve Des Armes A Feu Portative) or its American equivalent, SAAMI (Sporting Arms and Ammunition Manufacturers’ Institute) are generally known as wildcats. By blowing out standard factory cases the wildcatter generally hopes to gain extra muzzle velocity by increasing the case capacity of the factory parent cartridge case by a few percent. Practically there can be some muzzle velocity gained by this method, but the measured results between parent cartridges and their 'improved' wildcat offspring is often marginal. Besides changing the shape and internal volume of the parent cartridge case, wildcatters also can change the original caliber. A reason to change the original caliber can be to comply with a minimal permitted caliber or bullet weight for the legal hunting of certain species of game.

Wildcats are not governed by C.I.P. or SAAMI rules so wildcatters can capitalize the achievable high operating pressures. It is often reported that modern 68 mm RWS brass can tolerate up to 500 MPa (72519 psi) piezo pressure. Because the 6.5×68mm offers an exceptional sturdy, pressure resistant cartridge case that can relatively easily be reloaded with primers, powder and bullets and hence be reused several times it has become quite popular amongst wildcatters. With the German 68 mm magnum cartridge case as parent case wildcatters have created .25×68, .270×68, 7×68mm, .30×68, .338×68, .375×68 or .416×68 variants.

== See also ==
- List of firearms
- List of rifle cartridges
- Table of handgun and rifle cartridges
- 6 mm caliber
