= Lazzeroni =

Lazzeroni Arms Company
- Industry: Firearms
- Founder: John Lazzeroni
- Headquarters: Tucson, United States
- Website: https://www.lazzeroni.com/

Lazzeroni Arms Company is a US firearms and firearm cartridge maker based in Tucson, Arizona. Lazzeroni was founded by John Lazzeroni and is known for designing and producing long range hunting rifles and high speed cartridges.

== Lazzeroni rifles ==
Initially Lazzeroni rifles were made using Remington Model 700 actions, but due to feeding problems and concerns about the action's strength, the company subsequently used a specially modified McBros action with a custom magazine assembly. More recently, the company has used specially made SAKO actions.

Lazzeroni's standard rifle, the L2000ST, has a 27 in (69 cm) barrel and weighs 8 lb (3.6 kg) without a scope. The company's lightweight mountain rifle, the L2000SA, has a 24 in (61 cm) barrel and weighs 6.5 lb (2.9 kg) without a scope.

== Lazzeroni proprietary cartridges ==
Lazzeroni has developed a series of proprietary short and long, unbelted magnum cartridges. Lazzeroni proprietary cartridges include:

- 6.17mm Spitfire
- 6.17mm Flash
- 6.53mm Scramjet
- 6.71mm Phantom
- 6.71mm Blackbird
- 7.21mm Tomahawk
- 7.21mm Firebird
- 7.21mm Firehawk
- 7.82mm Patriot
- 7.82mm Warbird
- 8.59mm Galaxy
- 8.59mm Titan
- 9.09mm Eagle
- 9.53mm Hellcat
- 9.53mm Saturn
- 10.57mm Maverick
- 10.57mm Meteor
- 12.04mm Bibamufu
