= 7mm Shooting Times Westerner =

Wildcat rifle cartridge

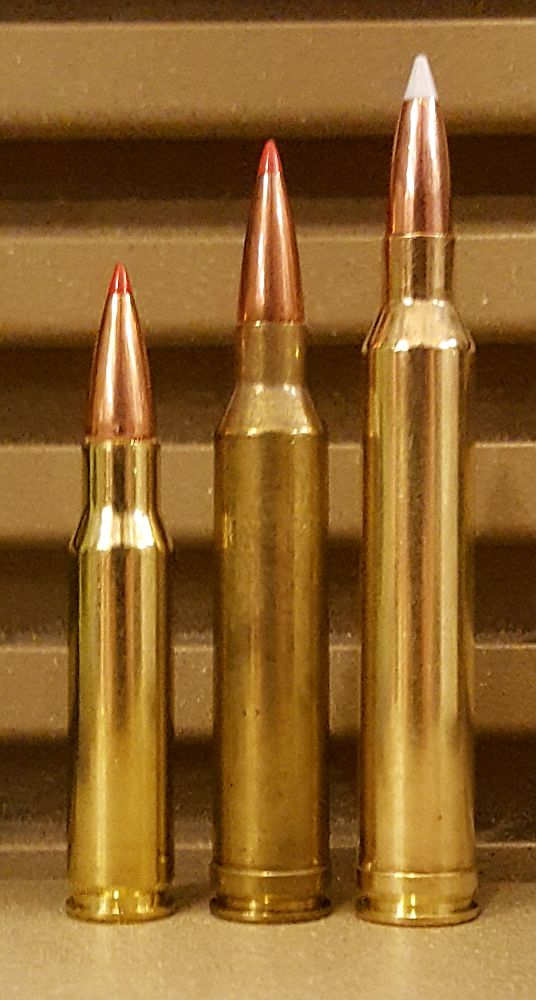
- Left to right: .308 Winchester, 7mm Remington Magnum and 7mm Shooting Times Westerner
- Type: Rifle
- Place of origin: United States

Production history
- Designer: Layne Simpson
- Designed: 1979
- Produced: 1989-Present

Specifications
- Parent case: 8mm Remington Magnum
- Case type: Belted, bottleneck
- Bullet diameter: .284 in (7.2 mm)
- Neck diameter: .315 in (8.0 mm)
- Shoulder diameter: .4868 in (12.36 mm)
- Base diameter: .5126 in (13.02 mm)
- Rim diameter: .532 in (13.5 mm)
- Rim thickness: .220 in (5.6 mm)
- Case length: 2.850 in (72.4 mm)
- Overall length: 3.60 in (91 mm)
- Case capacity: 93.3 gr of H2O
- Rifling twist: 1 in 9 in (229 mm)
- Primer type: Large rifle magnum
- Maximum pressure (SAAMI): 65,000 psi (450 MPa)

Ballistic performance
Bullet mass/type	Velocity	Energy
120 gr (8 g) X	3,384 ft/s (1,031 m/s)	3,052 ft⋅lbf (4,138 J)
140 gr (9 g) X	3,268 ft/s (996 m/s)	3,321 ft⋅lbf (4,503 J)
150 gr (10 g) BT	3,233 ft/s (985 m/s)	3,482 ft⋅lbf (4,721 J)
160 gr (10 g) Partition	3,177 ft/s (968 m/s)	3,587 ft⋅lbf (4,863 J)
175 gr (11 g) PSPCL	3,047 ft/s (929 m/s)	3,609 ft⋅lbf (4,893 J)
- Test barrel length: 26"; Source: Accurate Powder

The 7mm Shooting Times Westerner, sometimes referred to as the 7mm STW, began as a wildcat rifle cartridge developed by Layne Simpson, Field Editor of Shooting Times, in 1979. It is an 8mm Remington Magnum case that has been "necked down" (narrowing the case opening) by 1 mm to accept 7 mm (.284 in) bullets.

== Background ==
The first major company to produce the 7mm STW was A-Square in 1994. The 7mm STW graduated to commercial status when it was officially recognized by SAAMI in 1996, and the Remington Arms Company started to produce it in 1997, with other ammunition manufacturers following. As of 2019, Federal Premium Ammunition is the only major manufacturer to still offer it on a regular basis, but smaller manufacturers also provide loaded ammunition.

== See also ==
- 7mm caliber for other cartridges of this caliber.
- Table of handgun and rifle cartridges
