= .375 H&H Magnum =

British rifle cartridge

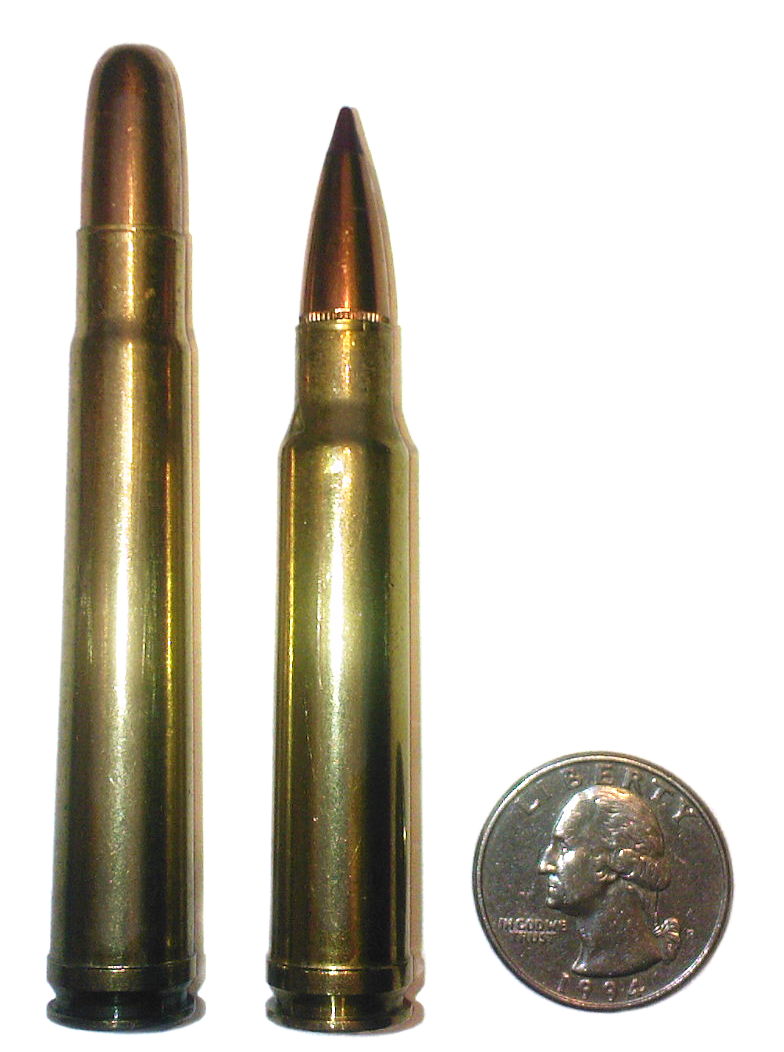
- .375 H&H Magnum (left) with .338 Winchester Magnum (right) and US quarter for scale
- Type: Rifle
- Place of origin: United Kingdom

Production history
- Designer: Holland & Holland
- Designed: 1912
- Produced: 1912–present
- Variants: .375 Flanged Magnum.375 H&H Ackley Improved.375 Weatherby Magnum

Specifications
- Parent case: Unique
- Case type: Belted, bottleneck
- Bullet diameter: .375 in (9.5 mm)
- Land diameter: .365 in (9.3 mm)
- Neck diameter: .402 in (10.2 mm)
- Shoulder diameter: .448 in (11.4 mm)
- Base diameter: .513 in (13.0 mm)
- Rim diameter: .532 in (13.5 mm)
- Rim thickness: .050 in (1.3 mm)
- Case length: 2.850 in (72.4 mm)
- Overall length: 3.600 in (91.4 mm)
- Case capacity: 95.0 gr H_{2}O (6.16 cm^{3})
- Rifling twist: 1 in 12 in (300 mm)
- Primer type: Large rifle magnum
- Maximum pressure: 62,000 psi (430 MPa)

Ballistic performance
Bullet mass/type	Velocity	Energy
270 gr (17 g) Barnes TSX	2,625 ft/s (800 m/s)	4,132 ft⋅lbf (5,602 J)
300 gr (19 g) Norma Oryx	2,559 ft/s (780 m/s)	4,363 ft⋅lbf (5,915 J)
300 gr (19 g) Swift A-Frame	2,559 ft/s (780 m/s)	4,363 ft⋅lbf (5,915 J)
350 gr (23 g) Woodleigh FMJ	2,300 ft/s (700 m/s)	4,112 ft⋅lbf (5,575 J)
350 gr (23 g) Woodleigh Soft Nose	2,300 ft/s (700 m/s)	4,112 ft⋅lbf (5,575 J)
- Test barrel length: 24 inches (610 mm); Source: Norma

The .375 Holland & Holland Magnum, often abbreviated to .375 H&H Magnum, is a medium-bore rifle cartridge introduced in 1912 by London based gunmaker Holland & Holland. The .375 H&H cartridge featured a belt to ensure the correct headspace, which otherwise might be unreliable, given the narrow shoulder of the cartridge case. The cartridge was designed to use cordite which was made in long strands – hence the tapered shape of the case, which, as a beneficial side effect also helped in smooth chambering and extraction from a rifle's breech.

The .375 H&H often is cited as one of the most useful all-round rifle cartridges, especially in shooting large and dangerous game. With bullet weights ranging from 235 grains (17 g) to 350 grains (23 g), it has the necessary punch for small to medium game, as well as large, thick-skinned dangerous game. The most common bullet weight available in this caliber is 300 grains (19 g). In many regions with thick-skinned dangerous game animals, the .375 H&H is seen as the minimum acceptable caliber, and in many places (primarily in Africa) it is now the legal minimum for hunting such game. African game guides, professional hunters, and dangerous game cullers have repeatedly voted the .375 H&H as their clear preference for an all-round caliber if they could have only one rifle. Alaskan game guides have expressed a similar preference for brown bear and polar bear country.

Unlike many other chamberings, .375 H&H Magnum rifles achieve nearly the same point of impact over a wide range of bullet weights at all commonly used distances. This simplifies a hunter's choice in selecting different bullet weights, based upon the game hunted, by requiring fewer scope or sight adjustments, which further serves to popularize the .375 H&H Magnum among professional hunters.

== History and origins ==
The .375 H&H Magnum is the result of competition between British rifle manufacturers to develop new cartridges to take advantage of the new smokeless powders. The 9.5×57mm Mannlicher–Schönauer cartridge had a major influence on British rifle manufacturers and was soon adopted by Westley Richards and Eley as the .375 Rimless Nitro Express 2.25". In an effort to compete, Holland & Holland introduced the .400/375 Belted Nitro Express.

.400/375 Belted Nitro Express was developed in 1905 and the 9.5×57mm MS – just in 1908.

The .400/375 H&H (also known as the .375 Velopex) as it is sometimes known was the first cartridge manufactured to feature a belt. The addition of a belt to a rimless cartridge design provided the advantage of allowing for correct headspacing of highly tapered cartridges (an advantage of flanged cartridges) and smooth feeding through magazine rifles (the advantage of rimless cartridges).

The introduction of the 9.3×62mm Mauser cartridge in 1905 had a profound and lasting influence on hunters in Africa. Compared to the British double rifles, the Mauser was a far less expensive rifle to manufacture and therefore cheaper to acquire. The double rifles gained little from industrialization whereas the Mauser rifles had gained from mass production due to contracts to produce military rifles for many countries. The result was cheap magazine rifles capable of firing one of the very best candidates for the all round hunting cartridge in Africa. The influence of Mauser's 98 action should not be understated; British gunmakers such as Rigby were purchasing the Mauser 98 actions for use in their own rifles with their own cartridges. The popularity of the 9.3×62mm Mauser was such that everyone from the German farmers in Africa to the white hunters from Europe discarded their previous doubles and less powerful magazine rifles and took to the 9.3×62mm. The 9.3×62mm demonstrated that it was adequate for everything from the dik-dik to the elephant and had acquired a reputation to match.

This trend did not go unnoticed by British rifle manufacturers. Between 1909 and 1911 Holland & Holland, Jeffery, Rigby, and Westley Richards introduced their own cartridges: .375 H&H Magnum, .404 Jeffery, .416 Rigby, and the .425 Westley Richards in an effort to stem the tide of the 9.3×62mm.

Holland & Holland decided that the rifle had to fire a bullet with an adequate sectional density as the 286 gr (18.5 g) bullet of the 9.3×62mm Mauser cartridge which had demonstrated that it had the required penetration on thick skinned dangerous game. Secondly, the cartridge would require a high velocity so as to provide this penetration at extended ranges. Thirdly, the cartridge must function reliably through a magazine rifle in tropical conditions and this required a tapered case working at lower pressures. Holland & Holland had determined that to provide adequate penetration a bullet with the sectional density similar to the 9.3×62mm required impact velocities of about 2,150 ft/s (660 m/s). Drawing from anecdotal evidence of hunters it was also determined that high velocities provided impressive kills on game. Another added advantage of the high velocities was that a range misjudgment would be mitigated by the flatter trajectory of a HV projectile.

Holland & Holland's new cartridge was named .375 Holland and Holland Magnum, and was released together with a flanged or rimmed version (.375 Flanged Magnum also known as the .375 Nitro Express). It featured the belt from the .400/375 H&H cartridge, fired a 300 gr (19 g) bullet which had the same sectional density of the 286 gr (18.5 g) 9.3×62mm bullet at a velocity of 2,500 ft/s (760 m/s). The cartridge burned cordite and had a rather low working pressure of 47,000 psi (3,200 bar) by modern standards so that spent cases would extract reliably in the tropical environments of India and Africa.

Original cordite loads were as follows:

- 62 grains for the 235-gr bullet, yielding a listed 2,800 feet per second
- 61 grains for the 270-gr bullet, yielding a listed 2,650 feet per second
- 58 grains for the 300-gr bullet, yielding a listed 2,500 feet per second

The new cartridge was a proprietary design unlike the 9.3×62mm and was considerably longer than its German counterpart. While many .375 H&H rifles were built on the longer magnum Mauser actions, these actions were considerably more expensive and rarer than the standard actions. Standard actions could be used but required modifications to allow for flawless feeding and cycling of the .375 H&H Magnum cartridge. So while the .375 H&H provided considerable advantages over the 9.3×62mm, the significantly greater cost of the H&H rifles presented a roadblock to the adoption of the .375 H&H over the 9.3×62mm cartridge and remained for a time a less attractive option.

At the end of World War I, Holland & Holland released the cartridge to the public for general trade. Also, new markets opened in America as more hunters sought to hunt in Africa. The .375 H&H was seen by many as the best medium bore dangerous game cartridge available for African safari hunting and which could be easily put to use for hunting large game in North America. Winchester was the first US gunmaker to produce rifles chambered for the cartridge and did so beginning in 1925.

The end of World War II saw many gun makers turning to the civilian shooting market when war time contracts began running out. FN, Mauser, Remington and Winchester began turning out quality bolt-action rifles and with increasing number of sportsmen taking to Africa saw the .375 H&H increasing in popularity. A further boost in popularity came when African colonies enacted legislation stipulating that the 9.30 mm (0.366 in) or the .375 in (9.5 mm) be the minimum bullet diameter for dangerous game. The legislating away of sub minimum cartridges forced the users of these cartridges to pick up a cartridge which qualified for the shooting of these game species and the logical choice was to move up to the .375 H&H Magnum.

== Design & specifications ==
The .375 H&H Magnum case design was conceived to use cordite; a stick type propellant used widely in the United Kingdom. The tapering cartridge body design and the small shallow shoulder are typical aspects of cartridges optimized for the use of this propellant. An advantage of such a case design is that it will feed and extract smoothly thus contributing to the cartridge's reliability in the field.

Unlike previous cartridges, the .375 H&H operates at relatively higher pressures and was designed from the outset for use with smokeless powders that can generate higher pressures and thus higher velocities. However, when the cartridge was designed pressure levels were held to 47,000 psi (320 MPa) as cordite was sensitive to temperature and could cause dangerously high pressures in the hot tropical climates of Africa and India. However, modern smokeless powders are not as sensitive to ambient temperatures as cordite and therefore both the C.I.P. and SAAMI provide far higher allowable pressures than the original loading of the cartridge allowed.

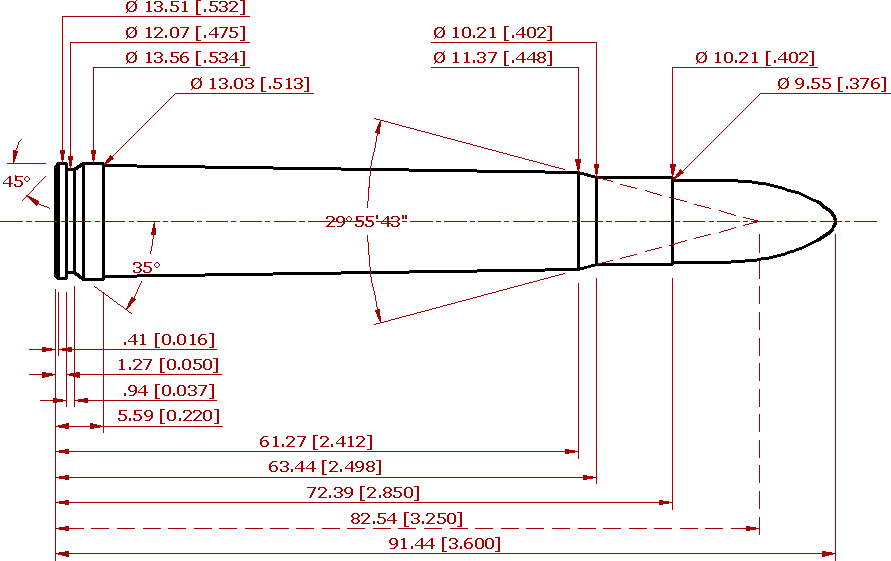

C.I.P. recommends that commencement of rifling begin at 8.91 mm (0.351 in). Bore diameter is given as 9.30 mm (0.366 in) and groove diameter is 9.55 mm (0.376 in). C.I.P. recommends a six groove barrel contour with each groove having an arc length of 2.92 mm (0.115 in) and a twist rate of one rotation in 305 mm (12.0 in). Maximum chamber pressure is given at 62,366 psi (430.00 MPa). There are no discrepancies between SAAMI and C.I.P. values. However, C.I.P. measures angle α (shoulder angle) as 29°55'43". SAAMI measure the shoulder angle as α/2 which is given by SAAMI to be 15°.

== Performance ==
When the .375 H&H Magnum was released in 1912 it was loaded with three bullet weights: a 235 gr (15.2 g) at 2,800 ft/s (850 m/s), 270 gr (17 g) at 2,650 ft/s (810 m/s)and a 300 gr (19 g) at 2,500 ft/s (760 m/s). However, today, with the availability of a wide range of powders, velocities gains of 150–200 ft/s (46–61 m/s) can be realized. Acceptable bullet weights for the .375 H&H Magnum range from 200 gr (13 g) to 380 gr (25 g). The lighter bullets, those weighing 210 gr (14 g) to 235 gr (15.2 g) are suitable for lighter plains game. Bullets weighing between 250 gr (16 g) to 285 gr (18.5 g) can be used on heavy bodied plains game. Bullets weighing 285 gr (18.5 g) to 300 gr (19 g) should be reserved for heavy dangerous game.

Today, a typical factory load such as Remington's R375M1 or Federal's ammunition will launch a 270 gr (17 g) spitzer bullet at 2,690 feet per second (820 m/s) with 4,337 ft⋅lbf (5,880 J) of energy at the muzzle. This load has approximately the same trajectory as the 180-grain (12 g) bullet from a .30-06 Springfield. However while the .30-06 generates only about 2,914 ft⋅lbf (3,951 J) compared with the .375 H&H. The 270 gr (17 g) spitzer bullet at .375 H&H velocities has a Maximum point-blank range (MPBR) of about 260 yd (240 m) when sighted in at about 220 yd (200 m).

The typical 300 gr (19 g) ammunition manufactured by Federal and Remington have a muzzle velocity of 2,530 feet per second (770 m/s) churning out 4,263 ft⋅lbf (5,780 J) of energy. The 300 gr (19 g) ammunition has a bullet trajectory similar to that of the .308 Winchester firing a 180 gr (12 g) bullet. The trajectory allows for a MPBR of about 245 yd (224 m) when zeroed in for 210 yd (190 m).

Hornady new Superformance line of cartridges provides a leap in performance to the .375 H&H cartridge. The Superformance line uses powders specifically blended for each cartridge. Hornady's 375 H&H 270 gr SP-RP Superformance ammunition fires a 270 gr (17 g) bullet at 2,800 ft/s (850 m/s) for while the 375 H&H 300 gr DGS Superformance fires a 300 gr (19 g) bullet at 2,670 ft/s (810 m/s) generating 4,699 ft⋅lbf (6,371 J) and 4,748 ft⋅lbf (6,437 J) of energy respectively.

The 9.3×64mm Brenneke cartridge is the closest European continental ballistic twin of the .375 Holland & Holland Magnum. When compared to the .375 Holland & Holland Magnum the 9.3×64mm Brenneke uses a bullet of a slightly smaller diameter of .366 in (9.3 mm) versus the .375 H&H which uses a .375 in (9.5 mm) bullet a difference of only .009 in (0.23 mm).

== Sporting usage ==
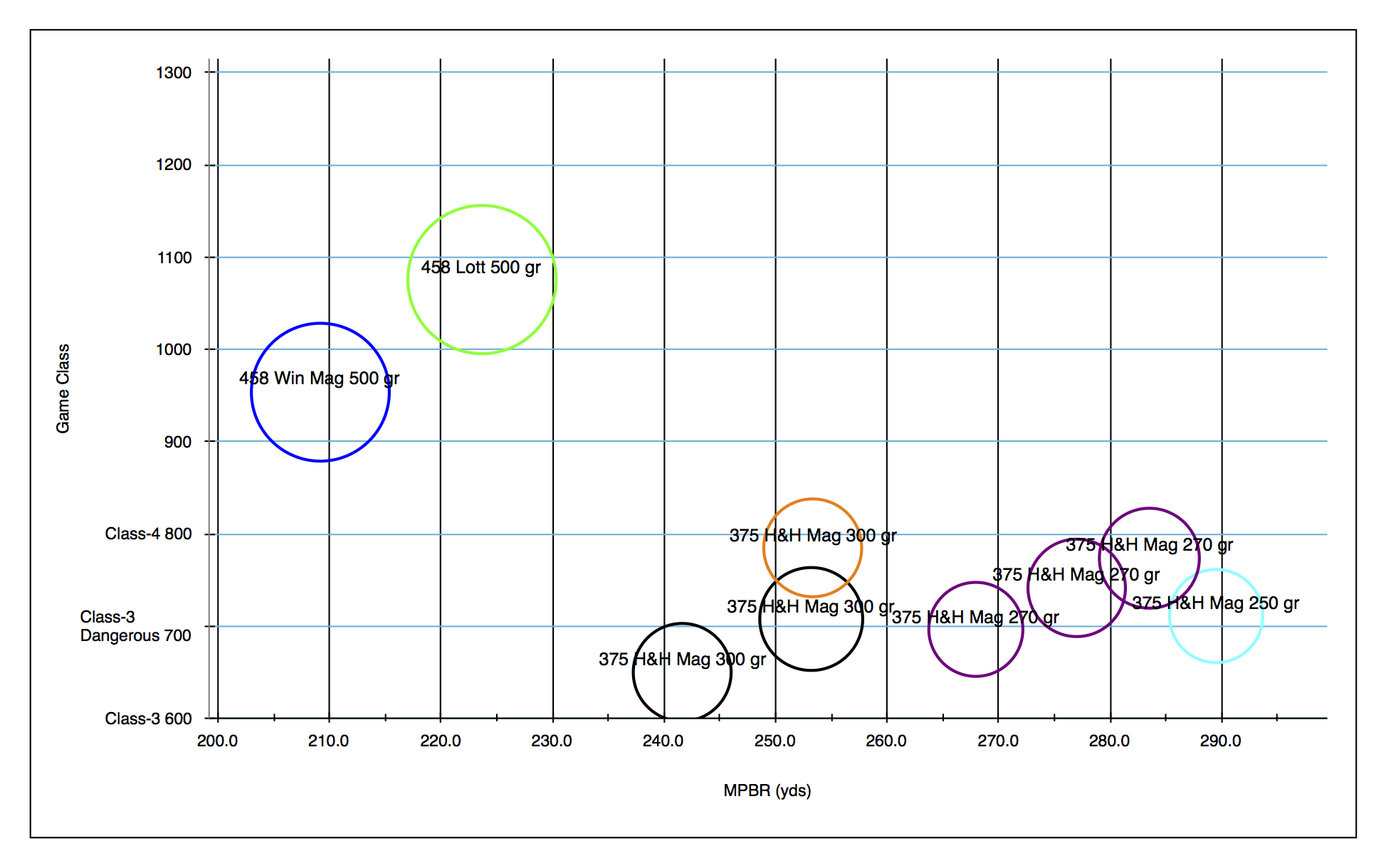
Game Class vs 6 inch Maximum Point Blank Range of some 375 Magnum cartridges

The .375 H&H Magnum is a versatile cartridge and is referred to by Jack O’Connor as the "Queen of the Medium Bores". The cartridge is very popular in Africa; in part because it is capable of killing large species including all Big Five game animals. The big game hunter, John "Pondoro" Taylor, held the .375 H&H Magnum in such high esteem that he dedicated a chapter to it in the book African Rifles and Cartridges.

Ammunition loaded with the 300 gr (19 g) or heavier bullet on the .375 H&H is adequate for heavy thick-skinned dangerous game such as elephant and rhinoceros in most conditions. Today, due to the pace at which hunting is conducted and the requirement of success within certain time constraints, the .375 H&H Magnum is considered under powered for class 4 game like elephant, rhinoceros and buffalo as the only shooting situation that might present itself might be an adverse one. However, there is little doubt that it has been successfully used to take these heavy dangerous game species. There is some speculation that the .375 H&H Magnum has been used to take more Big Five game than any other cartridge. Even today, many professional hunters, outfitters and wildlife management personnel in Africa continue to rely on the .375 H&H Magnum to carry out their duties throughout the continent.

Apart from hunting class 3 game, the .375 Holland & Holland Magnum is often used for last resort defense against dangerous class 3 game, particularly the great bears including grizzly, polar and brown bears. It is often carried by fishermen, hunters and guides in Alaska, Canada and European arctic regions like Greenland for protection as encounters with these larger bear species can be common.

Bullets weighing 325–350 gr (21.1–22.7 g) will have sectional densities between .330 and .356. These bullets can be launched at velocities between 2,380–2,470 ft/s (730–750 m/s) giving these bullets greater penetration than a 500 gr (32 g) .458 bullet at 2,240 ft/s (680 m/s).

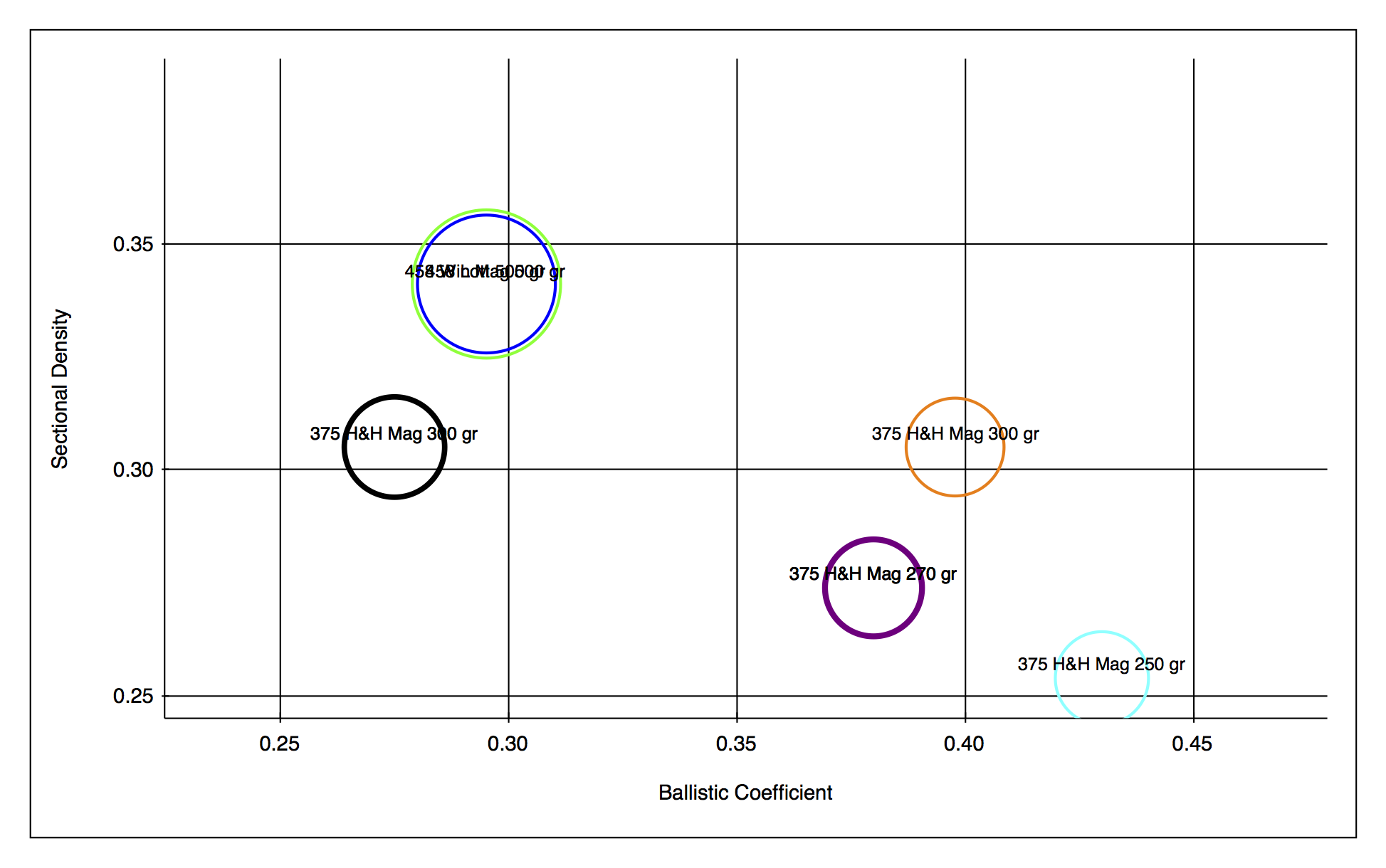
Sectional Density vs Ballistic Coefficient of some 375 Magnum cartridges

Bullets weighing 250–270 gr (16–17 g) are perfect for the largest cats such as the lion or tiger and other dangerous class 3 game. While these felines do not require extremely powerful cartridges, (a .300 Winchester Magnum can be considered a minimum for these cats), local requirements or regulations may require a larger cartridge than the .375 H&H Magnum. This range of bullets also is a great choice for most plains game species in Africa and for elk, red deer, and moose (called elk in Europe) in North America and Europe.

There are a great number of rifles (and even a few handguns, such as adapted Howdah pistols) chambered for the .375 H&H. Many types of actions are used, including single-shot rifles, double-rifles, and bolt-action rifles. When hunting dangerous game, a double-rifle or a controlled-feed bolt-action rifle is most commonly recommended, as a quick follow-up shot may be necessary, and reliability of the firearm becomes of paramount importance.

The one sport in which the .375 H&H Magnum has made some gains in has been the Big Bore Shoots such as those sponsored by the Big Bore Association of South Africa and its affiliated chapters. The .375 H&H Magnum is considered a transitional bore by the association and the minimum cartridge which is allowable for score keeping.

== Variants ==
The .375 H&H Magnum's long tapering body and shallow shoulders are generally believed not to promote long case life due to case head separation above the belt. The case design does not promote the optimal use of the cartridge size to gain performance. Modern cartridges have very little taper so as to benefit from a larger powder capacity. There have been a few attempts to improve the performance of the cartridge.

=== .375 Flanged Magnum ===
The .375 Flanged Magnum (9.5×75mmR), also known as the .375 H&H Flanged Magnum is the companion cartridge to the .375 H&H Magnum for use in double rifles and was released together with the .375 H&H Magnum by Holland & Holland. It is a rimmed (flanged) cartridge and is loaded to a lower pressure level of 47,000 psi (320 MPa).

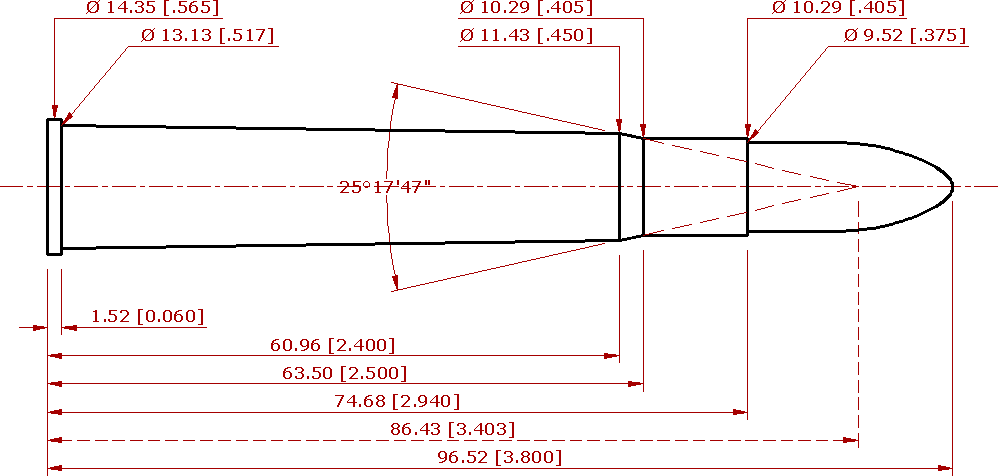

The CIP has published mandatory specifications for the .375 Flanged Magnum. Bore ∅ for the cartridge is 9.30 mm (0.366 in) and the groove ∅ is 9.55 mm (0.376 in). The barrel will have six grooves with a twist of one revolution in 305 mm (12.0 in) and each groove being 2.92 mm (0.115 in)wide. SAAMI has not published specifications nor recommendations in regard to this cartridge.

The cartridge is capable of firing a 235 gr (15.2 g) bullet at 2,800 ft/s (850 m/s), a 270 gr (17 g) bullet at 2,650 ft/s (810 m/s) and a 300 gr (19 g) bullet at 2,500 ft/s (760 m/s) with muzzle energies of 4,090 ft⋅lbf (5,550 J),4,200 ft⋅lbf (5,700 J) and 4,160 ft⋅lbf (5,640 J) respectively. The cartridge is appropriate for the same game species as the .375 H&H Magnum cartridge.

=== .375 H&H Ackley Improved ===
The .375 H&H Ackley Improved was a cartridge designed by P. O. Ackley in an effort improve on the performance and case life of the .375 H&H Magnum. The improved case follows the formulaic Ackley design of a body of little taper and steep shoulder of 40°. The cartridge was found to be capable of 2,830 ft/s (860 m/s) with a 270 gr (17 g) bullet. A .375 H&H Magnum cartridge can be chambered and fired safely in an Ackley Improved chamber but with a loss of performance, as some energy is lost fireforming the case to the chamber. A .375 H&H Magnum case thus fired will form to the Ackley Improved chamber.

=== .375 Weatherby Magnum ===
The .375 Weatherby Magnum is an improved case like the .375 H&H Ackley Improved. The case was designed by Roy Weatherby in 1944 and features the Weatherby double radius shoulder typical of all Weatherby cartridges. The .375 Weatherby Magnum is capable of launching a 300 gr (19 g) at 2,800 ft/s (850 m/s). The .375 H&H Magnum can be fired in the chamber of a .375 Weatherby Magnum with a slight loss in performance. Unlike the .375 H&H AI cartridge, the .375 Weatherby Magnum is loaded to higher pressures than its parent cartridge.

== As a parent cartridge ==
The distinctive belted case of this cartridge was patented in Britain on 31 March 1891 by G. Roth of Austria. The first commercial use of the patent was in 1907 for the .375 Holland-Schoenauer cartridge for a Mannlicher–Schoenauer bolt-action rifle marketed by Holland & Holland. The .375 H&H used an improved belted case shared with the .275 H&H Magnum when they were introduced together in August, 1912. This second belted case design was later used with the .300 H&H Magnum, and has been modified as the basis for "Magnum" cartridges developed by other arms manufacturers.

=== Cartridges based on the full length .375 H&H Magnum case ===
.244 H&H Magnum – based directly on the .375 H&H case
6.5-300 Weatherby Magnum – via the .300 Weatherby Magnum
7mm Shooting Times Westerner – via the 8mm Remington Magnum
.30 Super – a modified variant of the .300 H&H Magnum produced by Winchester
.300 H&H Magnum – based directly on the .375 H&H case
.300 Weatherby Magnum – via the full length .30 Super improved
8mm Remington Magnum – necked down improved .375 H&H case
.340 Weatherby Magnum – via the full length .30 Super improved
.350 Griffin & Howe Magnum – based directly on the .375 H&H case
.358 Shooting Times Alaskan – via the 8mm Remington Magnum
.375 Weatherby Magnum – via the .30 Super improved
.40 BSA Magnum
.400 H&H Magnum – based directly on the .375 H&H case
.416 Remington Magnum – via the 8mm Remington Magnum
.458 Lott – via the .458 Winchester Magnum
.470 Capstick – based directly on the .375 H&H case

=== Standard length cartridges based on the .375 H&H Magnum case ===
.257 Weatherby Magnum – via the .30 Super
.26 BSA Magnum
.264 Winchester Magnum – based directly on the .375 H&H case
.270 Weatherby Magnum – via the .30 Super
.275 H&H Magnum – developed along with the .375 in 1912
7×61mm S&H – via the .275 H&H Magnum
7mm Remington Magnum – based on the .375 H&H case via the .264 Winchester Magnum case
7mm Weatherby Magnum – via the .30 Super
.300 Winchester Magnum – based directly on the .375 H&H case
.308 Norma Magnum – used standard length Weatherby cases
.33 BSA Magnum
.338 Winchester Magnum – based directly on the .375 H&H case
.358 Norma Magnum – used standard length Weatherby cases
.458 Winchester Magnum – based directly on the .375 H&H case

=== Short action cartridges based on the .375 H&H Magnum case ===
6.5mm Remington Magnum – via the .350 Remington Magnum
.350 Remington Magnum – via the 7mm Remington Magnum
.450 Marlin – via the .458 Winchester Magnum

== See also ==
- List of rifle cartridges
- Table of handgun and rifle cartridges
- 9 mm caliber

== Sources ==
- Hodgdon Online Reloading Data
- Cartridge Dimensions
