= Scope mount =

Part for mounting a scope sight to a firearm

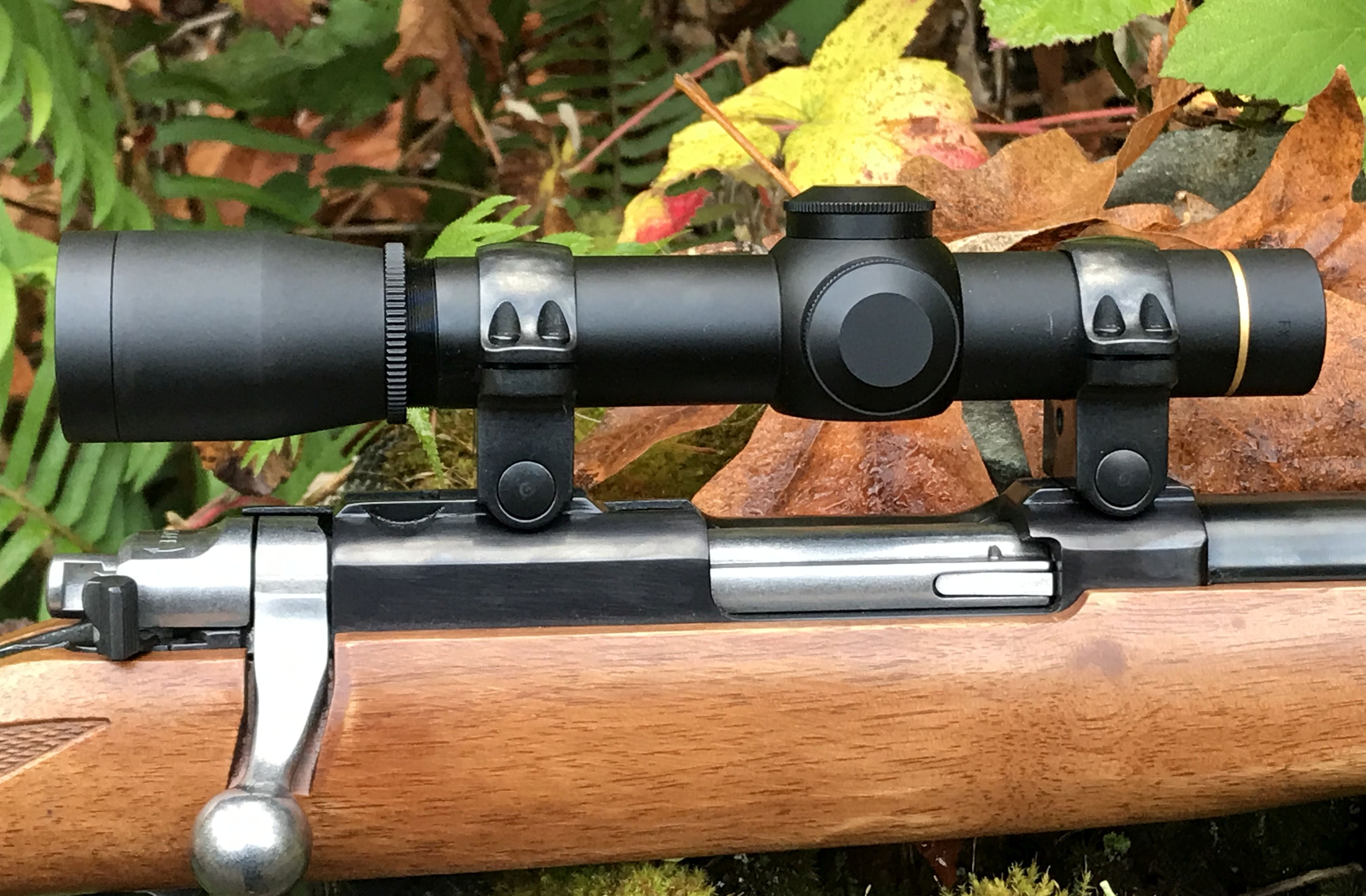
A Leupold telescopic sight mounted on a dovetailed rifle receiver via two scope rings

From left: A sketch of a cross section on a Zeiss rail and ring mount, both with a Picatinny rail interface.

Scope mounts are rigid implements used to attach (typically) a telescopic sight or other types of optical sights onto a firearm. The mount can be made integral to the scope body (such as the Zeiss rail) or, more commonly, an external fitting that clamp onto the scope tube via screw-tightened rings (similar to pipe shoes). The scope and mount are then fastened onto compatible interfaces on the weapon. Words such as mounts and bases are used somewhat loosely, and can refer to several different parts which are either used together or in place of each other as ways to mount optical sights to firearms.

Attachment interfaces for scope mounts vary according to weapon design and user choice. Traditionally scope mounts are fastened onto firearms via tapped screw holes (usually on the receiver) and/or clamps (onto the barrel or stock). Since the mid-20th century, dovetail rails, where the mount is slid over a straight dovetail bracket with an inverted isosceles trapezoid cross-section and fixed tight in position with clamping screws, became more common due to the ease of installation and removal. Later, the hexagonally cross-sectioned rail interface systems such as Weaver rail became popular and was later modified into the Picatinny rail in the early 1990s, which became the standardized military-use mounting interface for NATO troops in 1995. The Picatinny rail was officially replaced by the metrified NATO Accessory Rail for military use in 2009, although it remained popular in the civilian market for both scope and accessory mounting.

Scope mounts can be either one-piece (a single implement with multiple clamping rings) or multi-piece (usually two or more individual scope rings). These mounts are usually fastened with screws to specified tensions (which warrants the use of torque screwdrivers), but sometimes they are manually tightened via thumbscrews, and may even have Quick Release (QR) designs. As of 2020, the Picatinny rail is arguably the most widespread scope mounting standard for new firearms, although there are many proprietary and brand-specific types of mounts that can either be used with Picatinny rails, or as completely different design alternatives (see the section on Link between scope and firearm). Scope mounts may be offered by firearm and scope manufacturers, or bought as aftermarket accessories.

== Integral scope mounts ==
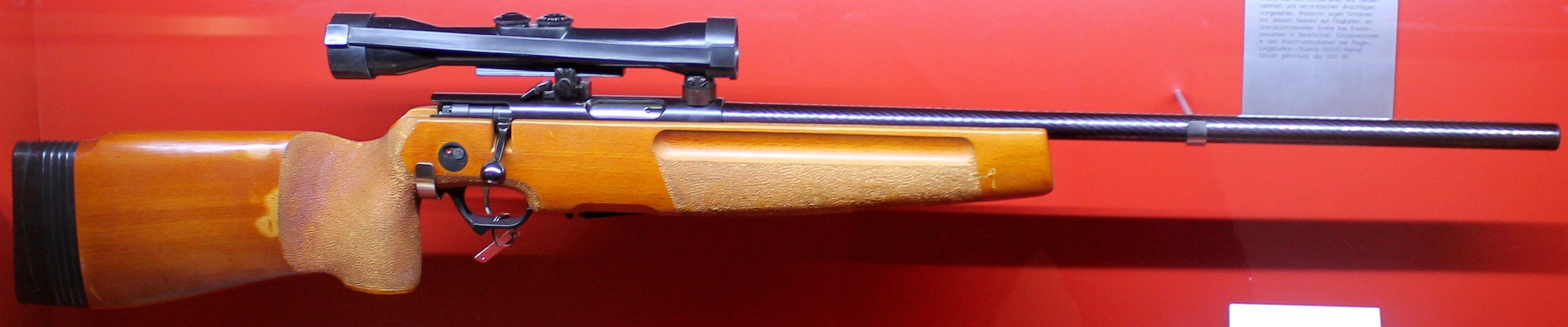
An East German SSG 82 fitted with a 4×32 Zeiss Jena sight, note the integral rail interface on the scope tube

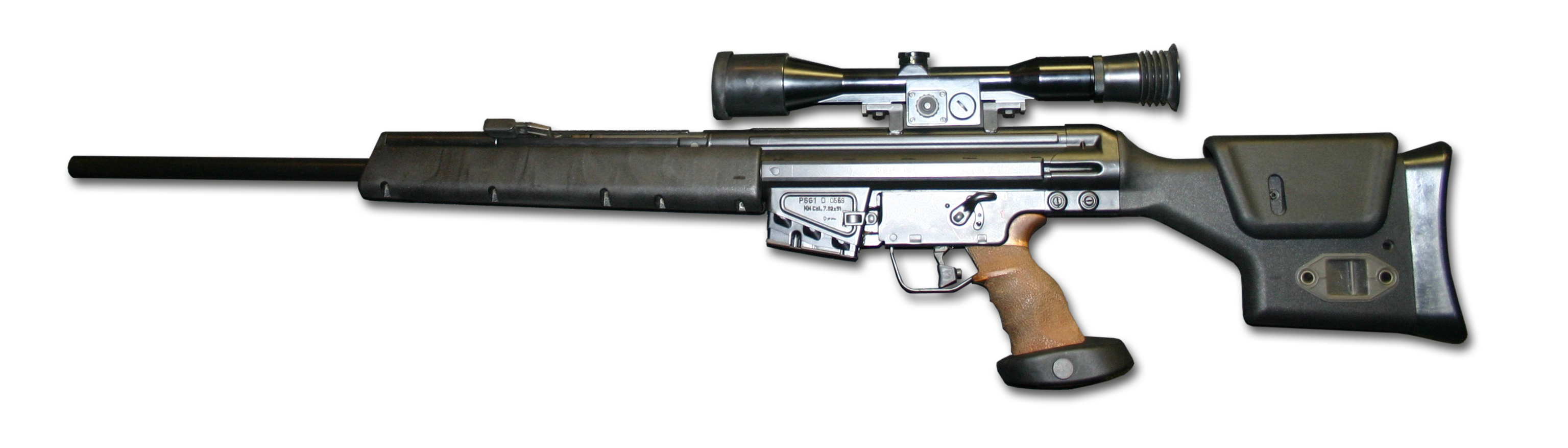
A scope with integral mount on a Heckler & Koch PSG1

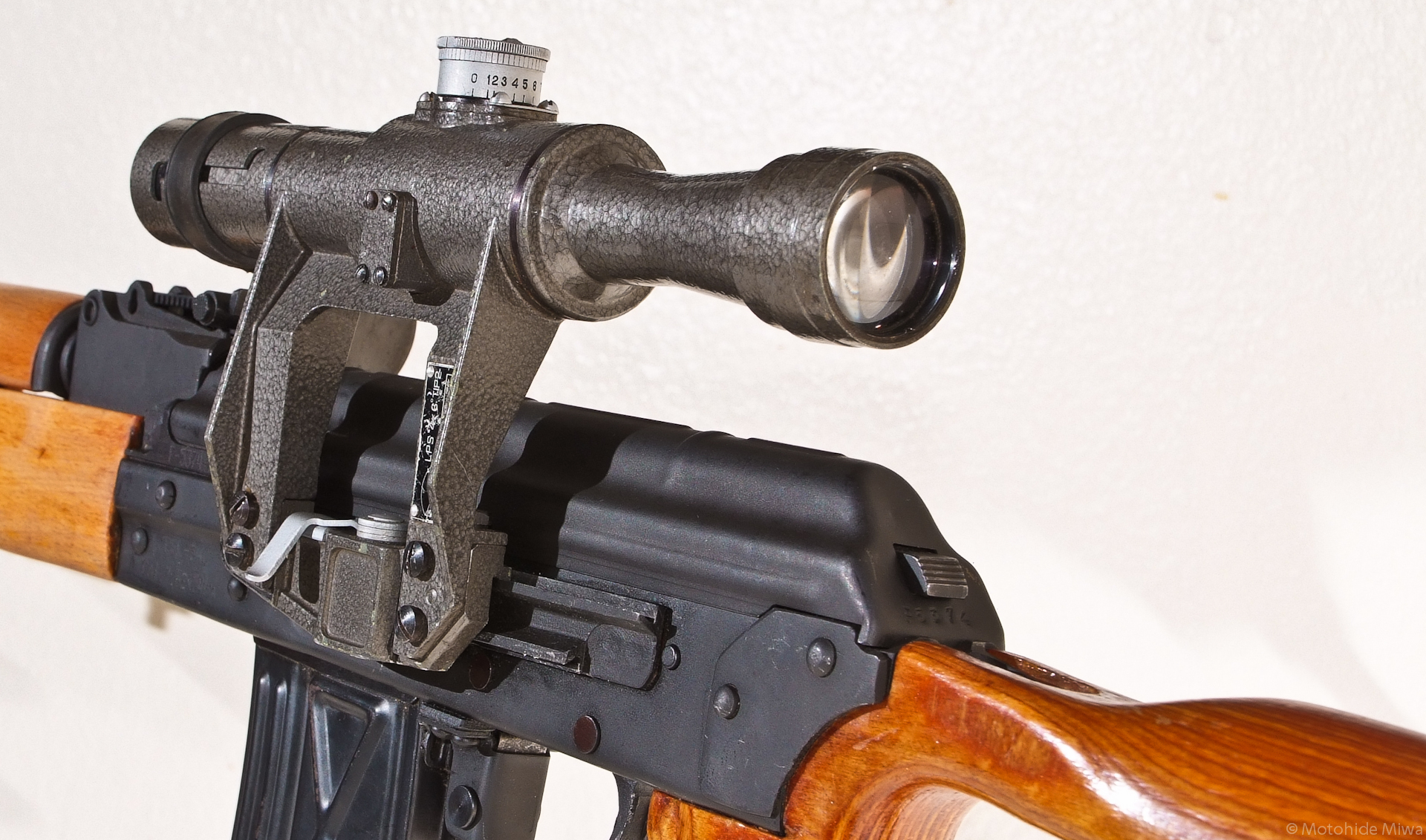
An LPS 4×6° TIP2 scope with integral side-mount on a Romanian PSL rifle

=== Zeiss rail ===
Among scopes for rail mounts, the 22.5-degree V-shaped Zeiss rail is the most prevalent standard. It was introduced in 1990. After the patent expired in 2008, compatible scopes have been offered from manufacturers such as Blaser, Leica, Minox, Meopta, Nikon, Noblex (formerly Docter), Schmidt & Bender and Steiner. It has therefore, in some sense, become the de facto industry standard for scope mounting rails. The system has so far seen most use on the European high end market.

=== Swarovski SR rail ===
The Swarovski SR rail (patented in 2002, introduced in 2005 The Swarovski SR rail is also used by Kahles, a Swarovski subsidiary.) has a flat rail with many "teeth" as recoil lugs, and is only offered on scopes from Swarovski and its subsidiary Kahles. It separates itself from the Zeiss rail in that it is not neither stepless nor self-centering.

=== S&B Convex rail ===
A former competing standard was the halv-circle shaped Schmidt & Bender Convex rail also introduced in 2005. Schmidt & Bender after a few years changed to the Zeiss rail standard. In contrast to the Zeiss and Swarovski systems, the S&B Convex rail had the possibility to add a cant to the scope when mounting, such that the reticle is not horizontal to the ground.

=== 70-degree prism rail ===
There is an older European system with an upside-down V-shape (70 degrees). This system has little widespread use today. The advantage of this system was that it at one time was offered by most European scope manufacturers, but the disadvantage was that the rail had to be drilled for a screw each time the eye relief was to be adjusted. All new standards for rail mounts have addressed this issue.

== Ring mounts ==
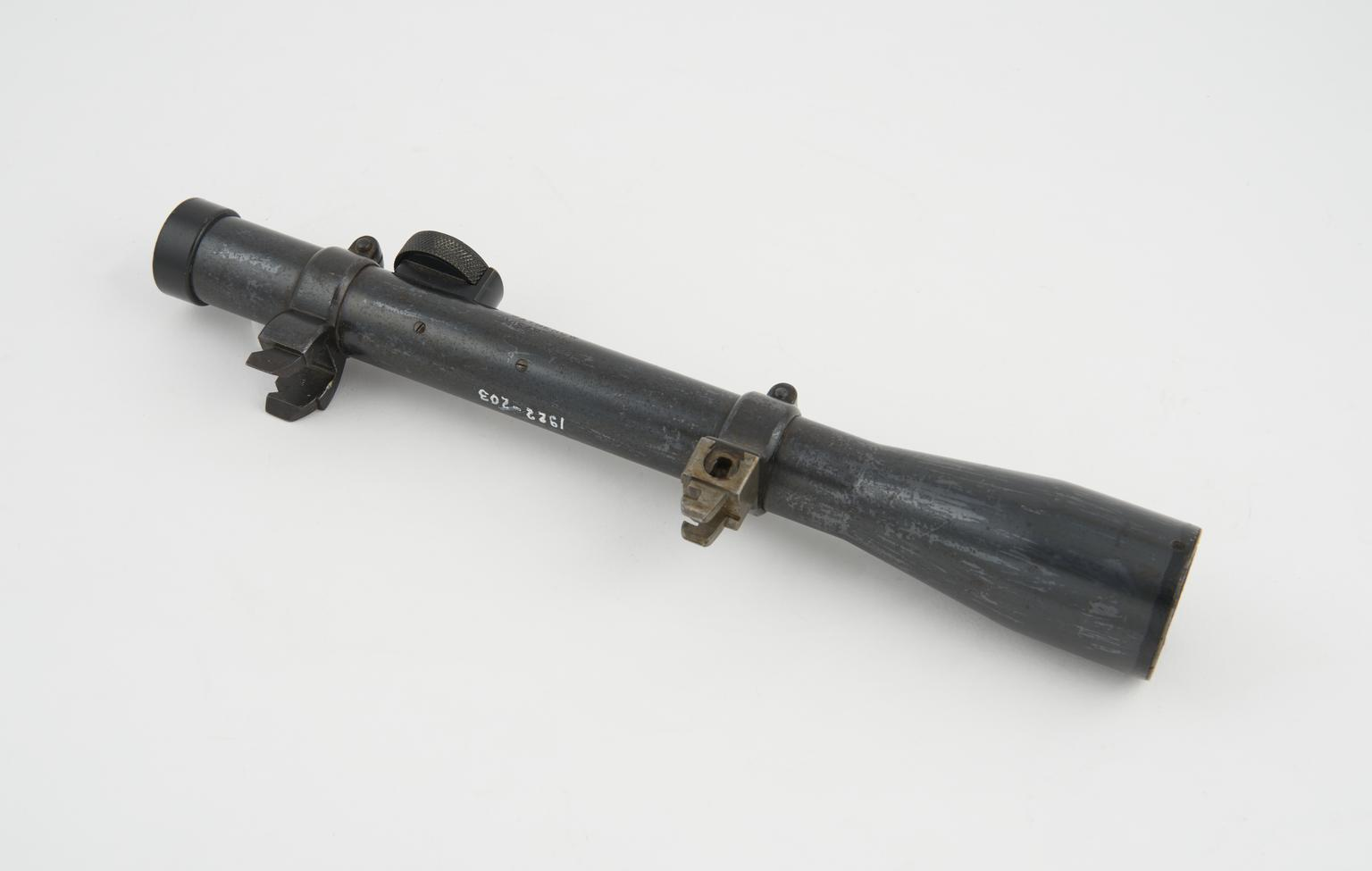
An old German machinegun telescopic sight with scope rings

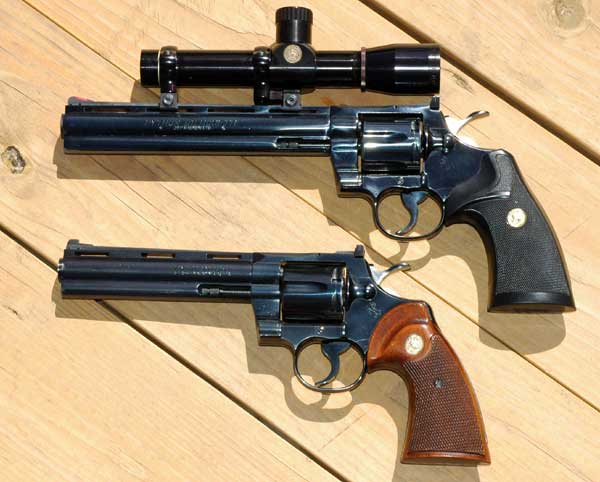
Two Colt Python revolvers, one (above) with barrel-mounted scope

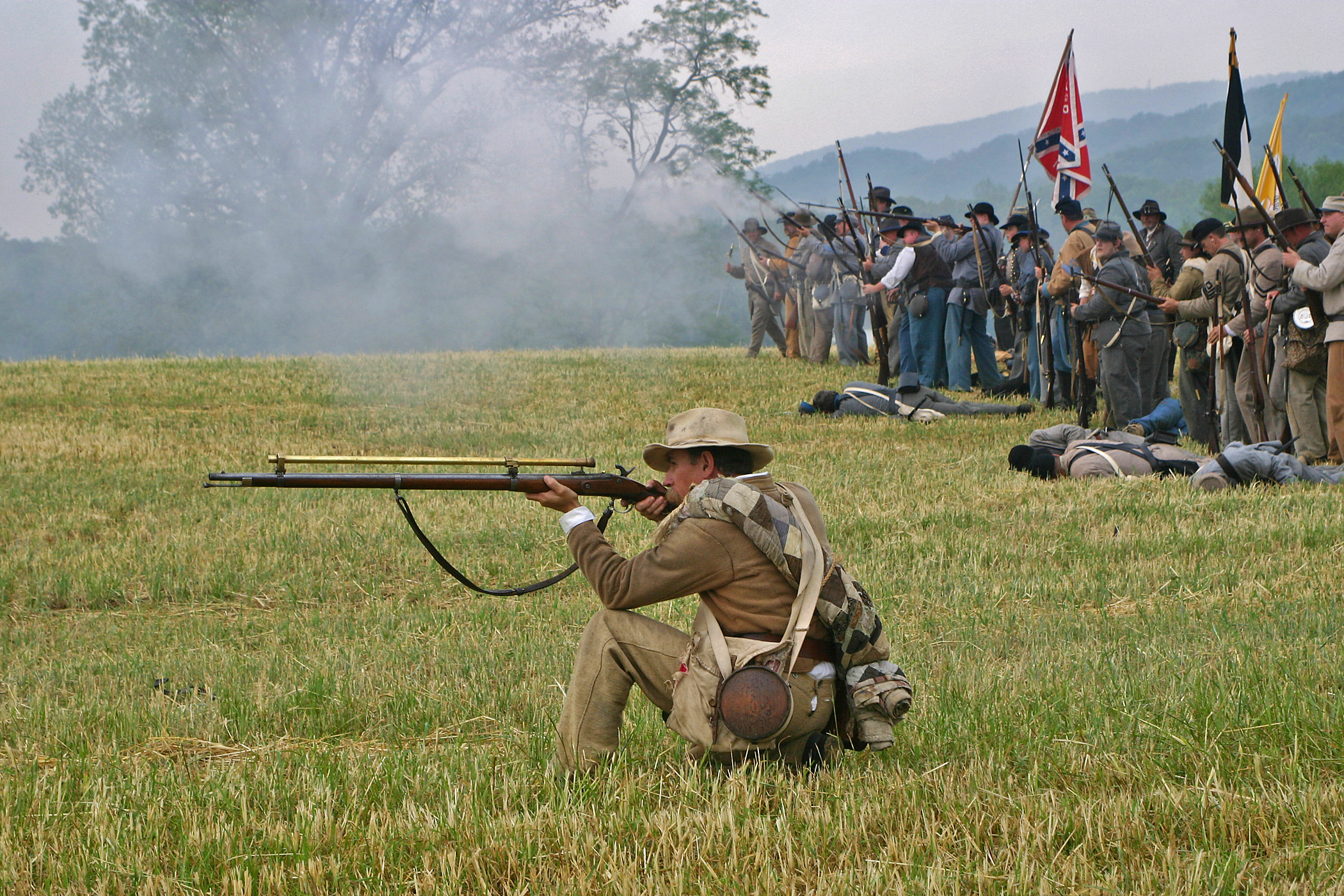
A re-enacted Confederate sharpshooter aiming a Whitworth rifle with a ring-mounted scope, secured by clamping onto the gunstock

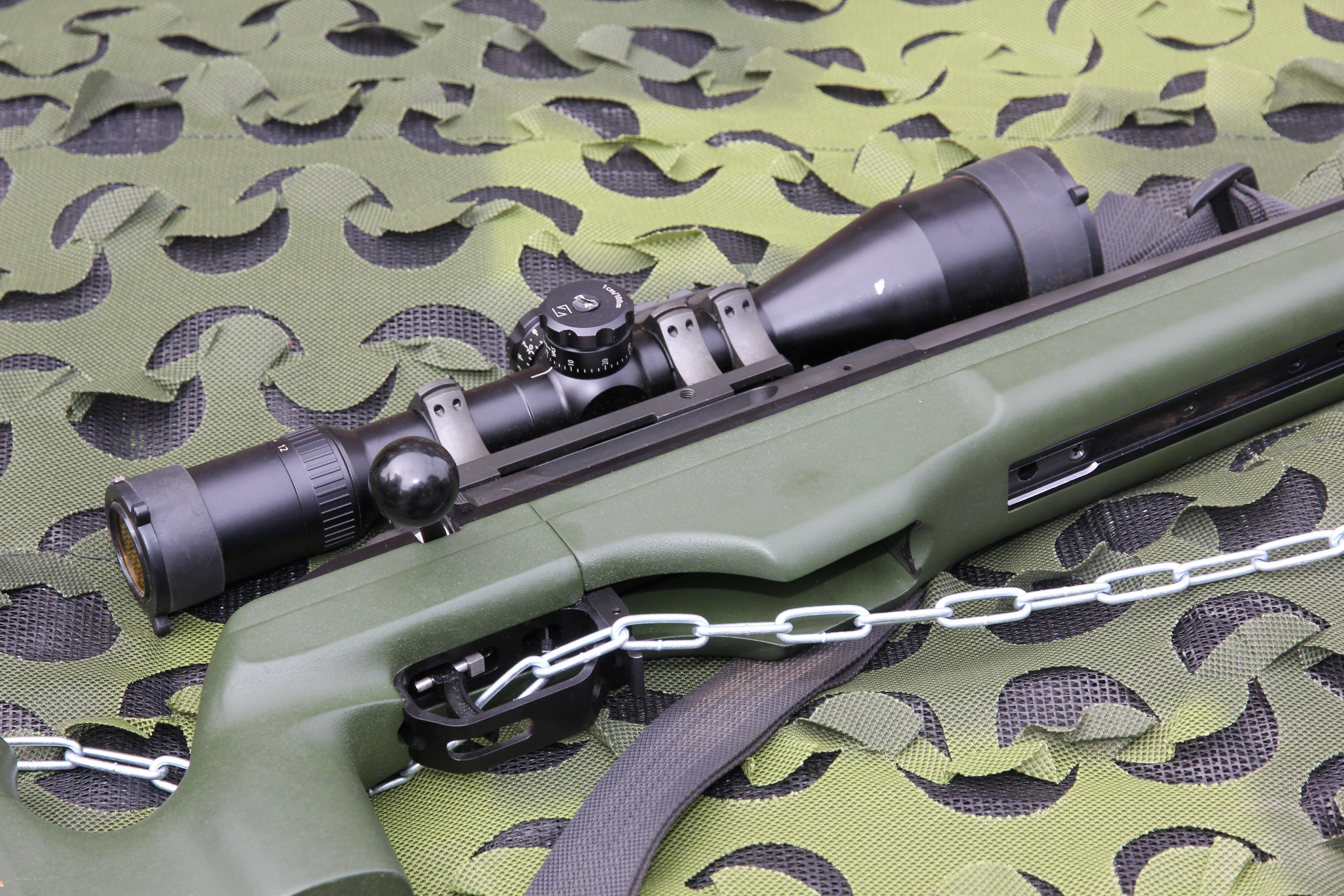
A one-piece scope mount (with three 30 mm rings) on a Sako TRG-42.

Ring mounts usually consist of a base attached to the firearm and rings (usually two) attached to the sight. The rings are usually made of steel or aluminum. Common diameters on ring mounts are 25.4 mm (1 inch), 26 mm, 30 mm and 34 mm. There are big differences in the strength and ability of sustained precision on different assemblies. With weak cartridges such as .22 LR applied in light-use scenarios, a pair of skinny aluminium rings may work well, while firearms with very powerful recoil often combined with a heavy sight may require steel rings or thicker aluminum rings with recoil lugs to be used.

=== Sizes ===
Scopes for ring mounts are available in many different sizes. The most common ones are:

- 1 inch (25.4 mm)
- 30 mm
- 34 mm

Some less common standards are:

- 3/4 inch (19 mm)
- 7/8 inch (22 mm)
- 26 mm – Some older European scopes
- 35 mm – Some IOR, Vortex and Leupold models
- 36 mm – Some Zeiss and Hensoldt models
- 40 mm – Some IOR models and Swarovski dS

=== Lapping ===
For a ring assembly to grip evenly, it is important that the scope rings are circular and coaxial with the scope tube. On ring mounts that grip unevenly, the ring mount can be lapped to prevent uneven pressure when mounting. One scopes made for ring mounts, it is not uncommon to get ring marks when mounting the rings.

=== Ring inserts ===
There are insert rings on the market which allows for mounting a scope inside a ring mount of a larger diameter. An example could be to mount a scope with a 1-inch (25.4 mm) tube in a 30 mm mount using a plastic insert.

There are also special ring mounts in the market with circularly shaped ring inserts made to provide stress free mounting without lapping, with Burris Signature Rings and Sako Optilock Rings as two well-known examples. Burris Signature was introduced in 1995. A patent was applied for in 1994, and was granted in 1995. Sako Optilock has been sold since some time in the early 2000s. The trade name Optilock was registered in the US in December 1997, and has been marketed in the US since December 2001. In 2000, Sako was sold to Beretta Holding. In 2002, Burris was also sold to Beretta Holding, and thus Burris and Sako got the same owners. Burris' original patent for the rings with the circular insertes was considered to have expired in 2014, and as of 2020 is listed as "definitely expired".

In 2015, XTR Signature Rings was launched as a further development of the Burris Signature series. The XTR variant differs in that it has two circular cavities per ring assembly versus one. A patent for the XTR Signature Rings was applied for in 2016, and was granted to Burris in 2019.

== Mounts for compact sights ==
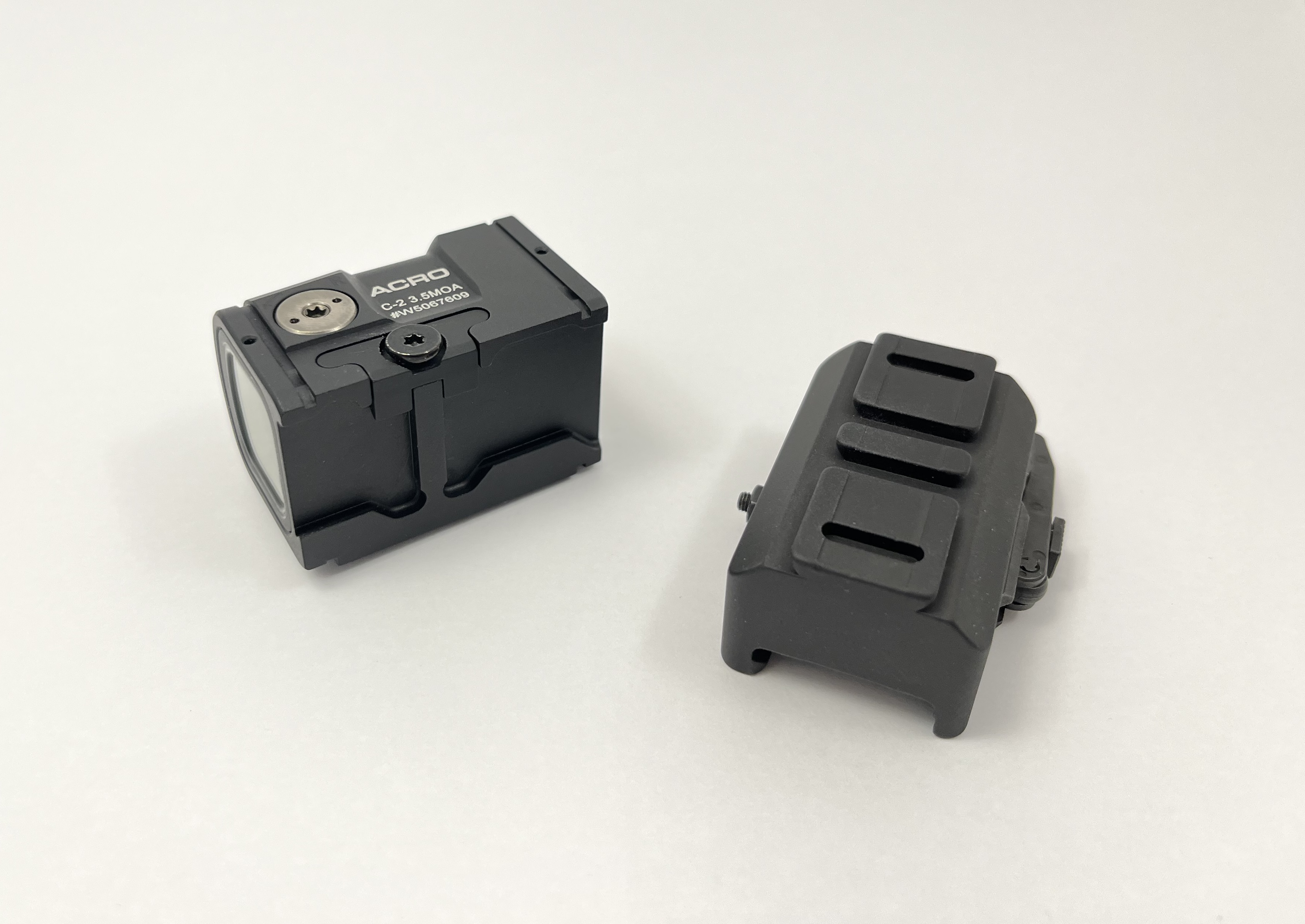
Left: Aimpoint Acro C2 reflex sight laying on its side. Right: Acro rail on a Picatinny riser.

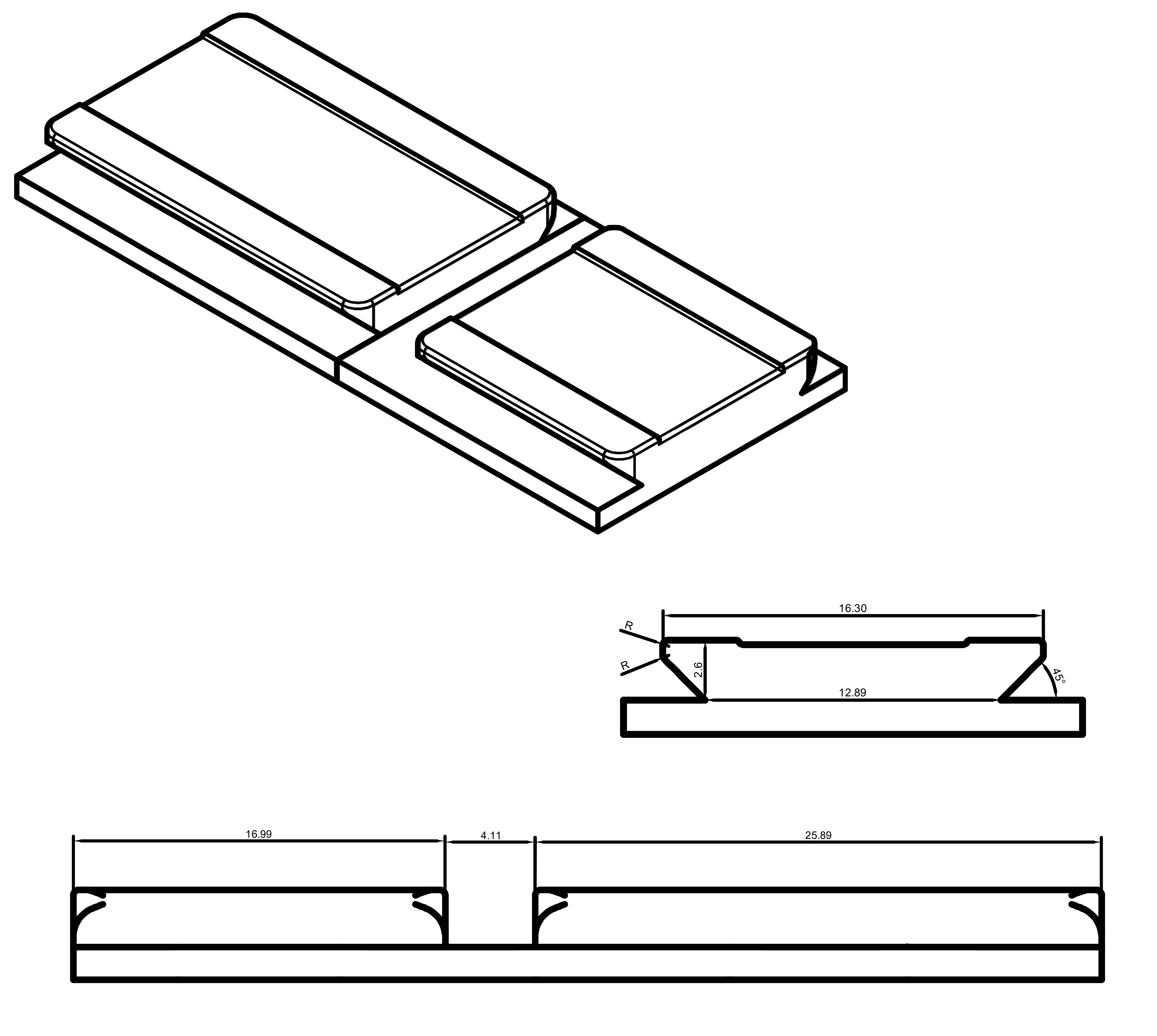
Approximate Acro rail measurements.

Many reflex sights (e.g. red dot sights) and holographic sights have proprietary mounts.

- Aimpoint Acro rail: A dovetail rail for attaching a sight via a clamping mechanism, and with a 4 mm wide straight recoil lug groove. The dovetail is approximately 16.5 mm wide, and is radiused so as not to have any sharp edges. The mount is compact enough to be used on pistols, as well as rifles and shotguns. Launched in 2019 together with the sights Aimpoint Acro P-1 and C-1. Also used on Aimpoint Acro C-2 and P-2, as well as Steiner MPS.
- Aimpoint Micro standard: First introduced in 2007 on the small tube sight variants of Aimpoint, but today used by other manufacturers as well. Popular on rifles and shotguns, but not on handguns due to its size. The mounting standard uses four screws and one cross slot acting as a recoil lug. Used on red dot sights such as Aimpoint Micro, Vortex Crossfire, Sig Sauer Romeo 4 & 5, and some Holosun Paralow variants.
- Aimpoint CompM4 mount: Launched in 2007 with the Aimpoint CompM4 sight. The sight is attached to the mount via two M5 screws from the underside, and the mount has a transverse groove acting as a recoil lug. The Aimpoint Comp line was launched in 1993. The predecessor of the CompM4, CompM2, had a 30 mm ring mount and was introduced in the American military in 2000. Some manufacturers have copied the M4 mount system, but it has mainly been used by Aimpoint.
- C-More standard: A mounting standard introduced by C-More Sights. Uses two screws and two circular notches acting as recoil lugs. Used on red dot sights such as Delta Optical MiniDot, Kahles Helia, Vortex Razor and Sig Sauer Romeo3.
- Docter/Noblex standard: The mounting pattern which through the 2010s was used by the largest number of manufacturers, perhaps due to the wide range of aftermarket mounts available. The mounting standard uses two screws and four circular notches acting as recoil lugs. Used on red dot sights such as Docter/Noblex sights, Burris Fastfire, Vortex Viper, Leica Tempus, etc.
- Shield standard: A proprietary standard used by Shield Sights. Similar in shape to the Noblex/Docter footprint, but with other dimensions. In addition to the Shield red dot sights, it is also used on the Leupold Delta Point Pro.
- Trijicon RMR/SRO-standard: Has two screw holes, and two shallow circular notches acting as recoil lugs. Mainly used on the Trijicon RMR and SRO red dot sights, as well as on some Holosun sights.
- Other: Some notable red dot sights which have unique footprints not compatible with any of the above are Sig Sauer Romeo 1, Holosun Paralow 403A, Holosun 509T and Swampfox Kraken MRDS. There also exists reflex sights for ring mounts (e.g. Aimpoint CompM2 with a 30 mm tube) or with an integrated Picatinny base.

== Link between scope and firearm ==
=== Bases ===
By bases, is usually meant an interconnecting part between the scope and the firearm. For example, a base may have a picatinny attachment on the underside, while the upper side may have either a ring (e.g. 30 mm) or rail mounting (e.g. Zeiss rail). On some assemblies, the upper and lower parts of the base are separate parts that must be screwed together and fastened to a specified torque. A base can thus sometimes constitute a complete scope mount assembly, but is most often used to refer to the lower part of a two-part scope mount assembly.

The firearm interface which sits on the firearm and to which the scope mount is attached is often called the base or rail.

Some types of bases are:

Standard mounts

- Picatinny rail: Standardized slot distances.
- Weaver rail: Varying width between the slots.
Metric dimensions on a Picatinny rail.

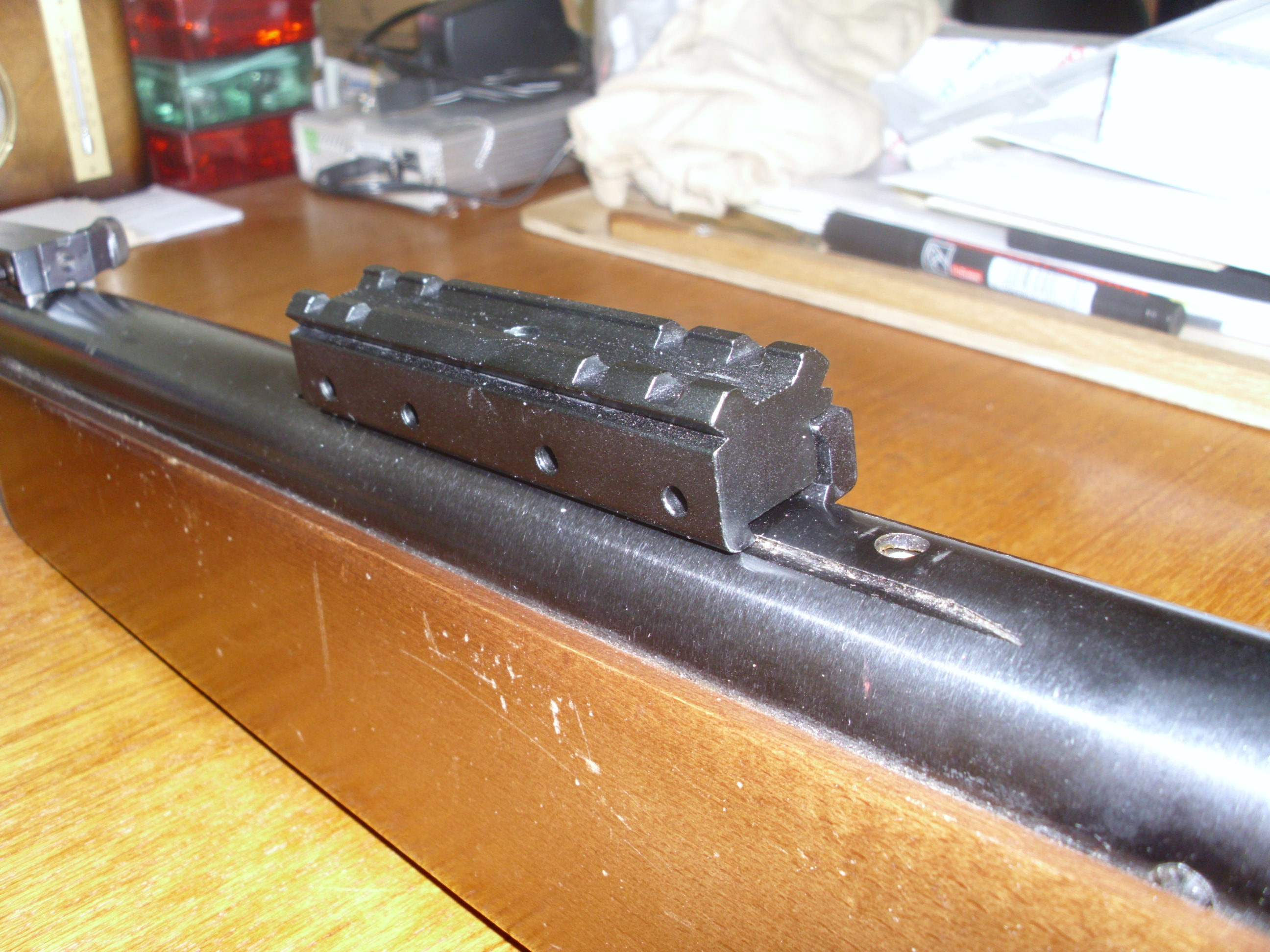
Weaver rail on an air gun.

Proprietary and brand specific mounts

- Claw mount. Several types, for example Suhl Claw Mounts, Ziegler ZP mount, and others.
- Pivot mount. Several types, for example EAW, MAKlick, Steyr Luxus, and others.
- Aimpoint Micro, also used by other red dot manufacturers. (Not compatible with Aimpoint Comp or the Aimpoint ACRO mounting standards. See Red dot sight#Mounting types for more red dot mounting standards).
- Blaser saddle mount
- Contessa 12 mm "Euro rail" mount
- Browning X-Lock
- Double dovetail, which is rotated and tapped into place. Several types, for example the Leupold Dual Dovetail
- Mauser M03 Double Square Mount
- Picatinny-against-picatinny (Burris Eliminator)
- Pulsar type rail mount. Has some visual similarities with the Zeiss rail, but is incompatible due to a wider base and steeper angle.
- Redfield type with windage adjustable mount, also known Redfield Standard Junior. Similar concepts are made by other manufacturers, e.g. "Leupold standard", "Burris TU/SU". Also manufactured by Weaver. Specifications can vary between manufacturers.
- Ruger integral type (used on Ruger No. 1, M77, Gunsite Scout, the Ranch series of the Mini-14 and Mini-30, Deerfield carbine, Model 96 (.44 Magnum only) and Ruger PC carbine.)
- Sako Optilock, either with rings separate from the bases, or with rings as part of the bases. Bases come in various variantes to fit either Sako tapered dovetail rail (available for three different types of action lengths), Tikka straight dovetail (11 mm or 17 mm), Weaver or Picatinny.
- Sako tapered dovetail rail (used on SAKO models Sako 75, Sako 85, L461, L579, S491, M591, L61R, L691, M995 and TRG-S)
- Sauer ISI mount (Sauer 303, and a very few editions of Sauer 202)
- Sauer SUM mount (Sauer 404)
- Schultz & Larsen integral Slide & Lock type
- "STANAG" Claw Mount, used on FN FAL, HK G3, HK33, G3SG/1 and MP5. Most STANAG bases must be used with corresponding STANAG rings, but there are also STANAG bases for scopes with rails.
- Dovetail rail (for example 11 mm, 17 mm or 19 mm). The flank angle varies, and dovetail rail mounts may therefore be regarded as non-standardized, even for a given witdth.
- Trijicon ACOG/VCOG rail
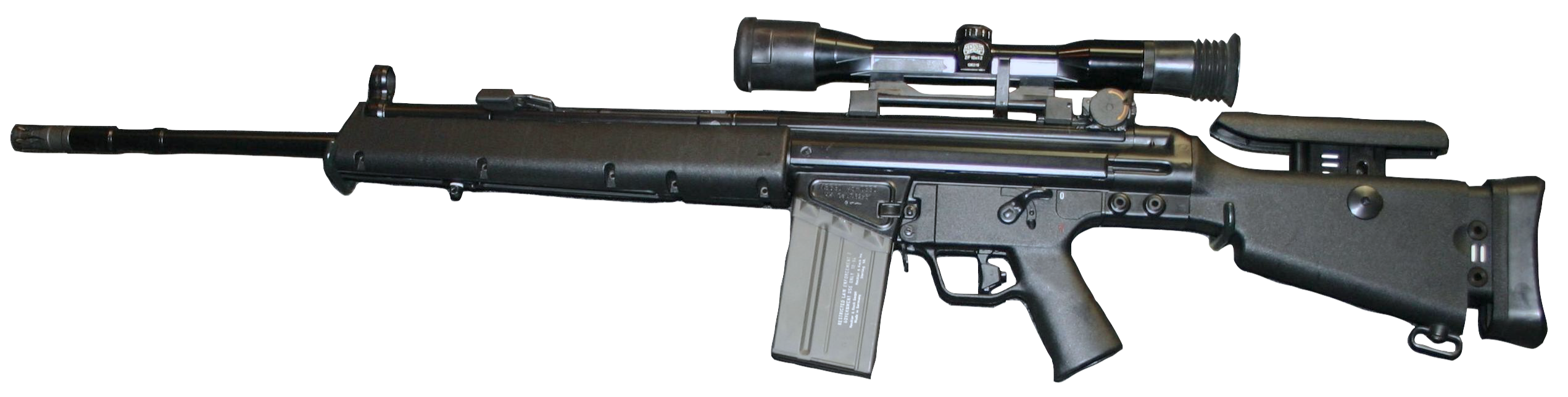
HK MSG90 with a scope sight mounted in a STANAG claw mount.

=== Screw pattern on bases ===
On receivers without an integrated attachment for mounting a scope, for example, an integrated Picatinny rail, the base is usually screwed on as a separate part. Such mounts are often model-specific to the firearm, and depend on factors such as the radius of the receiver bridge, the type of screw and the distance between the screw holes. A common fastening method is by screws. These are often metric M3.5x0.6 mm or US #6–48 (⌀ 3.5 mm, 0.53 mm pitch) or #8–40 (⌀ 4.2 mm, 0.64 mm pitch).

Many European assemblies use M3.5 screws, such as SAKO Optilock, Recknagel and original CZ rings. Since #6–48 and M3.5x0.6 have near identical diameters and almost equal pitch, there is a potential for confusion, and upon mixing the wrong screw will enter the threads, but will gradually become tighter to screw until the thread is destroyed. In case of damage, the hole must often be drilled and re-threaded, and M4x0.7 or #8–40 may then be relevant alternatives.

Remington 700 pattern

The Remington 700 Short Action (SA) scope base attachment pattern is particularly widespread, and is for example used on models such as:

- Remington Model 722, 40x, 78, 740, 742, 760, 710, 721, 722 and 725
- Mauser M1996 straight pull and Roesser Titan 16
- Mauser SR-97
- Sauer 100, Sauer 101, Mauser M18 (not the M12)
- Bergara B14 LA
- Haenel Jäger 10
- Sabatti Rover LA

The Remington 700 Long Action (LA) naturally has a longer distance between the front and rear screw holes, and therefore continuous scope mount assemblies for the 700 LA do not fit on the 700 SA nor the above-mentioned firearms. However, two-piece scope mounts in general interchange for the mentioned models.

List of common screw patterns

Bases with a rounded bottom for mounting on a round receiver bridges should ideally have a slightly smaller radius than the receiver in order to provide two points of contact and give a stable attachment. Conversely, a slightly too large radius on the mount will result in just one point of contact and a less stable attachment.

In the table below, the radius refers to the curvature of the mounting surface on the receiver bridge. The base is often attached with two screws on the front receiver bridge and two screws on the rear receiver bridge, but sometimes with several more screws. The hole distances are measured from center-to-center. Some common hole distances are 12.7, 15.37 and 21.84 mm (0.500, 0.605 and 0.860 in) respectively).

The two front screws are referred to in the list below as screws 1 and 2, and the front hole spacing is thus referred to as «distance 1–2». In the same way, the rear hole distance is called «distance 3–4». The distance between these is largely determined by the receiver length, and is stated here as «distance 2–3»

Reveicer radius and screw pattern
Receiver bridge radius (rear, front)	Distance 1–2 (front)	Distance 2–3 (middle)	Distance 3–4 (rear)	Modeller
Dovetail, 10.9 mm	12.7 mm	76.2 mm	12.7 mm	Anschütz 64
Dovetail, 11 mm	22 mm	80.3 mm	22 mm	Krieghoff Semprio
Dovetail, 11 mm	N/A	N/A	N/A	SIG Sauer SSG 3000, SIG Sauer 200 STR, Accuracy International (several models), CZ 452, CZ 453, CZ 455, CZ 511, CZ 512, CZ 513, Mauser 201, Keppeler (several models)
Dovetail, 11.26 mm	12.7 mm	76.2 mm	12.7 mm	Anschütz 54
Dovetail, 16.5 mm	21.84 mm	*Varies	21.84 mm	Tikka T3 (*82.2 mm), 55, 65, 558, 590, 690, Tikka Master, Tikka T1 (*63.8 mm).
Dovetail, 19.5 mm	N/A	N/A	N/A	CZ 527 Standard, 550 Standard, 550 Magnum
14 mm, 16.5 mm	21.84 mm	95.8 mm	12.74 mm	Carl Gustaf 1900, Husqvarna 1900, Antonio Zoli 1900
12 mm, 24 mm	21.84 mm	88.5 mm	15.4 mm	Merkel SR1
15 mm	12.5 mm	73.5 mm	12.5 mm	Schultz & Larsen Legacy
15 mm	21.84 mm	22.10 mm	21.84 mm	Anschütz 1727. Distance 1–2: 21.84 mm; distance 2–3: 22.10 mm; distance 3–4: 21.84 mm; distance 4–5: 58.67 mm; distance 5–6: 21.84 mm.
15 mm	35 mm	35 mm	N/A	Anschütz 1827 Fortner
15.65 mm	21.84 mm	52.3 mm	15.4 mm	Remington Model 4, 6, 750, Remington 870 (12 and 20 gauge), 870 TAC, 7400, 7600, Benelli M1, M1 Super 90, M2, M3. *The radius is similar, but the screw types used vary
15.9 mm	22 mm	102.4 mm	Varies, 0–13.2 mm	Mauser K98 Mauser large ring: Modell 98, Centaurian, FN, Interarms Mark X, Parker Hale 1200, Santa Barbara, as well as Mexican Mausers.
16.5 mm	22 mm	88.4 mm	22 mm	Carl Gustaf 3000, Sauer 80, 90, 92
16.5 mm, 15 mm	22 mm	103.4 mm	12.7 mm	Krico Model 700, 900, 902
16.5 mm	22 mm	107.4 mm	22 mm	Carl Gustaf 2000
16.5 mm, 18 mm	21.9 mm	110.9 mm	12.8 mm	Heym SR21
16.5 mm, 15 mm	21.9 mm	118.5 mm	12.8 mm	Heym SR30
(missing)	21.84 mm	101.66 mm	12.8 mm	Mauser M12 (not the same as Sauer 101)
(missing)	12.8 mm	54 mm	12.8 mm	Mossberg 500, 535, 835
17 mm	21.84 mm	98.0 mm	21.84 mm	Schultz & Larsen Classic DL, 68 DL, 84, 97 DL, 97, M97
17 mm	21.84 mm	110 mm	21.84 mm	Rößler Titan 3, Titan 6, Titan α
17 mm	21.84 mm	101.0 mm	21.84 mm	Schultz & Larsen Ambassador, Victory
17 mm / *	21.84 mm	100.1 mm	21.84 mm	Savage (short action): Savage Axis, Savage Edge, Roessler Titan. *Newer models have a radius on both the front and rear receiver bridges, while older models have a radius on the front bridge and a flat on the rear bridge.
17 mm / *	21.84 mm	117.58 mm	21.84 mm	Savage (long action)*Newer models have a radius on both the front and rear receiver bridges, while older models have a radius on the front bridge and a flat on the rear bridge.
17 mm, 34 mm	21.84 mm	81.7 mm	12.7 mm	Winchester Model 70 (WSSM)
17 mm, 34 mm	21.84 mm	82.8 mm	21.84 mm	Winchester Model 70 (short action)
17 mm, 34 mm	21.84 mm	85.1 mm	21.84 mm	Winchester XPR Short
17 mm, 34 mm	21.84 mm	89.4 mm	21.84 mm	Winchester Model 70 (WSM)
17 mm, 34 mm	21.84 mm	96.5 mm	21.84 mm	Winchester Model 70 (long action)
17 mm, 34 mm	21.84 mm	98.1 mm	21.84 mm	Winchester XPR Long
17 mm, 34 mm	21.84 mm	109.5 mm	21.84 mm	Winchester Model 70 (X-Long)
17 mm, 51 mm	21.84 mm	82.4 mm	21.84 mm	Remington 783 Short
17 mm, 51 mm	21.84 mm	90 mm	21.84 mm	Remington 783 Long
17 mm, 51 mm	21.84 mm	92.2 mm	N/A	Remington Model 600, 660, Mohawk
17 mm, 51 mm	21.84 mm	113.9 mm	15.4 mm	Haenel Jäger 10
17 mm, 51 mm	21.84 mm	114 mm	15.35 mm	Rößler Titan 16
17 mm, 60 mm	21.8 mm	(missing)	15.4 mm	Howa 1500 (mini action)
17 mm, 60 mm	21.84 mm	87 mm	15.4 mm	Sabatti Rover 600 (short action)
17 mm, 60 mm	21.84 mm	98.5 mm	15.4 mm	Howa 1500 (short action)
17 mm, 60 mm	21.84 mm	102.7 mm	15.4 mm	Sabatti Rover 780 (long action)
17 mm, 60 mm	21.84 mm	(missing)	15.4 mm	Weatherby 300
17 mm, 60 mm	21.84 mm	(missing)	15.4 mm	Weatherby Europa
17 mm, 60 mm	21.84 mm	98.5 mm	15.4 mm	Weatherby Vanguard Short
17 mm, 60 mm	21.84 mm	113 mm	15.4 mm	Weatherby Vanguard Long, Mark V Short
17 mm, 60 mm	21.84 mm	114 mm	15.4 mm	Howa 1500 (long action)
17.2 mm, 50.8 mm	21.84 mm	92.2 mm	15.4 mm	Remington 700-kortkasse (short action, SA). Also used on Remington Model 722, 40x, 78, 740, 742, 760, 710, 721, 722 and 725, Mauser M96 / 96S and SR 97, Sauer 100, Sauer 101, Mauser M18 (not M12), Roessler Titan 16, Bergara B14 LA, Haenel Jäger 10, Sabatti Rover LA.
17.2 mm, 50.8 mm	21.84 mm	113.9 mm	15.4 mm	Remington 700-langkasse (long action, LA). Sauer 100, Sauer 101.
17.4 mm	21.8 mm	93 mm	21.8 mm	Sauer 200 (not 200 STR)
17.4 mm	21.84 mm	94.2 mm	21.84 mm	Sauer 202
17.4 mm	21.84 mm	100.2 mm	21.84 mm	Sauer 202 Magnum
17.5 mm	21.9 mm	98.5 mm	2x15.4 mm	Anschütz 1780, 1781
17.5 mm	21.84 mm	98.5 mm	2X15.4 mm	Haenel SLB 2000 Plus (+), H&K SLB 2000
17.5 mm	21.84 mm	98.5 mm	2x15.4 mm	Merkel SR1 Basic
17.5 mm	10 mm	99.9 mm	10 mm	Steyr-Mannlicher Luxus (l, m, s)
17.5 mm	10 mm	100.5 mm	10 mm	Steyr-Mannlicher (medium action, older models)
17.5 mm	21.84 mm	56 mm	21.84 mm	Steyr-Mannlicher (super short action): Classic, Pro Hunter
17.5 mm	21.84 mm	76 mm	21.84 mm	Steyr-Mannlicher (short action): Classic, Pro Hunter, Export, SM12
17.5 mm	21.84 mm	83 mm	21.84 mm	Steyr-Mannlicher (medium action): Classic, Pro Hunter, Export, SM12
17.5 mm	21.84 mm	87.5 mm	21.84 mm	Steyr-Mannlicher (long action): Classic, Pro Hunter, Export, SM12
17.5 mm, 18 mm, 14 mm	(varies)	(varies)	(varies)	Mauser Modell 93, 94, 95 and 96, samt Kurz. Mauser small ring (G33/40, vz. 33).
18 mm	12.7 mm	81 mm	12.7 mm	Browning Acera, Browning Maral, Benelli ARGO, Browning BAR, Winchester SXR Vulcan, Fabarm Iris
19.1 mm	(varies)	(varies)	(varies)	Mauser Magnum (commercial)
34 mm	21.8 mm	82.4 mm	21.8 mm	Sako A7 (short action)
34 mm	21.8 mm	84.5 mm	21.8 mm	Sako A7 (medium action)
34 mm	21.8 mm	95.5 mm	21.8 mm	Sako A7 (long action)
34 mm (35.6 mm)	21.84 mm	76 mm	14 mm	Browning A-Bolt (short I)
34 mm (35.6 mm)	21.8 mm	79 mm	21.8 mm	Browning A-Bolt (short II)
34 mm (35.6 mm)	21.8 mm	82.5 mm	21.8 mm	Browning A-Bolt (short III)
34 mm (35.6 mm)	21.8 mm	98.1 mm	21.8 mm	Browning A-Bolt (long III)
(missing)	17.78 mm	71.74 mm	17.78 mm	Browning X-Bolt (super short)
(missing)	17.78 mm	74.74 mm	17.78 mm	Browning X-Bolt (short)
(missing)	17.78 mm	93.84 mm	17.78 mm	Browning X-Bolt (long)
38.1 mm	12.7 mm	65.35 mm	15.4 mm	Ruger 10/22
Flat	12.7 mm	47.6 mm	12.7 mm	Marlin 1894
Flat	12.7 mm	Varies*	12.7 mm	Marlin Model 1894, 1895, 336, 338, 308, 444.*The distance between the front and rear base varies, and can for instance be 47.6 mm, 60.3 mm or 69.85 mm.

== Other features ==
=== Quick release ===
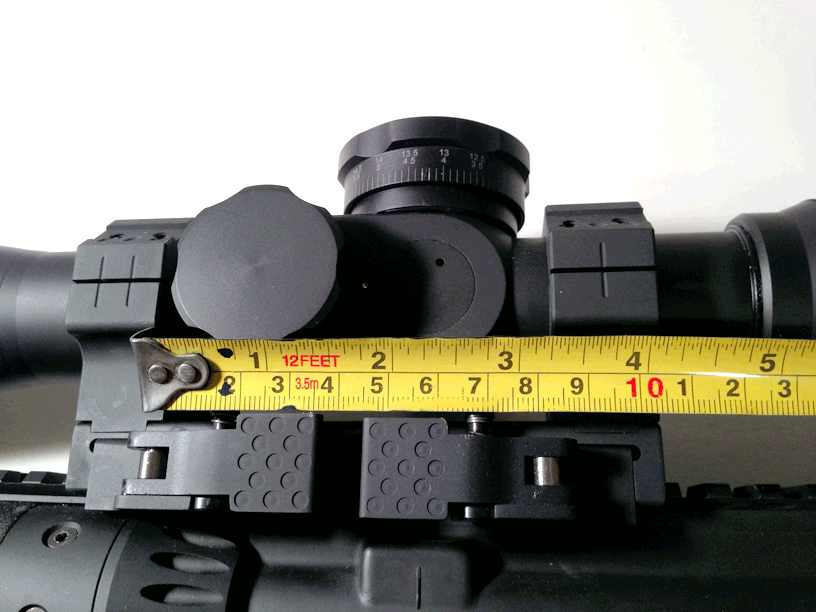
Picatinny ring mount with two quick-detach levers.

Quick release (QR) can refer to several different variants of scope mounts which can be mounted and disassembled quickly without tools.

=== Tilt ===
In some cases, it may be relevant to add extra inclination to the scope to be able to shoot at longer (or shorter) distance. For example, this is popular for long range shooting, where it is common to use a tilt of 6 mrad (20 MOA). Extra tilt can be achieved several ways, like for example with a tilted Picatiny rail (e.g. 6 mrad tilt), with bases or rings (e.g. 6 mrad tilt) or with special insert rings (e.g. Burris Pos-Align).

== Scope height ==
The height of scope sight can be important for the cheek rest support (often called cheek weld) to gain correct eye placement, as well as for calculating ballistics (e.g. a ballistic table). The latter is particularly relevant at very close ranges (e.g. 15 meters [49 feet]), while at longer distances, such as in long range shooting, the scope height has less impact on the ballistic calculations.

The height of a scope sight can be measured in many ways. With regard to ballistic calculations, it is generally only measured from the center of the bore axis to the center of the scope sight (sightline). With regard to cheek support, several methods are used: On firearms with a picatinny rail, the height is measured from the top of the picatinny rail on the firearm. On most other types of bases it is common to measure from the top radius of the receiver bridge.

When the bottom measuring point is determined, the height is then measured up to either the optical center or the bottom of the scope tube, on scopes for ring mounts. The difference between these two measuring methods is distance from the optical center to the bottom of the scope tube, and usually corresponds to half of the tube diameter (e.g. 15 mm on binoculars with a 30 mm tube).

== See also ==
- M-LOK
- Bipod
