= Sauer 100 =

German bolt action rifle

- Type: Repeating rifle
- Place of origin: Germany

Production history
- Designer: Sauer & Sohn
- Produced: 2016-current

Specifications
- Mass: 3.1 kg
- Length: 560-620 mm (barrel), 1066-1130 mm (rifle)
- Cartridge: .222 Rem, .223 Rem, .243 Win, 6.5 Creedmoor, 6.5 PRC, 6.5x55, .270 Win, 7mm-08, 7mm Rem Mag, .308 Win, .30-06, .300 Win Mag, 8x57, 9.3x62
- Action: Bolt action
- Sights: Prepared for scope mount

Sauer 100 is a bolt-action rifle manufactured by Sauer & Sohn that was launched in 2016. It is an entry-level rifle from Sauer, and is produced in the same factory and shares many parts with Mauser M18.

== Technical ==
The stock comes with a proprietary bedding called "Ever-Rest" which consists of a metal block around the front action screw. The rifle is available in many variants, such as:

- Atacama
- Ceratech
- Cherokee
- Fieldshoot
- Pantera

The action has a very similar outer profile to the Remington 700 enabling it to accept standard Remington 700 pattern scope mounts. The trigger has one stage, with an adjustable weight between 1000 and 2000 grams (2.2 to 4.4 lbs).

The bolt has 3 locking lugs and a 60 degree bolt throw. The lugs neither locks into the action nor the barrel, but instead locks into a breech ring mounted between the barrel and action. The barrel is mounted to the receiver with action threads and is not a press fit like other Sauer models. The barrel can be delivered from the factory with M15x1 muzzle threads, while M14x1 and 1/2"-28 threads are available by order).

== See also ==
- Sauer 90
- Sauer 101
- Sauer 200
- Sauer 202
- Sauer 303
- Sauer 404
