= Sauer 101 =

German bolt action rifle

- Type: Repeating rifle
- Place of origin: Germany

Production history
- Designer: Sauer & Sohn
- Produced: 2013-current

Specifications
- Mass: 2.5 kg
- Length: 510-560 mm (barrel)
- Cartridge: .243 Win., 6,5x55, .308 Win, .270 Win, 7x64, .30-06, 8x57, 9,3x62, 7 mm Rem Mag, .300 Win Mag
- Action: Bolt action
- Sights: Prepared for scope mount

Sauer 101 is a bolt action rifle manufactured by Sauer & Sohn that was launched in 2013. The rifle is manufactured on the same factory and shares many parts with the Mauser M12.

== Technical ==
The stock comes with a proprietary bedding system called "Ever-Rest" which consists of a metal block around the front action screw. The rifle was launched in two variants; "Classic" with a walnut stock and "Classic XT" with a black synthetic stock. Several other variants have since been introduced, including:

- Artemis
- Classic
- Classic XTA
- Classic XT
- Forest
- Forest XT
- GTI
- Highland XTX
- Select

The receiver has an outside profile similar to the Remington 700 which allows for the use of standard Remington 700 scope pattern scope mount.

The bolt has 6 locking lugs and a 60 degree bolt throw, and locks directly into the barrel instead of into the receiver. The barrel is mounted to the receiver without action threads with a press fit and heat.

== See also ==
- Sauer 90
- Sauer 100
- Sauer 200
- Sauer 202
- Sauer 303
- Sauer 404
