= Mauser M1996 =

Mauser M96
- Type: Repeating rifle
- Place of origin: Germany

Production history
- Designer: Mauser
- Manufacturer: Mauser (1996-1997), Roessler (2013-current)

Specifications
- Mass: 2.8 kg
- Barrel length: 560 mm (standard), 610 mm (magnum)
- Cartridge: Standard: .243 Win, .308 Win, .25-06 Rem, .270 Win, 7x64 mm, .30-06, 9.3x62 mm. Magnum: 7 mm Rem Mag, .300 Win Mag
- Action: Straight-pull bolt-action
- Sights: Drilled and tapped for a scope mount

Mauser M1996, also known as Mauser M96 or Mauser M96 S, is a straight-pull rifle which was introduced by the German firearms manufacturer Mauser in 1996. The rifle had a blind magazine which was loaded from the top, and the bolt was operated by pulling the bolt handle about 30 degrees along the longitudinal axis of the firearm. The factory trigger pull weight was a little over 2 kg, and was not adjustable. Due to the construction of the trigger geometry it has proven difficult to lighten the trigger pull without experiencing problems with light primer strikes. The locking lugs are angled slightly to aid with primary extraction. The rifle was delivered with a traditional slim wooden stock where the height of the comb was adapted for shooting with iron sights. The receiver came drilled and tapped for attaching a scope mount.

The Mauser M1996 was not immediately a commercial success compared to competitors such as the Blaser R93 launched three years earlier. The patent and the rights to M1996 were later acquired by Roessler and sold under the model name Rößler Titan 16, which was produced as of 2020 but has since been discontinued. The name Titan 16 comes from the fact that the bolt of these two rifles have two rows of 8 locking lugs, which gives 16 locking lugs in total. The Titan 16 is modular firearm where the barrel can be changed using a hex key. Contrary to the M1996, the Titan 16 has an adjustable direct trigger.

== See also ==
- Blaser R8
- Lynx 94
- Mauser M12
- Mauser M18
