= SIG Sauer 205 =

- Type: Bolt-action repeating rifle
- Place of origin: Germany

Service history
- Used by: Primarily Swiss sport shooters

Production history
- Designer: SIG Sauer
- Manufacturer: J. P. Sauer & Sohn GmbH
- Produced: Around 1994 to 2007
- Variants: Moose biathlon, Sport/Target, Supersport/Phantom, Police

Specifications
- Mass: 5,400 g (11.9 lb)
- Length: 1,150 mm (45 in) (with a 660 mm barrel)
- Barrel length: 660 mm (26.0 in)
- Cartridge: 5.56×45mm NATO, 6mm BR, 6.5×55mm, 7.5×55mm Swiss,.308 Winchester, 7.62×51mm NATO,.22 LR
- Action: Bolt-action
- Muzzle velocity: 7.5×55mm Swiss: 11.3 gram bullet at 750 m/s
- Effective firing range: Used in Swiss competitions from 100 to 600 meters
- Feed system: 10-round double stack box magazine
- Sights: Barrel mounted globe sight (optional), 11 mm dovetail rail on receiver for mounting diopter rear sight, or a scope sight, either directly or via a picatinny rail adapter

SIG Sauer 205 is a bolt-action rifle formerly produced by SIG Sauer. The rifle was produced in several variants for competition shooting and law enforcement.

== History ==
The 205 mechanism was designed in the late 1980s as a bid for an open competition where the Scandinavian rifle associations had come together looking to replace their aging competition rifles. Until then, the Frivilliga Skytterörelsen in Sweden had used different rifles based on the Swedish Mauser, such as the Carl Gustaf CG 63, 73, 74 and 80 target rifles. Det frivillige Skyttervesen in Norway had used Krag–Jørgensen and various rebuilt Mauser K98k actions, such as the KV59 and M67. De Danske Skytteforeninger in Denmark had used Krag–Jørgensen and various rebuilt Mauser K98k actions, such as the S&L M52. The three organisations had agreed on electing a common rifle, and amongst others Heckler & Koch, Mauser, Steyr, Winchester and SIG Sauer made bids with different types of rifles. The design which later was later to become the SIG Sauer 200 STR was favoured by the Scandinavian associations over what was later to become the SIG Sauer 205. The SIG Sauer 200 STR was launched in 1989, and became approved for Scandinavian rifle competitions from 1 January 1990 in the calibers .22 LR, 6.5×55mm and 7.62×51mm NATO. The 205 design was however not put aside, since it was deemed more suitable for the competition rules within the CISM and ISSF 300 meter disciplines. In 1994, the 205 design was approved for competition within the Swiss Shooting Sport Federation in caliber 7.5×55mm Swiss. The rifle was available for Swiss sport shooters in 1995, and shooters could compete with the rifle in the Swiss category A competitions from 1995. The rifle enjoyed some popularity in Switzerland, but were noted as being quite more expensive than the competitions rifles used previously in the Swiss shooting association. Competition rifles in the 7.5mm caliber intended for the Swiss market has rarely been seen outside Switzerland due to the uncommon 12.72 mm (0.501 in) diameter bolt face of the 7.5×55mm Swiss cartridge.

== Technical ==
=== Receiver ===
The receiver was machined out of a massive block of steel, and was then blued. The action was delivered in either a right or left hand version. The mechanical safety is placed on the tang of the stock (similar to the 202) so that the safety can be disengaged without putting the finger inside the trigger guard. The magazine is a proprietary staggered feed double stack type. The action uses the so-called "fat bolt" principle, enabling smooth operation of the bolt. The bolt lugs engage directly into the barrel with a 60 degree rotation. The firing pin is relatively lightweight, giving a lock time of 2.4 milliseconds.

=== Stock ===
The wood stock has a two-piece design with a separate forend and buttstock, eliminating the need for bedding the action. The two piece design resembles that of the SIG Sauer 202 stock, but the two designs are not compatible. Different models of the 205 were available with wooden stocks of walnut, beechwood or laminated beechwood. An aluminium chassis stock was also available on some models.

Moose Biathlon

The 205 MBR (Moose Biathlon Rifle) was made for the Finnish market and their fullbore moose biathlon competitions called hirvenhiihto. The stock was made out of dark walnut, had an adjustable cheek rest and length of pull, and an integrated UIT rail on the underside of the forend. The rifle came in the .308 Winchester caliber, which is an approved cartridge for moose hunting in Sweden and Finland. It was common to mount a scope sight for moose biathlon competitions.

Sport/ Target/Standard rifle (Standardgewehr)

The Sport came with a 670 mm match barrel in the 7.5×55mm Swiss caliber. It had a two part laminated beechwood stock with an adjustable cheek rest and length of pull, as well as an integrated UIT rail on the underside of the forend. Included was a rail mounted hand stop, a mirage band, and a precision iron sight setup consisting of a diopter rear and a globe front sight. The diopter rear sight came with an adjustable iris opening between 0.8 and 2.2 millimeters.

Supertarget/Phantom

The Supertarget and Phantom differed by having a skeletonized chassis stock in anodized aluminium with an adjustable pistol grip made by Hämmerli. The Supertarget was intended for ISSF competitions. The Phantom was a sniper model introduced at the 2005 IWA-show, and was also marketed in the US as the Sauer ATLR - Advanced Tactical Long Range.

Police

The Police version came in a black laminated wood stock, and was also marketed under the name Sauer S 205 SSG.

=== Barrel ===
The SIG Sauer 205 uses the same bolt and quick-change barrel system as the SIG Sauer 200 STR and SSG3000, meaning that the barrel can be easily changed by using a 5 mm hex key. Original barrels in .22 LR, 6.5×55mm and .308 Winchester/7.62×51mm NATO are still produced by SIG Sauer, while aftermarket barrels in these calibers are available from manufacturers such as Blaser, Heym, Lothar Walther, Schultz & Larsen and Våpensmia.

Formerly, barrels were also available in the calibers 5.56×45mm NATO, 6mm BR and 7.5×55mm Swiss. A .22 LR conversion kit for the 205 was also available, consisting of a separate bolt, barrel and magazine, but is no longer produced. Different types of bolts were used with the different caliber groups, for example the 5.56 bolt had three locking lugs, while the larger calibers (like the 7.62 bolt) had six locking lugs.

=== Trigger ===
The 205 has a two-stage trigger with a pull weight of 1500 grams. The 205 trigger have many similarities and share much of the same internal design with the 200 STR, but there are also some significant differences, for example in the design of the shape of the housing and placement of the safety.

== See also ==
- Sauer 80/90
- Sauer 200
- Sauer 202
- SIG Sauer 200 STR
- Sauer 404
