= Heym SR 30 =

German repeating rifle

- Type: Straight-pull bolt action rifle
- Place of origin: Germany

Production history
- Designer: Peter Fortner junior
- Manufacturer: Heym
- Unit cost: 1,850 - 25,700 EUR 2021 equivalent
- Produced: 1998-current
- Variants: Classic, Classic Keiler, Premium, Classic Concord, Super Classic, Royal, Grand Royal

Specifications
- Mass: 3.1–3.6 kg (6.8–7.9 lb)
- Length: 1,110–1,140 mm (43.70–44.88 in)
- Barrel length: 500–610 mm (19.69–24.02 in)
- Cartridge: Several, see below.
- Action: Roller locked straight pull
- Sights: Open sights, or prepared for scope mount

The Heym SR 30 is a straight-pull rifle produced in Germany by Heym. The rifle is also available in a left hand version.

== Locking mechanism ==
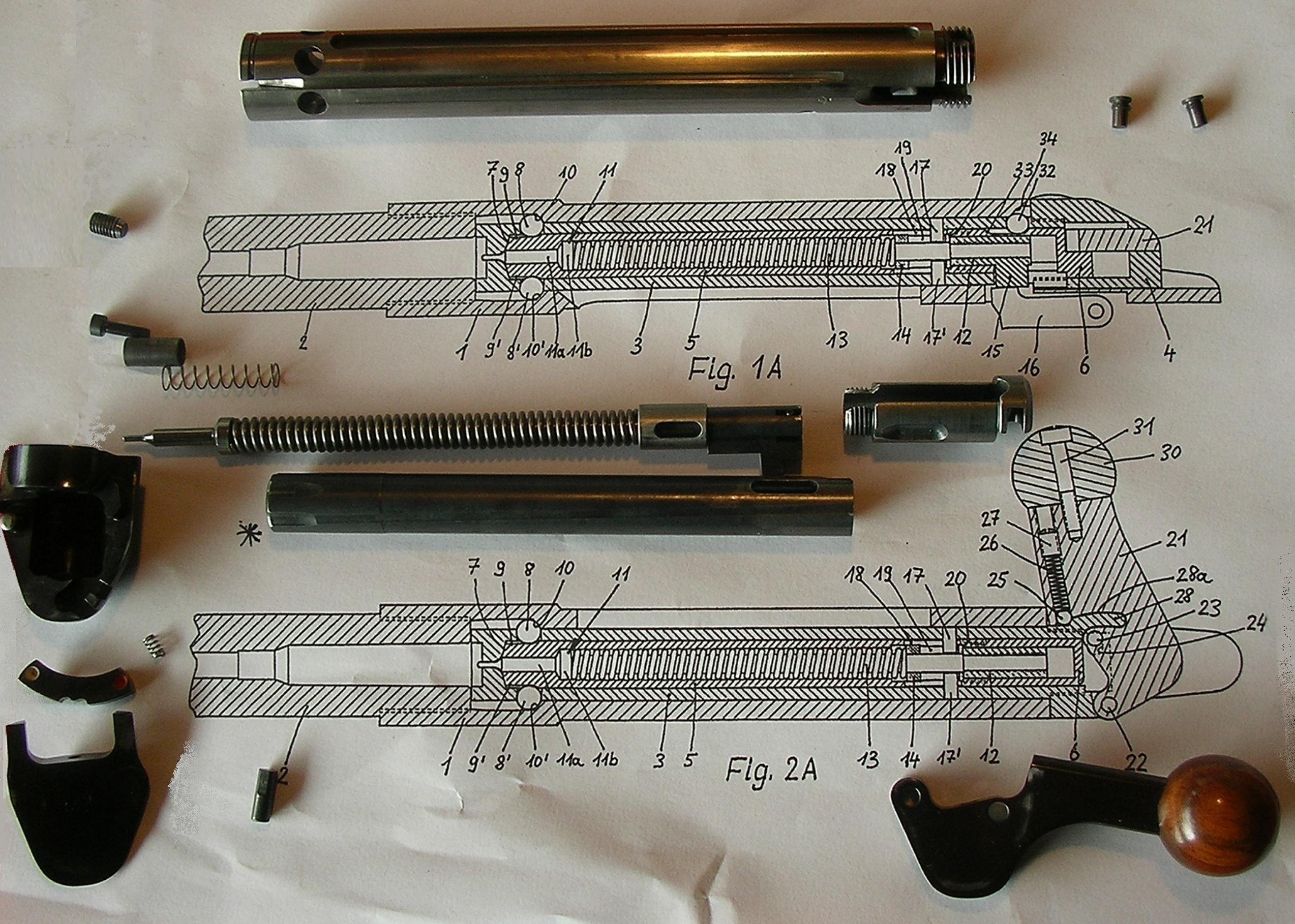
Disassembled bolt of the Heym SR 30

The mechanism uses 6 ball bearings symmetrically positioned around the circumference of the bolt head as locking elements. When the bolt handle is pushed forward, it forces a central plunger down the interior of the bolt body, forcing the 6.5 mm (0.256 in) diameter ball bearings out to lock into a negative recess in the receiver. There are not six matching negative shaped (concave) recesses in the receiver. That would be very hard to practically produce at the required precision level. Instead there is a simple continuous groove machined for the six ball bearings to lock into. The continuous semi-round groove in conjunction with the barrel positions the bolt to the front and back and regulates a practically achievable headspace during production. The lockup strengthens with increased chamber pressure. The plunger retracts when the bolt handle is pulled back, allowing the locking bearings to retract into the bolt body so the bolt can open. The bolt can be classified as a semi-rigid type, since the locking elements are movably mounted on the bolt.

Primary extraction is performed by retracting the bolt handle, which uses leverage from the opposite side of the bolt to swing the handle to the open position, giving a mechanical advantage.

The bolt handle can be placed in three positions: (1) Open, (2) Locked and uncocked, and (3) Locked and cocked. By pressing the bolt handle fully forward to position 3 the user can manually cock the action just before firing. When the user chooses not to fire manually pulling the bolt handle backward to position 2 uncocks the action again for safe carry.

The locking mechanism was designed by Peter Fortner junior. A preceding example of a semi-rigid bolt lock using ball bearings as locking elements is the Anschütz 1827 Fortner rifle, also designed by Peter Fortner junior. Peter Fortner junior patented the in the Anschütz 1827 Fortner used locking mechanism in 1984. Unlike the Heym SR 30 six ball bearings the seven ball bearings in the .22 LR (5.6×15mmR) chambered Anschütz 1827 Fortner are located at the back of the bolt. As the commercial introduction of the Heym SR 30 occurred within 20 years after 1984, Peter Fortner junior's patent at the time had not expired.

Heym states they successfully had the SR 30 locking mechanism tested by the C.I.P. accredited Suhl proofhouse loaded up to a P_{max} piezo pressure of 800.0 MPa (116,030 psi; 8,000 bar). Websites report on a Heym SR 30 rifle chambered in .30-06 Springfield subjected to by QuickLOAD calculated/predicted peak chamber pressure tests of 1,000.0 MPa (145,040 psi; 10,000 bar) (a 241% overload) and 1,070.0 MPa (155,190 psi; 10,700 bar) (a 258% overload) by firing intentionally incorrectly loaded .30-06 Springfield cartridges. These pressure levels generate over double the maximum allowed bolt thrust and the 258% overload comes near the bolt thrust exhibited by a .50 BMG (12.7×99mm NATO) cartridge. After examining the remotely fired rifle the SR 30 extractor turned out to be damaged as high pressure gases out of ruptured cartridge cases were relieved out of the action, and the bolt was deformed rendering the rifle unusable. The bolt was however retained in the rifle during these tests avoiding a catastrophic failure of parts unintentionally moving backwards towards the user type.

=== Similar Designs ===
The Savage Arms Impulse straight-pull rifle introduced in early 2021 features a similar locking mechanism as the SR 30. Besides differences in the applied control mechanisms a major technical difference between the locking mechanisms of the Heym SR 30 and Savage Impulse rifles is that the 6 'hexlock' hardened steel locking bearings of the Savage Impulse bolt head, lock into a machined half-round recess of a steel barrel extension, allowing the use of a receiver made of mechanically less robust but lighter 7075-T6 billet aluminum with an integral 20-MOA picatinny rail and the possibility for the user to switch bolts and barrels to use different chamberings when such parts become available. At the introduction three hunting orientated Savage Impulse model variants were available. Their listed weights vary between 8.4–9.1 lb (3.8–4.1 kg). In 2022 a dedicated long range or precision model using an adjustable aluminum chassis stock and detachable box magazine became available that is offered in chamberings up to the high bolt thrust .338 Lapua Magnum.

== Trigger ==
The rifle is offered with two trigger options, either a shotgun style trigger set at 1600 grams or a set trigger set to 1100 grams. To activate the lighter release, the set trigger must be pushed forward.

== Cartridges ==
The rifle is available in the two main configurations SR 30 N (normal cartridges) and SR 30 G (larger cartridges).

Normal action
The Heym SR 30 N is available chambered for .22-250, .243 Win, .25-06, 6.5mm Creedmoor, 6.5×55mm, 6.5×64mm, .270 Win, 7×57mm, 7×64mm, .308 Win, .30-06, 30-06 Ackley Improved, 8×57 JS, 8×64mm S, 8.5×63mm and 9.3×62mm.

Magnum action
The Heym SR 30 G (Groß meaning large) is available chambered for 6.5×68mm, .270 WSM, .300 WSM, 7mm Rem Mag, .300 Win Mag, 8×68mm S, .338 Win Mag and .375 Ruger.

Mini action
The rifle is also available in a smaller Mini Calibre action length for the chamberings .222 Rem and .223 Rem, but this action length is only available in a right handed version.

== Barrels ==
The rifle comes with a hammer forged barrel made in-house at Heym. The SR 30 uses traditional action threads for fixing the barrel to the receiver. Barrel change must be performed by a competent gunsmith, and consists of setting the headspace as well as fitting the recoil lug between the barrel and stock.

== Precision ==
The Heym High Performance Precision rifle variant is guaranteed by the factory to deliver a five shot group of 20 mm at 100 meters (0.2 mrad). This is equivalent to 0.72 inches at 100 yd, or just below 0.69 moa.

== See also ==
- Blaser R8
- Lynx 94
- Mauser M1996 / Rößler Titan 16
- List of straight pull rifles
