= Husqvarna 1900 =

Swedish bolt action rifle

Husqvarna 1900, Carl Gustaf 1900
- Type: Repeating rifle
- Place of origin: Sweden

Production history
- Produced: 1967-1979

Specifications
- Mass: 3.2 kg
- Length: 580 mm (barrel)
- Cartridge: .222 Rem to 9.3×62mm
- Action: Bolt action

Husqvarna 1900, later Carl Gustaf 1900, is a bolt-action rifle developed in Sweden in the 1960s by Husqvarna Vapenfabrik, which also produced the rifle from 1967 to 1970. The rifle was produced in the variants Standard, Monte Carlo, Monte Carlo Lux and a sport model, and got a reputation for having a very high quality. In 1970 the department producing the rifle was sold to Förenade Fabriksverken (FFV), and the production was moved to Carl Gustafs Gevärsfaktori in Eskilstuna without large changes. Production in Eskilstuna was ended in 1979.

== Copies ==
It has been claimed that the factory towards the end of the 1970s was instructed to reduce costs, resulting in parts of the production being moved to subcontractors in southern Europe. The quality of the assembled firearm is then claimed to have varied a lot from year to year. After a while copies of the rifle also started appearing on the market, for example under the names "Viking 1900" and "SG 1900" (SG meansing svenskt gevär, lit. Swedish Rifle). All these were allegedly produced or assembled in the Zoli factory in Italy. One of these copies is still sold today under the name Antonio Zoli 1900. Antonio Zoli has since bought the design.

== Technical ==
=== Stock ===
The Husqvarna 1900 stock was made of walnut, and was available both in a Monte Carlo shape and a classic shape without cheek pad. The internal magazine had a staggered feed, and the firearm safety was placed on the side.

=== Action ===
The action was made in one length only, but with four different lengths of bolt travel depending on the caliber. The bolt travel and magazine was thus fitted according to the cartridge length. These lengths were fitted to calibers such as .222/.223 Rem, .243 Win/.308 Win, 6.5×55mm and 30-06. Rails for mounting a scope to the receiver are available, for instance Weaver or Picatinny.

=== Barrel ===
The barrel is attached to the receiver using traditional action threads. The rifle was delivered from factory in calibers such as .222 Rem, .223 Rem, .22-250, .243 Win, 6,5 × 55 mm, .270 Win, 7 mm Rem Mag, .300 Win Mag, .308 Win, .30-06 and 9.3 × 62 mm.

=== Trigger ===
The standard trigger was a single stage, but the rifle was also available with a set trigger. The trigger pull weight was set to 1500 grams from the factory.

== Carl Gustaf 2000 ==
Carl Gustaf CG 2000 is a successor of the CG 1900.

Just when CG 2000 was about to be launched, Carl Gustaf received a large order from the Swedish Armed Forces for the Kulspruta 58 (ksp m/58, the Swedish version of the FN MAG ). The civilian production of CG 2000 was therefore postponed, and Carl Gustaf instead purchased the rights to import finished and semi-finished rifles from Sauer. Sauer 80 was sold under the name Carl Gustaf 3000, while Sauer 200 was sold as Carl Gustaf 4000. The receivers were made in Germany and had house marks from Sauer. The barrel and stock was usually produced and fitted in Sweden. Some models were produced entirely in Germany. CG 3000 and CG 4000 was sold by Carl Gustaf until they decided to resume production of the model 2000 towards the end of the last century.

There are two generations of the CG 2000, which are called MKI and MKII respectively. MKI is said to have had some recurring minor issues, like a weak bolt spring and oil on the bolt spraying towards the shooter when pulling the trigger. Both generations had a detachable single stack magazine. The trigger was made using rollers, and has received some criticism.

== See also ==
- SIG Sauer SSG 2000
- Krag-Jørgensen
- Remington Model 7600
