= Sauer 404 =

- Type: Bolt-action repeating rifle
- Place of origin: Germany

Production history
- Designer: Sauer & Sohn
- Manufacturer: J. P. Sauer & Sohn GmbH

Specifications
- Mass: 3220 g (560 mm barrel)
- Length: 1015 to 1125 mm (510 and 620 mm barrel respectively)
- Cartridge: Several, see below
- Action: Bolt-action
- Sights: Proprietary rail

The Sauer 404 is a lightweight bolt-action rifle manufactured by Sauer & Sohn. The rifle was launched in 2015, and is a direct successor of the Sauer 202. It has a modular construction allowing for easy replacement of components and changing between barrels with different chamberings. This 404 is currently made in a large selection of chamberings and a modular barrel-change system allows changing between chamberings.

While the 404 has a similar appearance to the 202 on the outside, it has several upgrades and updates, and parts are not necessarily compatible. Some differences are that the 404 has a manual cocking lever instead of a push button safety like on the 202. Unlike the 202, the 404 uses the same receiver for magnum and non-magnum cartridges.

== Universal tool ==
With the rifle, Sauer introduced the Sauer Universal Tool, also known as the Sauer Universal Key (SUK) or Sauer Universal-Schlüssel (SUS) in German. This is essentially a 5 mm hex key integrated into the front sling swivel stud, and can be used to disassemble the forend, buttstock, switch barrels or adjust the trigger.

== Receiver ==
The receiver has no holes for a scope mount, but instead features a new proprietary integrated quick-detach scope mounting system called Sauer Universal Mount, which resembles two NATO rail slots, however the two standards are not compatible. Original and aftermarket scope mounts are available for either scope rail mounts (like the Zeiss inner rail) or traditional ring mounts. The magazine release button can be locked to avoid losing the magazine while hunting.

== Trigger ==
The trigger weight can be adjusted by the user after the forend has been removed using the included Sauer universal tool or a 5 mm hex key. Pull weight can then be switched between the four different settings of either 550, 750, 1000 or 1250 grams (±50 g), or about 1.2, 1.7, 2.2 and 2.7 pounds respectively. To suit shooters with large or small hands, the end user can also adjust the position of the trigger about 5 millimeters forward or rearward, as well as canting the trigger left or right.

== Barrels ==
The barrel change system has been renewed, and 404 barrels are not interchangeable with the older 202 barrels. As opposed to the 202, where the whole bolt had to be changed when changing to another cartridge group, only the bolt head is replaced on the Sauer 404.

To disassemble the barrel, the forend must first be removed by unscrewing one screw with either a 5 mm hex key or the Sauer universal tool. To disassemble the barrel, three more screws need to be loosened, also using a 5 mm hex key. Finally, a lever needs to be pulled down 90 degrees to release the barrel, allowing change of chambering or a worn out barrel. The new barrel can be hand tightened, although SIG Sauer recommends tightening the three screws with torque of 5 Newtonmeters (about 45 inch pounds).

Some available factory chamberings are:

Medium (Standard)

- .243 Win, 6.5mm Creedmoor, 6.5×55mm, .270 Win, 7×64mm, .308 Win, .30-06 Springfield, 8x57 IS, 9.3×62mm

Magnum

- 7mm Rem Mag, .300 Win Mag, 8×68mm S, .338 Win Mag, .375 H&H Magnum, .404 Jeffery, 10.3x60 mmR Swiss

== See also ==
- Sauer 80/90
- Sauer 200
- SIG Sauer 200 STR
- Sauer 202
- Sauer 303
- SIG Sauer 205
