= SIG Sauer SSG 3000 =

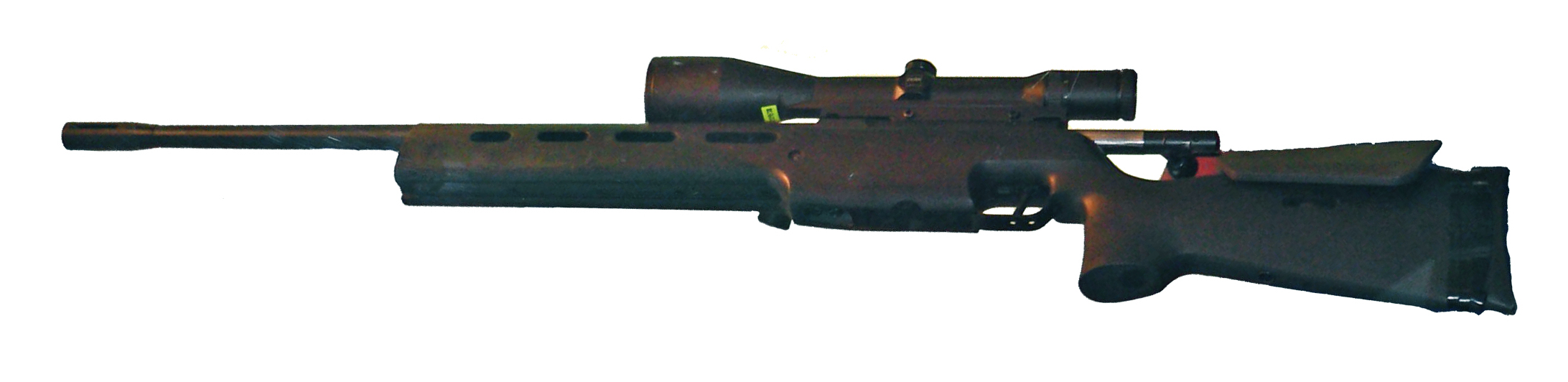
- A SIG Sauer SSG 3000 bolt action rifle fitted with a Zeiss Victory Diavari 3-12x56 telescopic sight with Zeiss inner rail.
- Type: Sniper rifle
- Place of origin: Germany

Service history
- Used by: See Users

Production history
- Manufacturer: SIG Sauer
- Produced: 1992–? (out of production)
- Variants: Patrol, Target, Supertarget

Specifications
- Mass: 5.44 kg (11.99 lb)
- Length: 1,180 mm (46.5 in)
- Barrel length: 600 mm (23.6 in)
- Width: 95 mm (3.7 in)
- Height: 152 mm (6.0 in)
- Cartridge: 7.62×51mm NATO
- Action: Bolt-action
- Muzzle velocity: 800 m/s (2,625 ft/s) - 830 m/s (2,723 ft/s)
- Effective firing range: 915 m (1,001 yd)
- Feed system: 5-round detachable internal magazine

The SIG Sauer SSG 3000 (Scharfschützengewehr 3000, literally Sharpshooter Rifle 3000) is a bolt-action, magazine fed rifle chambered in 7.62×51mm NATO. It was derived in Germany from the Sauer 200/Sauer 202 rifle family, that featured a modular construction allowing for easy replacement of components and changing between barrels with different chamberings. The SSG 3000 is a common law enforcement sniper rifle in both Europe and the United States. The rifle was developed by SIG Sauer GmbH and is well renowned for its high quality.

== Specifications ==
The SIG Sauer SSG 3000 comes in two barrel lengths, either 46 or 60 cm (18 or 23.5 inches). The Patrol models action is imported from Germany and mated to a USA made stock by SIG Sauer, NH. The SSG 3000 typically sold in the United States is known for having two stock options. The first stock was created by McMillan USA and is a robust fiberglass aluminum design. The second stock design is an aluminum bedded composite stock, of an OEM design.

Regardless of the country of final assembly, the SIG 3000 has the uncommon feature of a quick change barrel system. The barrel can be replaced in under 15 minutes by removing the stock and three screws using a 5 mm hex key, and then properly reinserting the new barrel and screws. The 6 lug bolt is dimensioned for short and medium action cartridges,. As the modular barrel-change system allows changing between chamberings there are several vendors that make drop-in replacement barrels mostly based on the short action chambering standard in 6mm Creedmoor, 6.5mm Creedmoor, .260 Remington (6.5-08 A-Square), 6.5×55mm (a medium action cartridge), .308 Winchester, and other chamberings.

== Users ==
- Argentina: Used by Grupo Albatros
- Brazil: Used by PMDF BOPE unit, naval infantry and Special Operations Brigade
- Chile: Used by Army of Chile
- China Used by People's Armed Police
- Colombia
- Czech Republic: Used by Police of the Czech Republic
- Egypt: Used by Unit 777
- El Salvador: Used by the National Civil Police.
- Hong Kong: Used by Special Duties Unit
- India: Used by Indian Armed Forces.
- Latvia: Supplied to the Latvian National Guard.
- Mexico: Used by Mexican Special Forces.
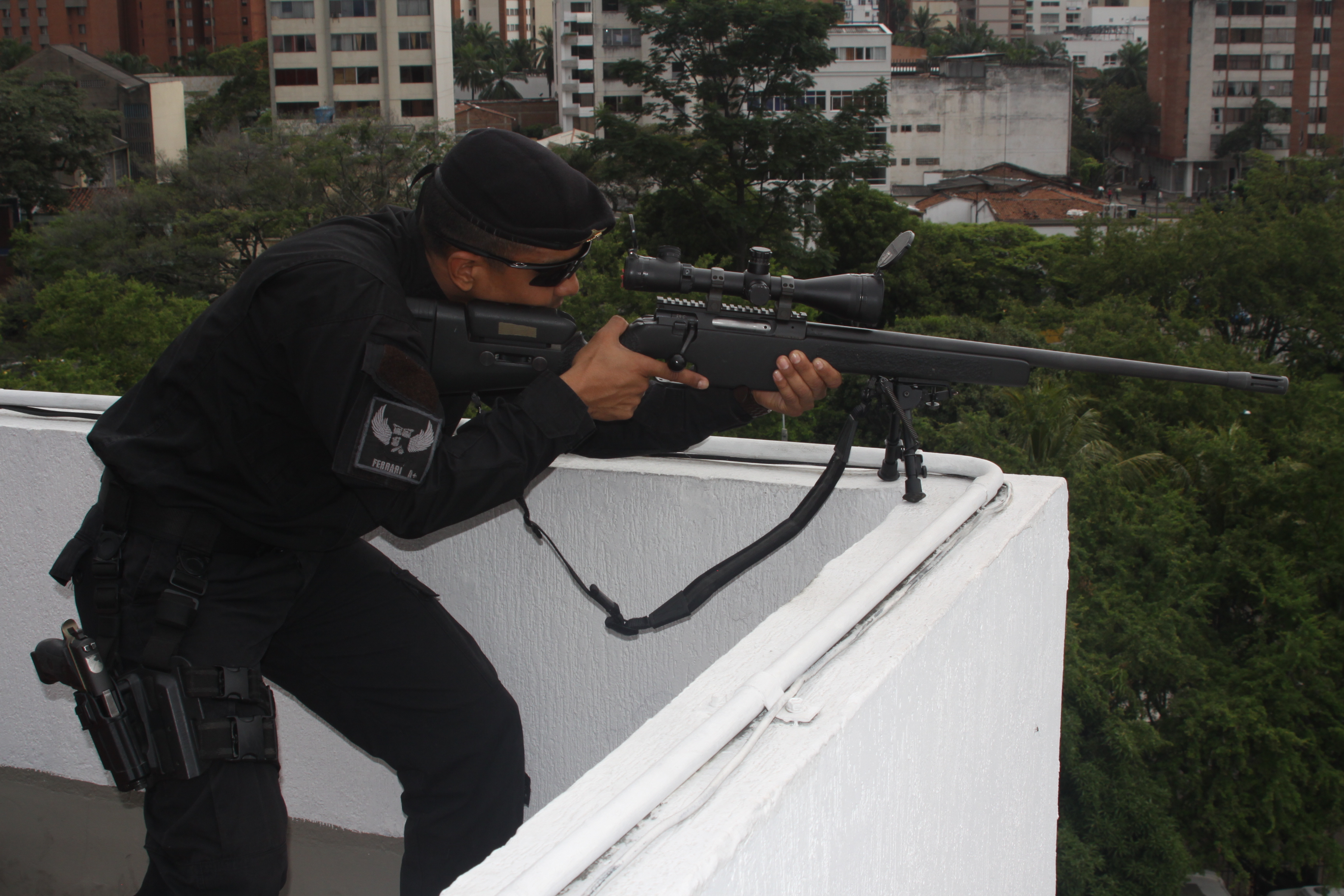
- Norway: Used by the Emergency Response Unit).
- Romania: Used by special forces
- Slovakia: Used by the Slovak Police Útvar Osobitného Určenia ("special assignments unit").
- South Korea: Used by the Republic of Korea Marine Corps.
- Sri Lanka: Used by Regiment Special Force
- Thailand: Used by Royal Thai Army
- Turkey: Used by Special Forces.

== See also ==
- SIG Sauer 200 STR
- SIG Sauer 205
- Sauer 404
