= Lynx Rifles =

Brand of high-end straight pull rifles

Pirkan ASE
- Industry: Firearms
- Founded: 1979; 47 years ago
- Founder: Torsti Laaksonen
- Key people: Harri Laaksonen
- Products: Rifles
- Website: lynxrifles.fi

Lynx Rifles is a brand of high-end straight pull rifles manufactured by Finnish firearms manufacturer Pirkan ASE both for the hunting, sport and tactical market. All rifles are handmade in Finland and feature a biathlon style cross bolt straight pull system consisting of relatively few parts.

== Models ==
The only current model is the Lynx 94 which was patented and introduced in 1994, and has been quoted as one of the "smoothest and most reliable straight-pull rifle[s] available". The rifle has been marketed outside Finland since 2007, and in 2014 67% of all production was exported. The Lynx 94 is available in either a short (.223 length), medium (.308 length) or long (.30-06 length) action to suit different cartridges ranging from .222 Rem to .375 Ruger. The receiver and barrel can be delivered in either a blued or stainless finish.

Model designations depend mainly on stock and barrel configuration as follows:

TD15
Takedown stock (synthetic or walnut) to make travelling easier. The stock of this particular model is split into different parts, with a milled aluminium block in the middle connecting the buttstock, handguard and barreled action.
Light Hunter
Lightweight barrel configuration and walnut stock.
Target
Heavy barrel and a laminated thumbhole stock for increased precision and weather stability. The stock also has an adjustable cheekpiece for height and cant, and two UIT rails for attaching a bipod and a sling.
English
Lightweight barrel configuration with a made-to-order English style walnut stock.
Presence 15
Chassis stock equipped with a handguard with picatinny rails, AR 15 style buttstock and grip, and AICS style magazines.

The 94 action itself has a tubular design with a sliding crossbar. To provide a shorter bolt travel, the two locking lugs are located at the rear of the action, and are directly opposed on the left and right side. For mounting of a scope sight, the action features an integral 17 mm wide dovetail rail. Trigger pull weight can be adjusted between 500 and 1200 grams. The barrel is attached to the receiver using traditional action threads.

== See also ==
- List of straight pull rifles
- BMS Cam rifle
- Blaser R8
- Heym SR 30
- Mauser M1996 / Rößler Titan 16
