= SIG Sauer SSG 2000 =

Type of Sniper rifle

- Type: Sniper rifle
- Place of origin: Germany; Switzerland

Service history
- Used by: See Users

Production history
- Manufacturer: SIG Sauer
- Produced: 1989– (out of production)

Specifications
- Mass: 6.6 kg empty with scope
- Length: 1210 mm
- Barrel length: 610 mm
- Cartridge: 7.62×51mm NATO.300 Winchester Magnum; 7.5×55mm Swiss
- Action: Bolt-action
- Effective firing range: 1000 m 7.62×51mm NATO; 1100 m .300 Winchester Magnum; 1000 m 7.5×55mm Swiss
- Feed system: 4-round detachable box magazine
- Sights: non-fitted, but telescopic day or night optics can be fitted.

The SIG Sauer SSG 2000 (Scharfschützengewehr 2000, literally Sharpshooter Rifle 2000) is a bolt-action, magazine-fed rifle.

== Service use ==
The SSG 2000 sniper rifle is a joint effort by Swiss company SIG Arms (now SIG Sauer AG) and German company J.P.Sauer & Sohn. Production of the SSG 2000 started in 1989. In 1992, it was succeeded by the SSG 3000, although both models were produced concurrently for a period.

== Description ==
The SSG 2000 is derived from the Sauer 80/90 target rifle. It has a bolt action with rotating handle, but non-rotating bolt. When the handle is rotated to close the action, six lugs are driven onwards from the rear part of the bolt body to lock into the receiver. The action also features a loaded chamber indicator. The heavy barrel is hammer-forged and has a flash hider/muzzle brake unit installed. The wooden stock is adjustable. The trigger is two-stage.

The SSG 2000 has no iron sights by default and is usually fitted with Schmidt & Bender X1.5-6×42 variable-power or Zeiss Diatal ZA 8×56T fixed-power telescope sight.

== Users ==
- Taiwan

== See also ==
- Sauer 80
- SIG Sauer SSG 3000
