= Rößler (firearms manufacturer) =

Rößler Waffen GmbH
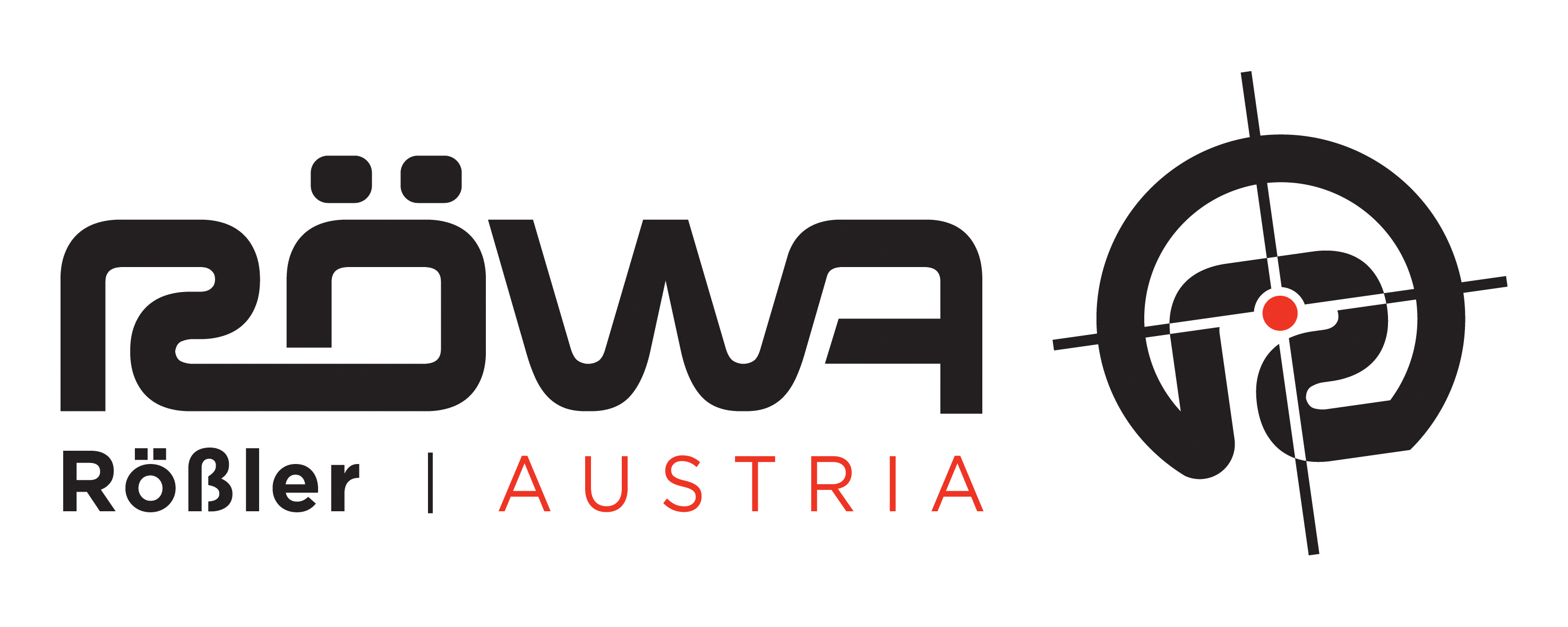
- Industry: Firearms
- Founded: 1996; 30 years ago
- Founder: Erich Rößler
- Headquarters: Kufstein (Tyrol), Austria
- Key people: Walter Rößler
- Products: Rifles
- Website: titan6.com

Rößler, sometimes written Roessler, is an Austrian firearms manufacturer of high-end rifles both for the hunting, sport and tactical market.

The company's Titan 3, 6, 16 and Alpha models feature a lock time of 1.6 milliseconds.

== History ==
Company founder Erich Rößler was born in 1948 in Amstetten, Lower Austria, and started his education at the national college for handguns in Ferlach at the age of 15 years. After his education and at the age of 21 he was employed by a firearms manufacturer. In 1996 Erich started his own company where he produced custom made and small batch orders of single shot rifles, shotgun rifles and Bergstutzen. Due to high demand Walter Rößler, the son of Erich Rößler, quickly joined the company. The company wished to develop a mass-produced high end bolt action hunting rifle, which resulted in the first prototype of the Titan 6 rifle being tested in November 2001, and the model was introduced to the international market in March 2002.

== Products ==
All current models feature a quick barrel change system requiring only a hex key, making them modular firearms.

- Titan 3: Bolt action with three locking lugs, available in calibers such as .222 Rem, .223Rem, 5,6×50 Mag, .300 Whisper, .22-250 Rem, 6mm BR and 7.62×39mm.
- Titan 6: Bolt action with six locking lugs, available in calibers such as 6.5×55mm, .308 Win, .30-06 Springfield and 9.3×62mm.
- Titan 16: Straight-pull rifle introduced in 2012 at the IWA show. Available in calibers from .243 Win to .375 Ruger. Based on the Mauser M1996.
- Titan Alpha: Bolt action with three locking lugs. A lightweight and more affordable option compared to the Titan 3 and 6, and available in fewer calibers.

== See also ==
- BMS Cam rifle
- Blaser R8
- Lynx 94
- Heym SR 30
