= Schultz & Larsen Legacy =

Bolt action rifle

Schultz & Larsen Legacy is a bolt action rifle manufactured by Schultz & Larsen in Denmark. The receiver is blued, and has integrated mounts for Schultz & Larsen's own "Slide & Lock" sight mounting system. The receiver is also drilled and tapped for installation of other scope mount bases (with 22 mm distance between the screw holes and a 15 mm radius on the receiver bridge).

S&L supplies Picatinny rail bases with 0, 3 or 6 milliradian tilt. The trigger is adjustable, has a 3-position safety selector, and can be emptied with the safety on. The Legacy is delivered from the factory chambered for .222 Rem, .223 Rem, 6×45 mm or 7.62×35 mm (.300 BLK/.300 Whisper). The barrel has cut rifling, and can be swapped using a hex key. The barrels are not interchangeable with other Schultz & Larsen rifle models such as the Classic and Victory. The Legacy was originally launched as a right-hand model only.

== See also ==
- Sako Vixen
- Howa 1500 Mini Action
