= Sauer 90 =

German bolt action rifle

Sauer 80, 90, 92
- Type: Repeating rifle
- Place of origin: Germany

Production history
- Produced: 1973-2006

Specifications
- Mass: 3.5 kg
- Length: 590-650 mm (barrel)
- Cartridge: Several, see below.
- Action: Bolt action
- Sights: Open sights, or prepared for scope mount

Sauer 80, 90 and 92 are bolt-action rifles using a non-rotating bolt with rear-locking lugs expanded against matching lugs inside the rear of the action by rotating the bolt handle down. The rifle is known for having a relatively short and smooth bolt travel and is considered technically more complicated than the “Gold Standard” Mauser 98 bolt action. The early European and Colt models had a complicated trigger mechanism and this was later changed in production to a standard shotgun single-set trigger for simplicity and familiarity of use.

In Europe the rifle was originally sold under the name Sauer 80. The rifle was sold in USA as Sauer Colt from 1973 to 1985, and Browning had a special model with steel panels between 1979 and 1984. Sauer 90 and 92 were later and updated models only sold in Europe, with the main changes being related to the trigger guard and stock.

Sauer 80 was designed in 1970 and introduced to the market in 1972. Sauer 90 was released in 1982. Sauer 90 and 92 were produced until 2006.

After the Swedish rifle company Husquarna/Carl Gustaf for a while stopped producing civilian rifles, they decided to import finished and semi-finished rifles from Sauer. A variant of Sauer 80 was therefore produced in Sweden under the name Carl Gustaf 3000 (M.3000 or CG 3000). They were very similar to the original, but with a few differences in for instance the stock and scope mounts. Most of the rifle was made in Germany, while the barrel and final assembly was done in Sweden. All receivers were made in Germany, and the Carl Gustaf rifles therefore had house marks from Sauer. The Lux editions of CG 3000 were built completely by Sauer in Eckernförde, Germany, while the standard versions were assembled in Sweden using receivers made by Sauer, barrels from Carl Gustaf and MonteCarlo stocks from Sweden.

== Technical ==
The rifle is known for having very good precision, and has been used by hunters and sport shooters, and also in a sniper version known as SIG Sauer SSG 2000 by police and defense forces.

For being a hunting rifle, the Sauer 80/90 is known for having a somewhat high weight compared to competing models.

=== Stock ===
The rifle was delivered with different types of wood stocks, and especially the German stocks were known for having a high quality. The safety is conveniently placed on the tang of the stock, but little wood in this area makes it a weak spot which is known for breaking if the rifle falls. The rifle is also known for being difficult to glass bed due to the shapes of the recoil lug and barrel nut, as well as ensuring that the magazine is seated correctly.

=== Trigger ===
The trigger has a special construction built on rollers. It is known for being complicated and sensitive to dirt, and needs regular cleaning to avoid misfires. The rifle was also sold with a set trigger which could be activated by pushing the trigger forward.

=== Bolt ===
The bolt has a lift of 60 degrees, making the rifle easier to operate with a scope sight mounted. There is a button on the bolt allowing the rifle to be emptied with the safety engaged.

Three massive flapper locking "lugs", or struts, can be found on the rear of the bolt. Rear locking ensures a shorter bolt travel, but also makes the brass case (as well as the receiver, but with modern metallurgy it's strong enough to not influence anything) stretch considerably more during firing. This gives more wear on the spent casings, and the brass can therefore not be reloaded near as many times as with more conventional rifles with locking lugs on the front end of the bolt (which wasn't initially seen as an issue since the gun was marketed in the upper segment for well-off buyers who don't reload their ammunition).

It is known that the bolt recesses should be cleaned regularly to avoid stoppages. Due to the rear locking lugs, the precision of the rifle is also known to be very sensitive to oil or water entering the chamber, even more so than the Krag–Jørgensen.

=== Receiver ===
The Sauer 80/90/92's and the Lux variant of CG 3000 have an empty chamber bolt hold open mechanism and a steel bottom metal. The standard edition of CG 3000 has an aluminium bottom metal and lacks an empty chamber bolt hold open.

The receiver was produced in four variants. The different receivers (and some of the different calibers) used different types of single stack magazines.

Short action
.222 Rem, .22-250, .243 Win and .308 Win.

Medium action
.25-06 Rem, .270 Win .30-06.

Magnum action
7mm Rem Mag, .300 Win, .300 Wby Mag and .375 H&H.

Safari magnum
Only in .458 Win Mag.

The rarest caliber chamberings for the Colt Sauer are .22-250 in short action, .25-06 in medium action and .375 H&H in the magnum action.

The SSG2000 was chambered in .223 Rem, .308 Win, 7.5×55mm, .300 Win Mag and .300 Weatherby Magnum

=== Barrel ===
The Sauer 80/90 barrel mounting differs from traditional action threads. While the barrel does indeed have threads, it is headspaced using a separate hex key. This way the barrel can be changed using only simple hand tools, eliminating the need for a vise and an action wrench. This mechanism can be seen as a forerunner of the barrel change system later introduced in Sauer 200, SIG Sauer 202 and 200 STR.

Original replacement barrels can be difficult to find.

== See also ==
- SIG Sauer SSG 2000
- Krag–Jørgensen
- Husqvarna 1900
- Carl Gustaf 2000
- Remington Model 7600

== Eksterne lenker ==
- Sauer 90 Jungjägerfragen - Lutz Möller Geschichte
