= Modular weapon system =

Firearm reconfigurable for various applications

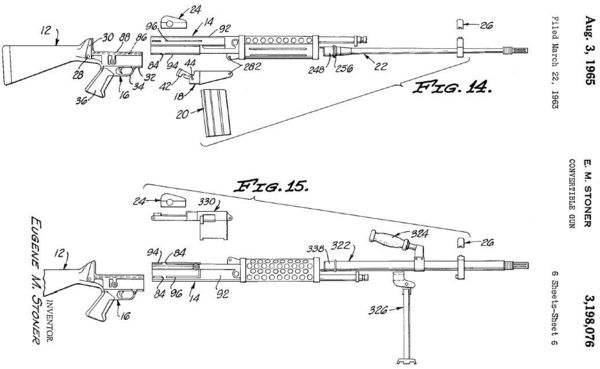
Drawing of Stoner 63 modular weapon system

A modular weapon system (MWS) is any weapon equipment which has removable core components (or "modules") that can be reconfigured/interchanged to give the weapon different capabilities to adapt to various applications. Modularity can provide several advantages to military organizations, such as the versatility of allowing units to quickly tailor their weapons to best suit the immediate tactical needs, to quickly repair/exchange malfunctioned components, and to reduce overall logistical burdens and costs. However, it also make the legal tracking and technical categorization of a weapon more complicated as it can now be easily converted into a diverse variety of different forms.

For example, the Stoner 63 is a 5.56×45mm NATO-caliber modular small arm system using a variety of modular components, which can be configured as a rifle, a carbine, a top-fed light machine gun, a belt-fed squad automatic weapon, or a vehicle mounted weapon.

A modular firearm can also be useful for hunters, which then easily can change to a different chambering or barrel length when hunting different species.

== Quick-change barrel system ==
Another example of a modular firearm system is the increasingly popular quick barrel change systems, which is found on some new rifles like for example the Blaser R8, Roessler Titan and SIG Sauer 200 STR. These systems simplify the replacement of worn barrels or caliber changes, since they often only require the use of a hex key, thus eliminating the need for special tools and custom fitting by a gunsmith.

== See also ==
- Glossary of firearms terms
- Action threads
- Press fit barrel
