= Sauer 303 =

Sauer 303 Rifle Series
- Type: Semi-automatic rifle

Service history
- In service: 2006

Production history
- Designer: J.P. Sauer & Sohn
- Designed: 2006
- Manufacturer: J.P. Sauer & Sohn

Specifications
- Mass: 3.25 kg (7.2 lb) to 3.35 kg (7.4 lb)
- Length: 1,065 mm (41.9 in) to 115 mm (4.5 in)
- Barrel length: 510 mm (20 in) or 560 mm (22 in)
- Caliber: 7x64mm, .308 Win, .30-06, .300 Win Mag, 8x57mm IS, .338 Win Mag, 9.3x62mm
- Feed system: 2 Round, Optional 5 Round magazine

The Sauer 303 is a semi-automatic rifle line available in calibers from 7x64mm to 9.3x62mm.

The J. P. Sauer & Sohn company is a manufacturer of very high quality firearms and partnered with SIG (now Swiss Arms) in 1975 to create the Swiss/German based SIG Sauer company which is parent of the US based SIG Sauer. Like Swiss Arms, and SIG Sauer, J.P. Sauer & Sohn is also owned by de:L&O Holding
