= SIG Sauer 200 STR =

Sauer 200 STR
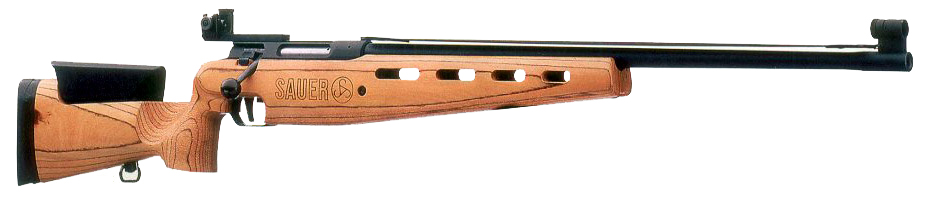
- STR 200 MATCH rifle
- Type: Bolt-action repeating rifle
- Place of origin: Germany

Production history
- Designer: SIG Sauer
- Manufacturer: J. P. Sauer & Sohn GmbH
- Variants: STR 200 RECRUIT (.22 Long Rifle); STR 200 JUNIOR (6.5×55mm); STR 200 JUNIOR (.22 Long Rifle); STR 200 MATCH (6.5×55mm, .308 Winchester, .22 Long Rifle)

Specifications
- Mass: 5,428 g (11.967 lb) (700 mm barrel)
- Length: 1,185 mm (46.7 in) (700 mm barrel)
- Barrel length: 670 mm (26.4 in) (6.5×55mm); 700 mm (27.6 in) (6.5×55mm); 740 mm (29.1 in) (6.5×55mm)
- Width: 102 mm (4.0 in)
- Height: 223 mm (8.8 in)
- Cartridge: 6.5×55mm.308 Winchester/7.62×51mm NATO.22 Long Rifle
- Action: Bolt-action
- Muzzle velocity: 7 g Scenar 959 m/s (700 mm barrel); 8 g Scenar 902 m/s (700 mm barrel); 9 g Scenar 854 m/s (700 mm barrel)
- Effective firing range: Used in field shooting competitions out to 600 meters
- Feed system: 5-round box magazine
- Sights: Barrel mounted globe sight. 11 mm dovetail rail on receiver for mounting diopter rear sight, or a scope sight, either directly or via a picatinny rail adapter

The SIG Sauer 200 STR (Scandinavian target rifle), also known as the SIG Sauer 200 STR Match, is a bolt-action rifle mostly used as a target/competition rifle for national competitions by Norwegian, Swedish and Danish sport shooters. It is a variant of the Sauer 200 TR or SIG Sauer 200 TR Match rifle that features thicker 19 mm (0.75 in) diameter barrels. The 200 STR is produced by J. P. Sauer & Sohn GmbH in Germany.

The Sauer 200 STR rifle has a factory warranty of 15 years, exempting the use of overpressure (handloaded) ammunition—the 6.5×55mm P_{max} piezo pressure is set at 380 MPa (55,114 psi) and the .308 Winchester/7.62×51mm NATO P_{max} piezo pressure is set at 415 MPa (60,191 psi) by Sauer & Sohn following the relevant C.I.P. rulings.

== Design details ==
Due to the Sauer 200 STR modular design, barrel, chambering, and trigger groups can be relatively easily changed by the user with the help of simple tools. The rifle stocks are however factory fitted to a particular rifle, so stocks can not be easily exchanged between rifles. Also available are .22 Long Rifle conversion kits and genuine left-hand versions for all chamberings.

=== Bolt action ===
The Sauer 200 STR is a bolt action sport rifle based on the Sauer 200 receiver introduced in 1985. This receiver is CNC machined out of a single piece of steel and has been designed for maximum stability and is also used in several other Sauer rifle variants like the SIG-Sauer SSG 3000 and, slightly modified, in the 21st century Sauer 202. Tight manufacturing tolerances, a high quality surface finish and non protruding locking lugs are the basis for "smooth" bolt action manipulation. The bolt has six lugs that lock directly into the barrel. This construction prevents that bolt thrust forces act directly to the receiver that encloses the cartridge with a radial collar that, in conjunction with a gas relief hole intended for pressure relieve during catastrophic ammunition failures, contributes to strength and safety. Further the rifle features a relatively lightweight firing pin resulting in a lock time of 2.4 milliseconds. The bolt knob uses M6 threads, enabling the use of aftermarket bolt knobs.

=== Barrel ===
The 200 STR chromium molybdenum (CrMo) steel hammer forged match barrels have a 19 mm (0.75 in) end diameter.

=== Trigger ===
The 200 STR has a two-stage trigger mechanism with an adjustable trigger pull of approximately 13–17 N (1.3–1.7 kg_{f}; 2.9–3.8 lb_{f}). The trigger can also be adjusted for length, horizontal and vertical pitch. The advantage of these features is to prevent trigger movement in an inappropriate direction that would cause the rifle to move off target. A lighter 500 gram trigger is also available.

=== Safety ===
The rifle has an external manual safety to help to prevent accidental discharges. When the rifle is ready to fire a visible indicator at the rear of the receiver warns the user for this condition.

=== Sights ===
For sighting the rifle features a diopter and globe sighting line mounted on dove tails. The factory SIG Sauer diopter can be adjusted in 0.1 mil (10 mm at 100 m) increments and features 100–600 m sight markings. The sight height through the factory diopter is 33.5 mm (1.32 in). Due to use of standard sized dove tails other more precisely adjustable diopters can be fitted. The rifle also features a mirage band to aid sighting over a warmed up barrel.

=== Stock ===
The 200 STR has a laminated beechwood stock featuring an adjustable cheek piece and shoulder pad. These adjustment options allow shooters of various sizes and shapes to tailor the stock to their personal preferences. An aluminium UIT rail is integrated in the underside of the front of the stock, which can be used for attaching a sling or bipod.

== Scandinavian target rifle use ==
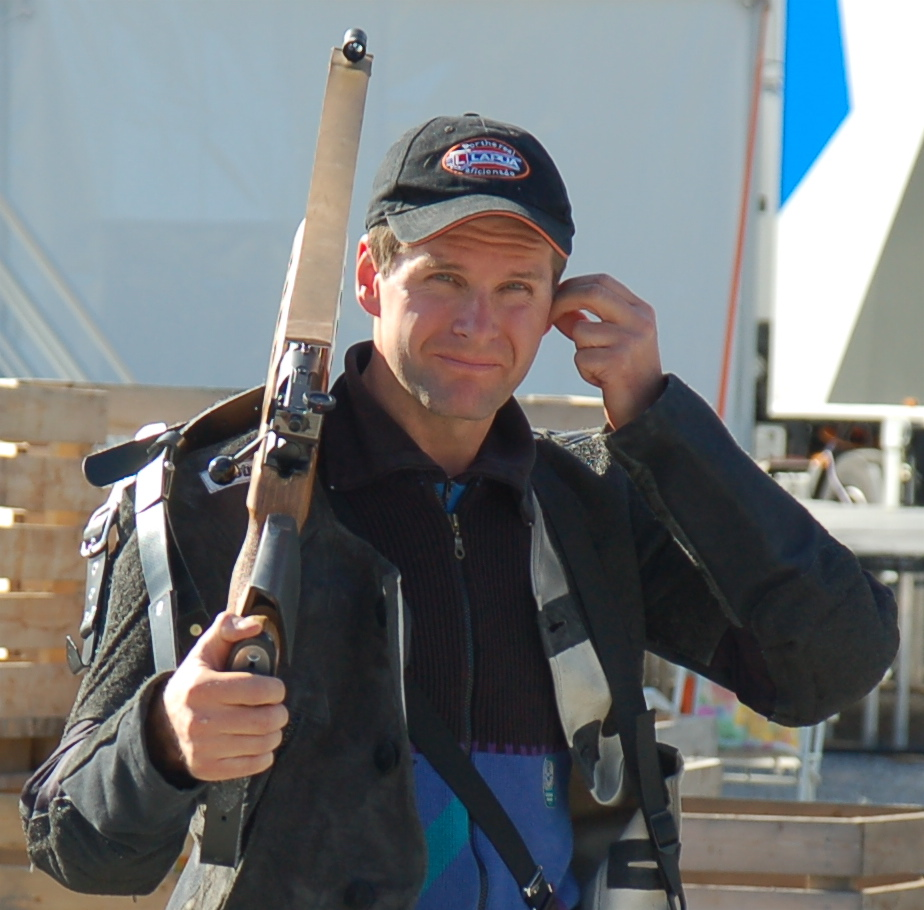
Espen Berg-Knutsen at Landsskytterstevnet in 2007 with a left handed Sauer 200 STR featuring a mirage band

The Sauer 200 STR rifle was approved for use by the Norwegian Voluntarily National Rifle Association Det frivillige Skyttervesen (DFS) from 1. January 1990 in the 6.5×55mm, .308 Winchester/7.62×51mm NATO and .22 Long Rifle chamberings.

These three Scandinavian national shooting organizations strive to keep the costs of participating in their shooting events reasonable, so their rulings restrict the use of very expensive highly specialized target rifles by allowing only the use of their respective (historic) military service rifles and the Sauer 200 STR target/competition rifle.

In competition events the .22 Long Rifle chambering is used for short range shooting events at 50 m (55 yd) and field shooting events up to 100 m (109 yd). The 6.5×55mm chambering - which in the 19th and 20th century was used by Norway and Sweden as their military service chambering - is used by Norwegian, Swedish and Danish sport shooters for shooting events at 200 m (219 yd), 300 m (328 yd), field shooting events up to 600 m (656 yd) and rapid-fire orientated Stangskyting events.

=== History ===
Before the Scandinavian target rifle, the Scandinavian shooting associations had a need to replace their various aging standard rifles. The rifles then in use at that time were:

- Used in Norway: Norwegian Krag–Jørgensen, and various rebuilt Mauser K98k actions, such as the Kongsberg KV59, M67
- Used in Sweden: Swedish Mauser, in variants such as CG-63, CG-73/CG-74, CG-80 and FSR89
- Used in Denmark: Danish Krag–Jørgensen and various rebuilt Mauser K98k actions, such as the Schultz & Larsen M52, M58 and M69.

Early in the 1980s, the Norwegian association had the lowest supply of M98 actions needed to build their current rifle models, with a supply expected to suffice for 6-8 years of production. The Norwegians took initiative to meet with the other Scandinavian rifle associations to consider finding a common ground for coming precision rifles to be used within the three organizations. The Swedish and Danish associations estimated they had enough supply Mauser M96 and M98 actions respectively to sustain themselves until around year 2000, but nonetheless joined the process. One alternative considered was to adopt a set of standard rifle rules, akin to those used internationally in UIT standard rifle, which would have allowed competitors to use any rifle within certain limitations. However, the Scandinavian rifle associations early decided to instead choose a single rifle model in order to make the sport accessible by keeping costs down.

In January 1983 it was announced that the three associations had conducted a meeting discussing a common Nordic standard rifle. Subsequently, an open competition was held where amongst others Heckler & Koch, Mauser, Steyr, Winchester and SIG Sauer delivered candidates. Some of the requirements were that the rifle would be suited for both Nordic bullseye and field shooting, would have a maximum weight of 5.5 kg, and have sufficient precision to produce ten round groups of less than 100 mm at 300 meters (0.33 mrad; 1 moa) using factory ammunition. The first test in the competition was held in July 1984, and consisted of 16 models from in total 13 manufacturers in 7 countries. The first test was conducted by 11 Swedish shooters and gunsmiths. In Sweden, sales numbers fell sharply for the newest Swedish standard rifle Carl Gustaf CG-80, with most shooters holding onto their older CG-63 rifles while waiting for the results of the Nordic standard rifle trials. The second test was conducted in Sweden in May 1985, this time with five participating shooters from each of the three countries Norway, Sweden and Denmark. The number of firearm candidates had now been reduced to 13, namely offered by Norwegian companies Eriks Våpenteknikk, Kongsberg Våpenfabrikk, German companies Mauser, Sauer & Sohn, Heym and Krico, American company Remington, Danish company Schultz & Larsen, Finnish company Tikka, Austrian company Steyr Mannlicher, and Swedish companies FFV, Lano and Erress. Among the models considered were Steyr SSG 69, Mauser M86, what would later become the Sauer 200 STR and Sauer 205, and KV IRG-M85 with magazine wells on its sides. A prototype of the IRG-M85 today is displayed at the museum of Kongsberg Våpenfabrikk. After an evaluation in September 1985 the 6 best rifles were selected for the next test round in Copenhagen in the summer of 1986. In the meantime a winter test was conducted in the winter of 1985/86. The last test was a winter test in Norway in the winter of 1986/87.

On the 4 December 1987 the commission gathered in Copenhagen, and chose the Sauer 200 STR as the new Nordic standard rifle, after changes to the stock material and some other technical details. Sauer had thus won the competition with a concept that allowed the user to perform most of the maintenance themselves without needing a gunsmith. The first production rifles were delivered in 1989, and the rifle became approved for competitions in all three organizations starting 1 January 1990.

Between 2005 and 2015, the DFS tested the Sauer 200 STR rifle in the 5.56×45mm NATO chambering, since this is the new service cartridge the Norwegian Army has adopted. In 2015 the DFS decided not to introduce the 5.56×45mm NATO as a chambering for their shooting events. The 200 STR rifle is also approved by the sister organizations of the DFS, the Swedish Volunteer Sharpshooting Movement Frivilliga Skytterörelsen (FSR) that merged in 2009 into the Svenska Skyttesportförbundet and the Danish De Danske Skytteforeninger (DDS) for use in their shooting events.

== Nordic field biathlon use ==
It is also used in Nordic field biathlon within Det frivillige Skyttervesen (DFS). The sport is considered a close predecessor to Olympic biathlon, with the main difference being the use of fullbore rifles and paper targets placed in the terrain with time penalties added for misses.

== Variants ==
Besides the several variants of the Sauer 200 STR rifle several other variants of the basic rifle are available.

A special Sauer 200 sport shooting variant is a single shot version chambered for 6mm Norma BR. The 6mm Norma BR has become a popular chambering in match rifles used in 300 metres (328 yd) ISSF and CISM and other 300 metres rifle disciplines.

The rifle is also produced in the SIG-Sauer SSG 3000 sniper rifle variant. Unlike the match rifles the SIG-Sauer SSG 3000 sniper rifle is intended to be fitted with a telescopic sight, uses more weatherproof stocks and features some other accessories.

== See also ==
- SIG Sauer 202
- SIG Sauer 205
- SIG Sauer 404
