= Sauer 202 =

- Type: Bolt-action repeating rifle
- Place of origin: Germany

Production history
- Designer: SIG Sauer
- Manufacturer: J. P. Sauer & Sohn GmbH
- Variants: Avantgarde Grande/Classic Lux, Classic, Classic II, Classic XT, Elegance, Hardwood, Highland, Forest, GTI, LE/SO, Outback, Polar, Synchro XT, Takedown, Wild Boar, Wolverine, XT, Youkon

Specifications
- Length: 110 cm
- Cartridge: Several, see below
- Action: Bolt-action
- Sights: 61 cm

The Sauer 202 is a lightweight bolt-action rifle manufactured by Sauer & Sohn in Germany between 1993 and 2015. The rifle was imported to the US by SIG Arms. This rifle has a modular construction which allowed easy replacement of components and caliber changes. This rifle has a modular barrel-change system allows to change between calibers easily, and was offered in a large selection of calibers.

Separate magnum receivers and barrels were made which were not interchangeable with non-magnum calibers.

== Receiver ==
The standard receiver is made out of steel, but there is also a lightweight version available made of aluminium which weighs 470 grams less.

== Barrel change system ==
The standard 202 system uses the same receiver for mini and short action cartridges, but different types of bolts. The bolts for mini length cartridges (like .223) uses three lugs, while most short action cartridges (i.e. .308) uses six lug bolts. The four main types of bolts and some of their factory calibers are:

Mini action cartridges, using a 3 lug bolt

- .222 Remington and .223 Remington (both 9.6 mm rim)

Some short action cartridges, using a 3 lug bolt

- .22-250 Remington and .243 Winchester (both 12 mm rim)

Some short and medium action cartridges, using a 6 lug bolt

- 6.5x55 (12.2 mm rim)
- .25-06 Remington, .270 Winchester, .308 Winchester, .30-06 Springfield (all 12 mm rim)
- 7x64mm Brenneke and 8x57mm IS (both 11.95 mm rim)
- 9.3x62mm (11.93 mm rim)

Magnum calibers, using a 6 lug bolt

- 7mm Remington Magnum and .300 Winchester Magnum (both 13.5 mm rim)

The magnum version uses a different receiver than the standard version, and some parts can not normally be interchanged between standard and magnum caliber versions. For example, the barrel tenon on the magnum receiver is larger, meaning that barrels can not be swapped between the standard and magnum receivers.

The barrel can be changed using a 5 mm hex key.

== See also ==
- SIG Sauer 200 STR
- SIG Sauer 205
- Sauer 404
