= Sauer 200 =

German bolt action rifle

- Type: Repeating rifle
- Place of origin: Sauer & Sohn Eckernförde Germany

Production history
- Produced: 1984-1993
- Variants: Standard, Lux, European Lux, American Lux

Specifications
- Length: 60-66 cm (barrel length)
- Cartridge: Several, i.e. .270 Win, 6.5×55mm
- Action: Bolt action

Sauer 200 is a bolt action rifle introduced by SIG Sauer in 1984 and produced until 1993. The rifle was one of the first consumer rifles with easily replaceable barrels. Sauer 200 has also been sold in Scandinavia under the name Carl Gustaf CG 4000.

In 1993, Sauer 200 was replaced by its SIG Sauer 202. The two rifles have many similarities, and for example, barrels are interchangeable.

The rifle SIG Sauer 200 STR, which is the standard firearm within Det frivillige Skyttervesen, is partly based on Sauer 200.

== See also ==
- Sauer 90
- Husqvarna 1900
