= 9.3×62mm =

Rifle cartridge

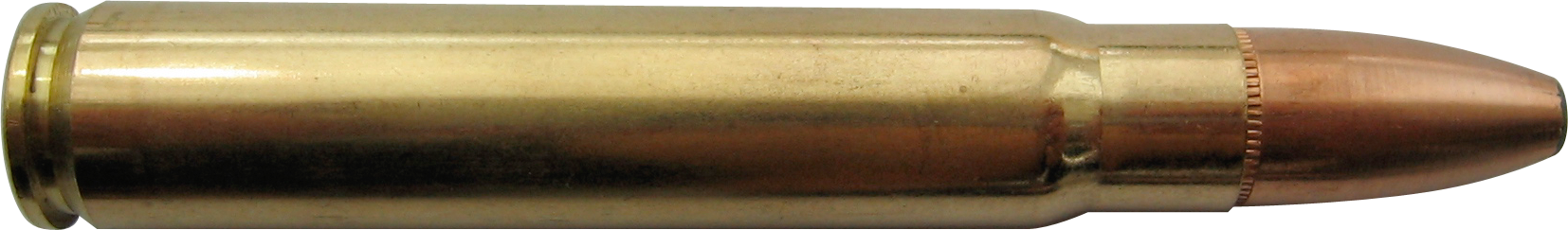
- 9.3×62mm cartridge (Norma Oryx 15g)
- Type: Rifle
- Place of origin: German Empire

Production history
- Designer: Otto Bock
- Designed: 1905
- Produced: 1905–present

Specifications
- Case type: Rimless, bottleneck
- Bullet diameter: 9.30 mm (0.366 in)
- Neck diameter: 9.92 mm (0.391 in)
- Shoulder diameter: 11.45 mm (0.451 in)
- Base diameter: 12.10 mm (0.476 in)
- Rim diameter: 11.95 mm (0.470 in)
- Rim thickness: 1.30 mm (0.051 in)
- Case length: 62.00 mm (2.441 in)
- Overall length: 83.60 mm (3.291 in)
- Case capacity: 5.07 cm^{3} (78.2 gr H_{2}O)
- Rifling twist: 360 mm (1-14.17 in)
- Primer type: Large rifle
- Maximum pressure: 390.00 MPa (56,565 psi)

Ballistic performance
Bullet mass/type	Velocity	Energy
230 gr (15 g) Norma Ecostrike	2,641 ft/s (805 m/s)	3,563 ft⋅lbf (4,831 J)
232 gr (15 g) Norma Oryx	2,625 ft/s (800 m/s)	3,551 ft⋅lbf (4,815 J)
275 gr (18 g) Norma Solid	2,450 ft/s (750 m/s)	3,666 ft⋅lbf (4,970 J)
285 gr (18 g) Norma Oryx	2,362 ft/s (720 m/s)	3,544 ft⋅lbf (4,805 J)
286 gr (19 g) Swift A-Frame	2,362 ft/s (720 m/s)	3,544 ft⋅lbf (4,805 J)
- Test barrel length: 610 millimetres (24 in); Source: Norma

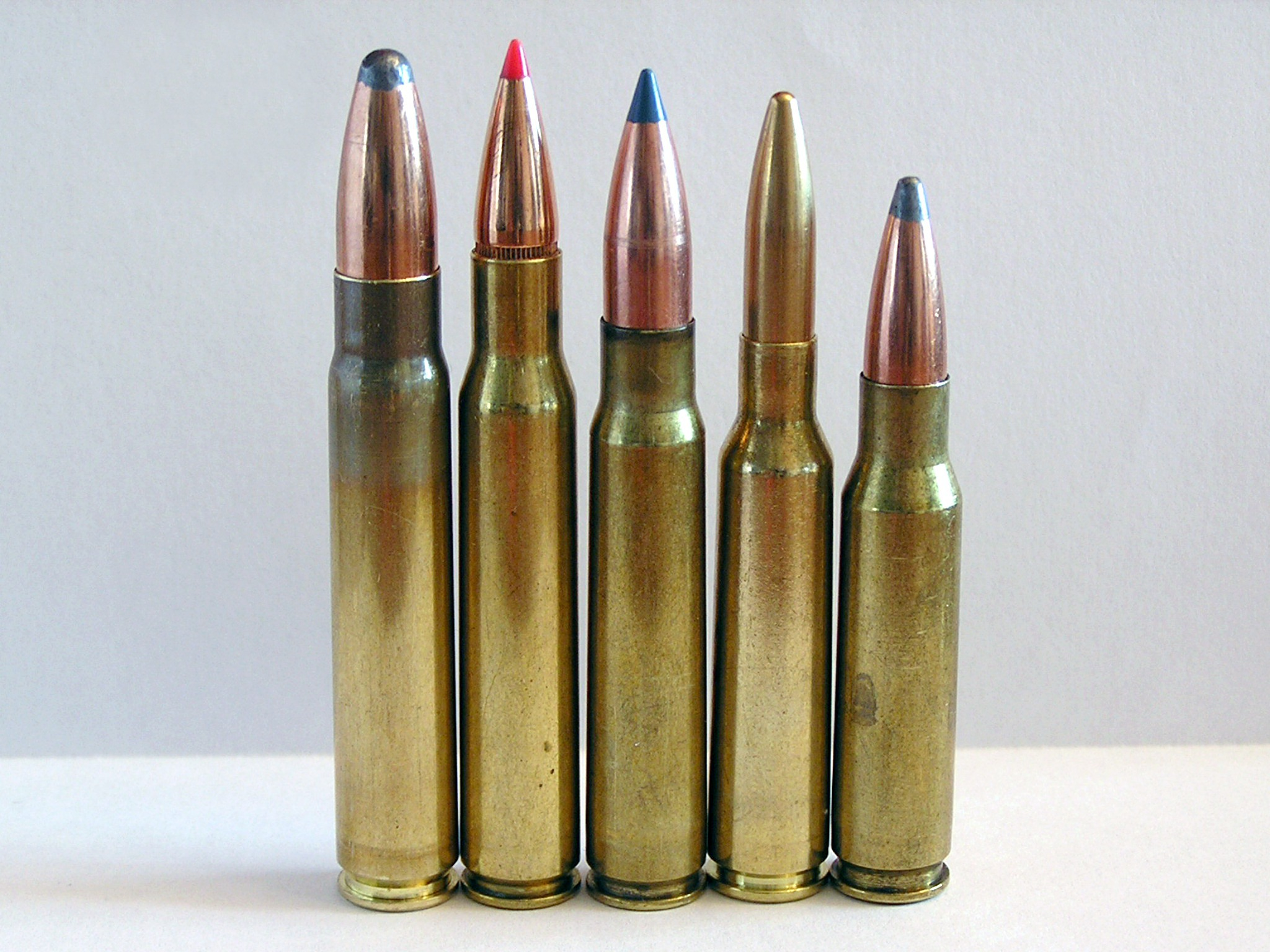
From left to right 9.3×62mm, .30-06 Springfield, 8mm Mauser, 6.5×55mm and .308 Winchester cartridges.

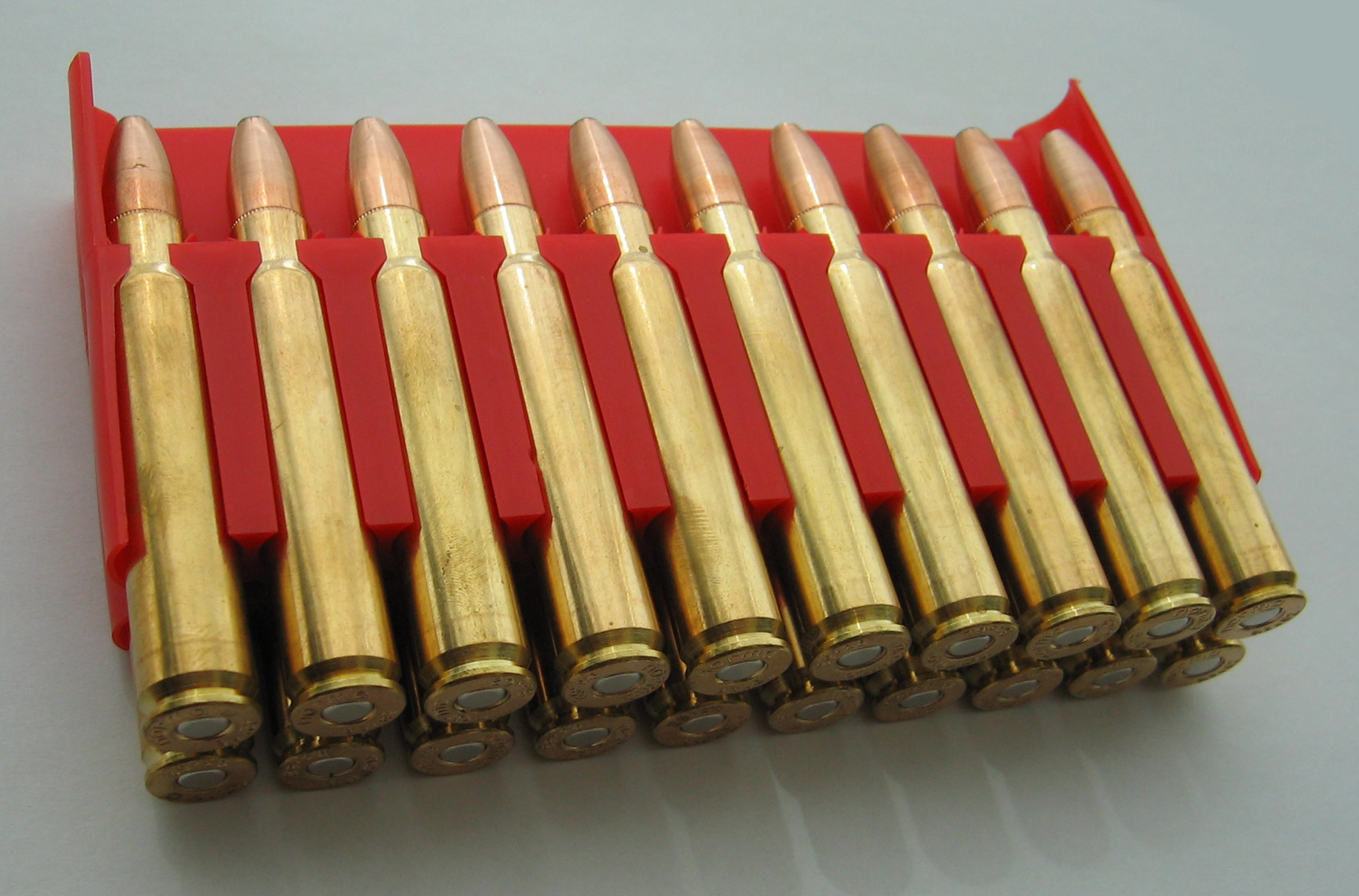
Norma Oryx Soft Point cartridges in plastic holder (producer Norma Precision AB, Sweden)

The 9.3×62mm (also known as 9.3×62mm Mauser) is a rimless, bottlenecked rifle cartridge designed in 1905 by German gunmaker Otto Bock. It is suitable for hunting medium to large game animals in Africa, Asia, Europe, and North America. At a typical velocity of 720 m/s (2362 ft/s), its 18.5 grams (285 gr) standard load balances recoil and power for effective use at 250m (275 yds) to 300m (328 yds). The C.I.P. Maximum Average Pressure (MAP) for the 9.3×62mm is 390.00 MPa (56,565 psi).

The 9.3×62mm was designed to fit into the Mauser 98 bolt-action rifle. Sub 84 mm (3.31 in) overall length cartridges should fit in the standard-sized M98 action without any need for magazine length alterations. European hunters and settlers in Africa often chose military rifles for their reliability and low cost, but colonial governments in Africa fearful of rebellions often banned military-caliber rifles and ammunition. The 9.3×62mm was never a military cartridge and so never had this problem. Like their military counterparts, Mauser rifles chambered in 9.3×62mm were relatively inexpensive and quite reliable. Because of these factors, 9.3x62mm quickly became popular, and usage of the cartridge became widespread.

The 9.3×74mmR is a rimmed cartridge that evolved from the 9.3×72mmR black powder cartridge. The energy levels of the 9.3×62mm and 9.3×74mmR cartridges are similar, but the cartridges are unrelated. The rimmed cartridge is slightly longer than the 9.3x62mm, allowing for lower pressure in the case while retaining muzzle velocity and energy.

== Ammunition ==
The 9.3×62mm was first loaded with an 18.5 grams (285 gr) bullet at a muzzle velocity of 655 m/s (2,150 ft/s). After World War I some companies increased the velocity to around 730 m/s (2,400 ft/s), and brought out lighter bullets. Rifles set up for the original load have their sights readjusted to shoot the newer load to point of aim. Adding to the confusion, loads at both velocities are still available. Several European firms load 9.3×62mm ammunition, including Lapua, Norma, RUAG Ammotec (RWS), SAKO, and Prvi Partizan (PPU) as well as Denel (PMP) of South Africa, and it is widely available in Africa.

In England, Kynoch, the well-known cartridge manufacturer, produced ammunition, referring to the 9.3×62mm as "9.3mm Mauser". Typically it was loaded as "metal covered soft nose bullet", 18.5 grams (285 gr), with the base marked simply "Kynoch 9.3 mm". This is no longer listed by them.

== Elsewhere ==
In several European countries, the 9.3×62mm remains a popular cartridge for hunting game like moose and wild boar, and it is offered as a standard chambering in rifles from most makers there. The CZ-USA CZ 550 rifle in 9.3×62mm chambering became available in North America in 2002, and both rifle and cartridge are gaining a strong following there, as the cartridge has a slight power edge over the popular .35 Whelen cartridge. In the US, several ammunition makers including Federal, Hornady, Nosler, and Swift offer factory-loaded 9.3×62mm sporting ammunition.

Since surplus Scandinavian and European Mausers were brought to Canada in 9.3 calibre in the early 1950s, Canadian hunters have used the 9.3×62mm cartridge to hunt large game including bison, all the deer species, and large bears. In recent years, CZ of Czech Republic, as well as SAKO and Tikka of Finland have imported many 9.3×62mm rifles to Canada and US where demand continues to be high.

== Adequacy ==
The 9.3×62mm is considered ideal for hunting the larger and tougher African big game species such as lions, leopards, gemsboks, elands, and wildebeests. Most hunters consider it a viable all-around cartridge comparable to .338 Winchester Magnum, 9.3×64mm Brenneke, .35 Whelen and .375 H&H Magnum. The 9.3×62mm has taken cleanly every dangerous game species in Africa. Though it is of smaller bore than the legal minimum .375 calibre for dangerous game in most countries, many countries specifically make an exception for the 9.3×62mm. The 9.3×62mm is considered adequate for European and North American game animals that may become dangerous, such as feral hogs and bears.

Sambar hunters in Australia turned to the 9.3×62mm after the 1996 National Firearms Agreement banned semi-automatic rifles in most circumstances. Thousands of deer hunters at once needed bolt-action rifles which delivered one-shot knockdown power on sambar, and the 9.3×62mm calibre has proven to be well up to that task.

Apart from hunting class 3 game, the 9.3×62mm is often used for last resort defense against dangerous class 3 game, particularly the great bears including brown and polar bears. It is often carried by fishermen, hunters, and guides in European arctic regions like Greenland for protection as encounters with these larger bear species can be common.

== See also ==
- 9.3×74mmR
- 9.3×64mm Brenneke
- .338 Winchester Magnum
- .35 Whelen
- .350 Remington Magnum
- .358 Norma Magnum
- .358 Winchester
- .375 H&H Magnum
- 9 mm caliber
- List of rifle cartridges
- Table of handgun and rifle cartridges
