= NATO Accessory Rail =

Rail interface system for firearms

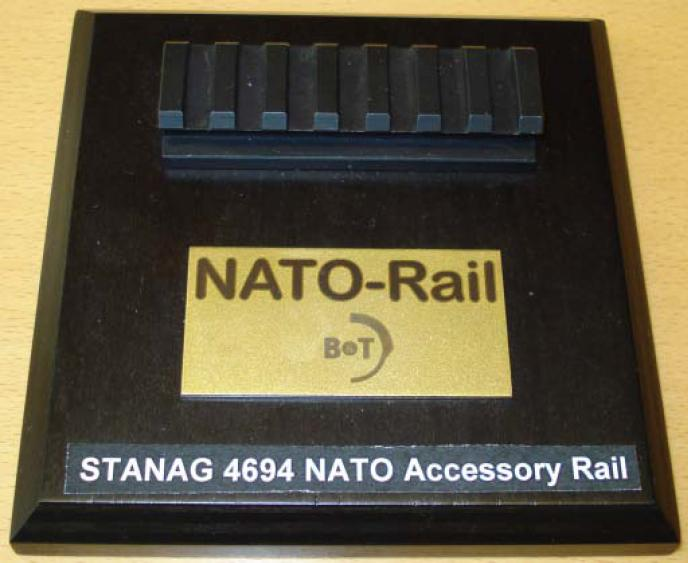
NATO Accessory Rail (STANAG 4694)

The NATO Accessory Rail (NAR), defined by NATO Standardization Agreement (STANAG) 4694, is a rail interface system standard for mounting accessory equipment such as telescopic sights, tactical lights, laser aiming modules, night vision devices, reflex sights, foregrips, bipods and bayonets to small arms such as rifles and pistols.

STANAG 4694 was approved by the NATO Army Armaments Group (NAAG), Land Capability Group 1 Dismounted Soldier (LCG1-DS) in 2009. It was published in March 2011.

The NATO Accessory Rail is backwards-compatible with the Draft STANAG 2324/MIL-STD 1913 Picatinny rail, which dates back to 3 February 1995, and was designed in conjunction with weapon specialists like Aimpoint, Beretta, Colt Firearms, FN Herstal and Heckler & Koch.

== Technical specifications ==
According to the NATO Army Armaments Group the differences between the MIL-STD 1913 Picatinny rail and the STANAG 4694 are:

- A metric reference drawing.
- Additional new measurements and tolerances.
- Adjustments of some measurements.
- Tighter straightness tolerances (approximately 50%).

Another notable change is the recommendation that while in the Picatinny rail system the V-angles are used for the alignment and reference of the accessory, NATO recommends using the top surface instead. Initial NATO tests had shown that the Picatinny rail system did not provide good repeatability. Using the top surface as a reference and alignment of the grabbers provided excellent repeatability.

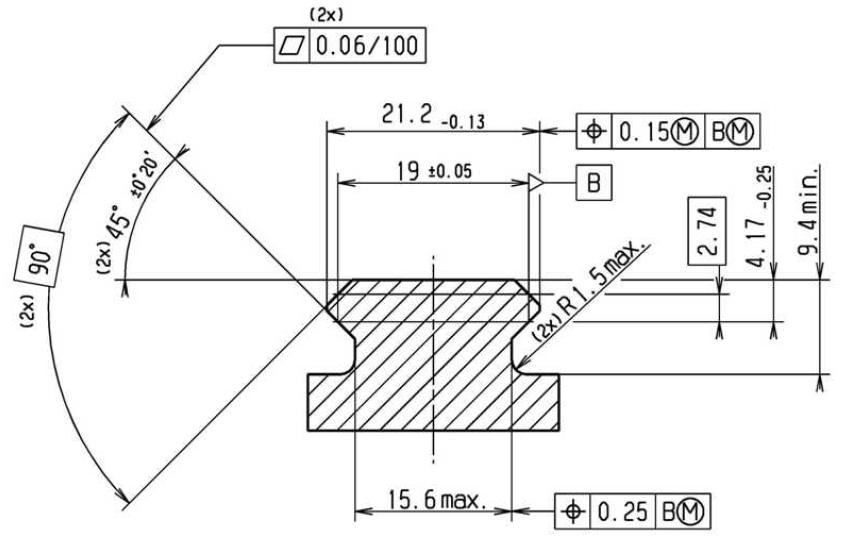
STANAG 4694 "NATO Accessory Rail" metric reference drawing (dimensions in millimetres).

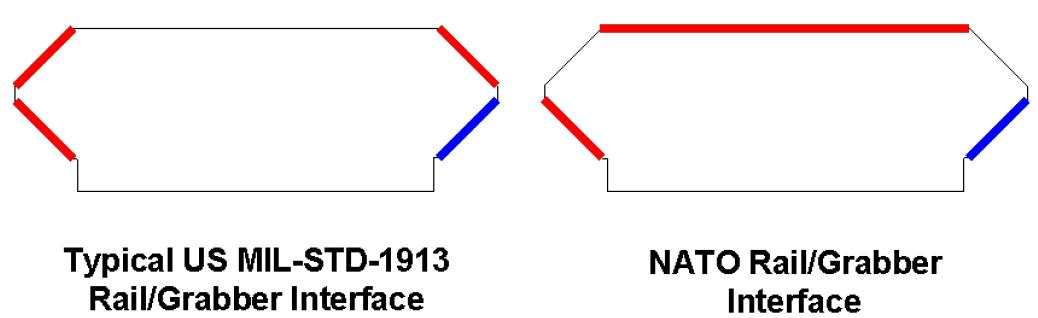
STANAG 4694 "NATO Accessory Rail" Rail - Grabber interfaces.

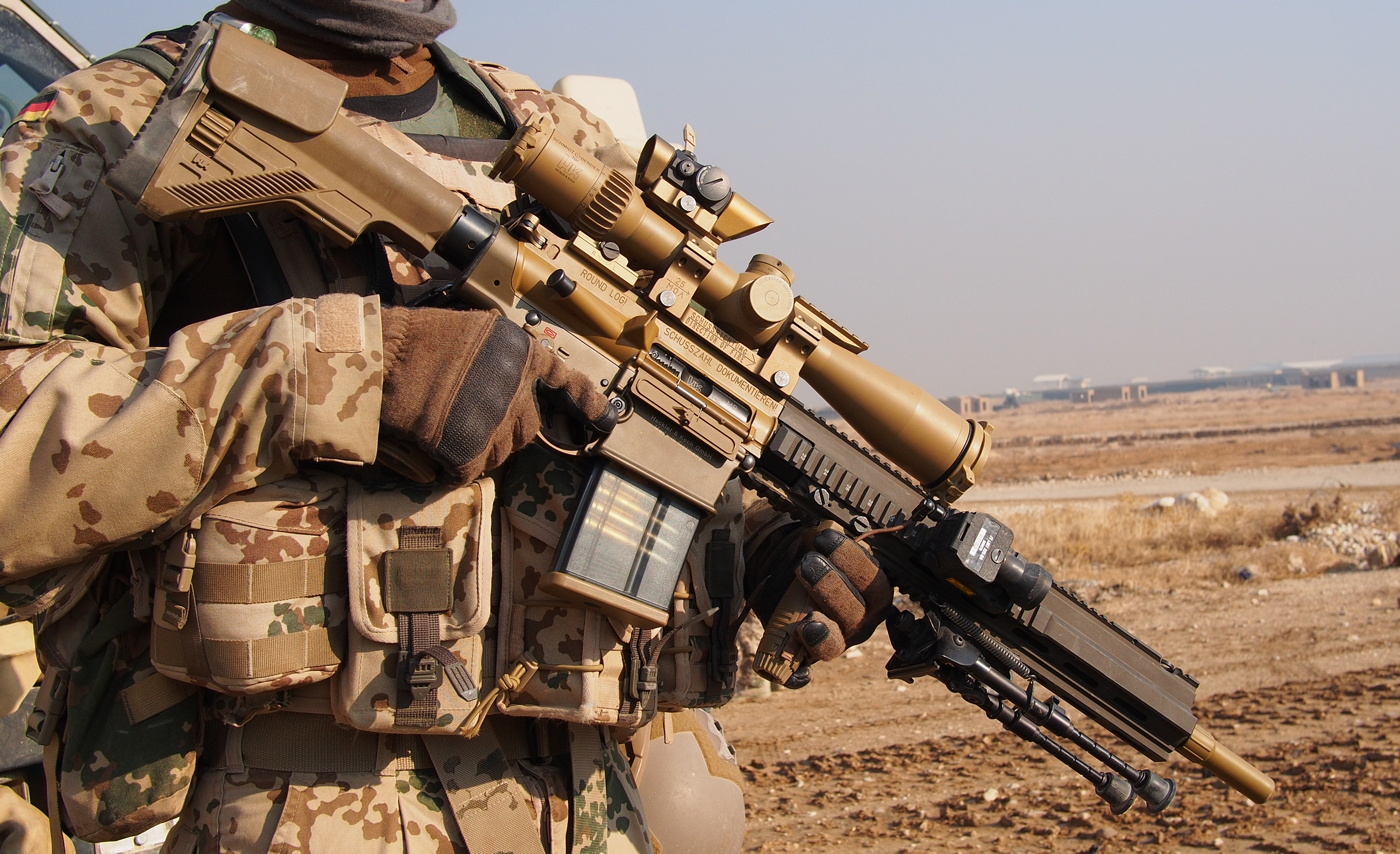
The HK G28/HK241 designated marksman rifle features STANAG 4694 NATO Accessory Rails.

== Power rail ==
In 2009, the Pentagon revealed plans to develop a NATO rail that provides electrical power to rail mounted accessories in the future. At least two proposals were presented:

- Wilcox Fusion Rail, powered from a central battery pack or a proprietary vertical grip.
- The Tworx "I-Rail", powered from a central battery pack and offering data transmission.

In 2012, the NATO Powered Rail working group selected the I-Rail design as the basis for further standardization. In 2015, STANAG 4740/AEP-90 "NATO Powered Accessory Rail" was ratified describing the rail.

According to images on the Tworx website, the STANAG 4740 rail has the grabber sides of a normal NATO rail, but the top surface is hollowed out by two lines of metal contacts. As of January 2023, no copies of the STANAG is available on the Internet, but patents from Tworx indicate that it uses a communication mechanism derived from Ethernet. The basic mode is based on 10BASE2, but higher-data-rate encodings for application such as video streaming may also be available.

== Video cameras ==
NATO rail design is also used on small video camera setups. Videos shot with DSLR or Mirrorless cameras use a variety of mounting systems for attaching microphones, monitors, lighting, and other accessories. A NATO-compatible rail is one of these systems. Although all such products are advertised to meet the same specifications, there is discussion that some of the rails and accessories are not compatible with one another.

== See also ==
- Rail System An overview of the various Rail Equipment hardware types, some are listed below.
- Rail Integration System, generic term for a system for attaching accessories to small firearms
- Weaver rail mount, early system used for scope mounts, still has some popularity in the civilian market
- Picatinny rail (MIL-STD-1913), improved and standardized version of the Weaver mount. Used for both for scope mounts, and for accessories (such as extra sling mounts, vertical grips, bipods etc.) Major popularity in the civilian market.
- Warsaw Pact rail, a rail mount system to connect telescopic sights to rifles
- UIT rail, an older standard used for mounting slings particularly on competition firearms
- KeyMod - open standard design to replace MIL-STD-1913 for mounting accessories (except for scope mounts)
- M-LOK - free licensed competing standard to KeyMod
- Zeiss rail, a ringless scope mounting standard
