= Rail integration system =

Type of system for attaching accessories and devices to firearms

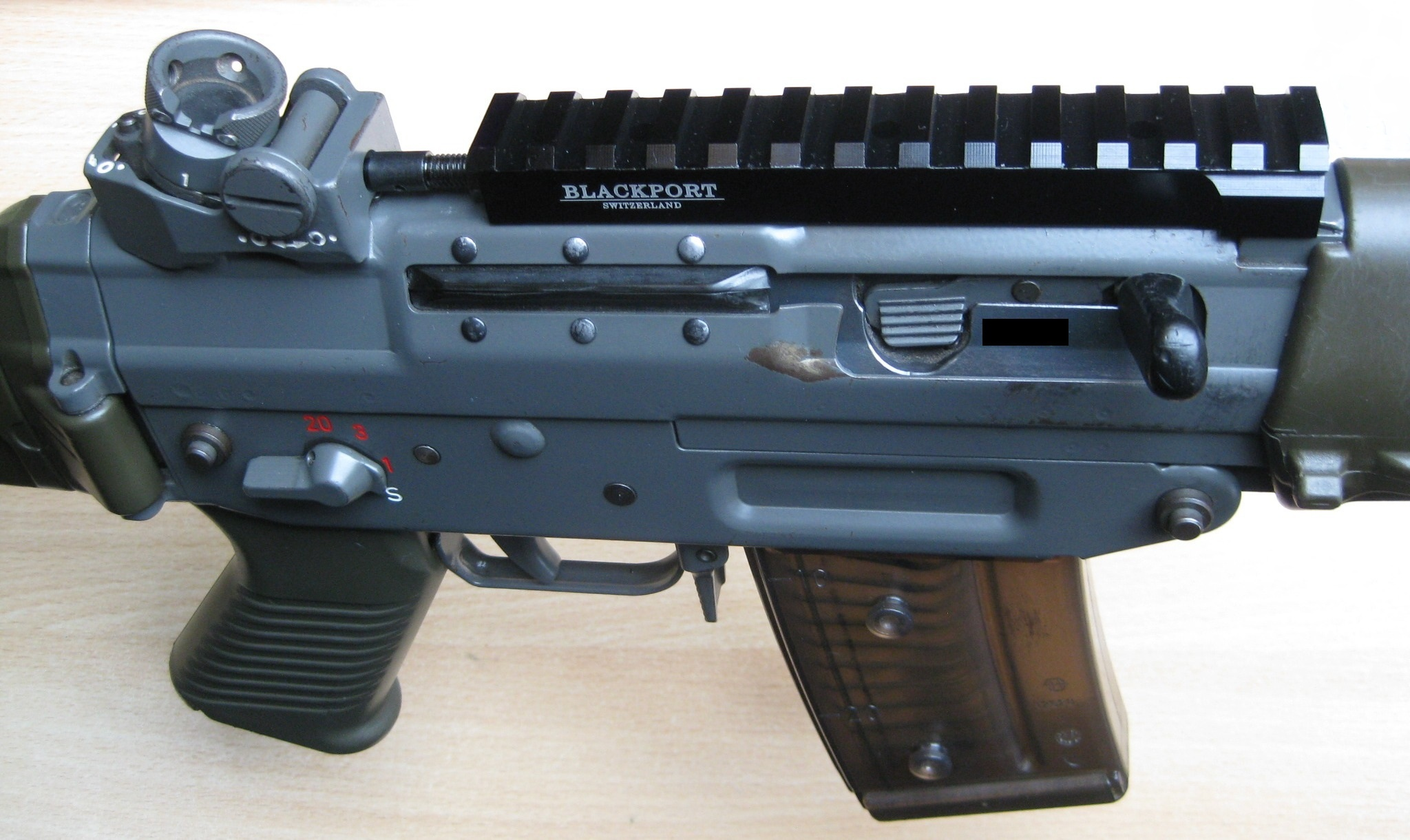
A rail system mounted on top of a SIG SG 550

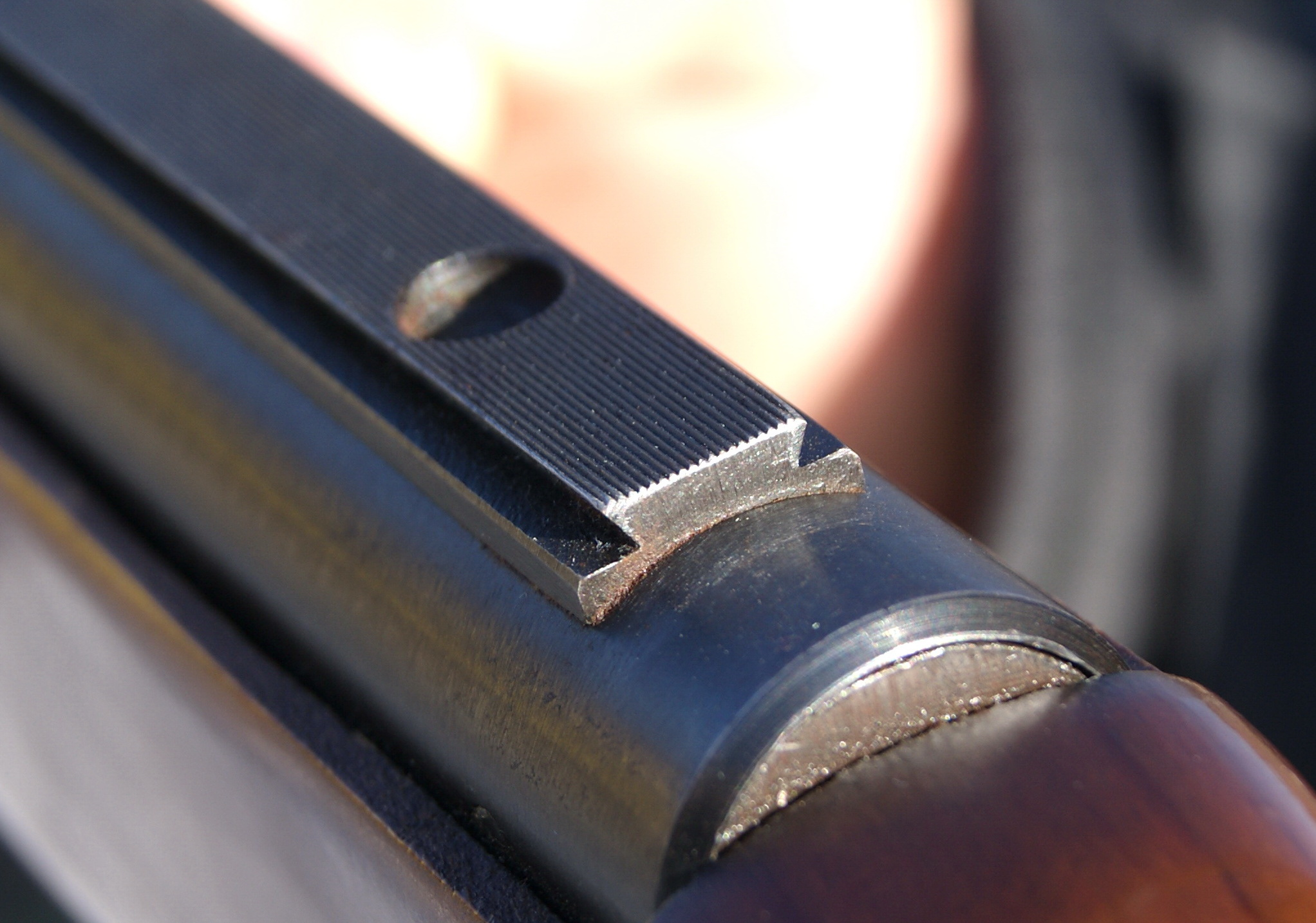
A dovetail rail on a rifle receiver for mounting a sight

A rail integration system (RIS; also called a rail accessory system (RAS), rail interface system, rail system, mount, base, gun rail, or simply a rail) is a generic term for any standardized attachment system for mounting firearm accessories via bar-like straight brackets (i.e. "rails") often with regularly spaced slots.

Rail systems are usually made of strips of metal or polymer screw-fastened onto the gun's receiver, handguard, or fore-end stock to allow variable-position attachments. An advantage of the multiple rail slots is the moveable positions to adjust for optimal placement of each item for a user's preferences, along with the ability to switch different items at different placements due to varying eye reliefs on gun sights. Firearm accessories commonly compatible with or intended for rail systems include tactical lights, laser sights, vertical forward grips, telescopic sights, holographic sights, reflex sights, backup iron sights, bipods/tripods, slings, and bayonets.

The common types of rail systems for firearms are the dovetail rail (including the Soviet variant known as the Warsaw Pact rail), the Weaver rail, the Picatinny rail, the SOPMOD, the KeyMod and the M-LOK. There are also various non-military designs used in shooting sports to attach slings and bipods such as the UIT rail, Zeiss rail and Freeland rail.

== History ==
Original rails were a raised metal strip with the sides undercut, less standardized than the dovetail design, to allow hardware to slide on and be secured by means of compression only.

== Design ==
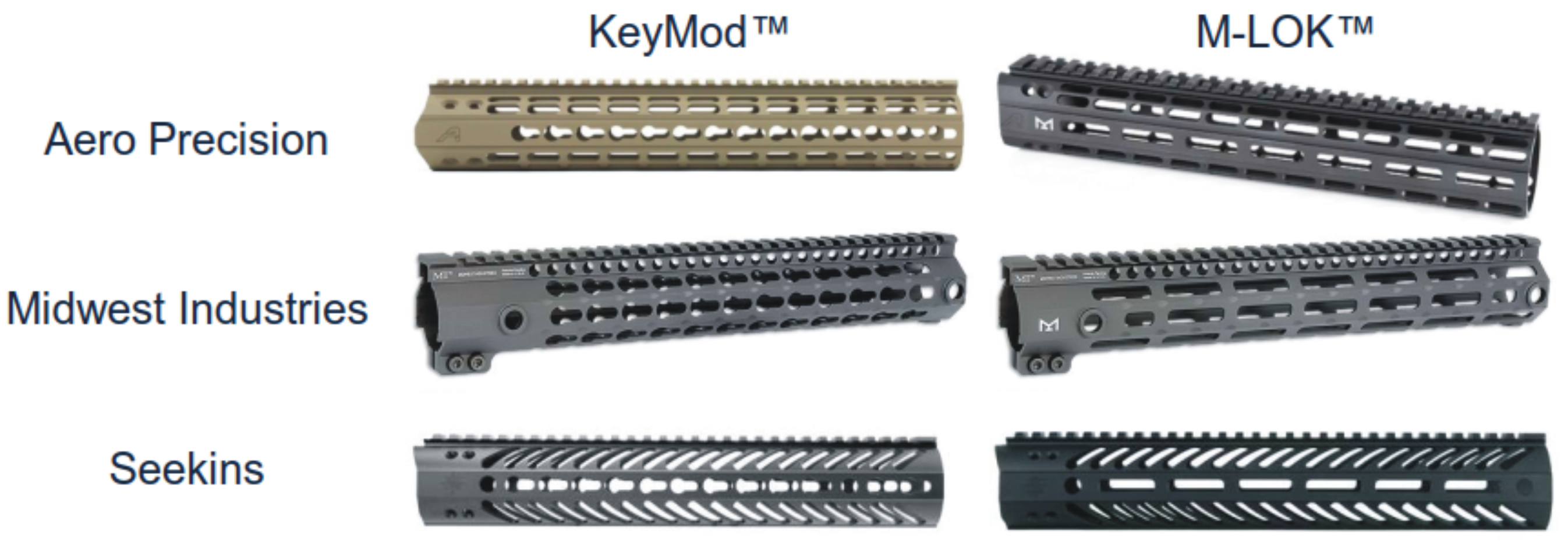
KeyMod and M-LOK handguards from various manufacturers

Rail systems are usually based on the handguard of a weapon and/or the upper receiver. Modern pistols usually have rail systems on the underside of the barrel. Rails on rifles usually start at the top dead center ("12 o'clock"), with other common placements at the bottom 180° ("6 o'clock") and on the sides at 90° ("3 o'clock" and "9 o'clock"); some rails are also diagonal at 45° angles as opposed to 90° angles, though these are less common. There may be additional attachment rails or holes at each 45° angle position running partially or entirely the length of the handguard.

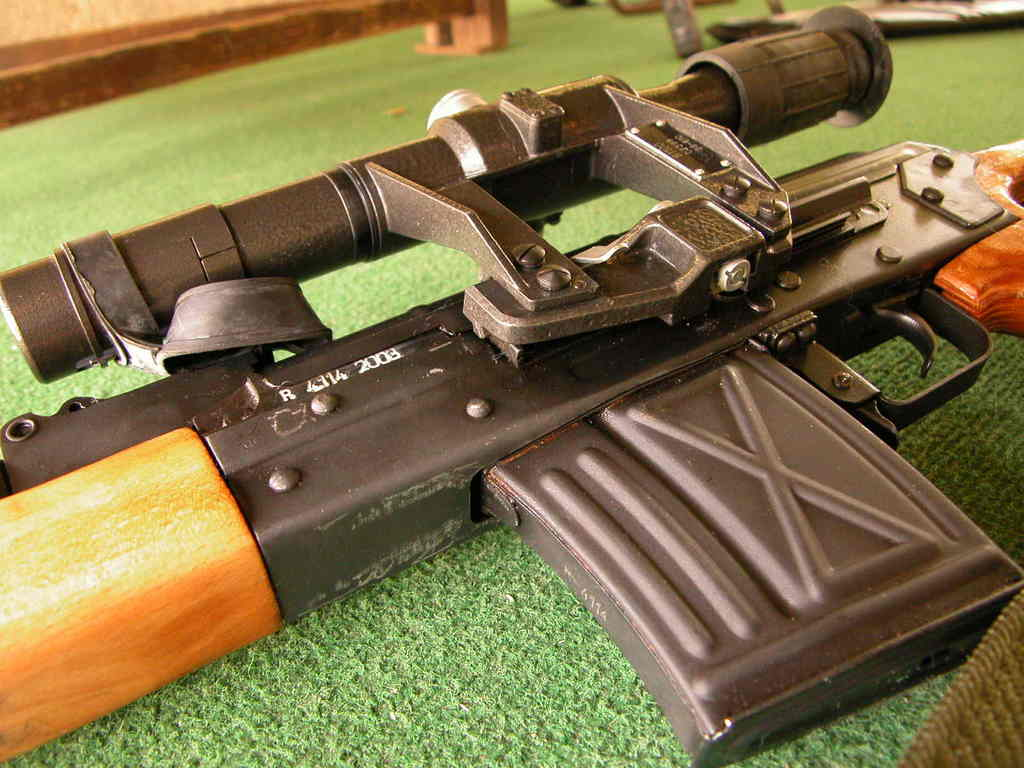
A Romanian PSL rifle with a Warsaw rail

On the Kalashnikov rifles, the Warsaw rail is attached to the left side of the receiver when viewed from the rear. With more modern versions adding Picatinny style rails onto the sides of the handguards of the rifles for the mounting of additional equipment. Due to updating equipment, both styles may be found on some Warsaw Pact weapons.

Modern-designed firearms often include rails made into the body, instead of being an added-on modification. Older firearms may need permanent modifications of having holes drilled and tapped for screw threads to fasten the rail sections to the firearm. This is easier than milling out a dove tail slot for the placement of a gun sight's parts.

Optics such as telescopic sights, reflector sights, holographic sights, red dot magnifiers, night vision sights, or thermal sights may be placed between the iron sights. The rail section may also come in various heights to help align equipment, which may align with the original iron sights inline or below an illuminated optic's center dot, ring or chevron. This is referred to as absolute or lower 1/3 co-witness respectively.

In addition to height variations some rail brackets may be offset at various degrees. 22.5°, 45°, and 90° are the most common, to place accessories and/or backup folding collapsible iron sights in such a way so that they are out of the line sight on the top of the firearm and/or to decrease the outer profile edge's size. Then, the original sights are a backup if the electronic optic should fail. The rail section may also move weapon-mounted lights forward so the light does not shine and reflect on the firearm directly, which may create shadows.

The amount of rail space allows adjustment and personal optimization of each device and tool attached for the user. As designs have advanced the amount of space has succeeded in the actual need for placement space. Thus, rail covers and protectors may be added to prevent snagging on gear and/or plant foliage.

Future rails systems may have the option of carrying batteries or other electricity systems to supply the needs of the increasing electronics mounted to aid the shooter. Standards are still being determined for these types of systems. An example of such is NATO standards NATO Accessory Rail which is the continued improvement and standardization of the Picatinny rail.

== Types ==
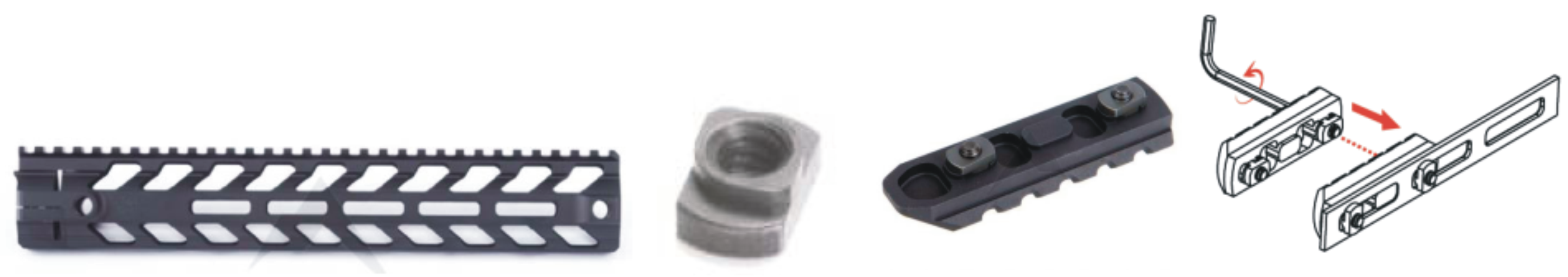
A combination hand guard with Picatinny rail on top with M-LOK slots on the side, with two sling mounts and a five-slot Picatinny rail section accessory showing the mounting hardware

Most RIS equipment is compatible with one or more of the most common rail systems, all of which are broadly similar:

- Dovetail rail: one of the earliest rail systems, relies primarily on friction from the side unit set screw on the mounted accessory to stop longitudinal shifting
- Warsaw Pact rail: a Soviet-designed dovetail rail variant with cut-outs that allow quick side-mounting of optics (e.g. PSO-1 and USP-1) on Dragunov sniper rifles, RPG-7 and RPG-29 grenade launchers, as well as some versions of AKM and AK-74 assault rifles and PK family machine guns.
- Weaver rail: an early improvement design upon the dovetail rail, invented by William Ralph Weaver (1905–1975). This system is still popular in the civilian market.
- Picatinny rail: the mil-spec standardized rail system evolved from the Weaver rail. Also known as MIL-STD-1913, Picatinny rails date from the mid-1990s and have very strict dimensions and tolerance standards. The Picatinny has a rail of a very similar profile to the Weaver, but the slot width is 0.206 in (5.23 mm), and the spacing of slot centers is consistent at 0.394 in (10.01 mm). Many rail-grabber-mounted accessories can be used on either type of rail. The Picatinny locking slot width is 0.206 in (5.232 mm) and the spacing of slot centers is 0.394 in (10.008 mm). Due to this, with devices that use only one locking slot, Weaver devices will fit on Picatinny rails, but Picatinny devices will not always fit on Weaver rails.
- NATO Accessory Rail: a metric standardized upgrade from the Picatinny rail.
- KeyMod: open source "negative space" (hollow slot) design introduced by VLTOR to replace the Picatinny rail for mounting accessories (except for scope mounts).
- M-LOK: a free licensed "negative space" design introduced by Magpul Industries to compete with KeyMod.

These systems are used primarily in the military and by firearm enthusiasts to improve the usability of the weapon, being accessorized quickly and efficiently without requiring the operator to field-strip the weapon. Basic systems such as small rails (20mm is standard) with holes machined in them to be screwed onto the existing hand-guard of a rifle can cost as little as US $25 to US $40. More advanced systems allow for numerous accessories to be mounted simultaneously and can cost upwards of US $200.

== Compatibility ==
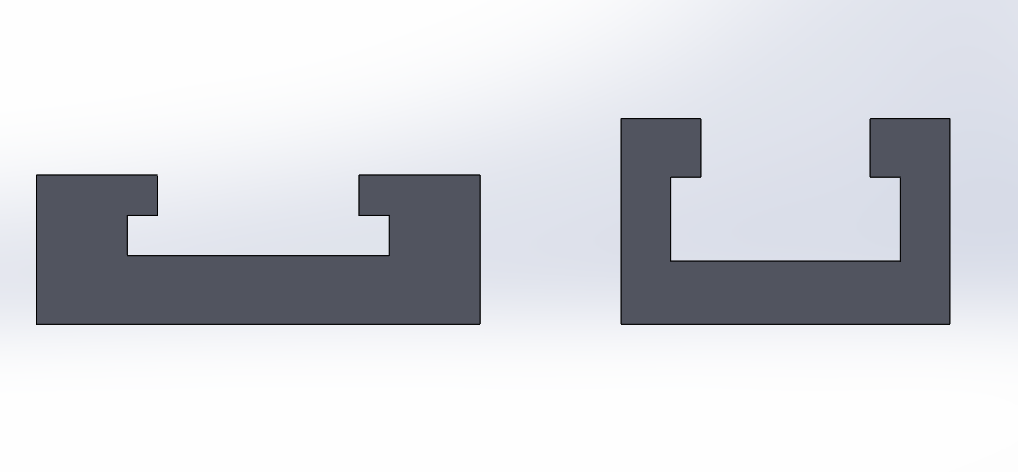
A drawing comparing Anschütz (left) and Freeland equipment rails (right)

Adapters to other types of rail interfaces may be used for legacy issues and/or to change the surface texture, abrasiveness and/or overall outer circumference of the entire rails system for the fit of the hand. Dovetail, Weaver, and Picatinny are all outward or raised attachment surfaces, while M-LOK and KeyMod have smooth surfaces with different standards & styles of holes cut into their assemblies to place the attachment hardware internally. Both of these styles are often in the handguards. All make the mounting and dismounting of these objects significantly easier.

Items may be fastened by threaded bolts, requiring the use of a screwdriver or Allen wrench. Some tool-free variations of thumb screws or thumb nuts may have a threaded quick disconnect lever that pulls the hardware and plates together against the rails. During firearm recoil, the accessory may slide within that section of the rail. To avoid this, when tightening a slide, move the device forward in the placement slots and ensure that the section of the bolt is positioned against the vertical/forward section of the rail slots.

== Adoption ==
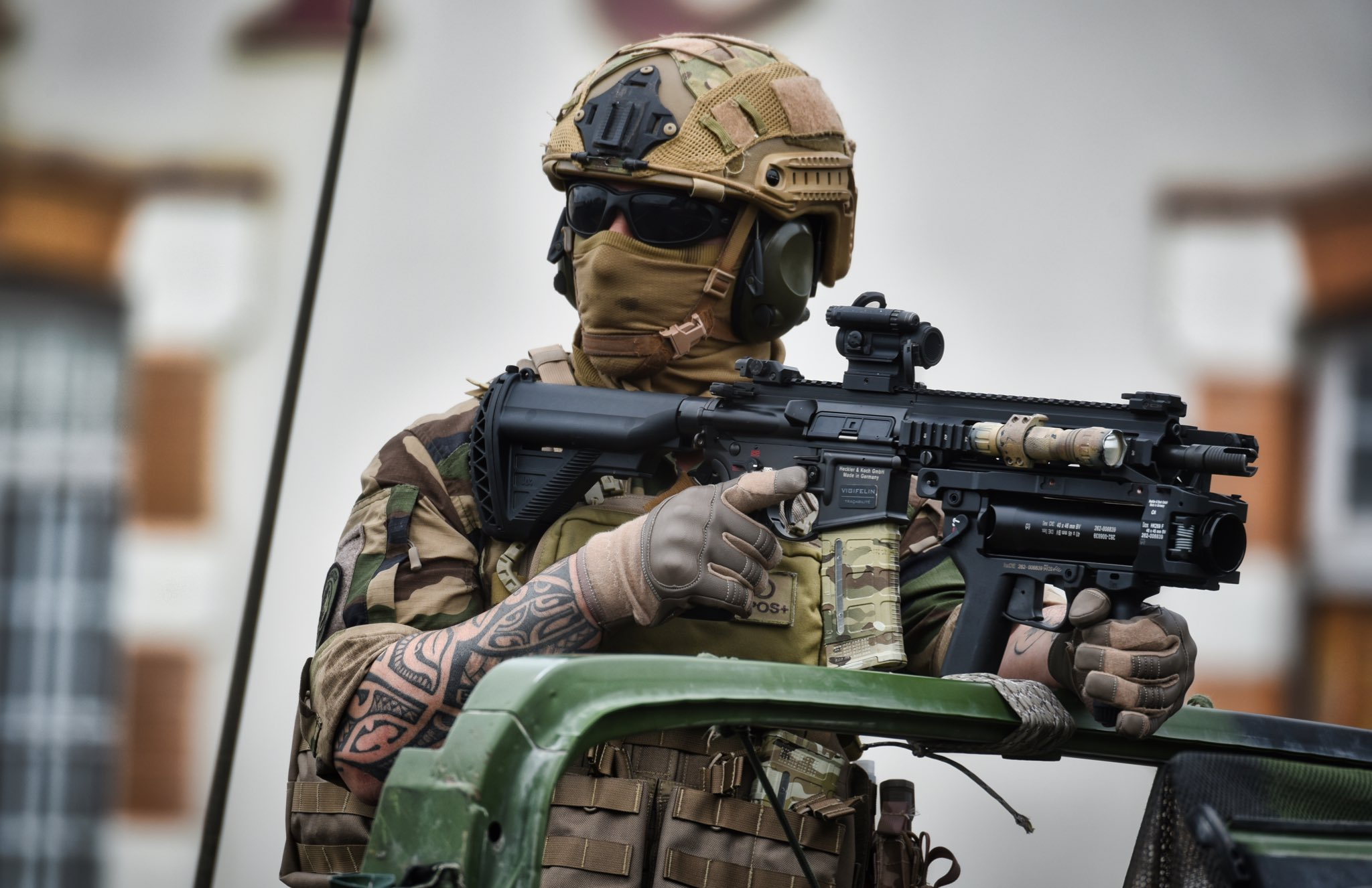
A French Army soldier armed with an Heckler & Koch HK416 with multiple rail-mounted attachments, including a scope, a tactical light, and an M320 underbarrel grenade launcher

Though not particularly common on firearms until the late 20th century, most modern firearms in military service and the civilian market have rail integration systems that may replace original parts. The prevalence of rails on modern firearms compared to past designs is largely owed to the increasing popularity and availability of attachments such as sights.

The most common weapons to have rails are individual firearms, particularly long guns and service rifles such as the rifle, carbine, submachine gun, personal defense weapon, shotgun, designated marksman rifle, sniper rifle, and squad automatic weapon, though some larger or crew-served weapons such as the heavy machine gun, anti-materiel rifle, and rocket launcher have been designed or refreshed to include rails for compatibility. Even ranged weapons that are not firearms, such as bow and arrow, crossbow, airsoft gun, and paintball marker.

Heavy machine guns have started to include and use rail sections and options for attachments of optics. Civilian clone rifles are the main weapons to adopt this, while crossbows, hunting rifles, shotguns, and handguns may be produced with rail sections either attached and/or made structurally as part of the actual firearm. Airsoft and paintball clone weapons may also have rails.

== See also ==
- Firearm modification
- Sling (firearms)
- Zeiss rail
