= KeyMod =

KeyMod System
- Type: Attachment System
- Place of origin: United States

Production history
- Designer: Eric Kincel
- Designed: 2011–2012
- Produced: 2012–present

KeyMod is a universal interface system for firearm accessory components. The concept was first created by VLTOR Weapon Systems of Tucson, Arizona, and released through Noveske Rifleworks of Grants Pass, Oregon, before being published open sourced in the public domain for adoption by the entire firearms accessory industry. The name "KeyMod" was coined by Eric Kincel (then working for VLTOR Weapon Systems) following the naming trend of other VLTOR accessories with the suffix "Mod" meaning modular, and "Key" being a reference to the key-hole profile of the mounting slots.

== History ==
VLTOR Weapon Systems had previously pursued a design which was the basis for the KeyMod system. While developing the first prototype systems, Eric Kincel of VLTOR Weapon systems was approached by John Noveske of Noveske Rifleworks with a design for a universal accessory attachment system. After a short collaboration, during which Todd Krawczyk of Noveske Rifleworks suggested an improvement to the accessory lock/anti-rotation nut, John Noveske decided to adopt what became the KeyMod system for the NSR series of hand guards and accessories. Kincel's design was developed simultaneously, but without knowledge of the independently developed keyhole slot system by Accuracy International, until after KeyMod's release.

The specifications for the KeyMod system were first published in July 2012. The current revision was released in October 2012.

In 2017, a summary report of testing conducted by Naval Surface Warfare Center Crane Division for United States Special Operations Command (USSOCOM) indicated that, while comparable in endurance and rough handling testing, the M-LOK system greatly outperformed KeyMod in repeatability, drop testing and failure load testing.

== Description ==
KeyMod is an open-source design released for use and distribution in the public domain in an effort to standardize universal attachment systems in the firearm accessories market. The KeyMod system is intended to be used as a direct attachment method for firearm accessories such as flashlight mounts, laser modules, sights, scope mounts, vertical grips, rail panels, hand stops, barricade supports, and many others.

The goal is to eliminate the need for the rail to be fully outfitted with 1913 rails covering the entire handguard. The KeyMod system allows a user to place MIL-STD-1913 rails wherever needed, even in the 45° positions at times. The KeyMod system consists of two parts: the KeyMod slot and the KeyMod nut. The slot is distinctive with a larger diameter through-hole combined with a narrow slot. The slot is chamfered on the backside, while the through hole is sized for clearance of a quick-detach sling swivel (approximately 3/8" diameter).

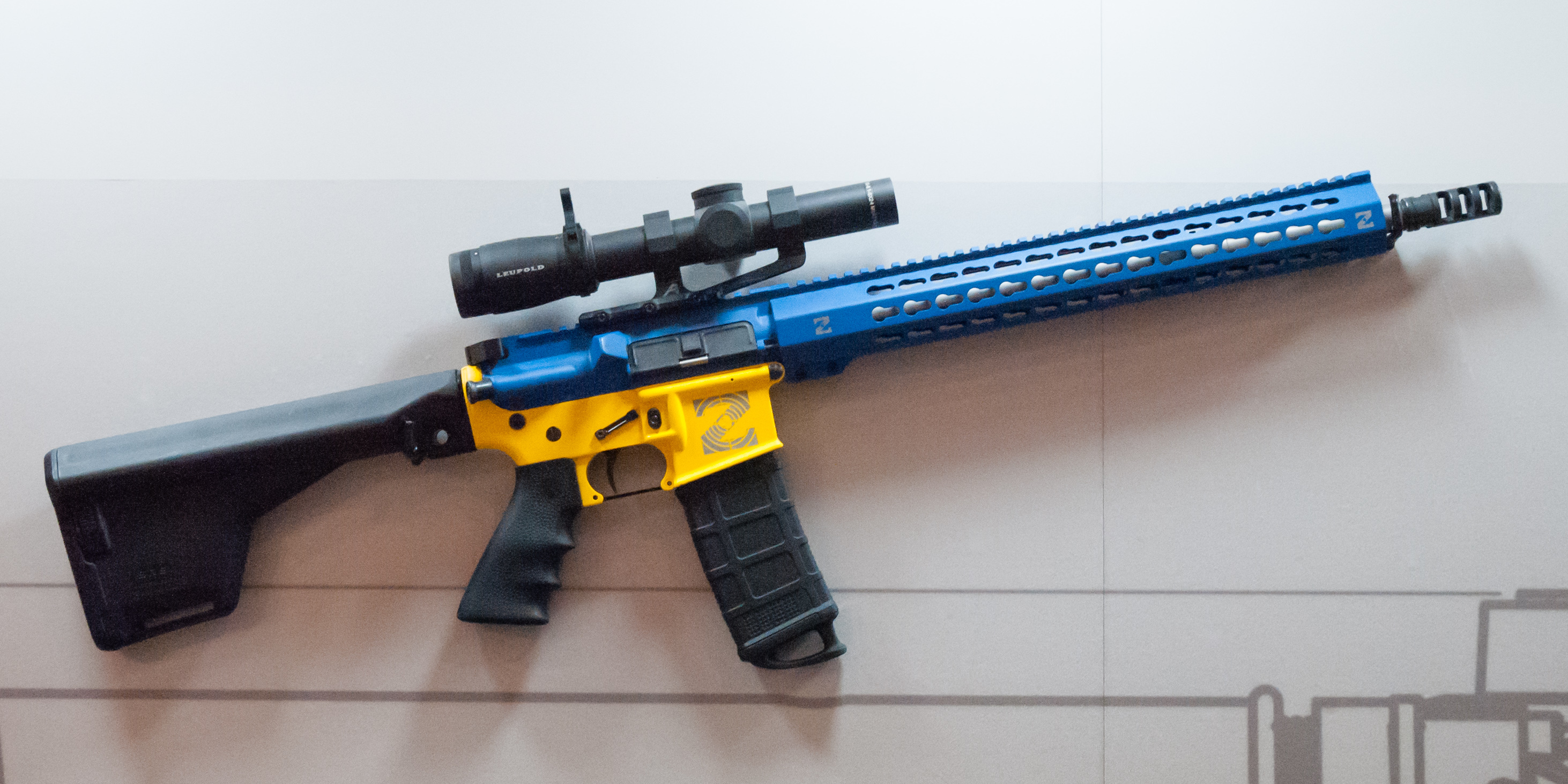
Zbroyar Z-15 rifle with KeyMod slots on the handguard.

The nut is stepped, and the larger diameter end is chamfered around 270 degrees of its diameter. The angled face created is meant to interface with the chamfer on the backside of the KeyMod slot. The full diameter is left intact to create two flats on the nut which align the nut to the slot, and allow it to be indexed to the accessory as well as to the KeyMod slot. This eliminates the need to align the nuts to the holes prior to accessory installation. In most accessories, the screw is swaged after assembly to ensure that it cannot be backed out of the nut. This prevents loss of small parts (screws, nuts or other small parts used in the assembly of the accessory). The spacing of the holes is critical and is based on MIL-STD-1913 spacing to allow the greatest modularity with existing accessories.

The KeyMod specifications call out a "recoil lug" on the accessories, which is intended to interface with the larger through hole portion and resist slippage of accessories during counter-recoil. The combination of the angled interface of the nut to the KeyMod slot and the recoil lug to the through hole make for a very strong attachment point which will not slip under harsh recoil or counter recoil. It also provides for an excellent return-to-zero when removed and re-installed.

== Technical specifications ==
The specifications for the KeyMod system were initially released by VLTOR Weapon Systems as an open-source set of drawings. As such, some manufacturers have added their own variations to the system, such as using the through-hole portion as a sling-swivel attachment point. The critical interface dimensions, however, still follow the specifications. In an effort to ensure interface dimensions are kept consistent and repeatable, Bravo Company MFG released a set of drawings for KeyMod gauges that allow for expedient inspection of the 100° chamfer feature in January 2014.

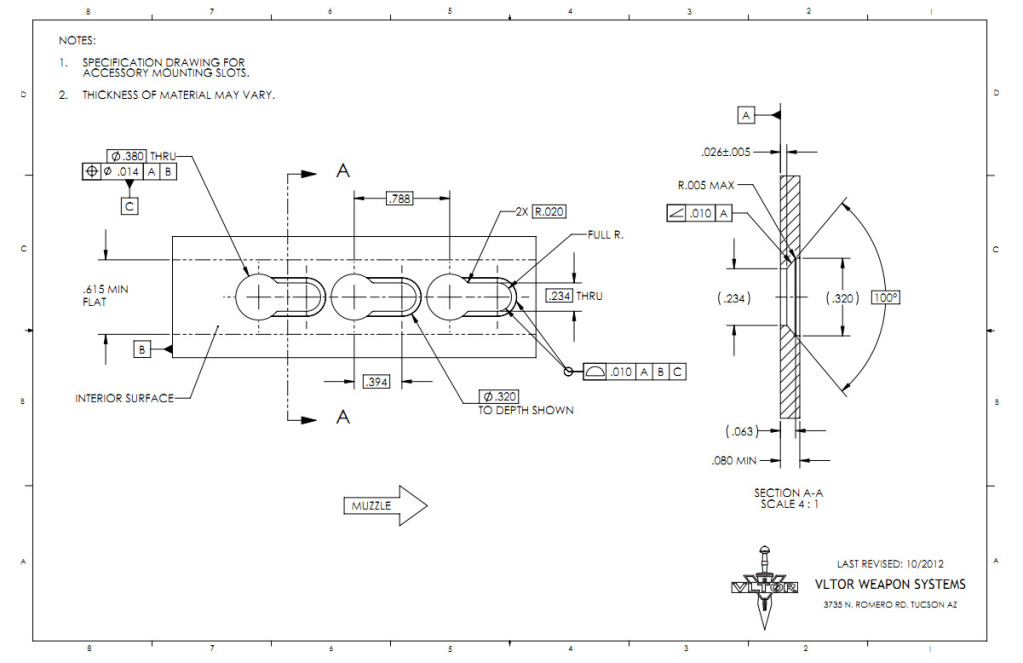
KeyMod Slot details

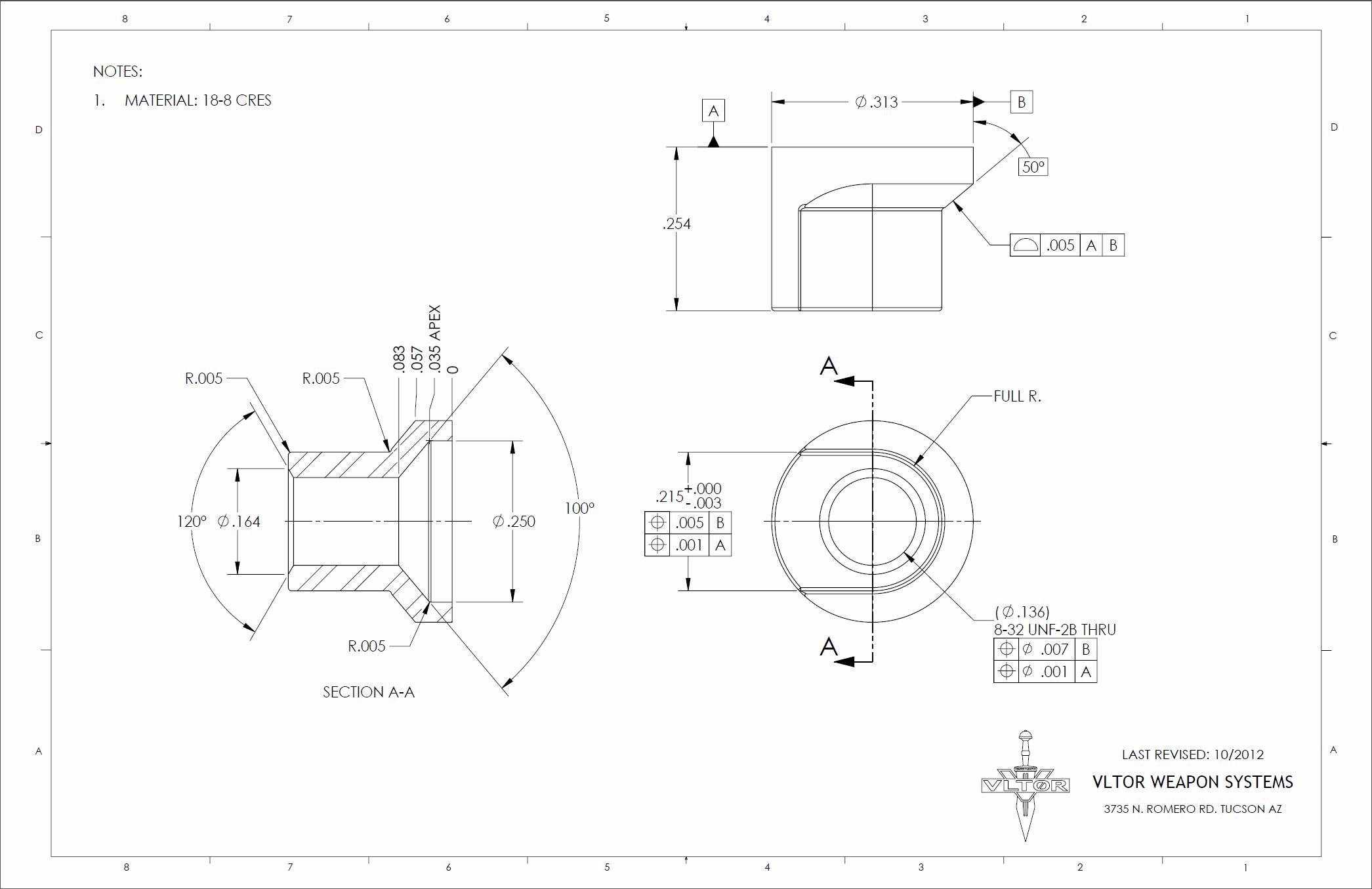
KeyMod nut details

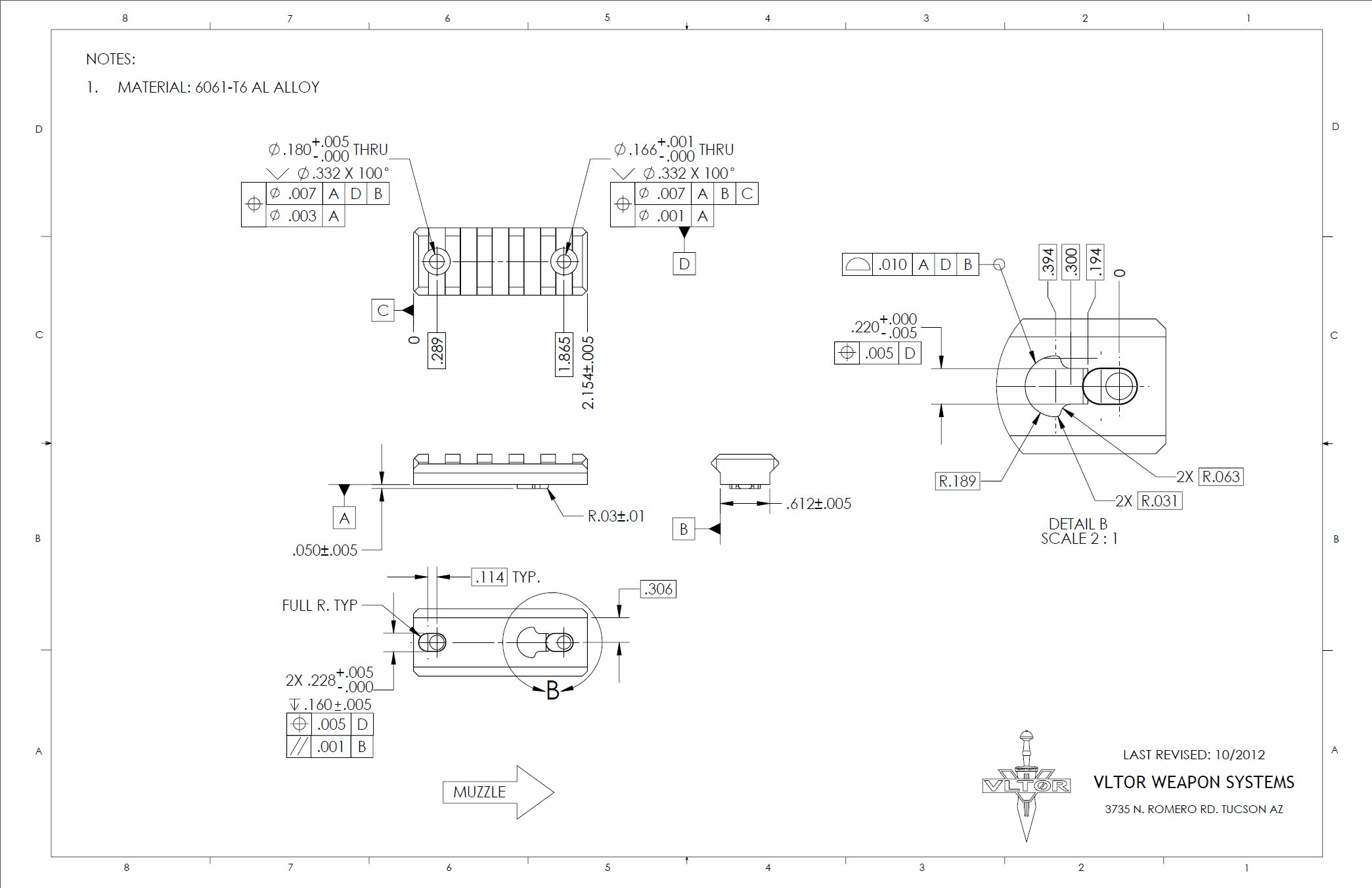
KeyMod accessory details

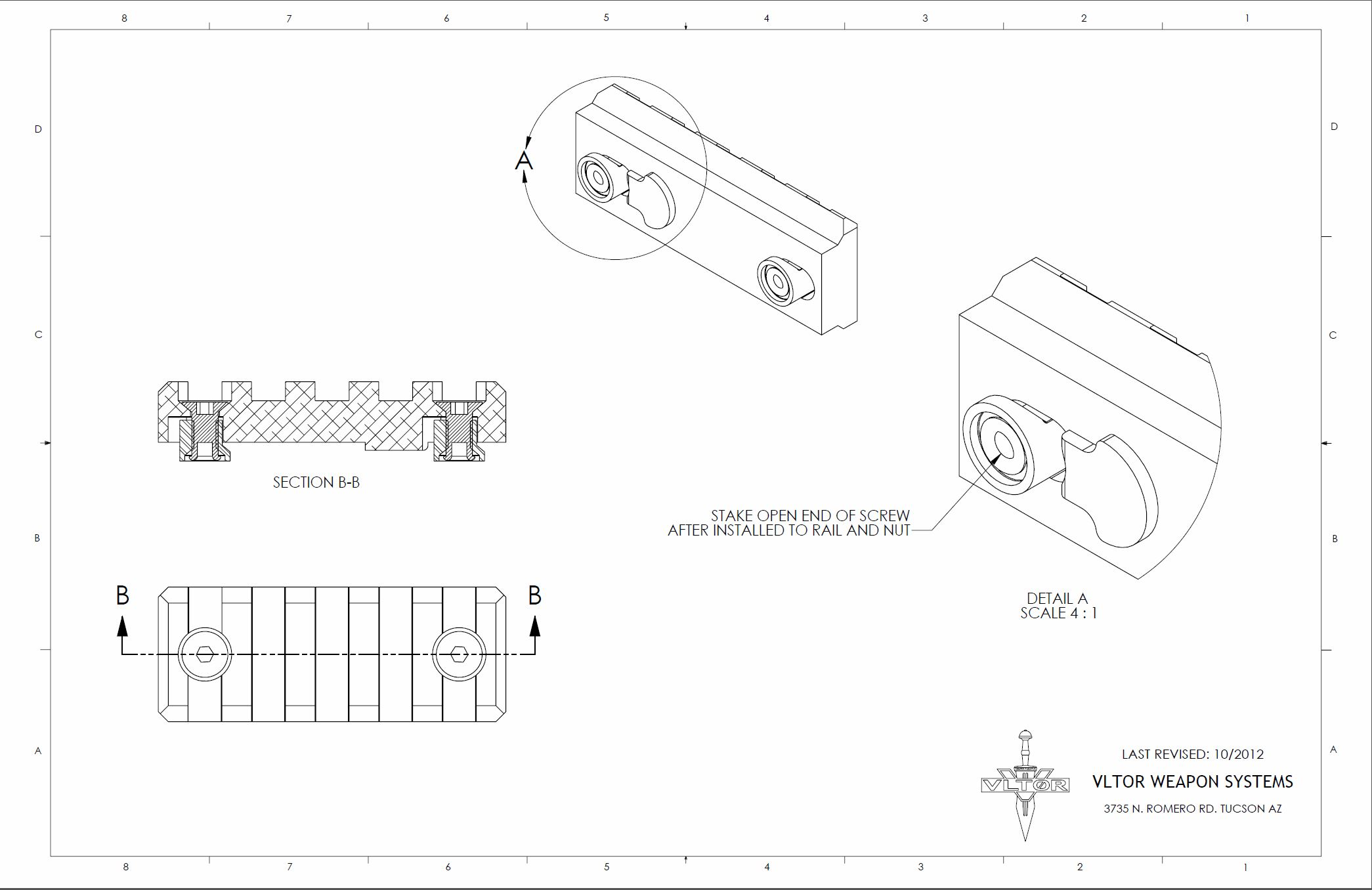
KeyMod nut/screw assembly details

Complete PDF

== See also ==
- Rail Integration System, generic term for a system for attaching accessories to small firearms
- Weaver rail mount, early system used for scope mounts, still has some popularity in the civilian market
- Picatinny rail (MIL-STD-1913), improved and standardized version of the Weaver mount. Used both for scope mounts and for accessories (such as extra sling mounts, vertical grips, bipods etc.). Major popularity in the civilian market.
- NATO Accessory Rail, further development from the MIL-STD-1913
- UIT rail, older standard used for mounting slings particularly on competition firearms
- M-LOK, free licensed competing standard to KeyMod
- Zeiss rail, ringless scope mounting standard
