= UIT rail =

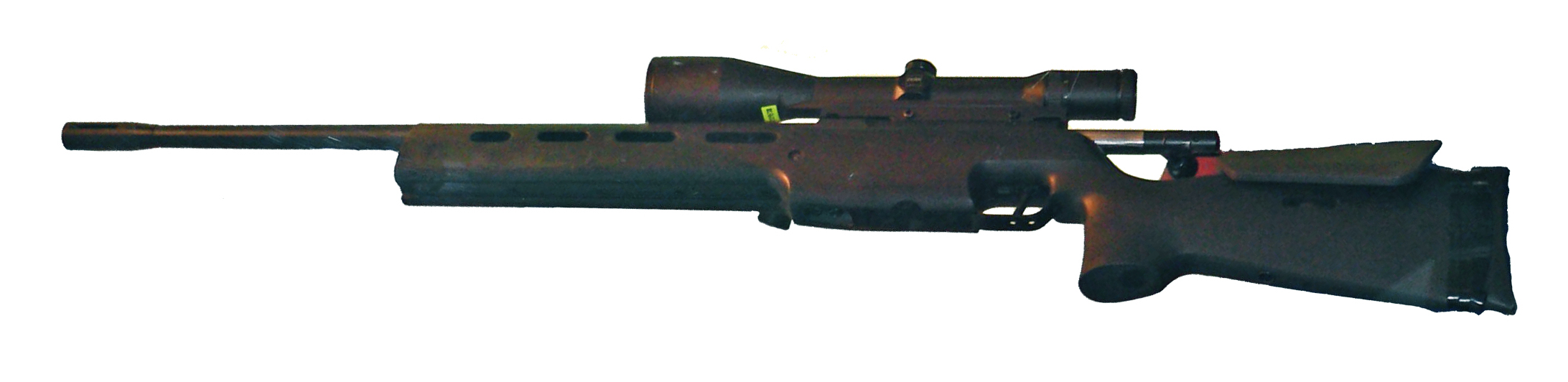
The SIG Sauer SSG 3000 sniper rifle features an Anschütz type UIT rail on the underside of its handguard. The rifle pictured is also fitted with a Zeiss Victory Diavari 3-12x56 telescopic sight with Zeiss rail.

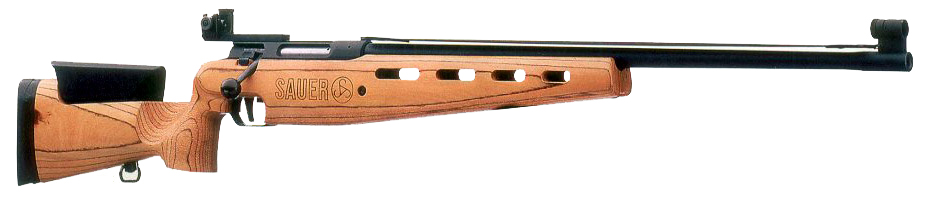
The SIG Sauer 200 STR target rifle also features an Anschütz type UIT rail on the underside of its handguard.

The UIT rail, also known as Anschutz rail, is a standard used for mounting slings and other gun accessories in competition shooting, and is essentially a T-slot track shaped aluminium extrusion profile accepting attachments in the form of T-slot nuts, or similar.

A similar design is called Freeland rail, but the dimensions of Anschütz (UIT) and Freeland rails differ. The Anschütz rail is wide and shallow, and the Freeland is narrower and deeper. Accessories made for one of the two types are not necessarily compatible with the other.

== Dimensions ==
Dimensions below are approximate.

	Description	Anschütz (metric)	Anschütz (imperial)	Freeland (metric)	Freeland (imperial)
A	Internal width of opening	10 mm	0.400 in	8.4 mm	0.330 in
B	Internal width bottom	13 mm	0.512 in	11.4 mm	0.450 in
C	Total internal height	4 mm	0.160 in		
D	Internal track height	2 mm	0.079 in		
E	External height	7.4 mm	0.290 in	10.2 mm	0.400 in
F	External width	22 mm	0.870 in	16.3 mm	0.640 in

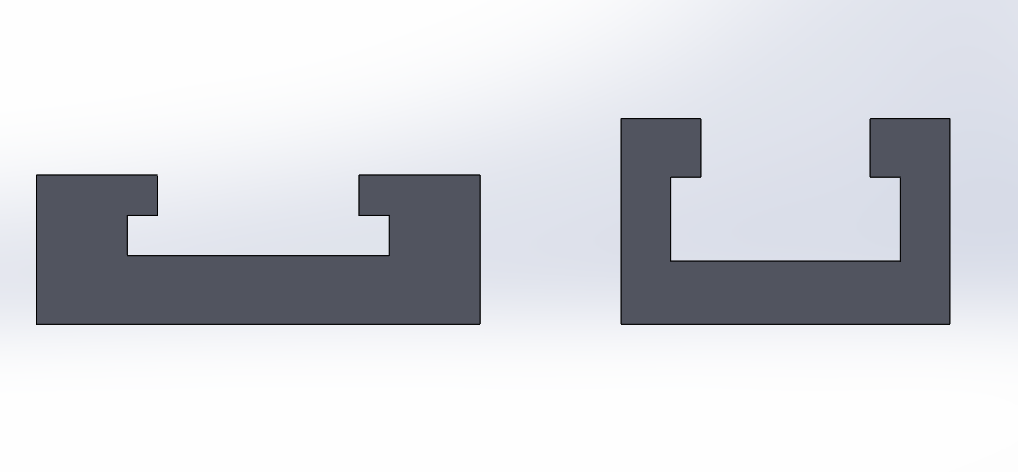
Drawing comparing Anschütz (left) and Freeland equipment rails (right).

== See also ==
- Rail Integration System, generic term for a system for attaching accessories to small firearms
- Weaver rail mount, early system used for scope mounts, still has some popularity in the civilian market
- Sling swivel, older standard used for mounting slings, particularly on hunting firearms
- Picatinny rail (MIL-STD-1913), improved and standardized version of the Weaver mount. Used for both for scope mounts, and for accessories (such as extra sling mounts, vertical grips, bipods etc.) Major popularity in the civilian market.
- NATO Accessory Rail- further development from the MIL-STD-1913
- KeyMod - open standard design to replace MIL-STD-1913 for mounting accessories (except for scope mounts)
- M-LOK - free licensed competing standard to KeyMod
- Zeiss rail, a ringless scope mounting standard
