= M-LOK =

Firearm rail interface system

- Type: Attachment System
- Place of origin: United States

Production history
- Designer: Magpul Industries
- Designed: 2007–2014
- Produced: 2014–present

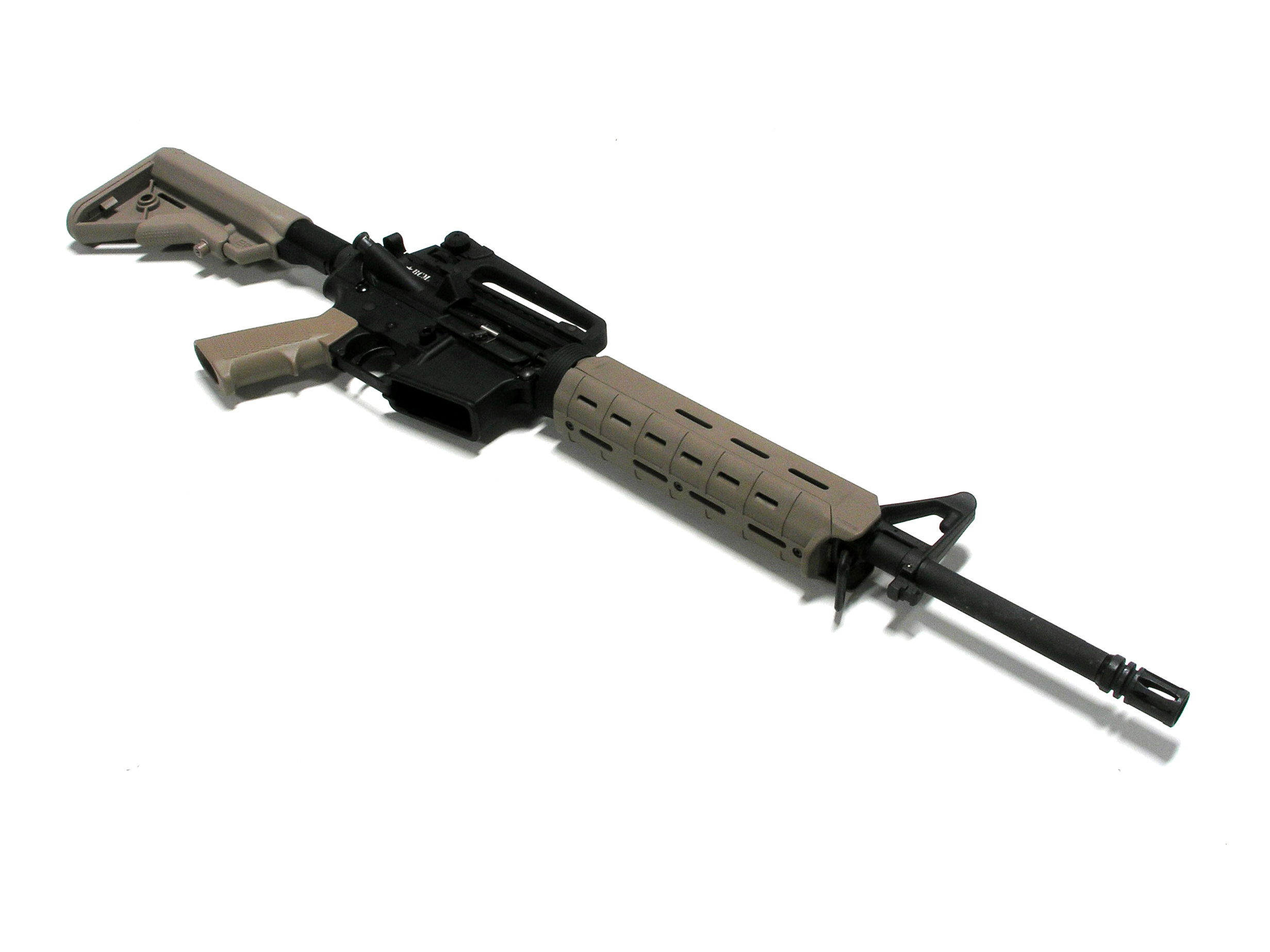
Magpul MOE M-LOK handguard on a user-assembled AR-15 semi-automatic rifle

M-LOK, for Modular Lock, is a firearm rail interface system developed and patented by Magpul Industries. The license is free-of-charge, but subject to an approval process.

M-LOK allows for direct accessory attachment onto the "negative space" (hollow slot) mounting points, and is a competing standard to VLTOR's open sourced KeyMod system for replacing the ubiquitous Picatinny rail in some applications. Both M-LOK and KeyMod enable the user to have a slimmer, lighter, smoother and more fenestrated handguard/fore-end with accessories and gadgets mounted only where needed as compared to a Picatinny handguard, which typically has whole length rail slots, resulting in a heavier weight, bulkier handguard and poorer barrel ventilation, resulting in the barrel overheating more quickly.

The M-LOK system can be seen as an evolution of the Magpul Original Equipment (MOE) system, but the two are not fully compatible. Though newer M-LOK accessories can be used on older MOE slot handguards if an adaptor plate is used, there is no adaptor available for using older MOE accessories on the newer M-LOK handguards.

== History ==
A prototype of the MOE slot was revealed by Magpul in late 2007 together with their Masada Concept Rifle (which would later be known as the Adaptive Combat Rifle). Magpul released the MOE slot system in 2008 as a feature on their MOE handguards, and at the same time compatible accessories such as Picatinny rail sections, direct MOE mounted light mounts, grips, bipod studs, etc. were released.

The MOE slot standard was never officially released, and a drawback to the system was that the rear side of the panel had to be accessed in order to mount accessories, limiting its application. The MOE slot system uses a weld nut which has to be placed manually on the inside of the handguard before mounting, making the slot system unsuited for applications such as free-floating handguards. Also, depending on the accessory item, the spacing increments between the MOE slots were not small or uniform enough to adjust the desired placement of accessories.

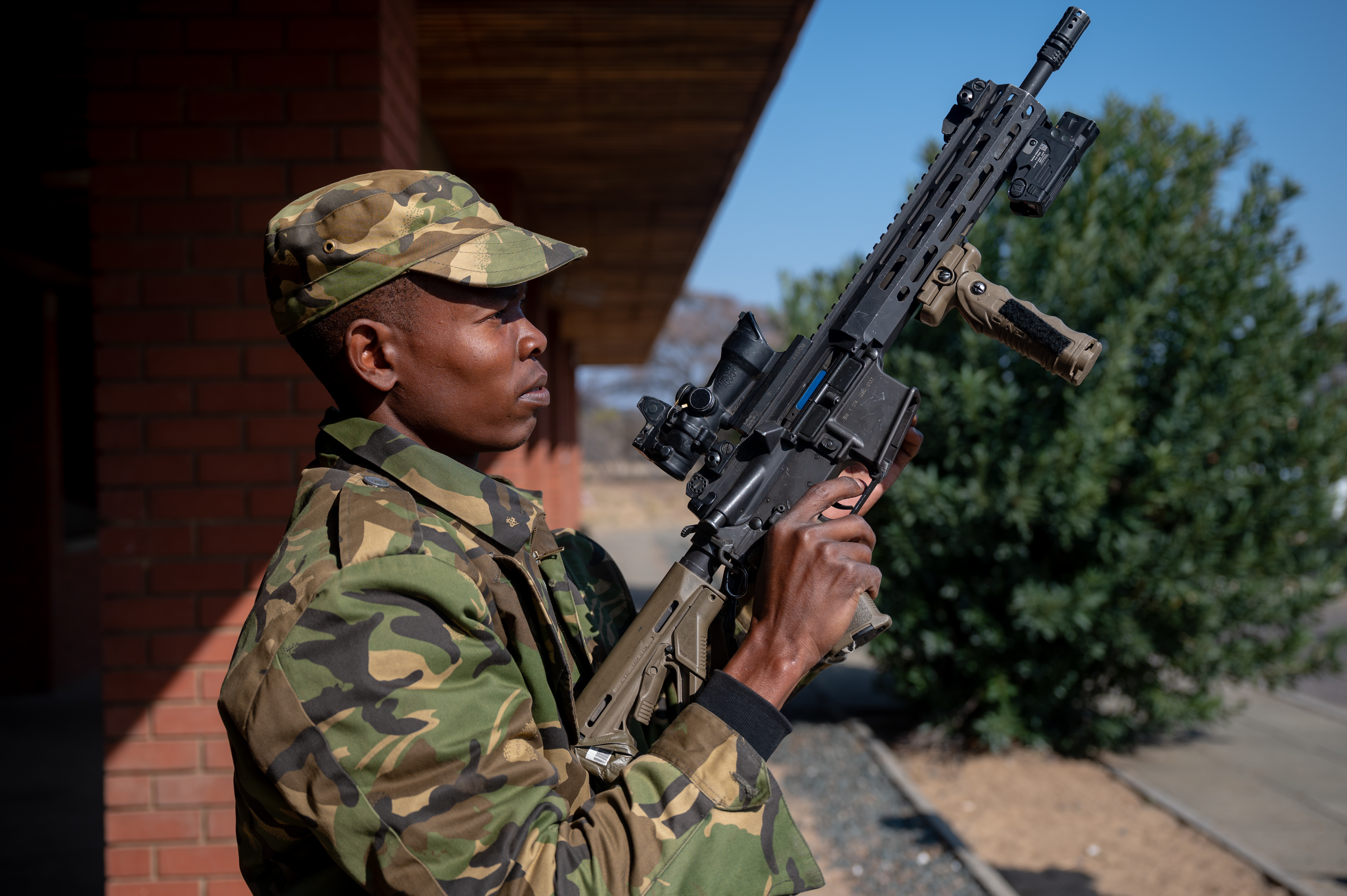
Colt Canada MRR with M-LOK rail handguard

Acknowledging shortcomings of the MOE systems, Magpul drafted M-LOK as a new and improved mounting standard which was released in 2014 replacing the existing MOE slot. The M-LOK rail specification included metric dimensions instead of imperial, and utilizes a T-slot nut capable of only 90-degree rotation, reinforced by thread-locking fluid, making it suited for applications on free-floating handguards. It was designed to work with both metal and polymer parts.

In 2016, Colt Canada developed and released the Modular Rail Rifle (MRR) that uses a monolithic upper receiver with the M-LOK attachment system.

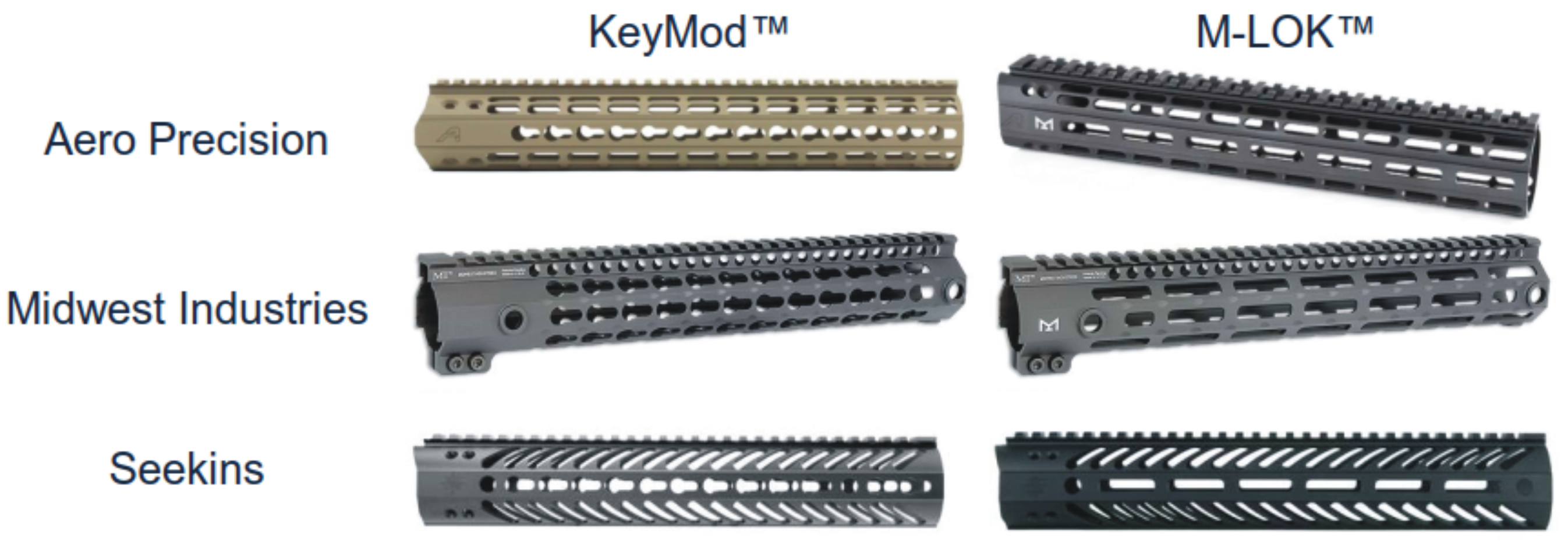
KeyMod and M-LOK handguards from various manufacturers

In 2017, several companies produce M-LOK handguards as well as accessories like Picatinny rail strips, vertical foregrips, bipods, sling adaptors, and flashlight mounts.

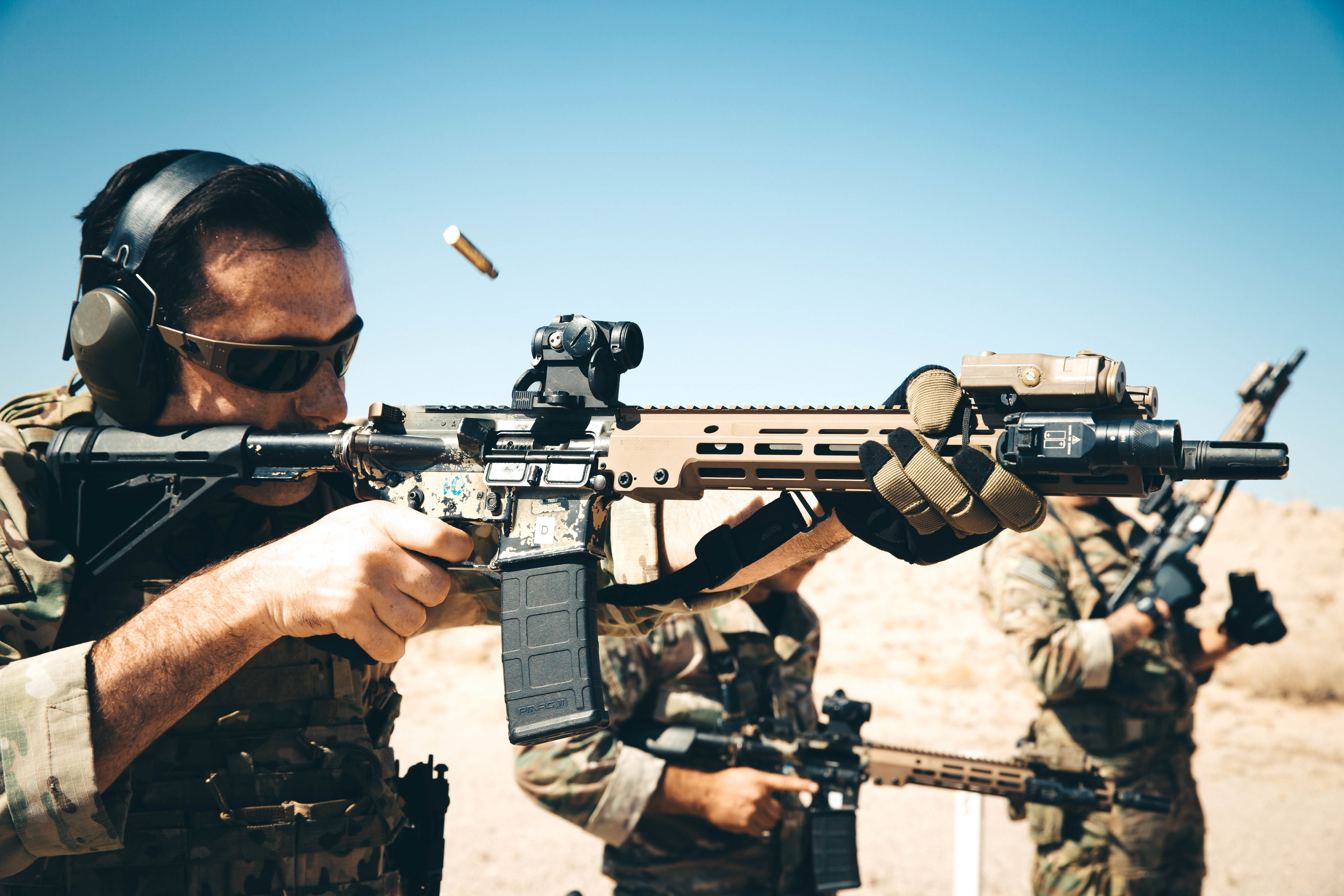
The URG-I variant M4A1 carbine has M-LOK rail handguard with an LA-5C/PEQ on the top rail used by one of the Green Berets from 3rd SFG (A) during training at Marine Corps Air Ground Combat Center, Twentynine Palms, California in 2019

In 2017, a summary report of testing conducted by NSWC-Crane for USSOCOM indicated that, while comparable in endurance and rough handling testing, M-LOK greatly outperformed Keymod in repeatability, drop testing and failure load testing.

In 2018, the Upper Receiver Group-Improved (URG-I) is a U.S. Army Special Operations Command (USASOC) program to further improve the durability and reliability of the SOPMOD Block II by introducing additional component improvements. First fielded in the same year, the main improvements are the lighter Geissele Mark 16 free-float rail that incorporates M-LOK as the mounting method and a Daniel Defense cold hammer-forged barrel that returns to the lighter "government" profile contour as well as a mid-length gas system. Used on the M4A1 carbines by ASOC then MK18 URG-I variant CQBRs by AFSOC.

On January 15, 2026, FN America announced an upgrade to FN SCAR rifles featuring M-LOK rails, a lengthened receiver, and a hydraulically buffed bolt carrier.

== Licensing ==
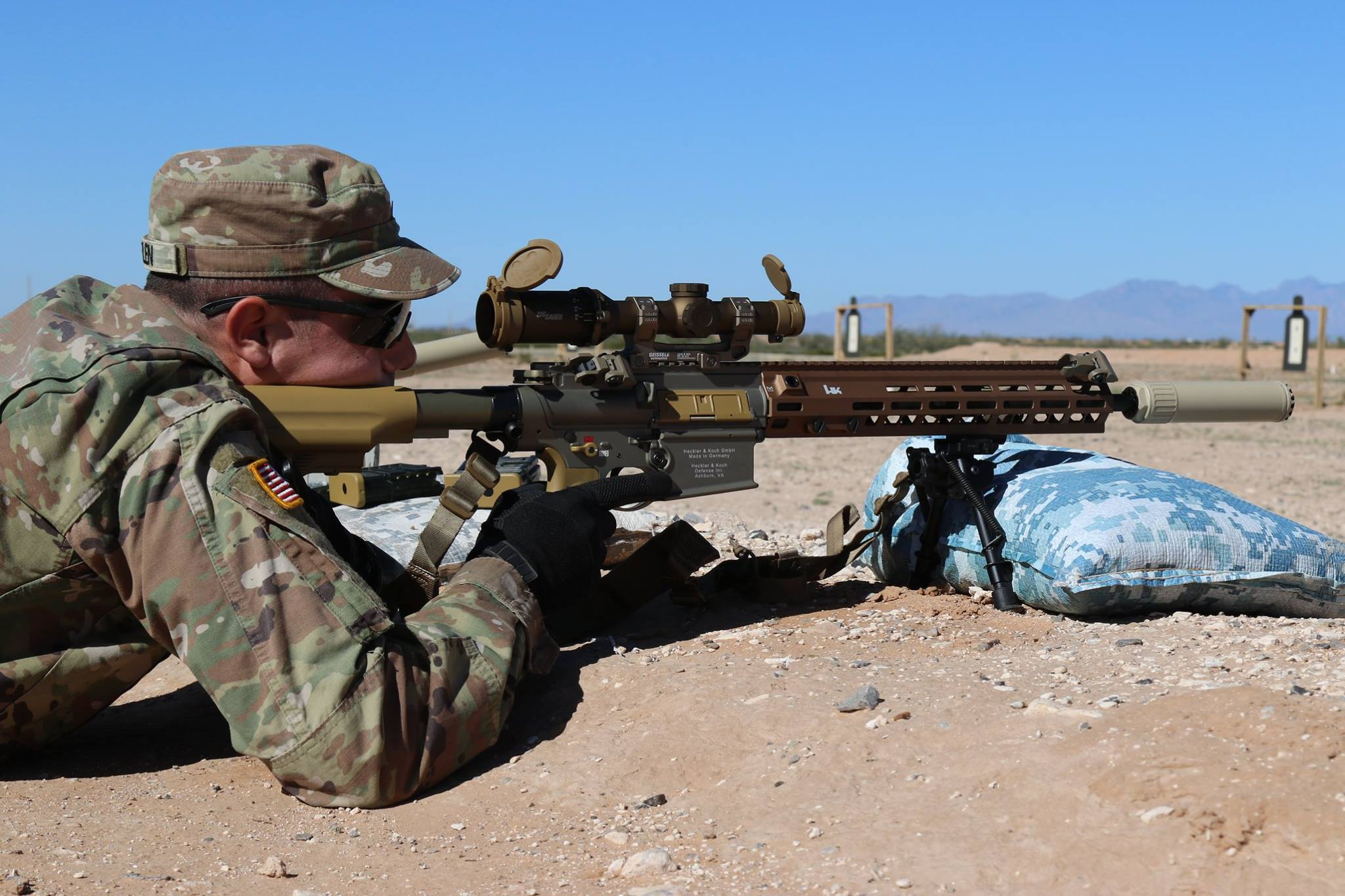
M110A1 SDMR featuring a Geissele M-LOK rail handguard

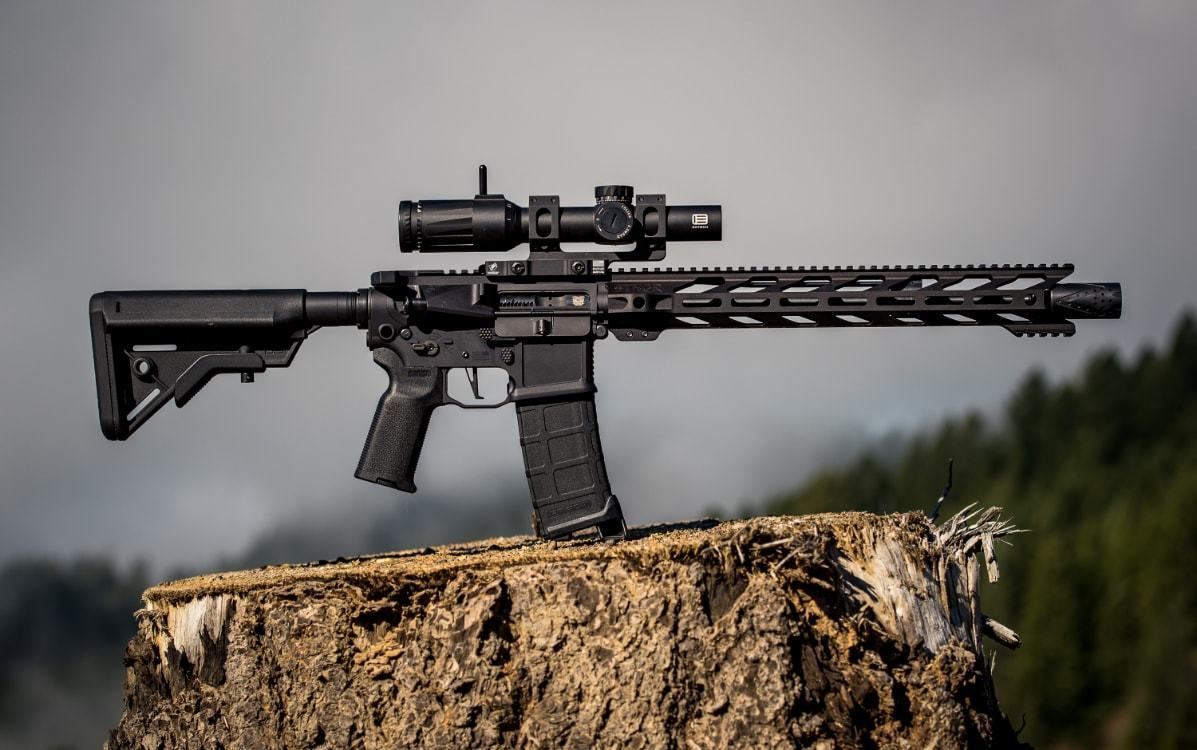
A STNGR USA 15 in (381 mm) HWK M-LOK handguard on a civilian semi-automatic AR-15 style rifle

While M-LOK is licensed free-of-charge, manufacturers must acquire a license from Magpul before making products using the M-LOK standard. Magpul claims this gives them more control in assuring that all M-LOK products are made to specifications ensuring compatibility. Program participation is open to any interested manufacturer.

Note that although Magpul describes the license as a "free license", the meaning does not match the more common meaning. A "free license" in software (where the term is commonly used) typically refers to a freedom to use, modify, and redistribute a copyrighted work while Magpul only conditionally offers the license, but with no fee once offered.

== Technical specifications ==
=== Rail specifications ===
The slot dimensions (used on handguards, etc.) are available on the web. The slots provide metric 20 mm (0.79 in) length intervals, and accessories can be mounted either within a slot or bridging between slots, making it possible to adjust the position of accessories in smaller intervals than the length of the slot. The slots on an M-Lok handguard are approximately 32 mm (1.260 in) long and 7 mm (0.276 in) wide and space 8 mm (0.315 in) from each other. The radius of the corners is approximately 2.38 mm (0.094 in).

=== Attachment specifications ===
The quarter-turn T-slot nuts have different torque specifications depending on the handguard material:

- 4.0 N⋅m (35 lb⋅in) for attaching metal accessories to metal handguards.
- 1.7 N⋅m (15 lb⋅in) for attaching polymer or metal accessories to polymer handguards.
- 1.7 N⋅m (15 lb⋅in) for attaching polymer accessories to metal handguards.

Attachment screws made by many U.S. manufacturers are often either #8-32 TPI or 10-24 TPI UNC threads, which respectively have major thread diameters of 0.1640 inches and 0.1900 inches (4.166-0.794 mm and 4.826-1.058 mm expressed in metric designation). Many M-LOK screws on the international market instead use either M4 or M5 metric threads to reduce cost.

The tool required for mounting, in addition to the thread size, also depends the screw head type. Hex keys are used extensively in the firearms industry, but metric and imperial hex keys as a general rule are not compatible. It is possible to damage the tool and screw by selecting a tool that is too small for the fastener, which can be done by using an imperial tool on a metric fastener, or the converse. An exception to this is 4 mm hex keys, which are almost the exact same size as 5/32 in (3.97 mm). In many industries, this makes 4.0 mm (5/32 in) hex keys preferred for consumer products because end users can successfully use an imperial key on a metric fastener, and vice versa.

	Hex key spanner (wrench) size	
Thread type	Socket head cap screw	• Flat head counter- sunk cap screw • Button head cap screw
M4	3 mm	2.5 mm
M5	4 mm	3 mm
#8-32	9/64" (3.57 mm)	3/32" (2.38 mm)
#10-24	5/32" (3.97 mm)	1/8" (3.18 mm)

While screw and slot dimensions are available on the web, the T-slot nut dimensions are currently under review by the US State Department to determine whether it should be regulated by ITAR, and until it is clarified drawings are only available to US citizens.

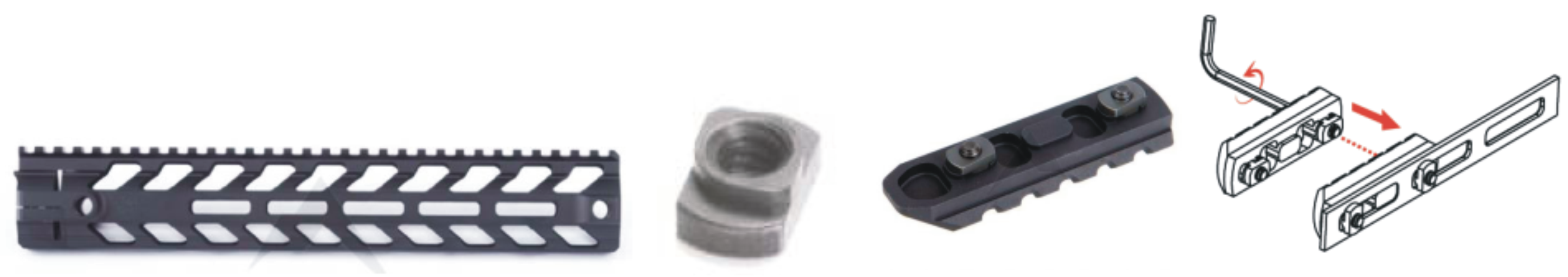
M-LOK handguard and attachment parts

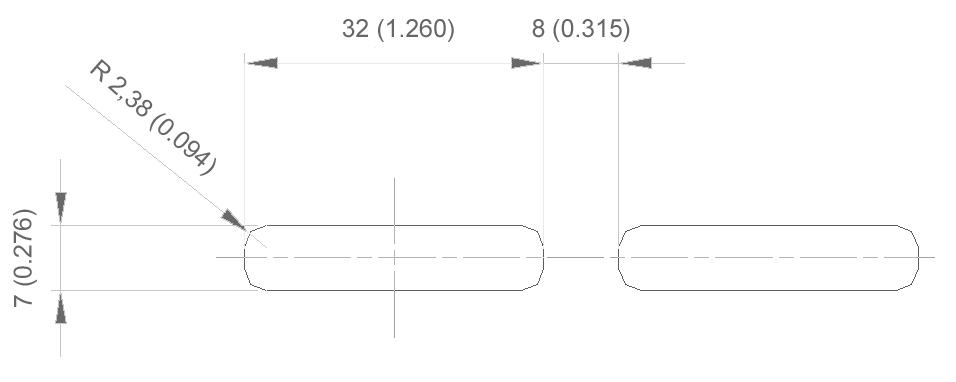
M-LOK approximate slot dimensions. (Primary measurements in millimeters, inches in parentheses.)

== See also ==
- KeyMod—competing standard open standard design to M-LOK for mounting accessories
- NATO Accessory Rail—further development from the MIL-STD-1913
- Picatinny rail (MIL-STD-1913)—improved and standardized version of the Weaver mount. Used for both for scope mounts, and for accessories (such as extra sling mounts, vertical grips, bipods etc.) Major popularity in the civilian market.
- Rail Integration System—generic term for a system for attaching accessories to small firearms
- SOPMOD
- UIT rail—an older standard used for mounting slings particularly on competition firearms
- Weaver rail mount—early system used for scope mounts, still has some popularity in the civilian market
- Zeiss rail—a ringless scope mounting standard
