= Remington Model 552 =

Remington Model 552 "Speedmaster"
- Type: Rifle
- Place of origin: United States

Production history
- Designer: L.R. Crittendon, E.W. Hailston
- Manufacturer: Remington Arms
- Produced: 1957–2020

Specifications
- Mass: 5.75 lb (2.61 kg)
- Length: 40 in (100 cm)
- Barrel length: 22 in (56 cm)
- Cartridge: .22 Short, .22 Long, .22 LR

The Remington Model 552 Speedmaster is a blow-back operated, self-loading, semi-automatic rifle that can fire .22 Short, .22 Long and .22 long rifle cartridges. Ammunition is fed from a tubular magazine under the barrel.

== History ==
Designed by Remington engineers L.R. Crittendon and E.W. Hailston, and first introduced in 1957, the model 552 features a self-loading action utilizing a charging handle on the left side of the receiver. Two trim levels were offered over the years: the standard or ADL and the higher priced BDL with a checkered walnut stock, upgraded sights, and a gloss finish. The rifle is equipped with both open sights and a 3/8" (9.5 mm) dovetail rail for mounting a scope and a safety on the trigger guard. The Speedmaster was manufactured from 1957 to 1988 in standard (ADL) trim, and the BDL from 1966 to 2020. In 1966 Remington offered the 'Speedmaster' with a special stamping of the company's 150th anniversary on the left side of the receiver.

In 1991, the walnut butt stock of the BDL Deluxe version was altered to incorporate a Monte Carlo comb to improve cheek weld when using the rifle with a telescopic sight, while the impressed checkering on the butt stock and forearm was changed to machine-cut checkering. In 2017, after complaints that the Monte Carlo comb made the rifle difficult to use with open sights, Remington returned to a straight comb stock design.

The 552 BDL was discontinued in 2020 with the bankruptcy of Remington Arms Co. LLC, ending all production of the 552 Speedmaster.

== Operation and Features ==
The 552 utilizes standard blowback operation with an unlocked steel bolt moving within an aluminum receiver.

Unlike its predecessors, the Models 550 and 550-1, the 552 does not incorporate a floating chamber in order to fire different .22 rimfire cartridges. Instead, the design features a lighter weight bolt and a longer-than-normal recoil spring with a tailored spring rate rate to reduce mass and aid in functioning with the .22 Short cartridge. When firing more powerful .22 Long and Long Rifle cartridges, excess energy from the bolt moving rearward is absorbed by the bolt buffer and buffer pad.
