= CZ 511 =

- A CZ 511 rifle on display
- Type: Semi-automatic rifle
- Place of origin: Czech Republic

Production history
- Manufacturer: Česká Zbrojovka Uherský Brod

Specifications
- Cartridge: .22 Long Rifle
- Action: Semi-automatic
- Feed system: 8 rounds (standard)
- Sights: open (some models); 3/8" or 11 mm dovetail rail for optional optical sights

The CZ 511 is a semi-automatic .22 LR rifle made by Česká Zbrojovka Uherský Brod at the Česká Zbrojovka Strakonice factory in Strakonice, Czech Republic. They had stopped selling the rifle to the United States at one point, but there became a high demand for them in the US, and they started to import them again. It features a walnut stock, iron sights, an 8-round detachable magazine, and an 11 mm dovetail rail on the receiver to mount a scope on. It also has factory built-in swivels to mount a sling on.

Production of the CZ 511 and CZ 581 ended in 2010, replaced by the CZ 512 range.
