= Zeiss rail =

Rifle scope system

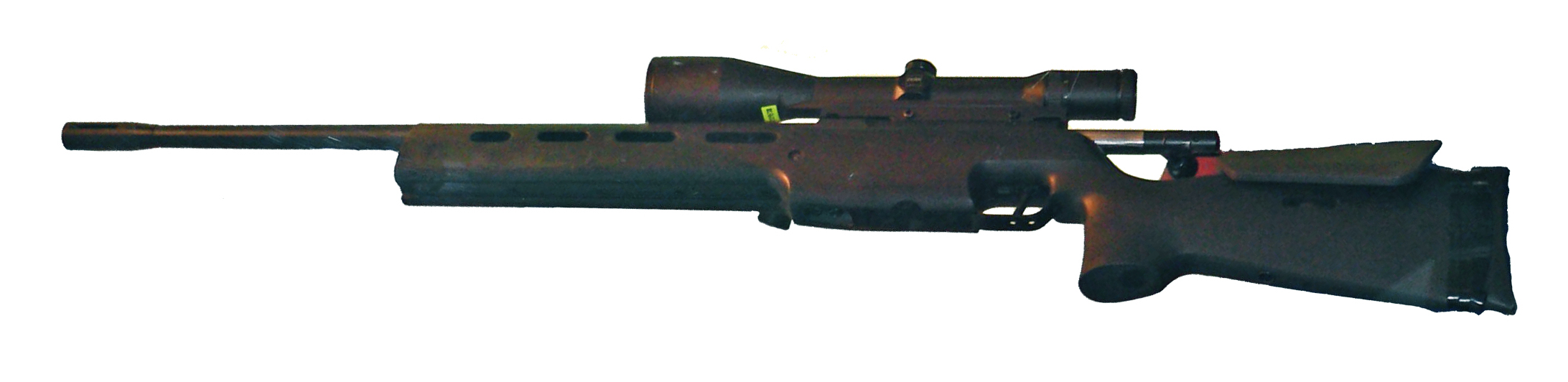
A SIG Sauer SSG 3000 bolt action rifle fitted with a Zeiss Victory Diavari 3-12x56 telescopic sight with Zeiss rail.

Zeiss inner rail, generally simply referred to as Zeiss rail, is a ringless scope sight mounting system introduced by Zeiss in 1990 as an alternative to traditional ring mounts. A patent was granted in 1992, and the patent expired in 2008. The mounting system is now also offered on sights sold by other major manufacturers, such as Blaser, Leica, Minox, Meopta, Nikon, Noblex (formerly Docter), Schmidt & Bender and Steiner. The system has so far seen most use on the European high-end market.

== History ==
Before the Zeiss rail, many European scope manufacturers used to offer a single type of standardized ringless mounting solution known as standard prism. This mounting solution was also known under names such as exterior rail, 70° prism rail or LM rail (Light Metal). Compared to ring mounts, this type of mounting rail permitted mounting without putting compression on the internal mechanics of the scope. The system allowed the shooter to place the scope at their preferred height and correct eye relief (distance to the eye), as well as the opportunity to easily move the scope between different firearms.

However, the standard prism had an aesthetic drawback in that the scope rail had to be drilled on the side for attachment screws. In case the rifle scope was to be used on different guns, new holes often had to be drilled. A motivation for developing the Zeiss rail was to avoid such drilling.

The Zeiss rail system was introduced in 1990 as an option on all Zeiss ZM/Z riflescopes, the top-of-the-line riflescope offered by Zeiss at that time. The system was later offered on the new top of line VM/V models. For these reasons, some sources have referred to the Zeiss rail system under names such as Zeiss ZM/VM rail or Zeiss M rail. Names such as Zeiss Integral rail, Zeiss 45° rail or simply Z rail have also been used.

== Technical ==
Drawing of scopes with Zeiss rail (left) and ring mount (right), both with picatinny receiver interface.

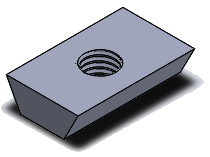
Wedge nut with metric M5 threads.

Compared to the older prism rail, the Zeiss rail does not require any drilling, and therefore provides easier mounting to the user, as well as improved aesthetics. Compatible scopes have an internal dovetail rail where two or more 45-degree wedge nuts can be slid in. For example, EAW uses wedge nuts with M5 or M4 threads. The scope mount is then attached using simple hand tools like a torx key or hex key to a torque between 4–5 N⋅m (3.0–3.7 lbf⋅ft).

=== Advantages ===
Robust mounting
Compared to ring mounts, the rail mount can hold on to the scope in stronger recoil forces without slipping.

Added stiffness
The extra material on the underside of the scope body increases stiffness and robustness. While this also increases the weight of the scope itself, it also allows for a lighter mount.

Horizontal reticle
The aiming reticle is ensured to be mounted horizontally each time.

Less chance of mounting errors
On ring mounts, overtightening of the rings is not an uncommon mounting error. This can squeeze the otherwise round tube and put stress on the inner workings of the scope, resulting in either temporary or permanent damage to its mechanical and/or optical properties. In comparison, inner rail mounts are designed to be tension-free and not put stress on the main tube. After placing the wedge nuts inside the rail, the scope mount is then attached from the outside with a force from a 22.5 degree angle on each side, resulting in a self centering design.

More flexible placement
Inner rail mounts can allow for more variations in placement on the firearm. With ring mounts, the scope adjustment knobs can put restraints on the placement of the scope. In comparison, the inner rail mount gives the user more freedom to slide the scope forwards or backwards. The stepless dovetail shaped mounting surface gives more flexibility in adjustment of distance to the shooter's eye in order to get the proper eye relief.

No ring marks
When using ring mounts, marks on the scope tube can occur. This can happen even when ring mounts are mounted with proper torque if for example either the ring mount or the scope tube itself are slightly over or undersized. Since inner rail mounts do not have rings, ring marks are avoided.

A different look
A ringless mount gives the firearm a different look which is less protrusive.

Same mount for different main tube sizes
Scopes with rail mounts do not grip around the main tube. The same rail mount can therefore be used for different scopes regardless of their main tube size. Therefore the user does not have to worry about the main tube size and compatibility with existing mounts when purchasing a new scope.

=== Disadvantages ===
Price and availability
Inner rail scope mounts are currently offered by far fewer manufacturers compared to ring mounts. For some time they have only been offered by high end European manufacturers.

Compatibility
Scopes made for other systems, such as ring mounts or other inner rail mounts, are not compatible with the Zeiss rail. Before purchase the user has to decide which system to use. These inner rails are an integral part of the scope body and can not be removed.

== Scope offerings ==
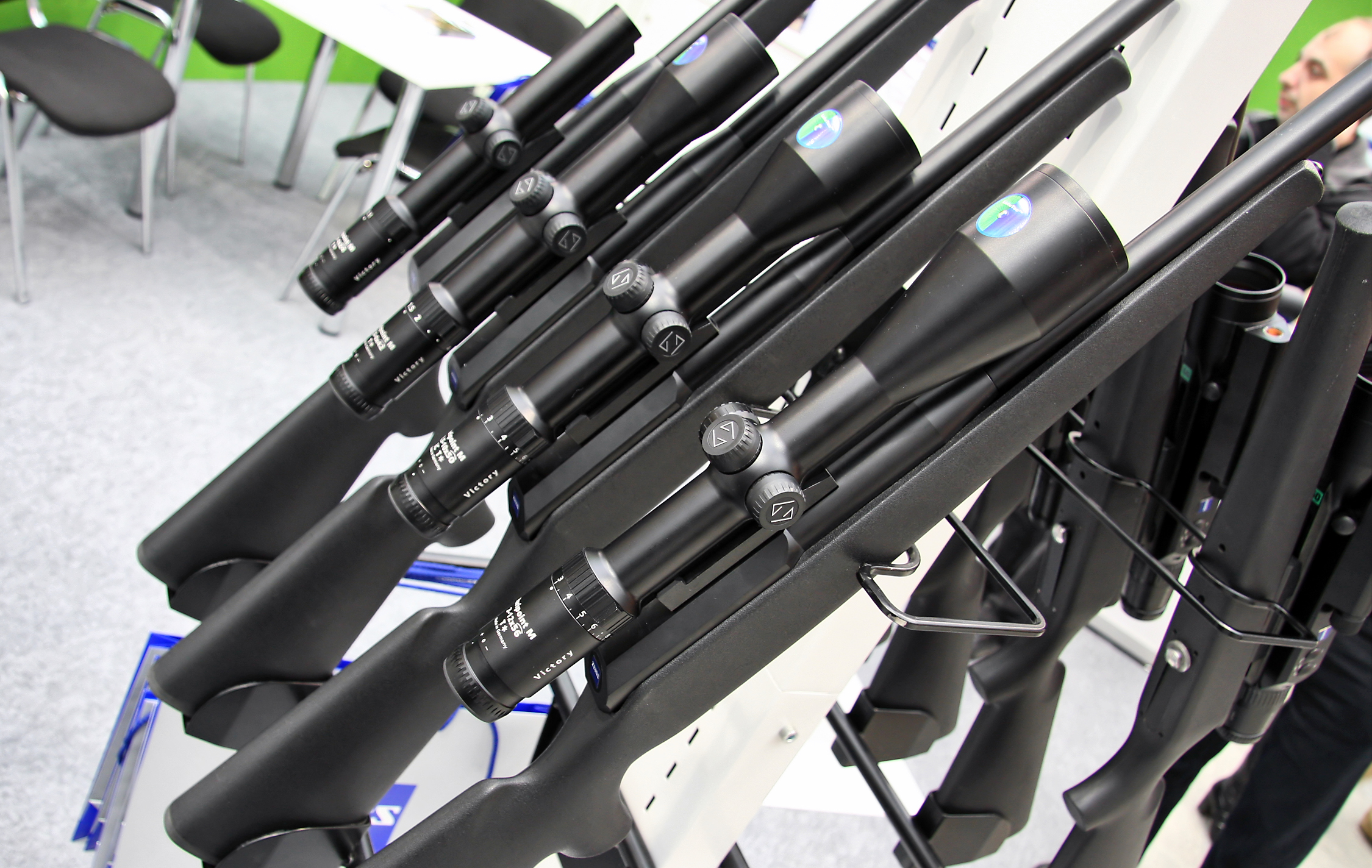
Zeiss Varipoint series telescopic sights using the Zeiss rail system

The Zeiss rail system can be found on some models from scope manufacturers such as Docter, Leica, Minox, Meopta and Schmidt & Bender, and sometimes only on high end models. Often the manufacturer will offer these models in two variations; one for traditional ring mounts, and another for the Zeiss rail mount.

There are also examples of rifle scopes that have been sold exclusively for Zeiss rail mounts (i.e. no option for a ring mount version). These include the Zeiss Victory Diarange laser rangefinder scope and the Zeiss Varipoint iC models. In late 2017, Blaser released their Infinity iC (illumination Control) line of scopes which also only uses the Zeiss rail system.

== Mount offerings ==
Aftermarket mounts compatible with the Zeiss rail system are offered by several well known manufacturers such as Blaser, EAW, Henneberger, Innomount, Kozap, MAK, Recknagel, Rusan, Uronen Precision, Virtus, and Ziegler. Both two-piece or monobloc mounts are offered.

Compatible mounts are offered in different configurations, depending on the mounting opportunities on the firearm receiver. Examples include Picatinny, Weaver or different types of claw or swing (pivot) mounts.

== Scope height calculations ==
The height placement of the scope on a rifle should be matched to the stock dimensions and personal preference. In general, a higher scope mount can give better recoil control, while a lower mount can give the firearm better balance. Especially the cheek rest and scope height together play an important role for comfortable shooting. Some cheek rests or scope mounts have adjustable height.

The following section mentions relevant terminology.

=== Mount construction height ===
The construction height of a scope mount is an important factor contributing to how high the scope will sit on a rifle. "Construction height" typically refers to only the height contribution from the mount itself, and is typically provided by the mount manufacturer. Low Zeiss rail mounts typically have a construction height between 7–9 mm (0.28–0.35 in) for traditional bolt action hunting rifles, but can be up to 23 mm (0.91 in) for modern bolt and AR-style rifles.

=== Scope body height ===
A Zeiss rail system typically adds height to the scope body, but also gives the possibility for a slimmer scope mount so that the total scope height can become comparable to a traditional ring mount. The added scope body height due to the rail piece on the scope itself contributes about 5.5 mm (0.22 in) to the total height. This can be treated like a constant term which can be added to adapt traditional scope height equations for the Zeiss rail system.

Like with traditional ring mounts, the diameter of the scope tube itself also affects the distance from the bore to the crosshair. Mainly, a larger main tube will increase the total height by half the main tube difference (a 36 mm tube will thus typically sit 3 mm higher than a 30 mm tube, all else being equal). The height contribution from the scope body, that is from the bottom of the scope body to the center of the reticle, is typically provided by the scope manufacturer, along with the ~5.5 mm constant term due to the rail piece on the scope.

=== Other considerations ===
The distance from the center of bore to the top of the receiver interface is of interest for ballistics calculations, like when constructing a ballistic table.

== Competing standards ==
Competing standards to the Zeiss rail include the Swarovski SR rail and Schmidt & Bender Convex rail. The three systems are not compatible. While the Zeiss rail has a stepless dovetail shaped mounting surface, the Swarovski SR rail has a finely toothed rail, and the S&B Convex has a smooth convex rail.

Swarovski applied for patent on their SR rail system in 2002, and introduced to the product to the market in late 2005. The Swarovski SR rail is also used by Kahles, a Swarovski subsidiary.

The Convex rail has been offered by Schmidt & Bender since at least 2005, and has also been marketed under the name LMC (Light Metal with Convex rail). Contrary to the Zeiss and Swarovski rails, which ensure a levelled reticle, the S&B Convex rail instead allows the user to tilt the reticle up to 1° (60 moa; 17.5 mrad) to the left or right. Since 2016, Schmidt & Bender has also offered the Zeiss rail system as an option on some of their hunting scope sights under the name LMZ (Light Metal with Z-rail).
