= Weaver rail mount =

Accessory mounting system in firearms

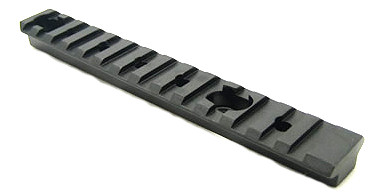
A Weaver rail

A Weaver rail mount is a system to connect telescopic sights (often via a scope mount) and other accessories to firearms and certain crossbows. It uses a pair of parallel rails and several slots perpendicular to these rails.

The later Picatinny rail, developed by the US military, is a development of the key concepts of the Weaver system, and they are partially compatible.

== History ==
The Weaver mount was developed by William Ralph Weaver (1905 – 8 November 1975) at his telescopic sight company W.R. Weaver Co., which he founded in 1930. Previous systems included the Leupold/Redfield mounts. Compared to the Leupold mount, the Weaver rail is not as strong and cannot be adjusted for windage.

W.R. Weaver Co. became Weaver Optics, and was a subsidiary of Meade Instruments Corporation from 2002 to 2008, when it was on-sold to become part of Alliant Techsystems's Security and Sporting division in Onalaska, Wisconsin.

== Features ==
Older Weaver systems used two pieces mounted a distance apart from one another, typically on the receiver of a rifle over the bolt opening, where the cartridge would be inserted and/or ejected. However, alignment problems of the two piece system can put undue stress on a rifle scope and cause problems between the scope and rifle barrel parallels and bullet Point Of Impact (POI). The two piece system must be mounted with exacting tolerances to ensure perfect alignment, using a scope alignment device called Alignment Sleeves.

The two piece type can be problematic on some rifles that do not allow for the two pieces to be mounted due to metal thickness of the receiver, or other issues of receiver length that will not allow for proper distance to hold the scope. With the later one piece approach, the rail system remains consistent in alignment.

The slots on a Weaver system are primarily used as a clearance of the locking screw that tightens the clamp to the rail. Some Weaver-type accessories have a bar that fits inside the machined slots on the rails while many others do not.

Weaver rails have a slot width of 0.180 in (4.57 mm), but are not necessarily consistent in the spacing of slot centers.

== Failings ==
The lack of a locking bar on many Weaver-type accessories lends to another alignment issue: side-to-side canting. Although this issue is not common, it can be very problematic especially with scopes. Because scopes need to be mounted to a rifle in perfect parallel to the barrel, and to ensure the cross hairs indicate a point of aim (POA) exactly at a bullet's point of impact (POI) at a known distance, a small variation of even one quarter of one degree can cause significant problems at longer ranges. The locking bar holds the mount in a perfect 90 degrees to the rail system, whereas a non-locking bar system can cant to the left or right.

This canting, sometimes called jamming of surfaces, is caused by not matching the clamping surface perfectly to the rail. When tightened down, stress exerted on the base can cause the scope's POA to be off from the POI by as much as several feet at 100–200 yards, and gets progressively worse with greater distance. Lower grade materials used in manufacturing of scope bases, inconsistent design tolerances from one manufacturer to another, and other factors can cause twisting stress and cause the mount to move out of parallel with the rifle barrel. The locking bar system allows for even stress to be distributed and prevent canting of the scope mount.

Another form of scope canting is caused by the rings themselves. Many Weaver-type mounts, including many Picatinny-type scope rings and even the Redfield Type, have either two or four screws on top of the scope ring that hold the scope in place. Both the Weaver and Picatinny clamp systems have a screw side and a clamp side. With the two-screw style, the ring usually aligns well but does not have the strength of the four screw system. Many times, when tightening the screws of the four screw type, the scope can twist in place, causing misalignment. Tightening the mounts in an “X” pattern and usually starting opposite of the outside clamp side. Holding the scope slightly to the opposite side while tightening the screws usually allows for proper alignment of the scope to barrel parallel.

== Compatibility with Picatinny ==
The military standard, MIL-STD-1913 "Picatinny rails" date from the mid-1990s and have very strict military standard dimensions and tolerances. The Picatinny rail has a similar profile to the Weaver, but the recoil groove width of the Picatinny rail is 0.206 in (5.23 mm) versus 0.180 in (4.57 mm) of the Weaver rail/mount, and by contrast with the Weaver, the spacing of the Picatinny recoil groove centers is consistent, at 0.394 in (10.01 mm).

Many rail-grabber-mounted accessories can be used on either type of rail, and accessories designed for a Weaver system will always (SWP) fit Picatinny rails – although not vice versa because the Picatinny locking slot width is 0.206 in (5.232 mm) vs the .180 width of the Weaver, and the spacing of slot centers is 0.394 in (10.008 mm). Because of this, with devices that use only one locking slot, Weaver devices will fit on Picatinny rails, but Picatinny devices will not always fit on Weaver rails.

Another difference is that Weaver rails are continuous with only two to four recoil grooves cut, while Picatinny rails have recoil grooves cut across the entire length of the rail at the above noted spacing (like a dotted line). This allows for more mounting position flexibility and also helps to neutralize expansion caused by barrel heating.

== See also ==
- Rail integration system
