= Biathlon rifle =

Rifle used within the sport of biathlon

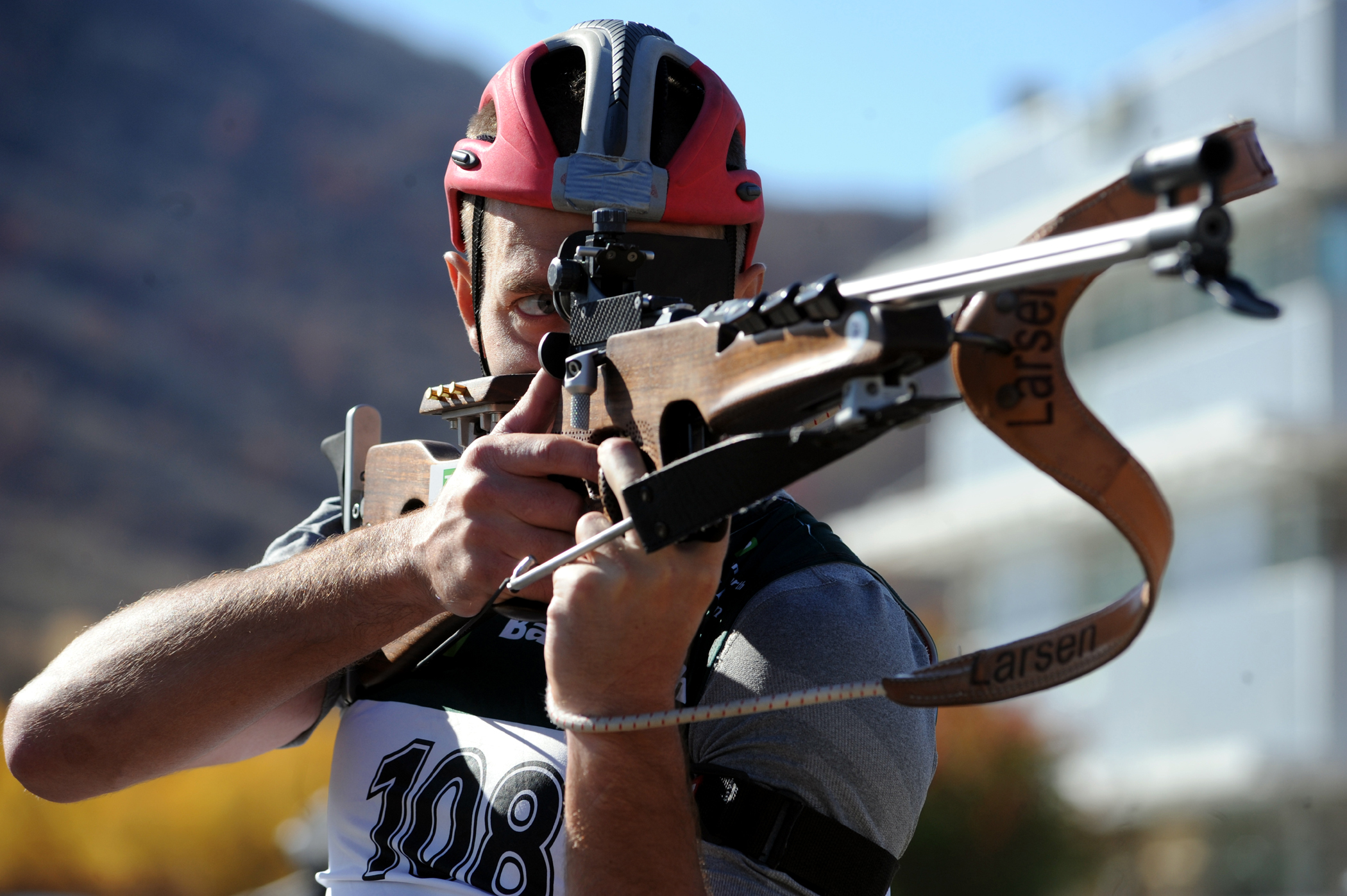
Three-time Olympian Jeremy Teela practices shooting with his Anschütz Fortner rifle at a summer biathlon event in Utah, USA.

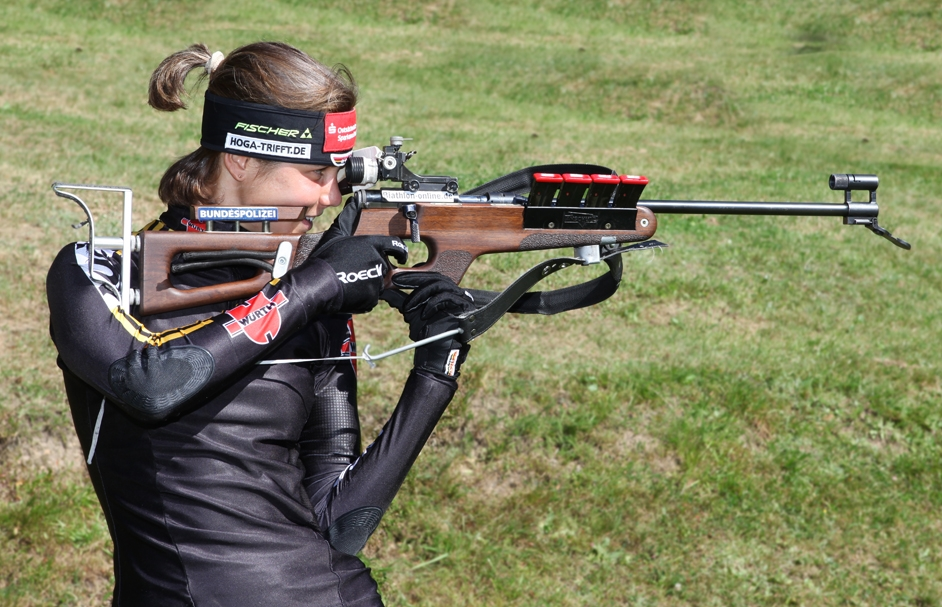
German Tina Bachmann with her Anschütz Fortner biathlon rifle in .22 Long Rifle. Notice her support hand holding against a raiser block.

A biathlon rifle is a specialized rifle designed for use in a biathlon event. Specialist biathlon rifles are usually equipped with straight-pull actions, integrated magazine carriers, and ergonomic stock designs suitable for both prone and standing positions.

== Sanctioning bodies ==
Biathlon rifles are usually built to comply with technical regulations of a competition sanctioning body. The most well known is the International Biathlon Union (IBU), which holds competitions in winter biathlon, which is part of the Winter Olympics, as well as summer biathlon events.

Other biathlon sanctioning bodies and their competitions include:

- Finnish Hunters' Association: Moose Biathlon and Moose Shooting with Cross-Country Running.
- International Shooting Sport Federation: Target Sprint.
- International Military Sports Council (CISM): Military patrol, as well as biathlon based on IBU rules.
- International Biathlon Orienteering Federation: Orienteering shooting.
- Nordic Field Biathlon and Nordic shooting with cross-country running, arranged by the National Rifle Association of Norway and the Swedish Shooting Sport Federation.

== Technical ==
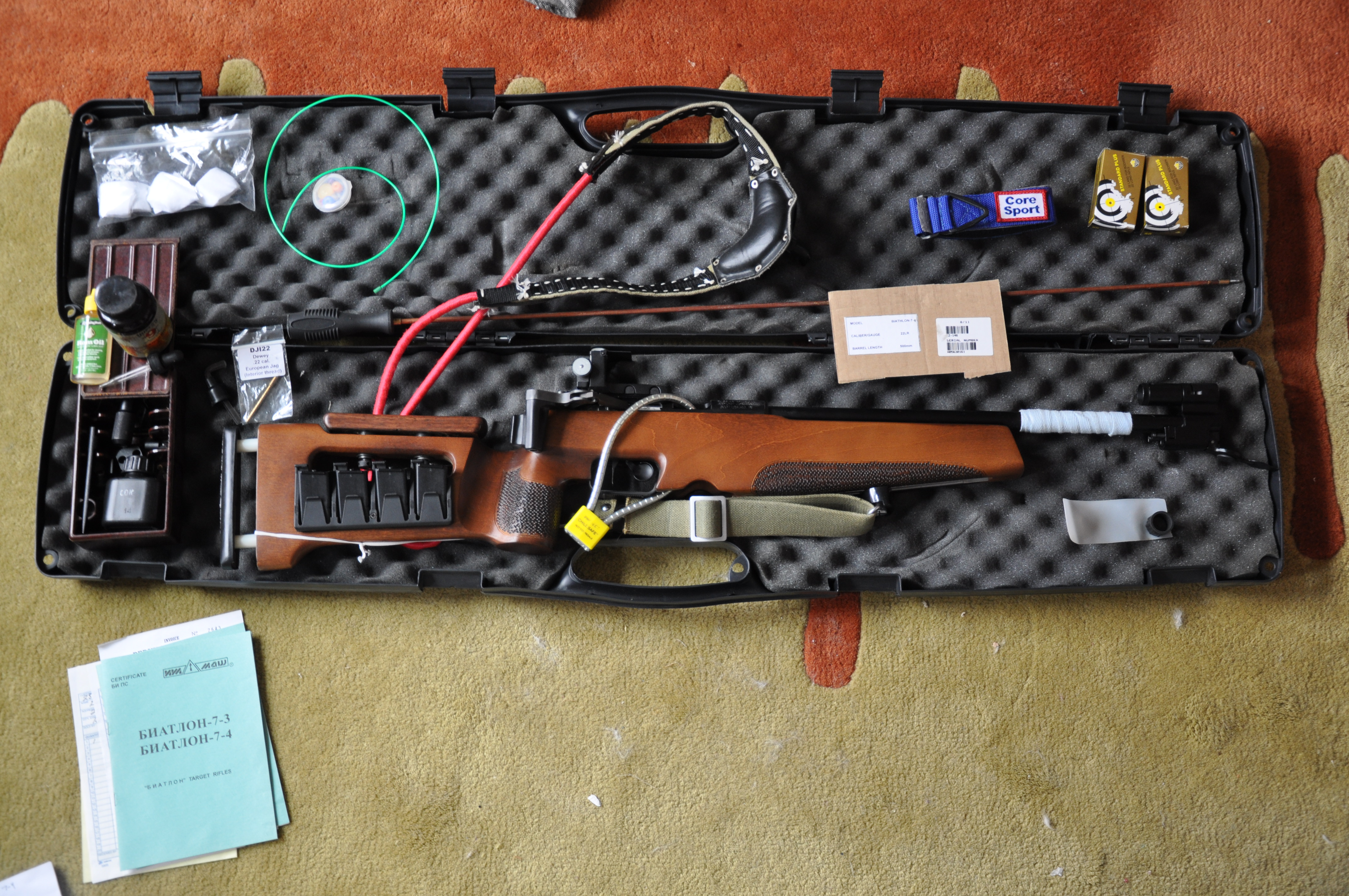
Izhmash 7-4 biathlon rifle in a transport case.

=== Stock ===
Biathlon stocks tend to be built for performance, and often have some unique ergonomic design features compared to traditional rifle stocks. One of these features is the shape of the pistol grip, which often has a distinct thumb rest, allowing the thumb of the firing hand to rest pointing upwards. This helps isolate the movement of the trigger finger from the movement of the thumb, which are known to have a tendency to move together as a form of sympathetic reflex. Biathlon stocks are often ergonomically shaped for both the prone and standing position, and often have a distinct raiser block for the standing position. To aid in prone shooting, a hand-stop is often attached to the stock, as well as pouches for carrying extra magazines and modules for carrying extra single rounds.

=== Carrying harness and sling ===
The shooting sling is usually only attached to the hand stop of the rifle, and has a hook which quickly can be attached to the athlete's arm before shooting and detached before skiing.

The carrying harness is usually attached both to the harness rail located on the front of the rifle and butt of the stock allowing the athlete to comfortably carry the rifle on the back. The carrying harness usually does not double as a shooting support. The carrying harness is designed to let the biathlete carry the rifle with minimal hindrance, and in such a way, increase performance in the ski track.

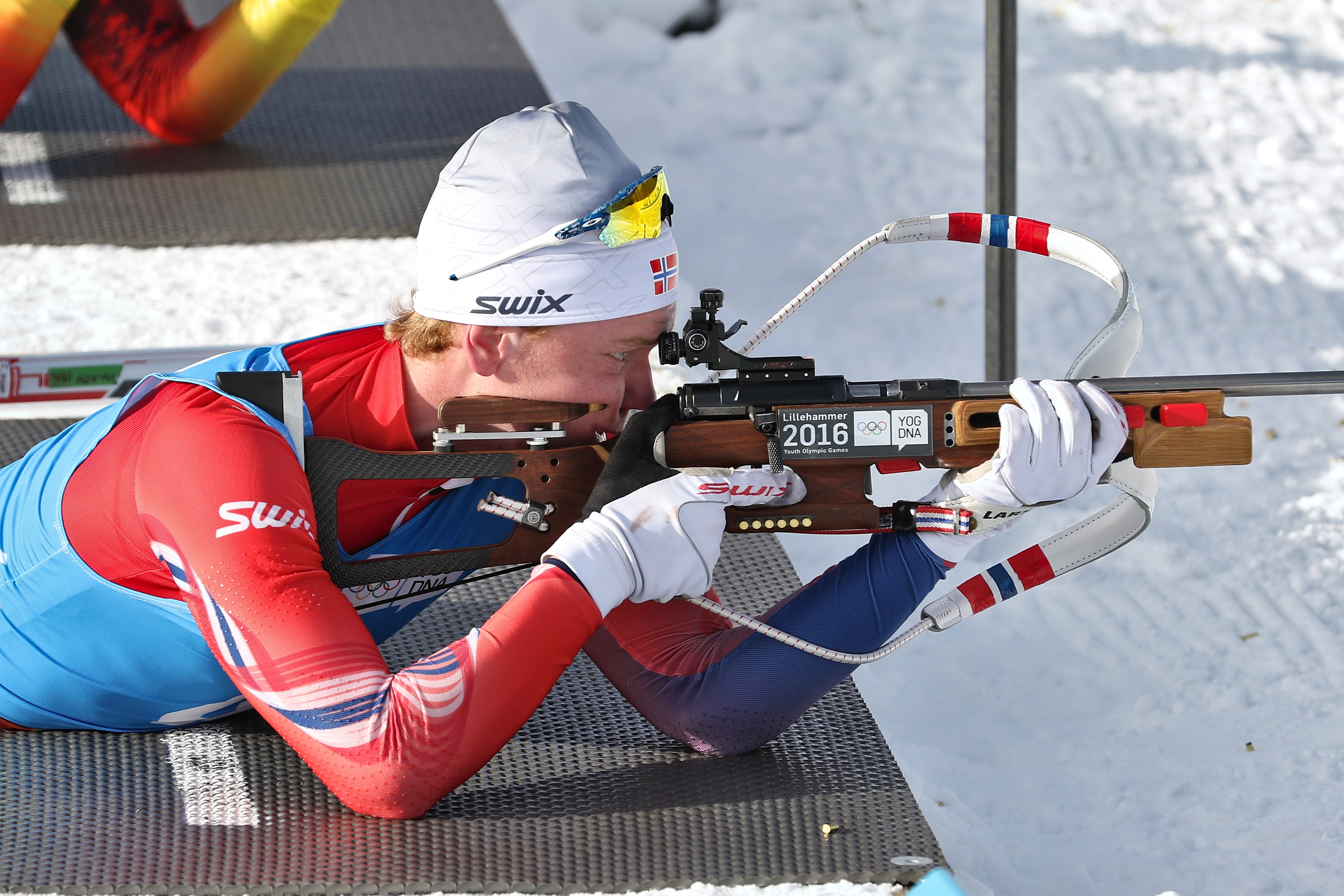
Prone shooting utilizing the hand stop and shooting sling. (Notice the carrying harness not being used as a shooting sling).

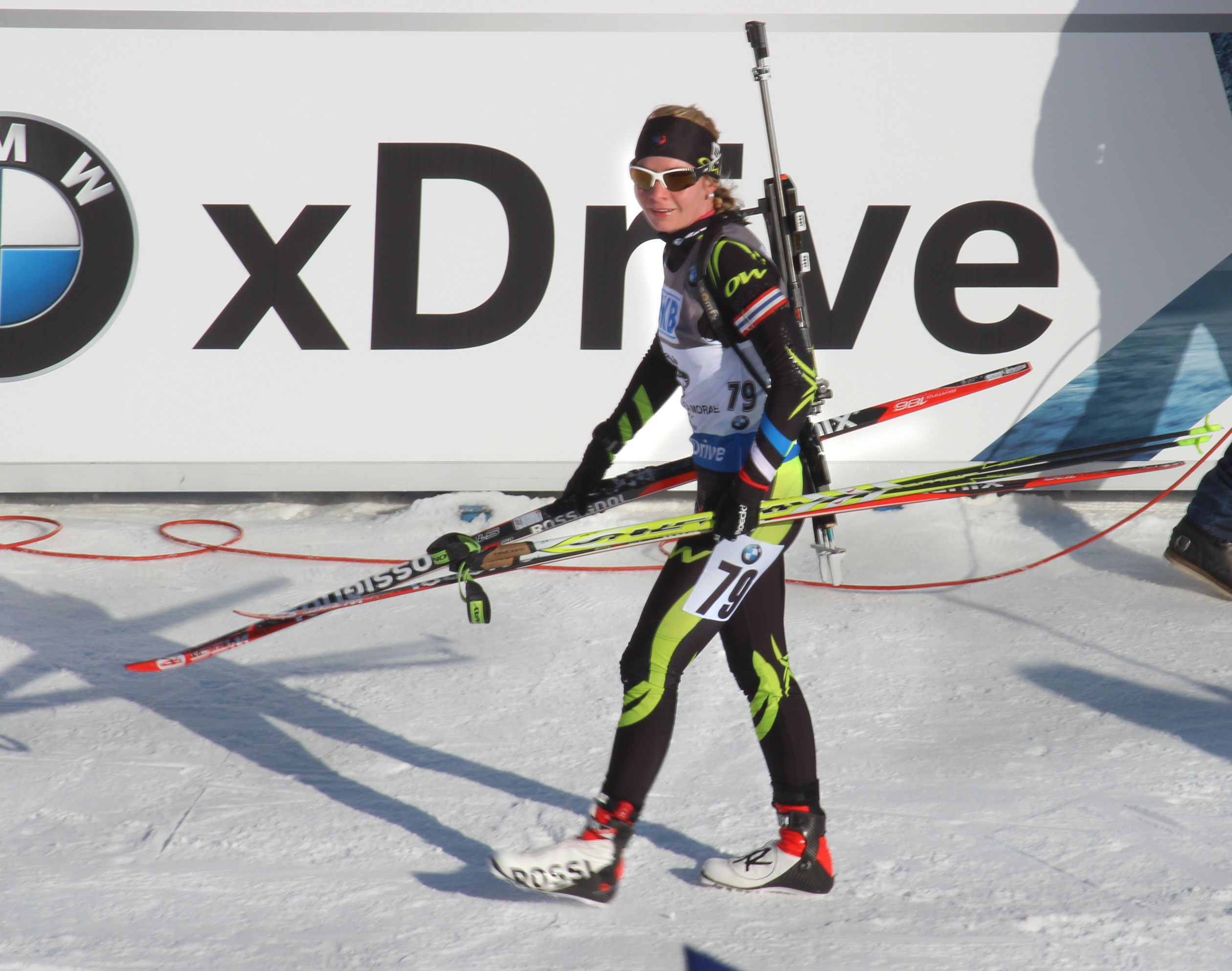
Competitor transporting the rifle on the back using a carrying harness.

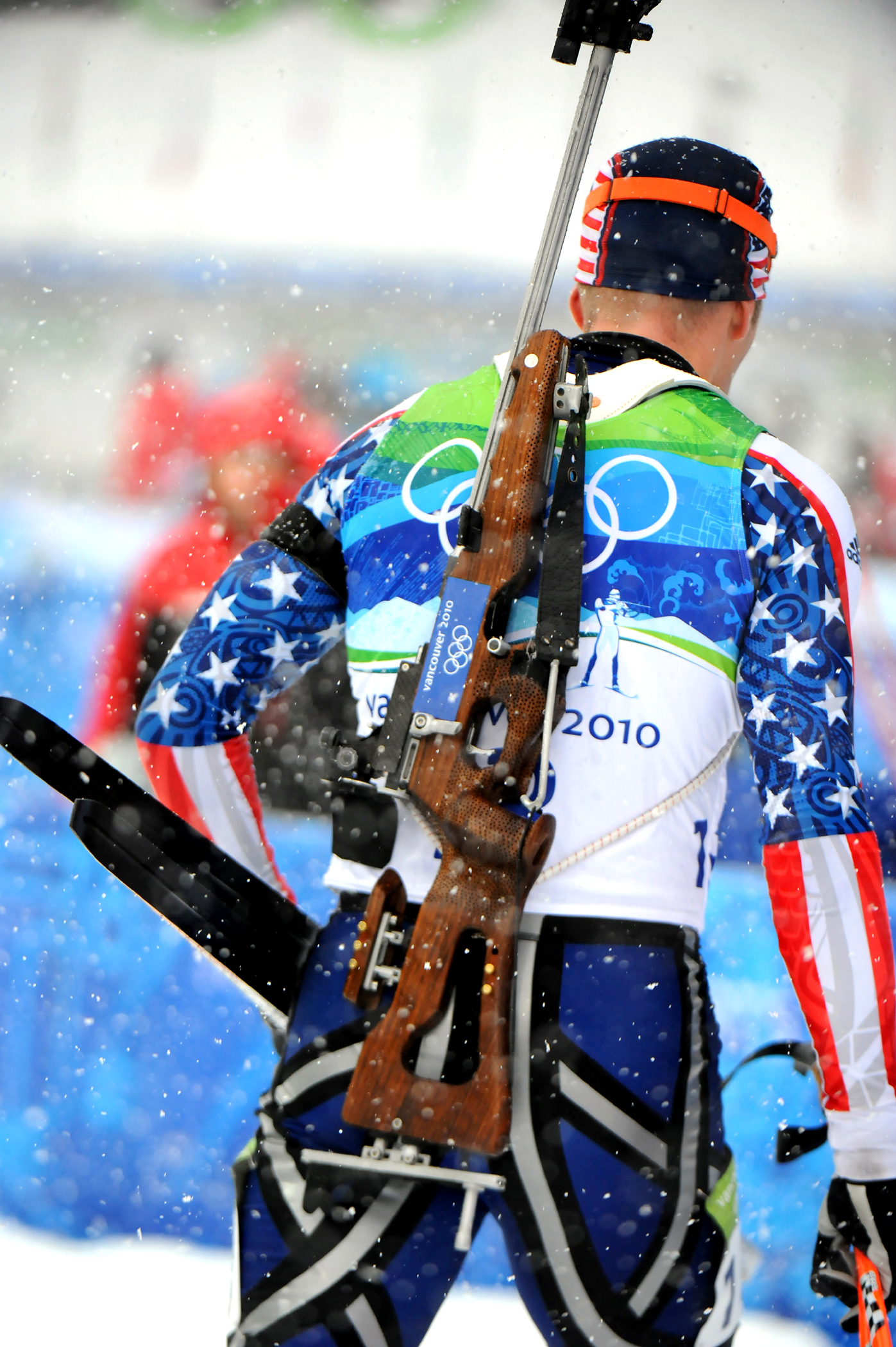
US Biathlete at the 2010 Winter Olympics.

=== Equipment weight limit ===
For IBU competitions, the total weight of the unloaded rifle has to be between 3.5 and 7.5 kg (7.7 and 16.5 lb). The current weight limit was established around the 1986 season after Glen Eberle showed the world a new and lighter stock design. At that time olympic biathlon rifles usually weighed well over 5 kg, and it was a common belief that a rifle needed to be somewhat heavy in order to be stable enough to shoot accurately, particularly with the fast heart rate and shortness of breath experienced during a biathlon race. Another contribution to the relatively high weight was to make the stocks stronger, since biathlon stocks commonly were known to be at risk of breaking around the pistol grip area when the athlete fell. Eberle set out to make a stronger and lighter design, and received a research grant from the United States Olympic Committee. He consulted engineers, biomechanical experts and NASA scientists, and the work resulted in a design which combined wood of Sitka spruce and carbon fiber composite materials. This resulted in a biathlon stock that was 1.6 kg lighter than any on the market, a substantial weight saving on a 20 km biathlon race. In addition to being easier to carry while skiing, Eberle also felt he had demonstrated that an athlete with a lightweight, but well balanced and ergonomically correct rifle, would shoot better than with the conventional heavy rifles. The Eberle stock quickly became popular, with most athletes competing with either the Eberle stock or similar designs. After some initial resistance, the world biathlon governing body accepted the new low weight design, and used it as a standard for the current 3.5 kg limit.

It is not uncommon for athletes to add extra weights to the front of the barrel (i.e. 100 grams), thereby making for steadier aiming by moving the balance point of the rifle forward.

=== Action and trigger ===
Straight pull and toggle actions are popular. In IBU competitions, conventional bolt actions are still used to some extent, but usually only as an affordable alternative for beginners. IBU rules require that the trigger pull weight must be at least 500 g (1.1 lb). A manual safety is not required.

Fullbore bolt-action rifles are typically used in moose biathlon and Nordic field biathlon competitions. Nordic field biathlon rules stipulate a minimum trigger pull of 1,500 g (3.3 lb) in the diopter classes, and 1,000 g (2.2 lb) in the scope classes.

During skiing, the bolt is normally kept closed to prevent snow from entering the action either due to precipitation or in case the athlete falls. Snow entering the action could cause issues with precision or with cycling the action, or in the worst case cause a safety issue.

=== Ammunition ===
Smallbore biathlon rifles used today are usually chambered for the .22 LR (5.6×15 mmR) cartridge. Temperatures below 0 °C (32 °F) can have a significant effect on the reliability and accuracy of most rimfire firearms and ammunition, and some manufacturers therefore certify their production rifles by recording group sizes at for example −20 and 20 °C (−4 and 68 °F). Special purpose cold weather biathlon ammunition is also available, and the ammunition lot used should ideally also be cold-tested in the particular rifle to ensure that the combination of rifle and ammunition gives a good precision.

IBU competitions, such as in biathlon at the Winter Olympics, uses the .22 LR cartridge only. The cartridge was standardized for IBU biathlon competitions in 1978. Current rules require that the muzzle velocity must not exceed 360 m/s, and the bullet must weigh between 2.55 and 2.75 grams. .22 LR is also the only approved cartridge in the Nordic field biathlon smallbore class. The .17 HMR cartridge is permitted in the moose biathlon smallbore class, and is predominant due to better ballistics at 100 meters.

In fullbore moose biathlon and Nordic field biathlon, 6.5×55 mm and .308 Winchester are the most common cartridges. Any cartridge up to 8×57mm is permitted in the scope class of Nordic field biathlon, however, the cartridge should be suitable for the targets and firing distances, which can be 1 mrad (3.4 moa) sized targets anywhere from 100 to 600 meters.

=== Sights ===
The sights need to be rugged in order to keep the zero in case the competitor falls, and often have added protection to keep snow from entering the sight.

In IBU competitions, only non-magnified diopter rear and globe front sights are permitted. Most classes in Nordic field biathlon are also restricted to diopter sights. A blinder or eyecup is often used instead of eye protection, but this is an optional feature. Globe front sight inserts used in IBU competitions usually have aperture openings between 2.8 and 3.4 mm. Most Russian rear sights are adjusted following the counterclockwise (CCW) convention, while German diopter sights often are adjusted clockwise (CW).

Scope sights are permitted in moose biathlon competitions, as well as in the scope class in Nordic field biathlon. In moose biathlon, the shooting is performed standing at a distance of 100 meters. Magnification of the scope sight can be chosen at the preference of the competitor. For example, scopes with variable magnification between 4-12 or 8-20 are common. Experienced competitors have a tendency to shoot with the scope set to a higher magnification than beginners. In Nordic ski field shooting, the firing distances can be the same as in Nordic field shooting, i.e. between 100 and 600 meters.

The amount of sight adjustment performed with one click varies with type of firearm. Competition air and smallbore rifles typically have finer sight adjustments. In fullbore biathlon, both optical and iron sights usually have 0.1 mrad (0.3 MOA) adjustments.

=== Barrel length ===
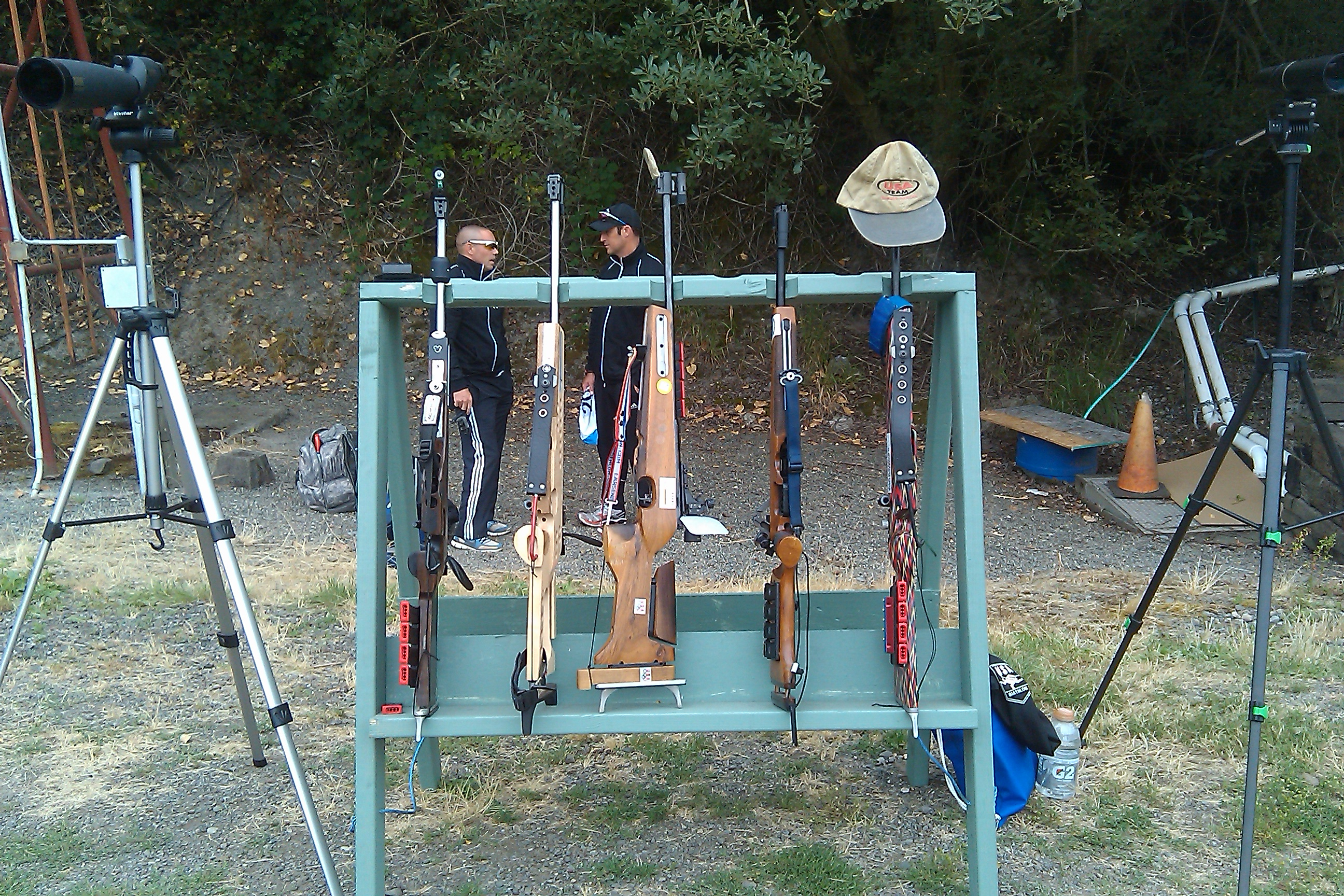
Various biathlon rifles of different lengths placed in a rifle rack.

In IBU, the competition rules does not specify the barrel length and total length of the firearm, and firearms designers have therefore optimized these parameters to achieve optimal and stable performance from the ammunition across different weather conditions. Barrel lengths are usually around 50 to 55 cm (20 to 22 in), and the overall length is usually around 1 m (39 in). Many .22 LR barrels used in biathlon feature a choked (constricted) muzzle, presumably to achieve better performance in cold weather. Choked muzzles are also commonly seen in other high precision competition rifles, like in free rifle (ISSF 50 meter prone and three positions).

In moose biathlon, barrel length must be within the legal requirements for hunting moose. In the Nordic field biathlon diopter class, only three standard barrel lengths are approved (67, 70 and 74 cm (26, 28 and 29 in)). No barrel length restrictions apply to the scope class in Nordic field biathlon.

=== Maintenance ===
Maintenance of biathlon rifles in general follows the common principles of firearm maintenance. This includes checking that all screws are properly tightened (stock, action, sights, sling, carrying harness and accessories), inspecting the stock for cracks and lubricating all gliding parts.

After long use of .22 LR rifles, lead deposits can have a tendency to build up in the receiver, which can require more thorough cleaning once in a while to ensure continued precision and smooth operation without jams. A dirty action is seldom an issue on fullbore biathlon rifles, except for some self loading designs.

Some special considerations include if the biathlon rifle has been used in cold temperatures, in which case condensation may form on the cold surfaces of the firearm when it is taken inside. Wet weather may also cause moisture on the firearm. In such cases, it is common to dry and "acclimatize" the firearm in room temperature for a short while (i.e. an hour) before applying lubricant. The bolt and any snow covers should then be left open to help remove moisture.

During a competition, the exchange of a broken firearm to a spare one is only possible after inspection and with the permission of the Range Master.

== Models ==
=== Smallbore ===
Anschütz

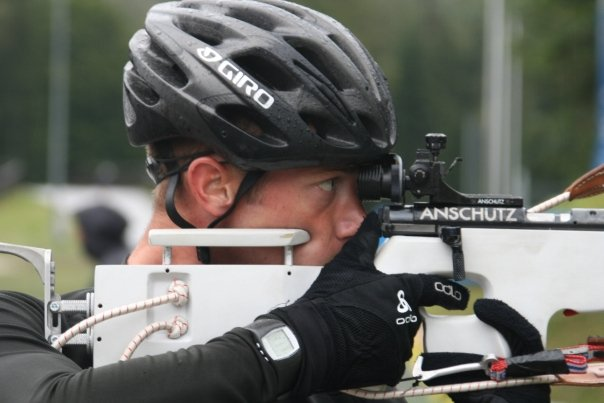
British biathlete Ben Woolley firing with his Anschütz Fortner biathlon rifle during a summer biathlon training in 2008 or 2009.

The current sport standard is the Anschütz 1827 Fortner, which is reported to be used by an estimated 97% of biathlon competitors worldwide.

The design dates back to 1984, when Peter Fortner was having beers with Peter Angerer from West Germany who recently had taken the individual biathlon gold at the 1984 Winter Olympics. Angerer expressed that he wanted a rifle which could match those used by Soviet and East German competitors. Fortner took the challenge and within a few months developed and patented what was to become known as the "Fortner action", with the 1827 Fortner introduced around 1984. The Fortner action is produced by Fortner Waffen under licence from Anschütz, and are marketed as Anschütz rifles.

The 1827F has a lock time around 1.7 milliseconds, giving a total time of around 4 milliseconds from activation of trigger to the bullet exiting the barrel. The straight pull mechanism uses 6 ball bearings to lock the bolt. The action has an external safety.

The main competitor to the Anschütz 1827F today is the 7-3 and 7-4 Series toggle rifles made by the Russian company Izhmash, and both mechanisms require only around a 2.5 kilogram-force to cycle, and can be cycled in under 1 second. However, with the Fortner straight pull action, the shooter closes the bolt using their thumb, allowing the index finger to get on the trigger blade faster. Anschütz Fortner rifles come with a two-stage trigger adjustable from 90 to 650 g (3.2 oz to 1 lb 6.9 oz).

Other biathlon rifles formerly produced by Anschütz include the Anschütz 1427B Biathlon built on a Match 54 14XX action, the Anschütz 1827 (not to be confused with the 1827 Fortner) built on a Match 54 18XX action and the Anschütz 64R Biathlon built on a Match 64 action.

Izhmash

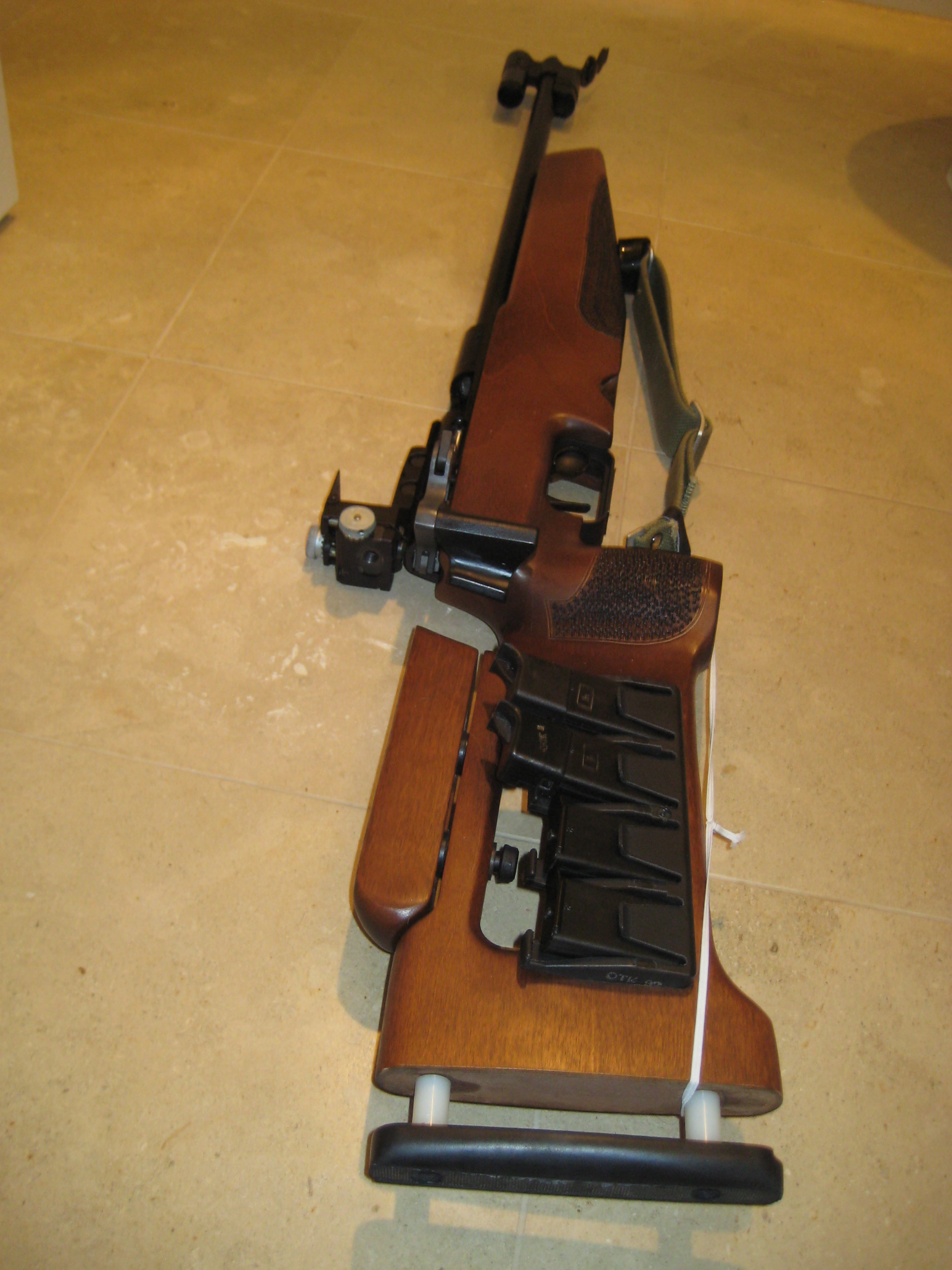
An Izhmash smallbore biathlon rifle.

In 1970, Izhmash started producing the lightweight traditional bolt action Bi-4 rifle in 5.6×15 mmR (.22 LR), which was produced until 1978. For a while, only traditional bolt-action mechanisms were permitted, but this restriction was removed towards the end of the 1970s. In 1976, the Finns presented the first rimfire rifle with a toggle action called Finnbiathlon, allowing for faster reloading. Izhmash soon followed and presented their version of a rimfire toggle action later in 1976, a mechanism which is still used today on Izhmash sport, hunting and tactical rifles. In 1977, when international biathlon standardized the .22 LR caliber, Izhmash released Bi-6 bolt action rimfire rifle. When some of the restrictions on action types were lifted somewhere around 1980, Izhmash took the lead by introducing the Izhmash Bi-7 side-toggle rifle in 1979. The Bi-7 had a weight of 4.0 kg, had a 60 cm long barrel, 111 cm overall length and a sight radius between 81 and 83 cm. The trigger pull weight was adjustable between 200 and 1000 grams. Soviet athletes went to the Biathlon event at the 1980 Winter Olympics in Lake Placid using Bi 7-2 straight pull rifles, and won most medals. The Bi 7-2 rifle set itself apart from the previous Bi 7 toggle series with the introduction of a new barrel locking system which allowed for an increased rate of fire. Across the 1980s, the design proved very successful with Soviet athletes taking the relay gold medals in three successive Olympics.

The Bi 7-2 became the basis for the development of the next rifles in Izhmash Biathlon series, Bi 7-3 and 7–4, which was used in the 1990s by both Russian and foreign competitors, including Germans. The Soviet teams used Izhmash rifles exclusively until the early 1990s, when the difficult Russian economy had a profound effect on development and production at Izhmash. Some Russian athletes began using Austrian Anschütz rifles, and Izhmash also produced their Bi 7-4A rifles using Anschütz barrels. Updated Bi 7-4 rifles were still used at the 2014 Winter Olympics in Sochi. Izhmash's production facilities have since been vastly modernized and improved, and today have inhouse production again of complete rifles. The mechanism is meant to be a simple, reliable and precise construction, and can be dry fired without risk of firing pin damage as long as magazine is not inserted. Bi 7-4 serial production rifles have been steadily refined across the years, with major upgrades in parts like the barrel, stock and sights. Some special versions have also been made. Models now come with two stage triggers adjustable from 300 to 2000 grams. Some examples of top international biathletes currently competing with Izhmash rifles are Evgeniy Garanichev, Yana Romanova, Ekaterina Glazyrina, Olga Vilukhina and Olga Podchufarova. After interest from the Norwegian Biathlon Association, the Bi 7-3 Cadet rifle has been developed to suit the needs of beginner biathletes. The stock is designed for athletes of the age 9 to 15 years, with an adjustable cheek rest and length of pull.

The 7–4 series is a pure competition rifle featuring a more complicated and fully adjustable trigger which can be dry fired, while today's 7–2 series comes with a non adjustable trigger and some design simplifications compared to the 7-4 (some early 7-2 models had a two-stage fully adjustable trigger). The 7–3 series is an in-between model which combines some features from the 7-2 and 7–4. Parts such as different triggers and toggle assemblies are not necessarily interchangeable across models. All modern Izhmash biathlon rifles feature an external safety.

Suhl / Krico

A unique design is the Suhl 626 and 626-1 lever action developed in East Germany of which there only was around a couple of hundred produced, and the similar Krico 360SII later produced in the reunited Germany of which there only was around fifty made. The action is unique in that it is cycled by the rotating the pistol grip approximately 15 degrees. The rifle had a 54 cm barrel length, weighed about 4.2 kg and had a trigger pull around 500 grams. The stock was made of walnut, and was available in a black epoxy finish. The rifle was reportedly discontinued because the biathlon teams considered the price to be too high. One of the last times the rifle was used at an Olympic level was at the 2006 Winter Olympics by Sven Fischer where he took gold in the Men's sprint|Men's 7.5 km Sprint

Another model produced by Krico was the 360S "straight pull" (sometimes referred to as S1 or SI), which was mechanically equivalent to the Suhl 628 model. The Suhl 628 model has the same action type like the Izhmas small bore biathlon rifles.

Lakefield

Lakefield 90B Biathlon was manufactured from 1991 to 1995 in Ontario, Canada by Lake Field Arms Ltd., which was acquired by Savage Arms, Inc. during late 1994. The rifle had an overall length of 101 cm (40 in), a barrel length of 53 cm (21 in), weighed 3.75 kg (8.3 lb), and was also available in a left handed version. The rifle had a one piece hardwood stock with a UIT rail and came with a handstop, and came with peep sights having 1/4 moa (0.073 mrad) click adjustments. The action had a thumb operated safety.

ORSIS

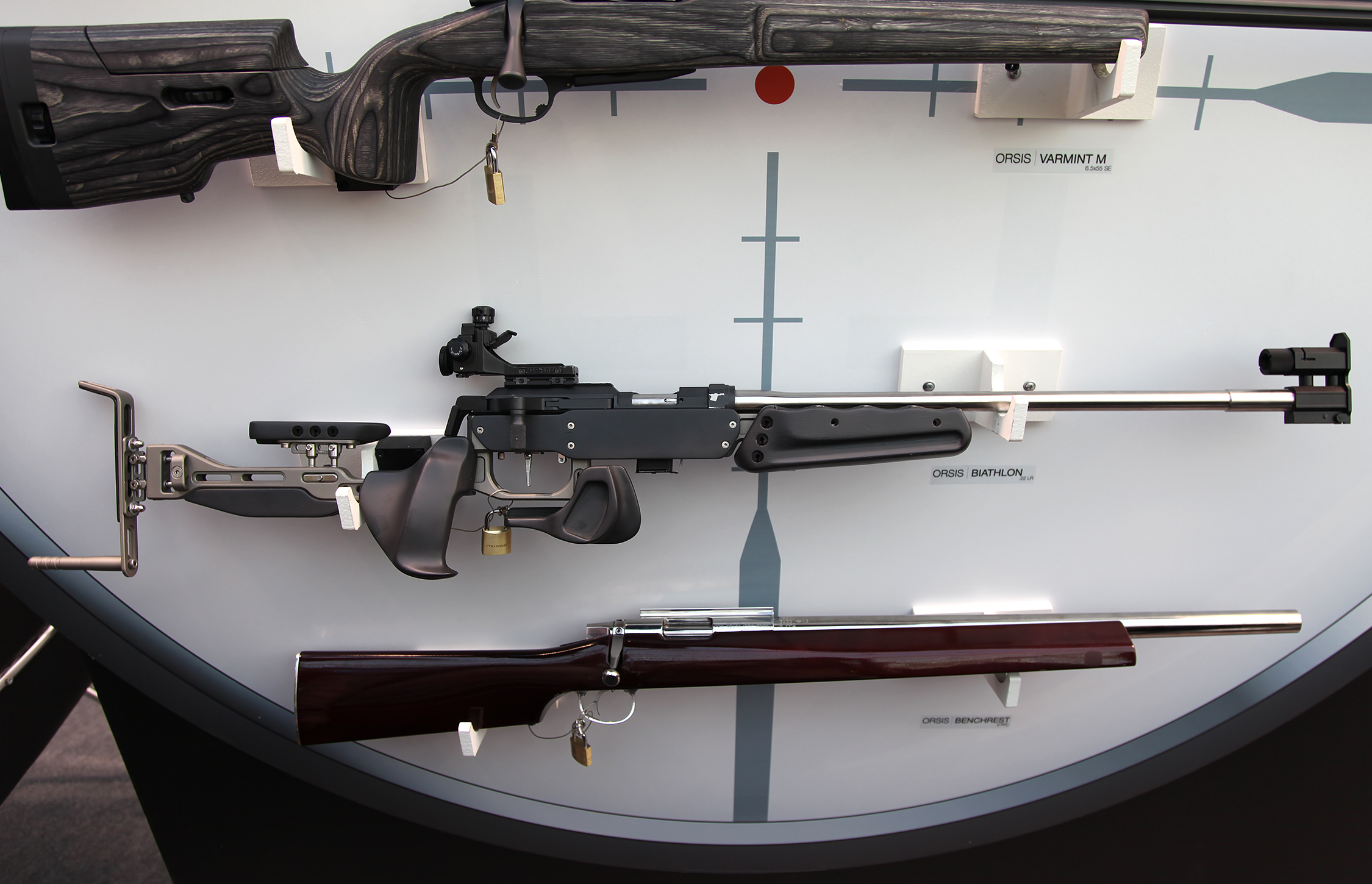
ORSIS Biathlon .22 LR (middle) presented at the 2013 Arms & Hunting exhibition in Moscow.

The ORSIS Biathlon .22 LR rifle was designed to be as close to the IBU weight limit of 3.5 kg as possible, and to have an adjustable stock design made of aluminum alloy and laminate wood to able to suit the body of any athlete. Prototypes were made between 2011 and 2013, and was shown to biathlon coaches at an exhibition in December 2013.

Other

There are also biathlon air rifles (4.5 mm) used for summer biathlon, target sprint and training at 10 meters.

- (United Kingdom) Air Arms MPR Biathlon
- (Germany) Anschütz 2027 Summer Biathlon
- (Russia) Baikal MP 571K PCP
- (Germany) Feinwerkbau P75 Biathlon
- (Sweden) FX Airguns Biathlon MkII
- (Germany) Haenel Biathlon B96
- (Russia) Izhmash Bi 7-5
- (Austria) Steyr LGB 1 Biathlon
- (Germany) Walther LG400 Target Sprint
- (Ukraine) Zbroia Biathlon 550/200
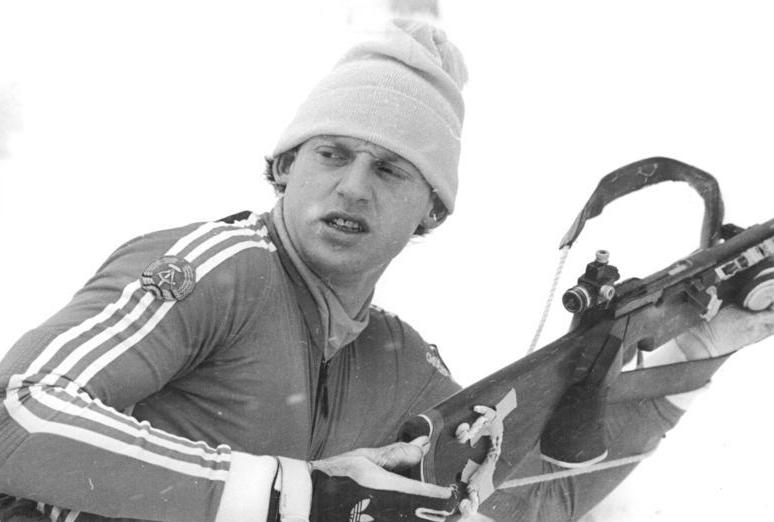
East German biathlete Holger Wick with his Suhl rifle.

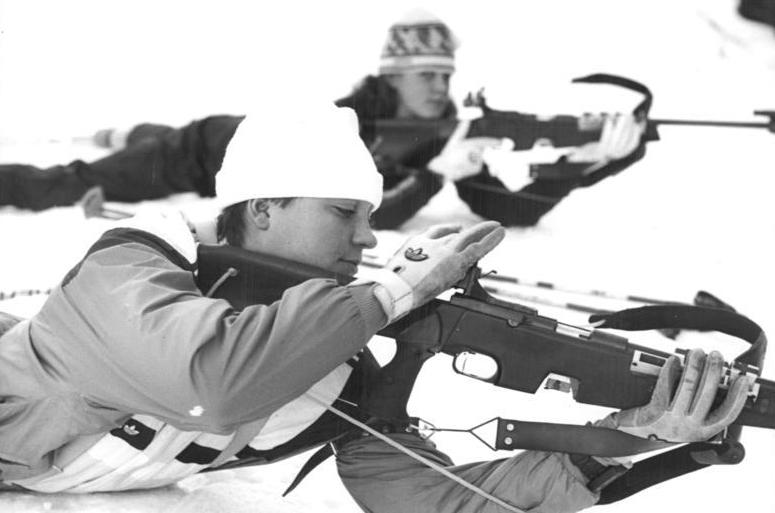
East German biathletes Kerstin Mohring (front) and Antje Harvey (back) with their Suhl rifles.

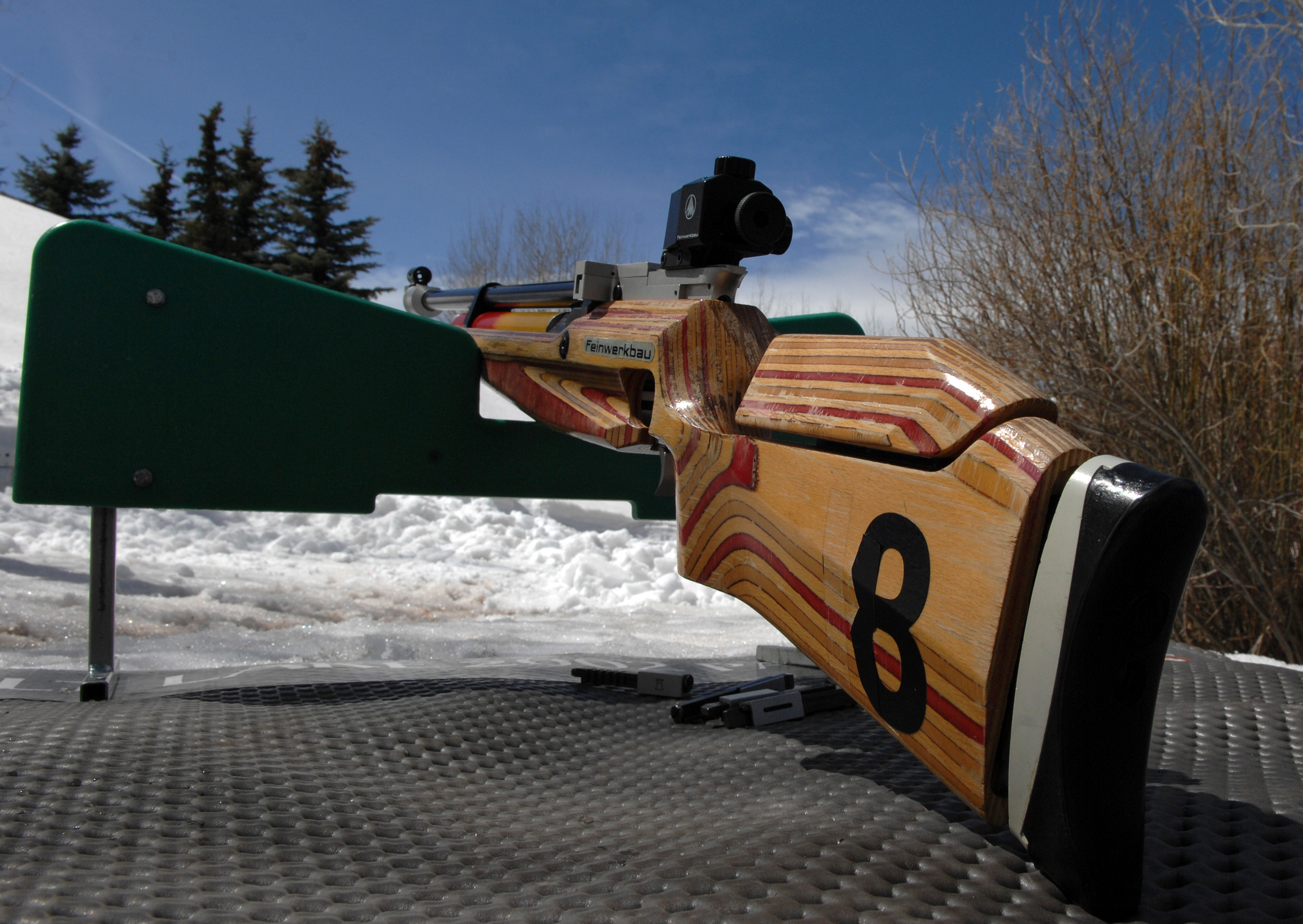
A Feinwerkbau biathlon air rifle with laminated woodstock.

==== List of smallbore rifles ====
Some well known smallbore (.22 LR/5.6×15 mmR) biathlon rifles

Name	Years produced	Country of origin
Anschütz 1403 Biathlon	1964-current	West Germany
Anschütz 1427B	1975-?	West Germany
Anschütz 1827B	1982-	West Germany
Anschütz 64R Biathlon	1964-current	West Germany
Izhmash Bi-4	1970-1978	Soviet Union
Sako P72	1972-?	Finland
Finnbiathlon	1976-1984	Finland
Izhmash Bi-6	1977-?	Soviet Union
Sako P78/M78	1978-1986?	Finland
Izhmash Bi-7	1978-1980	Soviet Union
Suhl 626/629	1980s-?	East Germany
Izhmash 7-2	1980-1983 (small scale); 1983-1991 (serially)	Soviet Union
CBC Linha Impala Model 422 Biathlon	1983-1993	Brazil
Anschütz 1827 Fortner	1984-current	West Germany, and later in Germany
Voere 1007 Biathlon	1984-1986	Austria
Izhmash CM-2 (Standard or Cadet)	?	Soviet Union
Izhmash 7-2-KO	1990s?-current	Russia
Izhmash 7-3	1990s?-current	Russia
Anschütz 1403B	1991-?	Germany
Lakefield 90B Biathlon	1991-1995	Canada
Izhmash 7-4	1991-current	Russia
Krico 360s	1991-?	Germany
Krico 360S2	1991-1996	Germany
Savage 900b Biathlon	1996-2002	United States
Marlin 2000/2000L Biathlon	2000-2001	United States
Izhmash 7-3 Cadet	2000s?-current	Russia
Savage MKII FVT (popular for biathlon conversion)	2011-current	United States
ORSIS Biathlon	2011-2013 (only prototypes)	Russia
Izhmash Bi 7-7	Expected 2019	Russia

=== Fullbore ===
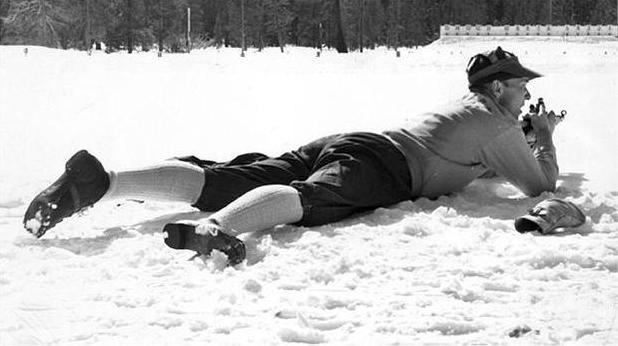
Klas Lestander from Sweden became the world's first Olympic champion in Biathlon at the 1960 Olympics. Biathletes at that time used high-power centerfire rifles, normally in caliber 7.62 mm.

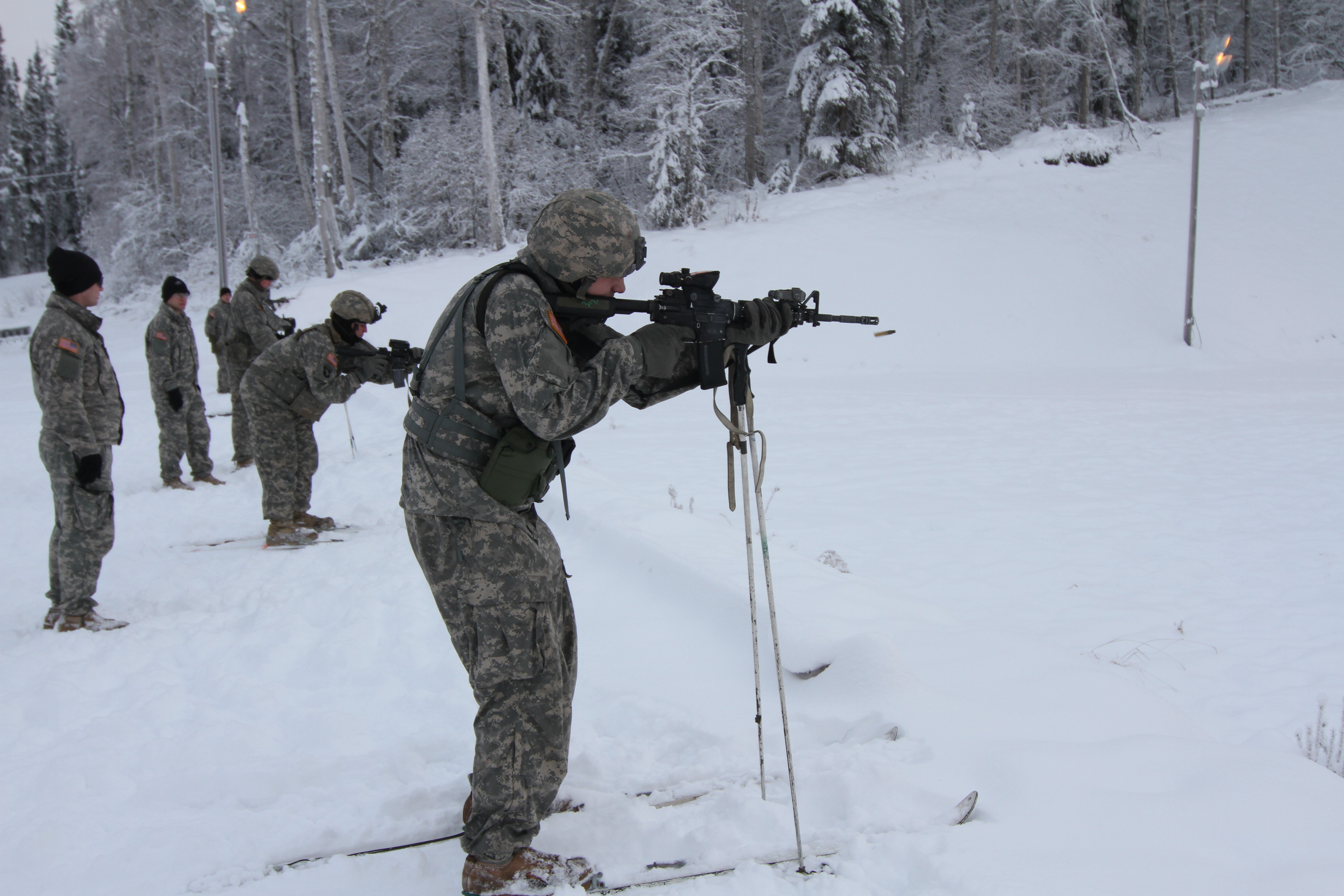
Soldiers in the U.S. Army 5th Infantry Regiment during a fullbore biathlon competition in Alaska December 2014.

The predecessor of biathlon, military patrol, was fired with fullbore rifles, and was part of the 1924 Olympics, as well as a demonstration event in 1928, 1936 and 1948.

From the start of the modern biathlon in 1958 until 1965, international competitions were held exclusively using high power centerfire cartridges (such as the .30-06 and 7.62 NATO). Fullbore biathlon was part of the Winter Olympic Games in 1960, 1964, 1968, 1972 and 1976. Fullbore World Championships were held from Saalfelden 1958 to Vingrom 1977, with Lake Placid 1973 being the first time the World Championships took place outside Europe. Caliber discussions was a recurring subject, and there was a long trend of different nations moving towards various 6.5 mm or smaller calibers. In 1976 it was decided by the International Modern Pentathlon Union (UIPM) that all international championships starting from 1 January 1978 would be conducted using the .22 Long Rifle (LR) smallbore caliber. The last major championship using fullbore rifles was the 1977 World Championship in Vingrom, Norway. From 1978, .22 LR smallbore was the official caliber in international biathlon. High power centerfire cartridges are, however, still used today in Nordic field biathlon and moose biathlon competitions.

In 1960, the sole event was the men's 20 km individual, with shooting at the four distances of 100, 150, 200 and 250 meters. From 1963, all biathletes switched to cartridges based on the 6.5 mm projectile. As a result, the Soviet Union developed the Bi-6.5 rifle and the new cartridge .220 Russian (5.6×39mm) (which would later lead to development of the famous 5.45×39mm military cartridge). The newly developed 5.6×39mm cartridge was also used in 100 meter running deer competitions in specially developed sport rifles such as the MBO-1M and MBO-2 (МБО-2) straight pull rifles, as well as the MBO-3 pump rifle.

In 1966, with the addition of the relay event, the target distance was reduced to 150 m. The shooting range was reduced to 50 m in 1978 with the standardization of the rimfire cartridge, and the self-indicating targets used today made their debut at the 1980 Winter Olympics.

While international biathlon switched to smallbore, Nordic field biathlon and moose biathlon continued to use fullbore rifles. Currently only iron sights are permitted in field biathlon, and the firearm must be on an approved list. In moose biathlon however, any scope and fullbore rifle legal for moose hunting are permitted, and the ammunition also has to satisfy the legal kinetic energy requirement for hunting moose.

American fullbore rifles

The Winchester Model 70 in caliber .30-06, .308 Win and .243 Win has been used by U.S. athletes.

Austrian fullbore rifles

Austrian biathletes competed with fullbore rifles at the 1964, 1968 and 1976 Olympics.

British fullbore rifles

British biathletes competed with fullbore rifles at the 1960, 1964, 1968, 1972 and 1976 Olympics.

Bulgarian fullbore rifles

Bulgarian biathletes competed with fullbore rifles at the 1976 Olympics.

Canadian fullbore rifles

Canadian biathletes competed with fullbore rifles at the 1968 Olympics.

During the 1950s, the Ross straight-pull rifle became well known at the biathlon and running deer competition circuits in Europe. Visiting shooters at the 1958 World Championships in Moscow had the opportunity to borrow Ross rifles converted to the 7.62x54R Soviet cartridge. Ross rifles with slings, target sights and 3-position stocks were used with success by Soviet biathletes.

Czechoslovak fullbore rifles

Czechoslovak biathletes competed with fullbore rifles at the 1968, 1972 and 1976 Olympics.

Finnish fullbore rifles

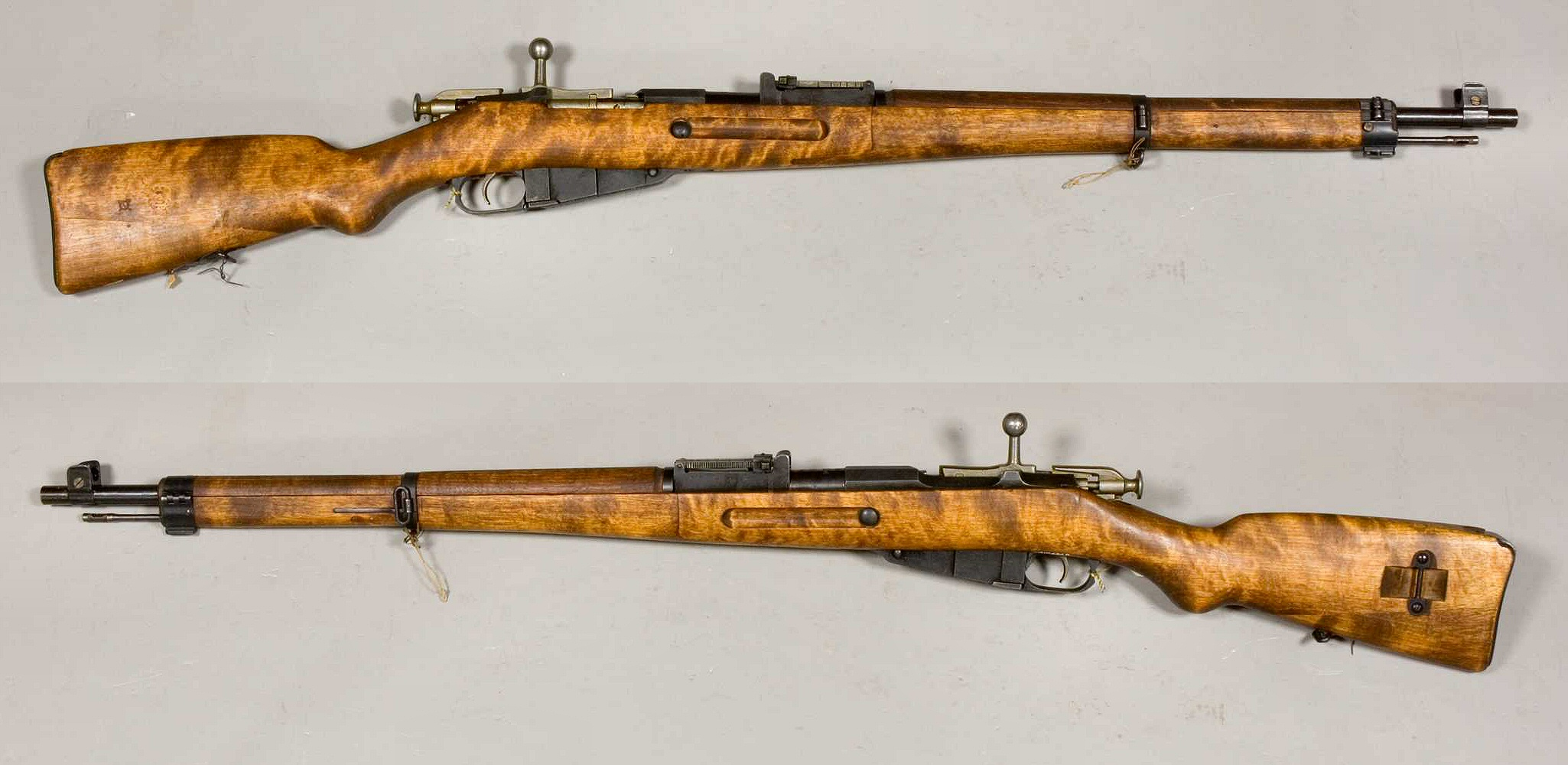
Soviet Mosin Nagant (pictured) were used as a basis for the Finnish M28-57 biathlon rifle

Finnish biathletes competed with fullbore rifles at the 1960, 1964, 1968, 1972 and 1976 Olympics, and at the 1965, 1969, 1974, 1975 and 1977 World Championships. Ampumahiihtokivääri is the Finnish word for biathlon rifle. Fullbore biathlon competitions are still held in Finland to this day in moose biathlon.

French fullbore rifles

French biathletes competed with fullbore rifles at the 1960, 1964, 1968, 1972 and 1976 Olympics. At the 1962 World Championship and 1964 Olympics, French athletes used Swedish rifles with folding stocks.

German fullbore rifles

West and East Germany sent a joint team competing as the United Team of Germany at the 1956, 1960, and 1964 Winter Olympics. Separate teams competed in 1968, 1972, 1976, 1980, 1984 and 1988.

East Germany competed as a separate team at the 1965, 1970, 1971, 1973, 1974, 1975 and 1977 World Championships.

Examples of manufacturers who made German biathlon rifles were Anschütz and Walther. In 1975, before the 1976 Winter Olympics in Innsbruck, Austria, the West German team contacted Anschütz with the aim to develop a more competitive rifle. The .222 Rem centerfire cartridge was selected, and Anschütz fullbore biathlon rifles (1530) were made based on the design of the smallbore Anschütz 54 model.

Hungarian fullbore rifles

Hungarian biathletes competed with fullbore rifles at the 1960 Olympics

Italian fullbore rifles

Italian biathletes competed with fullbore rifles at the 1972 and 1976 Olympics.

Japanese fullbore rifles

Japanese biathletes competed with fullbore rifles at the 1964, 1968, 1972 and 1976 Olympics. At the 1964 Olympics, Japanese athletes used Swedish rifles with folding stocks.

Mongolian fullbore rifles

Mongolian biathletes competed with fullbore rifles at the 1964 and 1968 Olympics

Norwegian fullbore rifles

So called HV-Mauser's were popular in Norway during the early days of modern biathlon competitions, which were captured WW2 German Mauser K98k rifles rechambered to .30-06 Springfield (7.62x63 mm) by Kongsberg våpenfabrikk in the early 1950s. However, the short sight radius of the HV-Mauser made precise aiming difficult, so competitors soon rebuilt and modernized their rifles by adding a longer barrel and diopter sights, usually with globe inserts.

Contrary to other forms of shooting within DFS, biathlon competitions allowed the use of custom built rifles. Most Norwegian custom built rifles were based on either the Mauser M59 or M67 standard rifles otherwise used in DFS, which were modified to suit the preferences of the athlete. There was never any large scale serial production of dedicated fullbore biathlon rifles in Norway, but a common recipe for a custom build was to start with a Mauser mechanism with a 19 mm barrel profile, and add diopter sights such as either Kongsberg Elit, Söderin or Redfield. Most preferred the 6.5×55 mm caliber, but the 7.62 NATO caliber was also used by many.

Special biathlon stock designs mimicking those seen in free rifle at the time also started to become common. A cottage industry emerged, with for example aftermarket stocks based on balsa wood being produced. These were lightweight and ergonomically shaped, and were produced mainly for the M67, but also to some extent for the M59 and Krag-Jørgensen. However, custom stock designs were not permitted in Nordic Bullseye and Field shooting competitions. Some competitors solved this by having two sets of stocks for their rifle; one to be used for Bullseye and Field competitions in the summer, and a biathlon stock for the winter season.

By 1970, most Norwegian athletes preferred the 6.5×55 mm and 7.62 NATO calibers, and top competitors had begun using dedicated shooting slings and carrying harnesses, as well as dedicated ammunition belts for easier carry and access. At the 1975 Norwegian Biathlon Championship, over half of the competitors used custom fullbore biathlon rifles built to their own specifications. Almost all custom rifles were built in the 6.5x55 mm caliber. A considerable amount of shooters also competed with stock rifles, mostly the Kongsberg M/67 F1 sharpshooter rifle, but also the Kongsberg M59 and Kongsberg M59 F1. A few athletes competed with other rifles (both stock and custom), such as the Sako L 579 biathlon. In total more than 5 or 6 different types of calibers were used at the 1975 Norwegian Championship, including .30-06 Springfield, .243 Win and others. Towards the end of the fullbore caliber era, smaller fullbore calibers such as the .223 Remington became more widespread in use. For example, Sako Vixen rifles in .223 Rem were used by some Norwegian competitions, equipped with an ergonomic stock and a modern biathlon carrying harness.

Aftermarket stocks and custom fullbore biathlon rifles continued to be permitted in Nordic field biathlon competitions during a transitional period until 31 December 2010, after which only standard rifles approved for other competitions in DFS has been permitted in field biathlon competitions, which in practice means only SIG Sauer 200 STR.

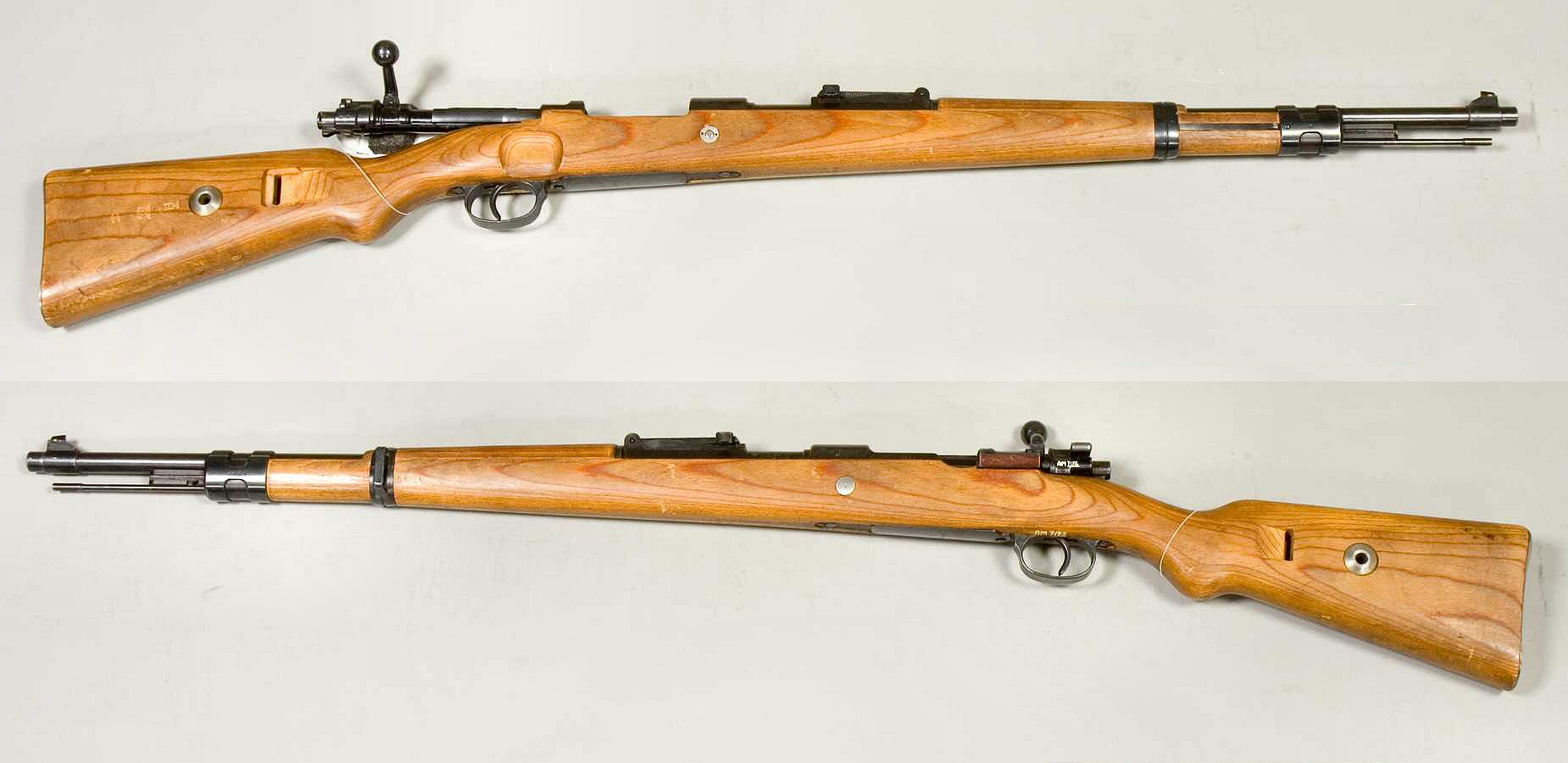
"HV-Mauser's" (captured Karabiner 98k's) were popular in Norway during the early days of modern biathlon competitions.

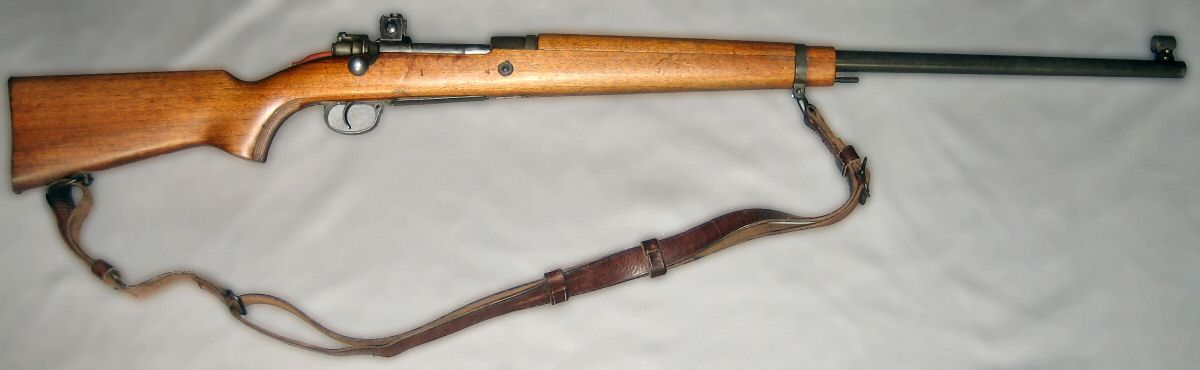
A Norwegian Mauser M59.

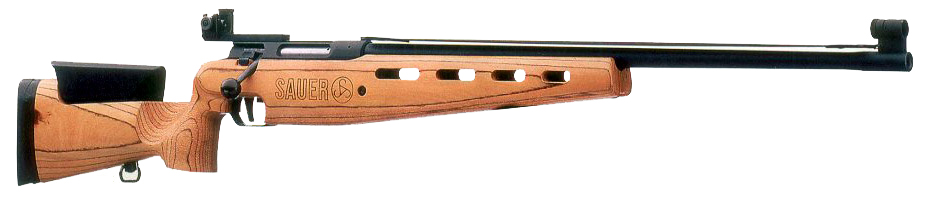
SIG Sauer 200 STR, the current standard rifle in Nordic field biathlon.

Polish fullbore rifles

Polish biathletes competed with fullbore rifles at the 1968, 1972 and 1976 Olympics, and at the 1965, 1966, 1967, 1971 and 1975 World Championships.

Romanian fullbore rifles

Romanian biathletes competed with fullbore rifles at the 1968, 1972 Olympics and 1976 Olympics, and at the 1965 and 1974 World Championships

Soviet fullbore rifles

In 1958, Soviet athletes competed in the first world championship in Austria using the standard Mosin rifle, but already returned in 1959 using the specially designed Bi-59 biathlon rifle built by Shestryakov (А. С. Шестериков) at Izhmash by modyfing the standard Mosin rifle with a new barrel, stock and diopter sight. At the 1960 Winter Olympics 20 km individual, Soviet biathlete Alexander Privalov won the bronze medal using the Bi-59 rifle. In 1961 the Soviet team received a new biathlon rifle called Bi-7,62, where 7.62 refers to the caliber used. Some of the improvements were added covers protecting the muzzle and diopter sight from snow and debris. The Bi-59 and Bi-7,62 would both continue to be used by Soviet athletes in competitions until the end of the 1970s. Bi-6,5 and BiL-6,5 in rifles (the latter based on a hunting carbine) were later Soviet fullbore biathlon developments in 6.5 mm caliber aimed at reducing recoil and weight. The Bi-5 rifle was introduced in 1971,, and was used by Soviet athletes to take gold medals in 1972 and 1976. The Bi-5 was produced serially between 1973 and 1975, but was only used for competitions inside the Soviet Union. The rifle had its world debut at the 1976 Winter Olympics in Innsbruck, Austria, with the impressive results of Nikolay Kruglov taking the individual gold medal as well as the Soviet team winning the relay.

Swedish fullbore rifles

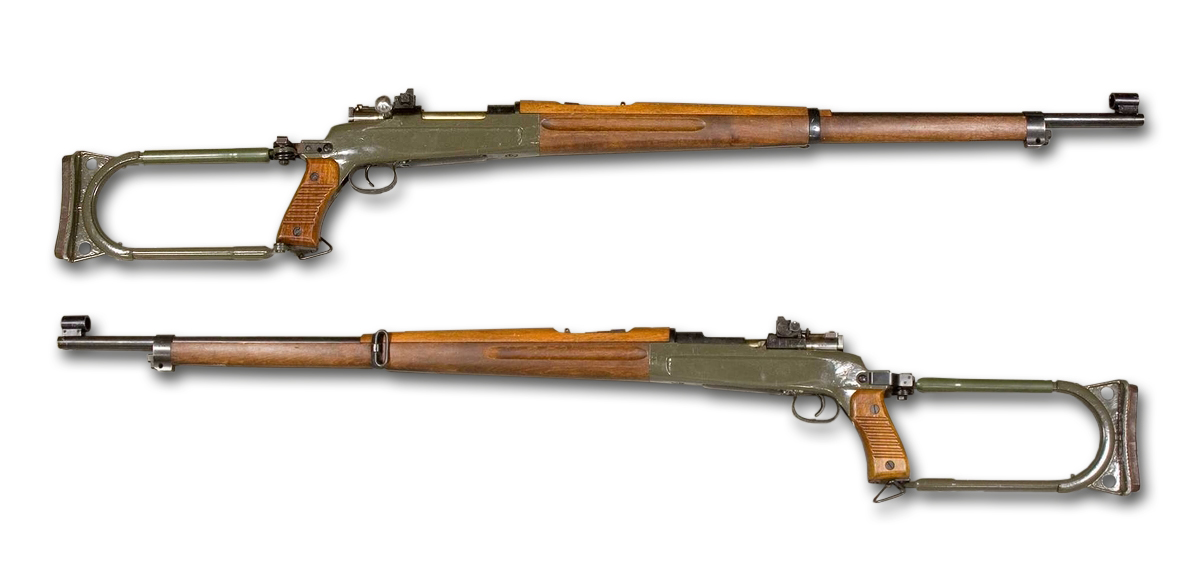
Mauser m/1896 biathlon rifle chambered in 6.5×55mm

Various models of the Swedish Carl Gustav biathlon rifles were popular. In the 1960 Winter Olympics at Squaw Valley, Klas Lestander from Sweden won the first olympic biathlon event using the Carl Gustaf CG-62 rifle. The rifle was available in both 7.62 NATO and 6.5×55mm, and was dubbed the "rifle with the folding butt" due to its m/45 style folding stock. In the 1962 World Championships, another folding stock rifle called m/Salla was used instead by both the Swedish and French teams. In the Biathlon event at the 1964 Winter Olympics in Innsbruck, Austria, the Swedish folding stock rifle would again be used by both the Swedish, French and Japanese teams. The main advantage of having a folder was easier carry, but the design soon disappeared from the competition circuit due to the development of new carrying harnesses. Biathlon in Sweden was long governed by the Swedish Multisport Association (Svenska Mångkampsförbundet, formerly Sveriges militära idrottsförbund), as opposed to the FSR. Therefore, there were some Swedish biathlon rifles which were not approved for other types of competitions within the FSR, like for example the Carl Gustaf CG-67 (Skidskyttegevär CG-67).

Swiss fullbore rifles

Swiss biathletes competed with fullbore rifles at the 1976 Olympics. The WF Bern Precision Carbine (Präzisionskarabiner) Model 74B was built in 1974 according to international biathlon competition rules, and chambered for the 7.5×55mm cartridge. It is based on a K31 action, with the main differences being diopter sights, a heavy barrel, anatomic stock with a rubber buttpad and an adjustable two stage trigger.

Other special K31 variants are the Präzisionskarabiner Modell 65 and 70B, which differed from more common civilian K31 versions having more modifications as permitted by UIPMB (biathlon) and UIT (free rifle) competition rules. This compared to more common civilian K31 versions used in Swiss shooting matches, which are similar to those issued by the military except for aftermarket diopter sights.

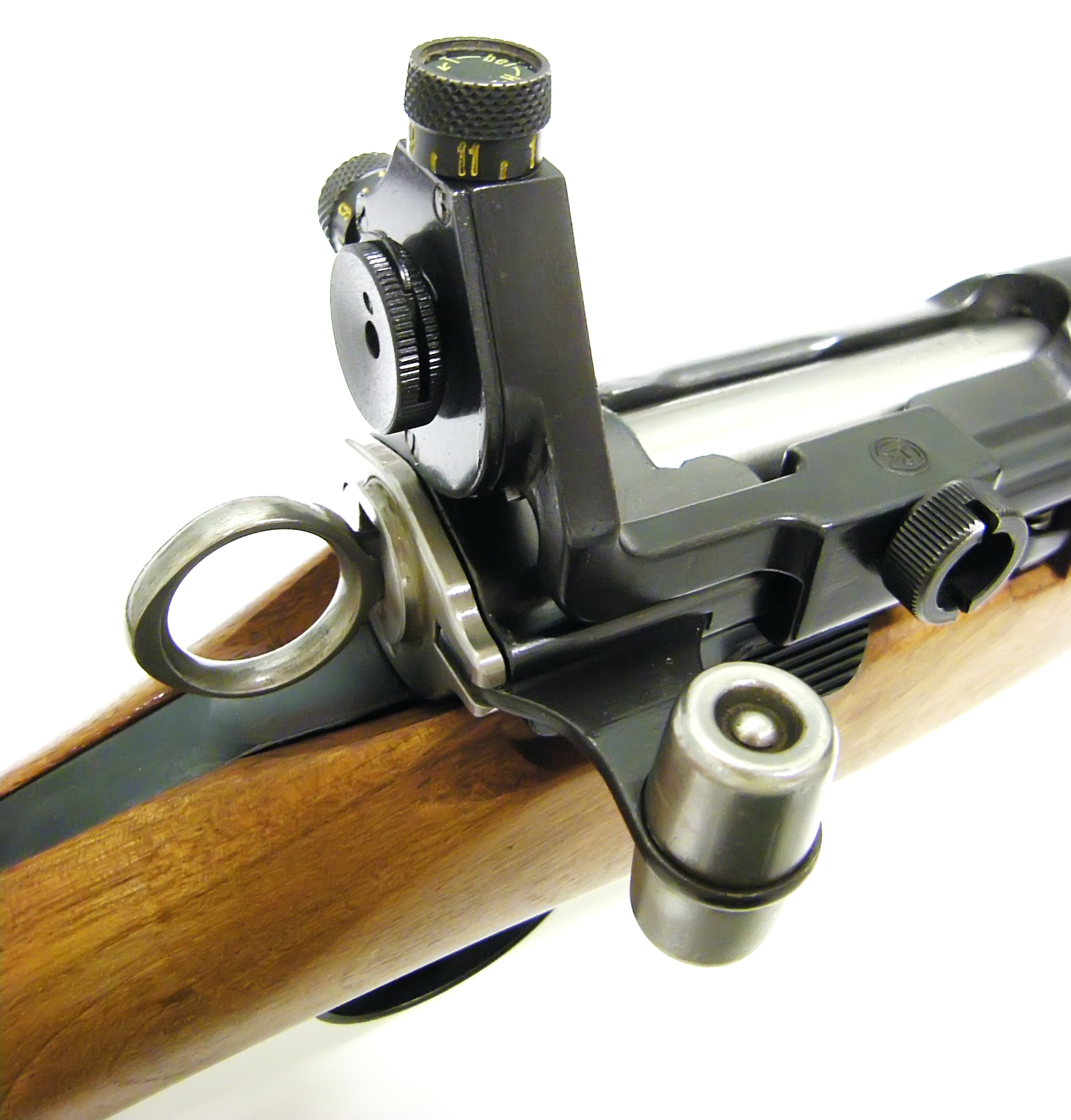
K31 with civilian diopter rear sight.

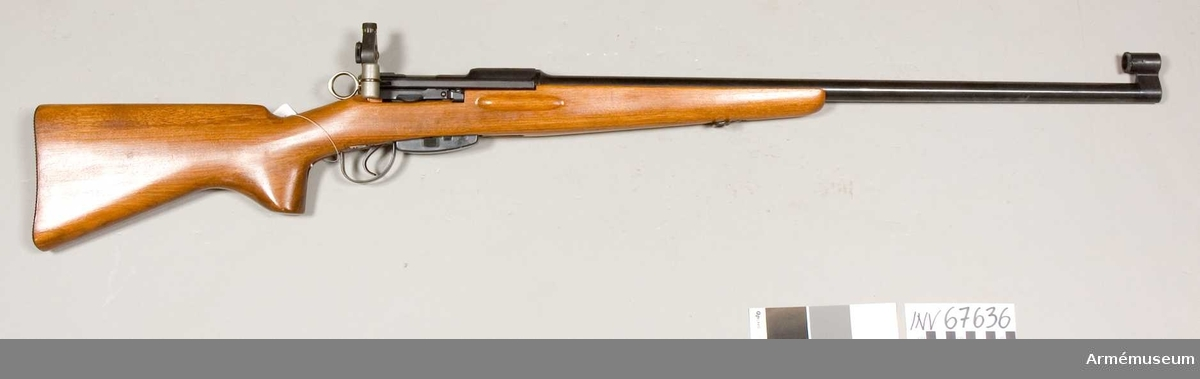
Präzisionskarabiner Modell 65

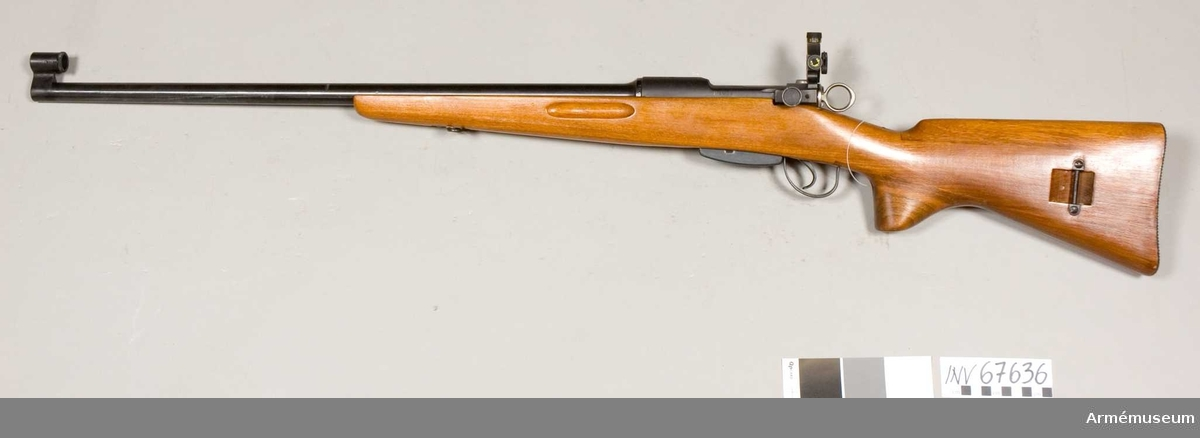
Präzisionskarabiner Modell 65

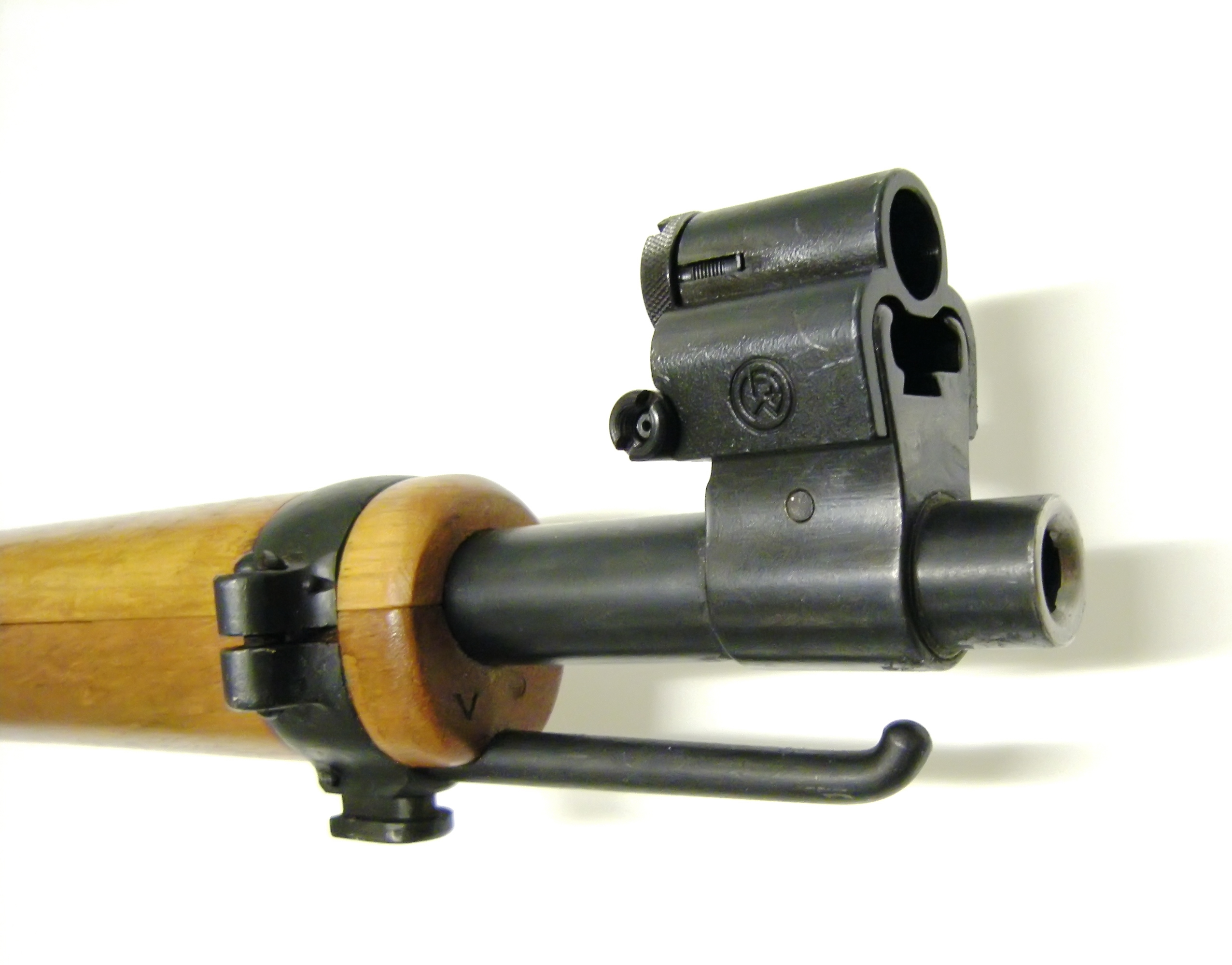
K31 with civilian globe front sight.

Taiwanese fullbore rifles

Taiwanese (Republic of China) biathletes competed with fullbore rifles at the 1976 Olympics.

==== List of fullbore rifles ====
Fullbore biathlon rifles by country

Name	Cartridge(s)	Years produced	Country of origin	Used by
Krag-Jørgensen	6.5×55mm	1893–1950s	Norway	Formerly used by Norwegian biathletes in biathlon and field biathlon, but less popular than Mauser's.
Mauser m/96	6.5×55mm	1895–1948	Sweden	Formerly used by Swedish biathletes
Mosin-Nagant Vostok	7.62×54mmR	1891–1965	Soviet Union	Standard rifle for Soviet biathletes in the 1960s and 70's
Ross rifle	.303 Brit	1950s	Canada	Used by Canadian biathletes in the 1950s.
Izhmash Biathlon-59	7.62×54mmR	1959	Soviet Union	Standard rifle for Soviet biathletes in the 1960s and 70's. (See ru:wiki).
Mauser M59	6.5×55mm, 7.62 NATO	1959–1967	Norway	Formerly used by Norwegian biathletes (both stock and custom)
Carl Gustaf CG-62	6.5×55mm	1962	Sweden	Folding stock rifle formerly used by Swedish biathletes.
Carl Gustaf CG-63 (63S, 63E)	6.5×55mm	1963	Sweden	Formerly used by Swedish biathletes. Most Swedish shooters used CG- 63 rifles until arrival of the Scandinavian Target Rifle in 1990.
Mannlicher–Schönauer Biathlon Gewehr N.O.	.308 Win, 6.5×54mm	1952-1972	Austria	Custom made biathlon rifles were made with straight buttstocks in two variants. A prototype folding stock was also made. Around 18 biathlon rifles were made in 1955 for the German Bundeswehr team, as well as around 20 for the Austrian Bundesheer team.
Mauser M67	6.5×55mm, 7.62 NATO	1967–1990s	Norway	Formerly used by Norwegian biathletes in biathlon and field biathlon (both stock and custom)
Carl Gustaf CG-67 (Skidskyttegevär CG-67)	6.5×55mm	1967	Sweden	Formerly used by Swedish biathletes Were not approved for field biathlon competitions in FSR.
Automatgevär m/42	6.5×55mm	1942–1960s	Sweden	Formerly used by Swedish biathletes
Präzisionskarabiner 70B	7.5×55mm Swiss	1970-?	Switzerland	K31 based Präzisionskarabiner 70 B variant was used by Swiss athletes in fullbore biathlon competitions.
Carl Gustaf CG-73	6.5×55mm	1973	Sweden	Formerly used by Swedish biathletes
Carl Gustaf CG-74	6.5×55mm	1974	Sweden	Formerly used by Swedish biathletes
Präzisionskarabiner 74B	7.5×55mm Swiss	1974-?	Switzerland	K31 based Präzisionskarabiner 74 B variant was used by Swiss athletes in fullbore biathlon competitions.
Anschütz 1530	.222 Rem	1976-1977	West Germany	Used by West-German biathletes in 1976.
Carl Gustaf CG-80	6.5×55mm	1980	Sweden	Formerly used by Swedish biathletes
Sako Forester L579	6×52mm	1957–?	Finland	Formerly used by Finnish biathletes
Mosin Nagant M28-57	7.62×54mmR	1957-?	Finland	Formerly used by Finnish biathletes
Winchester Model 70	6×52mm, 7.62 NATO	1936–1963	USA	Formerly used by American biathletes
Izhmash Bi-7,62	7.62×54mmR	1961–1970	Soviet Union	Standard rifle for Soviet biathletes in the 1960s and 70's. Commercially produced, 1700 manufactured.(ru:wiki)
Izhmash Bi-6,5	6.5×54mmR	1964-1970	Soviet Union	Later fullbore biathlon developments aimed at reducing recoil and weight, following rule changes in 1963. Commercial variants made for export were marked as "Vostok".
Sako Vixen L461	.223 Rem	1970s	Finland	Formerly used by Finnish and Norwegian biathletes.
Izhmash Bi-5	5.6×39mm	1973–1975	Soviet Union	Later fullbore biathlon developments aimed at reducing recoil and weight
Lakelander	.308 Win		Finland	A moose biathlon variant of the Lakelander was produced for moose biathlon competitions
FSR-89	6.5×55mm	1989	Sweden	Formerly used by Swedish biathletes, although to a small degree due to the foreseen arrival of the Scandinavian Target Rifle in 1990. Ultrashort cocking piece.
SIG Sauer 200 STR	6.5×55mm	1990–current	Germany	Current standard rifle in field biathlon and Nordic shooting with cross-country running.
SIG Sauer 205 Biathlon	7.62 NATO	1994–2007	Germany	Model developed for moose biathlon competitions in Finland.
Tikka T3 Sporter	7.62 NATO	2011-current	Finland	Used in moose biathlon competitions in Finland.

== See also ==
- Biathlon at the Winter Olympics
- Lynx 94, a modern biathlon style fullbore rifle
- List of straight pull rifles
