= IBU Summer Biathlon =

Summer variant of biathlon that combined roller skiing and shooting

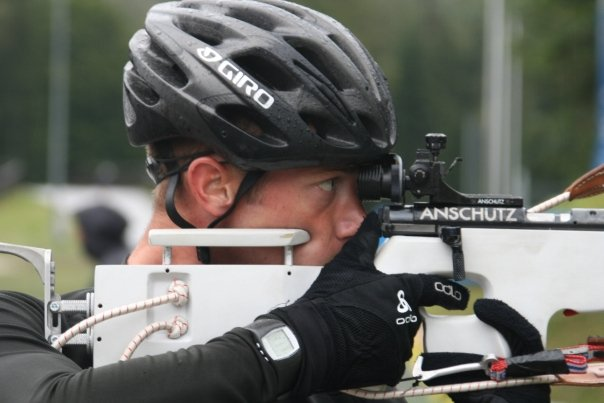
British biathlete Ben Woolley firing with his Anschütz Fortner biathlon rifle during a summer biathlon training in 2008 or 2009.

The IBU Summer Biathlon is a sporting event organized by the International Biathlon Union (IBU) which combines trail running or roller skiing and rifle shooting, or sometimes trail running and rifle shooting. It is modeled after the IBU (winter) biathlon, which is an Olympic sport that combines rifle shooting with cross-country skiing. The Summer Biathlon World Championships have been held annually since 1990. Trail running was part of the world championships until 2009.

== See also ==
- IBU Biathlon
- ISSF Target Sprint
- Biathlon orienteering
- Nordic shooting with cross-country running, a Nordic biathlon variant using fullbore rifles
- Moose biathlon, another Nordic biathlon variant using fullbore rifles
