= Anschütz 1827 Fortner =

Type of biathlon rifle

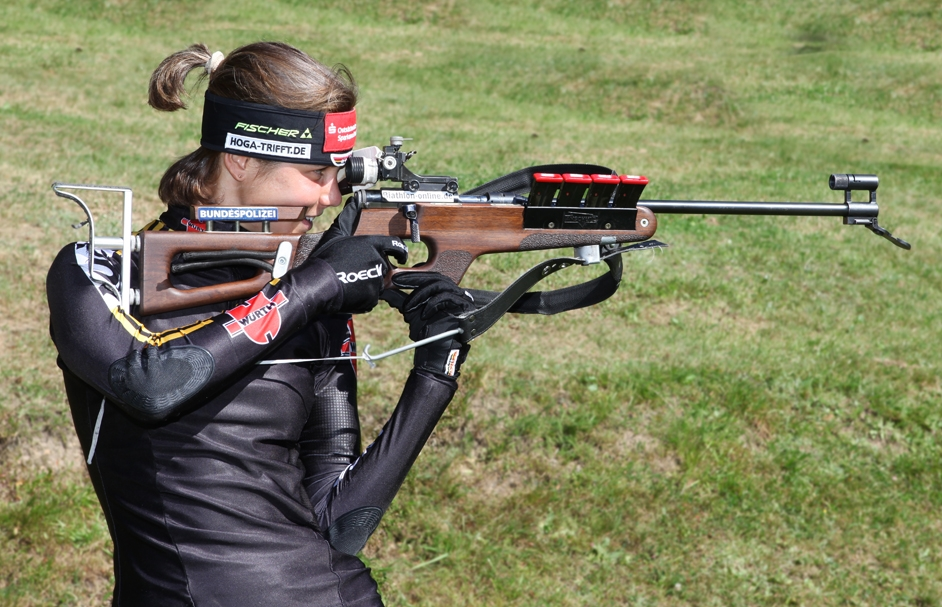
- German Tina Bachmann with an Anschütz Fortner biathlon rifle in .22 Long Rifle.
- Type: Repeating rifle
- Place of origin: Germany

Production history
- Designer: Peter Fortner Jr.
- Designed: 1984
- Variants: Comfort

Specifications
- Mass: 3.7-4.0 kg
- Length: 1040 mm
- Barrel length: 550 mm
- Cartridge: .22 LR (5.6×15mmR)
- Action: Roller locked straight-pull
- Muzzle velocity: 335 to 425 m/s
- Sights: 0.06 mrad target aperture sight

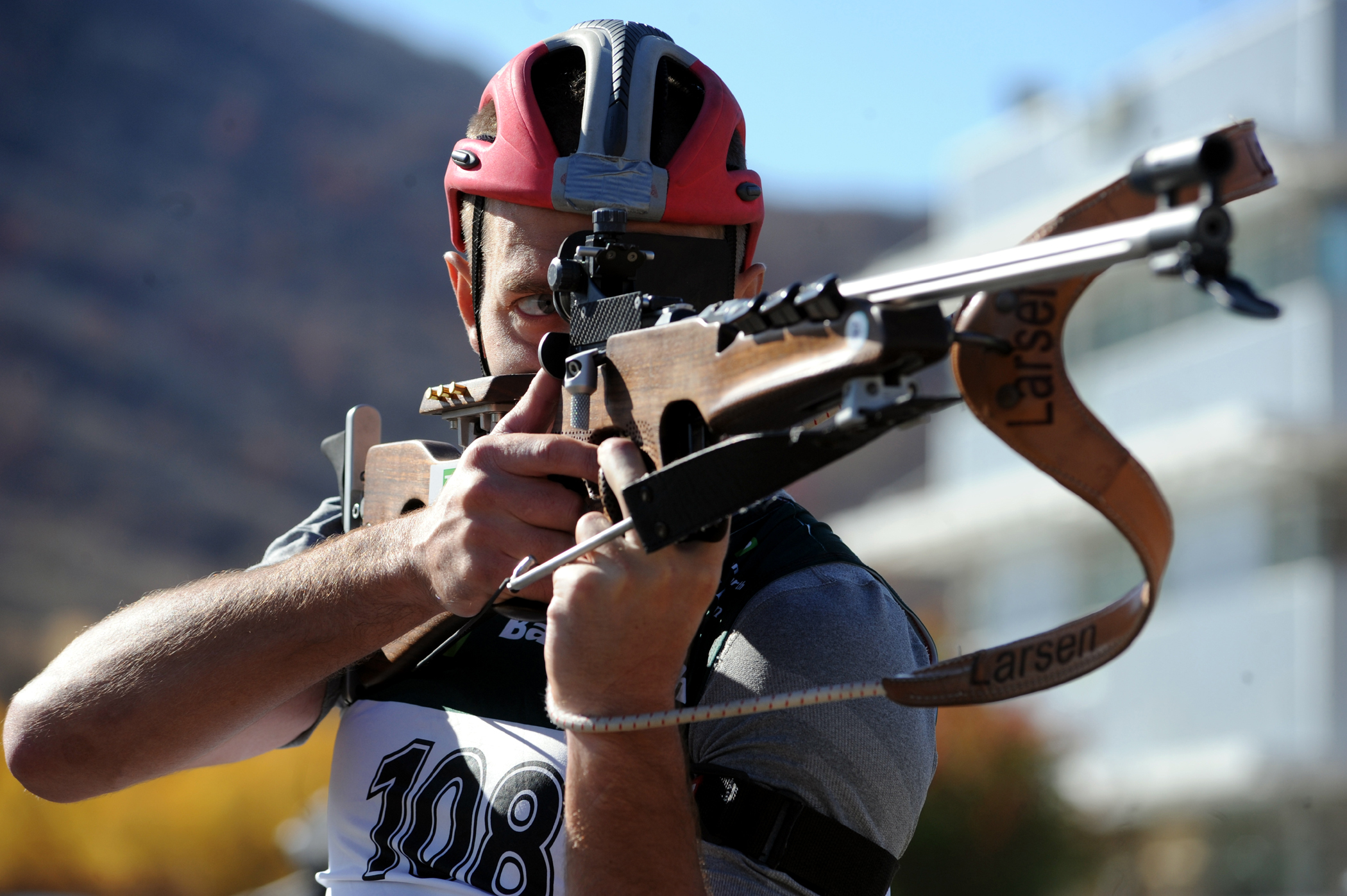
Three-time Olympian Jeremy Teela practices shooting with his Anschütz Fortner rifle at a summer biathlon event in Utah, USA

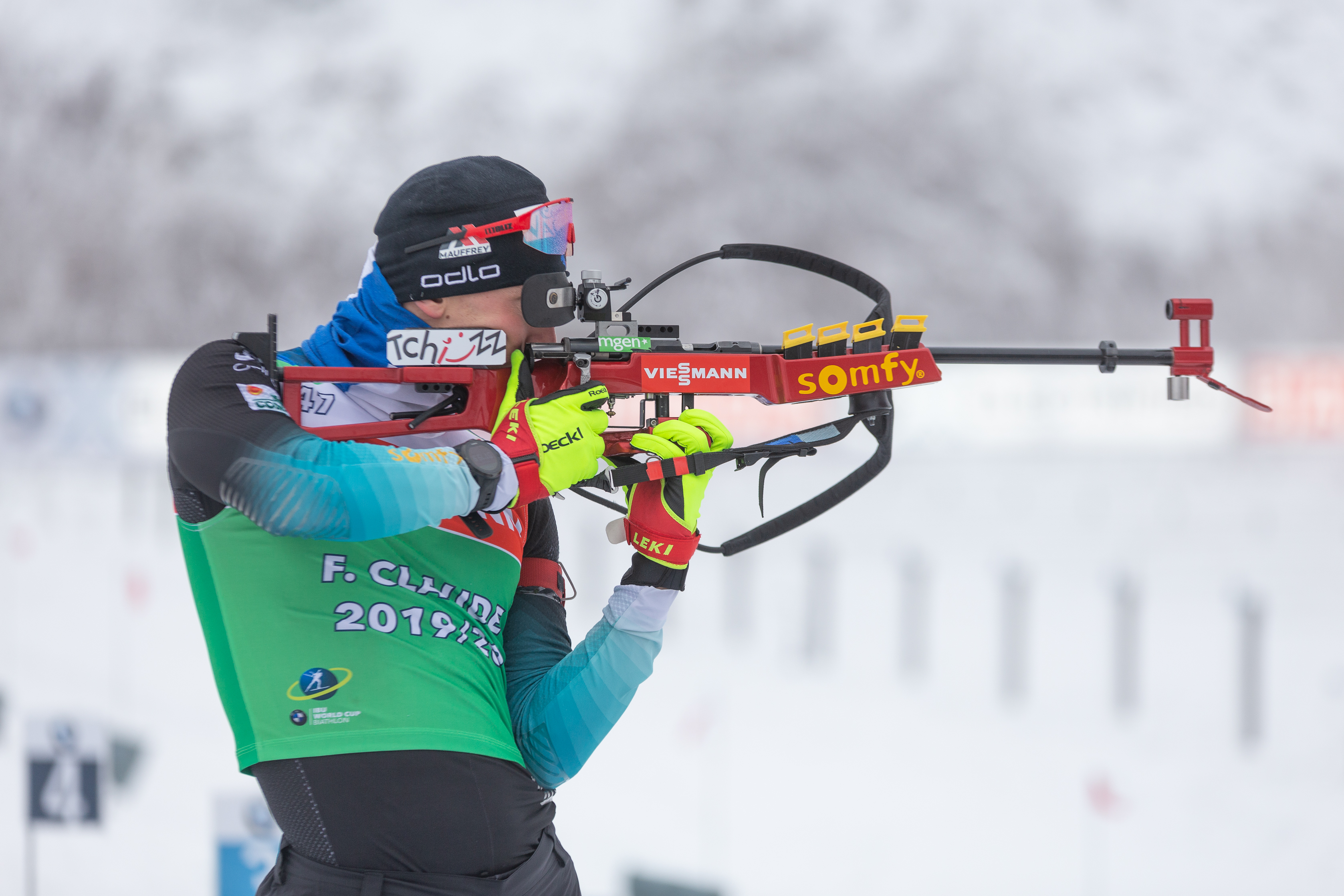
Anschütz Fortner rifle used by Fabien Claude at the 2020 Oberhof Biathlon World Cup

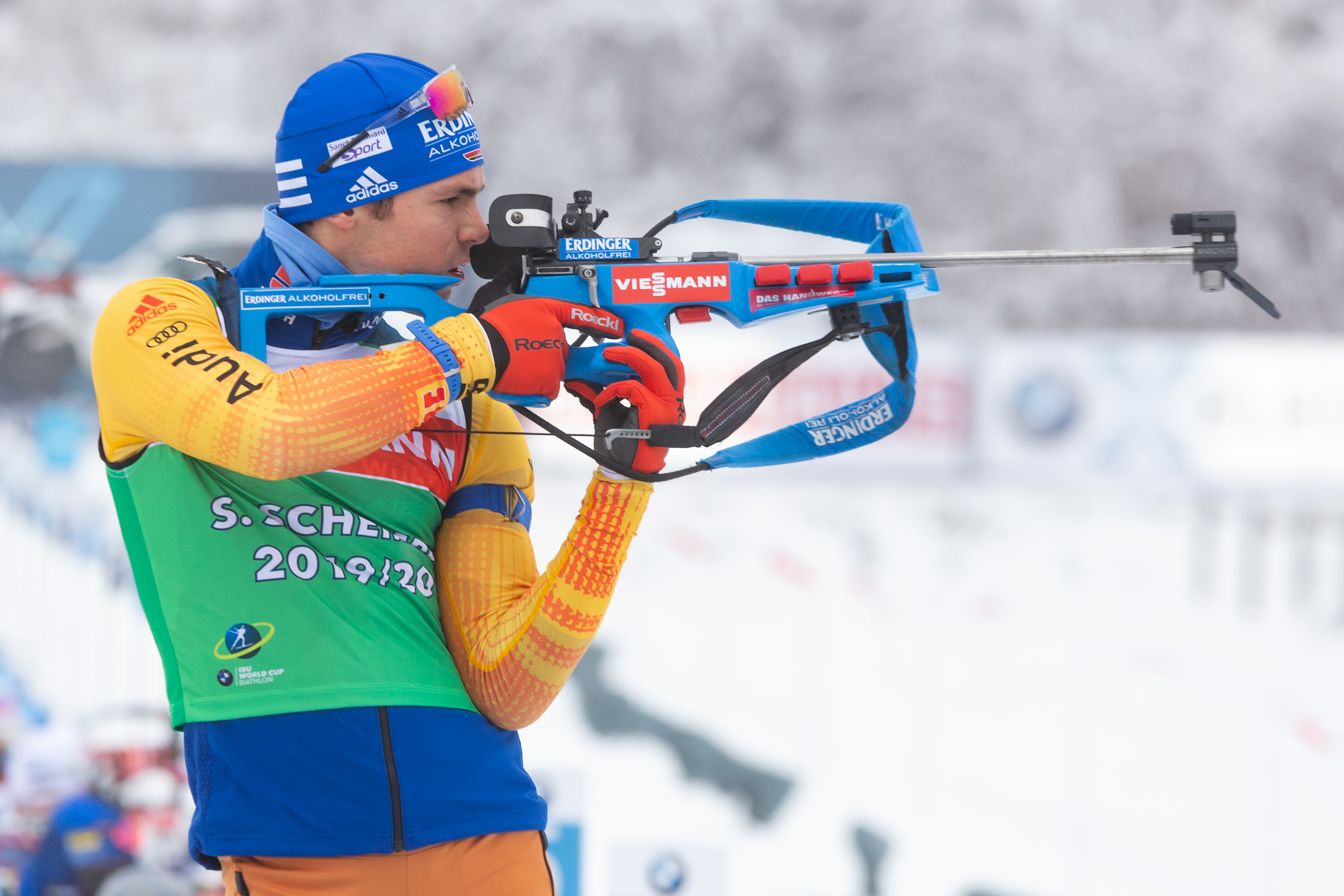
Anschütz Fortner rifle with stainless steel barrel used by Simon Schempp at the 2020 Oberhof Biathlon World Cup

Anschütz 1827 Fortner is a straight-pull action biathlon rifle designed by Peter Fortner Jr. and produced in cooperation with J. G. Anschütz. The rifle has been dominant in the sport of biathlon since the late 1980s, and is the current sport standard. It is estimated to be used by 97% of biathlon competitors worldwide. About 7000 had been manufactured by 2007.

== History ==
Anschütz has been producing biathlon rifles since 1976. The design of the 1827 Fortner action dates back to 1984, when Peter Fortner was having beers with Peter Angerer from West Germany who recently had taken the individual biathlon gold at the 1984 Winter Olympics. Angerer expressed that he wanted a rifle which could match those used by Soviet and East German competitors. Fortner took the challenge and within a few months developed and patented what was to become known as the "Fortner action", with the 1827 Fortner introduced around 1984. The Fortner action is produced by Fortner Waffen under licence from Anschütz, and are marketed as Anschütz rifles.

== Technical ==
Anschütz Fortner rifles come with the Anschütz 5020 trigger which has an adjustable pull weight from 90 to 650 g (0.20 to 1.43 lb). The trigger can be adjusted to function either as a single or two stage trigger. The straight-pull mechanism uses seven hardened steel ball bearings evenly positioned around the rear of the bolt as locking elements. When the bolt handle is pushed forward, it moves a locking piece called the bolt clamping sleeve forward, forcing the ball bearings out to lock into a negative recess in the receiver. There are no matching negative shaped (concave) recesses in the receiver. That would be very hard to practically produce at the required precision level. Instead there is a simple continuous semi-round groove machined for the ball bearings to lock into. The locking piece retracts when the bolt handle is pulled back, allowing the locking bearings to retract into the bolt body so the bolt can open. The bolt can be classified as a semi-rigid type, since the locking elements are movably mounted on the bolt. This mechanism was patented in 1984 and has expired. The 1827 F has a lock time around 1.7 milliseconds, which together with a dwell time (ignition delay plus barrel time) of around 2.3 ms gives a total time of around 4 ms from activation of trigger to the bullet has exited the barrel.

In order to prevent damage to the firing pin during dry fire, an optional firing pin buffer (also called "Dry Fire Donut") must be installed by the user.

The barreled action is produced by Fortner Waffen, and has a length of 730 mm. Although having been produced for nearly 40 years, the barreled action has not changed very much. All accessories and other parts are compatible across all production years. For example, triggers from any production year are technically the same and compatible. The main improvement has been in the barrel, as some early models featured non-nitrated barrels, but these are rare to find. Barrels are not threaded but press-fitted to the receiver, and can be changed by a competent gunsmith. Like other high end .22 LR competition barrels from Anschütz, the muzzle is choked, presumably to achieve better performance in cold weather. The action has a safety catch located on the side of the receiver, with "S" indicating Sicherung (meaning "safety" in German) and "F" indicating Feuer (meaning "fire" in German).

The factory stocks are produced by Anschütz, and the stock design has changed a bit during the years. The current Anschütz design has an adjustable cheek rest and length of pull so that it can be fitted to different athletes. It has not been uncommon for athletes to purchase custom or aftermarket stocks from other brands, and these are not always adjustable.

1827 F magazines are compatible with curved .22 LR magazines for the Anschütz 1400 and 1700 sporting series, as well as the magazine fed version of Anschütz 54 and 64 target actions. However, magazines specifically made for biathlon differ by having a special base plate for ease of use with gloves.

The sight adjustment for the 1827 F is most commonly clockwise (CW) with a click value of 0.06 mrad, which translates to 3 mm at the 50 meter distance used in competitions (or equivalently, 6 mm when training outdoor at 100 m and 0.9 mm when training indoor at 15 m).

The main competitor to the 1827 F today is the 7-3 and 7-4 Series toggle rifles made by Russian Izhmash, and both mechanisms require only around a 2.5 kilogram-force to cycle, and can be cycled in under 1 second. However, with the Fortner straight-pull action, the shooter closes the bolt using their thumb, allowing the index finger to get on the trigger blade faster.

== Predecessors ==
Other biathlon rifles formerly produced by Anschütz include the Anschütz 1427B Biathlon built on a Match 54 14XX action, the Anschütz 1827 (not to be confused with the 1827 Fortner) built on a Match 54 18XX action and the Anschütz 64R Biathlon built on a Match 64 action.

== Trivia ==
Anschütz barrels have been known for their high quality, and was used in production of some Izhmash Bi 7-3 biathlon rifles in the 1990s. These rifles are designated BI-7-4A.

Krico 360S straight-pull (sometimes referred to as S1 or SI) was mechanically equivalent to the Anschütz 1827.

The Anschütz 1727 F is a straight-pull hunting rifle chambered in .17 HMR or .17 HM2 and produced since 2013 which has taken a lot of inspiration from the 1827 F biathlon rifle. While the two designs have similarities, like the locking mechanism designed by Peter Fortner, their parts are for the most part not compatible. The stock inlets are however the same.

== See also ==
- Heym SR 30, another straight-pull action designed by Peter Fortner for full-power cartridges
- Blaser R8
