= Nordic shooting with cross-country running =

Biathlon discipline

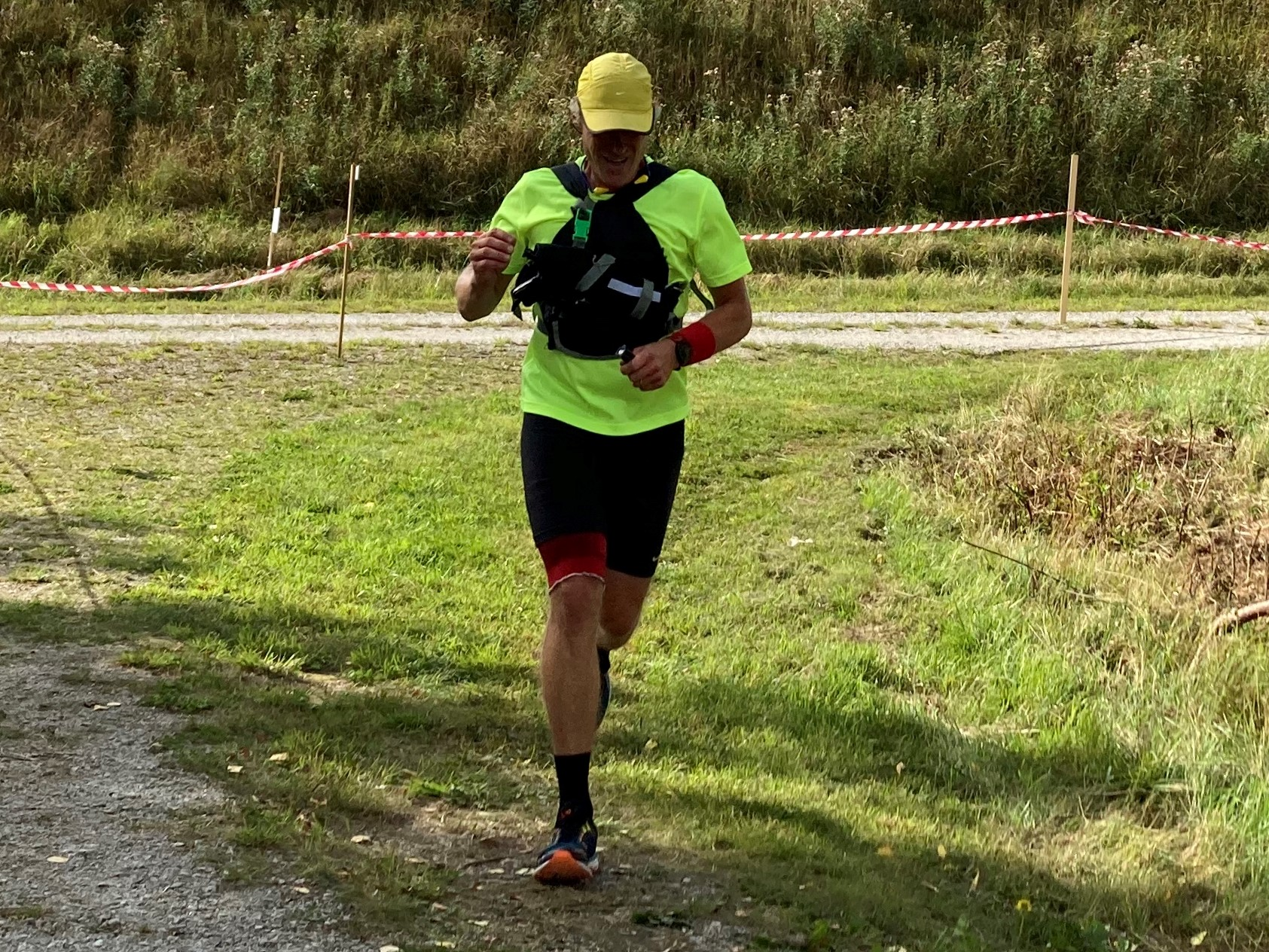
Competitor in the summer variant running past the shooting range (Swedish springskytte championship, 2020)

Nordic shooting with cross-country running, also known as running biathlon (Norwegian: skogsløp med skyting, Swedish: springskytte, Danish: terrænløb), is a biathlon discipline combining running and shooting.

== Norway ==
In Norway, skogsløp med skyting (literally "running with shooting") is a summer variant of the Nordic field biathlon, where competitors run and shoot using fullbore rifles. Events are organized by Det frivillige Skyttervesen. The running distance typically ranges from 2 to 3 kilometres, and competitors shoot two to three times during the race. Unlike the winter biathlon, athletes do not carry their firearms while running; instead, rifles are stored in racks near the shooting range.

Competitions are held in either the "normal" or "sprint" formats. The Norwegian normal program championship is part of the annual Landsskytterstevnet, while the sprint championship is held later in the autumn. Unlike other disciplines in the organization, Nordic shooting with cross-country running and Nordic field biathlon divide competitors into male and female classes.

== Sweden ==
In Sweden, springskytte (literally "running with shooting") is a summer variant of pistol biathlon, combining running with shooting using pistols or revolvers. The discipline is sanctioned by the Swedish Pistol Shooting Association (Svenska Pistolskytteförbundet), and the Swedish Pistol Biathlon Championship has been held annually since the early 1990s. The competition is open to civilians, and has also been popular among police officers.

Historically, rifle-based running and shooting events were organized by the now-defunct Frivilliga Skytterörelsen.

== Denmark ==
In Denmark, terrænløb (literally "terrain running") competitions are arranged by the Danish Gymnastics and Sports Associations (DGI Shooting).

== See also ==
- Biathlon
- Summer biathlon
- Nordic field biathlon
- Moose biathlon
- ISSF Target Sprint
- Biathlon orienteering
