= ISSF Target Sprint =

The Target Sprint is a summer shooting sport discipline that combines running and air rifle shooting. It is treated as a race, with contestants running 3 x 400 meters with two 10m rifle shooting sessions in between. The shooting rounds are not timed per se, but missed shots result in time being added to the contestant's total. The athletic sports is run under ISSF

== See also ==
- IBU Summer Biathlon
- Nordic shooting with cross-country running, a Nordic combined running and shooting sport using fullbore rifles
- Biathlon orienteering
- Modern pentathlon
- Roller skiing
