= Landsskytterstevnet =

Norwegian rifle championship

Landsskytterstevnet (lit. 'The national shooter meeting') is the Norwegian national rifle championship for all the disciplines within Det frivillige Skyttervesen and is one of Norway's largest annual sporting events. Men and women of all ages contend for the title as either "Shooting King" or "Shooting Queen" (class 3-5), and "Shooting Prince" or "Shooting Princess" (class 1-2).

The tournament has been held more or less annually since 1893, predating Norway's independence from Sweden-Norway by 12 years. Since the 1980's, it has usually been held in the outskirts of a small or medium-sized town. The tournament was not held from 1940 through 1945, possibly due to the mass athlete boycott of Nasjonal Samling's hosting of any sort of sporting events during World War II.

As of the 2025 edition, the main disciplines are 100m and 200m long-distance rifle target shooting. After the qualifiers, the finals in each major age/gender category are broadcast live on NRK and has the contestants shoot 35 shots at targets, with each shot scoring 0-10 depending on how close to the centre the shots are. As of after the 2025 edition, no contestants have shot a perfect 350 frame; 5 winners in the senior categories have shot 349. The most-winning athlete is Lars L. Ese d.y., who won 4 times in 1947, 1951, 1954, and 1955.

Smaller disciplines include Nordic shooting with cross-country running, open-terrain target shooting, and Stang shooting, which include winner awards of their own.

Since none of the disciplines or distances at Landsskytterstevnet are contested at shooting at the Summer Olympics, Landsskytterstevnet is by far the most prestigious event in Norway within its disciplines.
