= Glen Eberle =

American biathlete (born 1963)

Personal information
- Born: May 6, 1963 (age 63) Bellevue, Washington, United States

Sport
- Sport: Biathlon

Glen Eberle (born May 6, 1963) is an American biathlete. He competed in the 20 km individual event at the 1984 Winter Olympics.

In the late 1980s he became known for his lightweight biathlon rifle stock designs, which played a substantial part in setting the current rifle equipment weight limit of 3.5 kg for competitions in the International Biathlon Union.

He then joined the military and started a company making top notch outdoor equipment.
