= Finnish Hunters' Association =

- Suomen Metsästäjäliitto
- Headquarters: Riihimäki
- Executive director: Jaakko Silpola
- Website: metsastajaliitto.fi

The Finnish Hunters' Association (Finnish: Suomen Metsästäjäliitto) is Finland's largest voluntary association of hunters, consisting of over 2,500 hunting clubs and over 150,000 members. The association was founded in 1921, and today consists of 16 district organizations. Its headquarters are located in Riihimäki. It is a member of the European hunters association FACE as well as the National Defence Training Association of Finland.

A member magazine called Jahti–Jakt is published by the association four times a year. The magazine is distributed to all members of the association, but it is also possible to subscribe for the magazine without being a member.

The goal of the association is to promote the interests of Finnish hunters and hunting club activities. This includes:

- Involvement in forming domestic and international hunting policies.
- Providing training and educational material for hunters.
- Organize youth camps and other youth activities.
- Maintain responsibility for Finnish hunting oriented shooting competitions (such as moose biathlon) and promote shooting ranges.
- Promotes Finnish hunting culture, for example by the founding of the Finnish Hunting Museum - Suomen Metsästysmuseo (founded in 1930).
- Publish hunting literature.

The association has received grants from the Finnish Ministry of Education and Culture.

== Shooting sport disciplines ==
The Finnish Hunters' Association hosts competition shooting in the following disciplines:

- 100 meter running moose.
- Compak Sporting.
- 100 meter running deer.
- Air rifle on balloons (ilmaluodikko)
- Air rifle on moose target (ilmahirvi).
- Moose biathlon (hirvenhiihto) and moose shooting with cross-country running (hirvenjuoksu).
- Hunting rifle.
- Nordic hunting shooting.
- Trap.

== See also ==
- Norwegian Association of Hunters and Anglers
