= Biathlon orienteering =

Type of biathlon combining orienteering and shooting

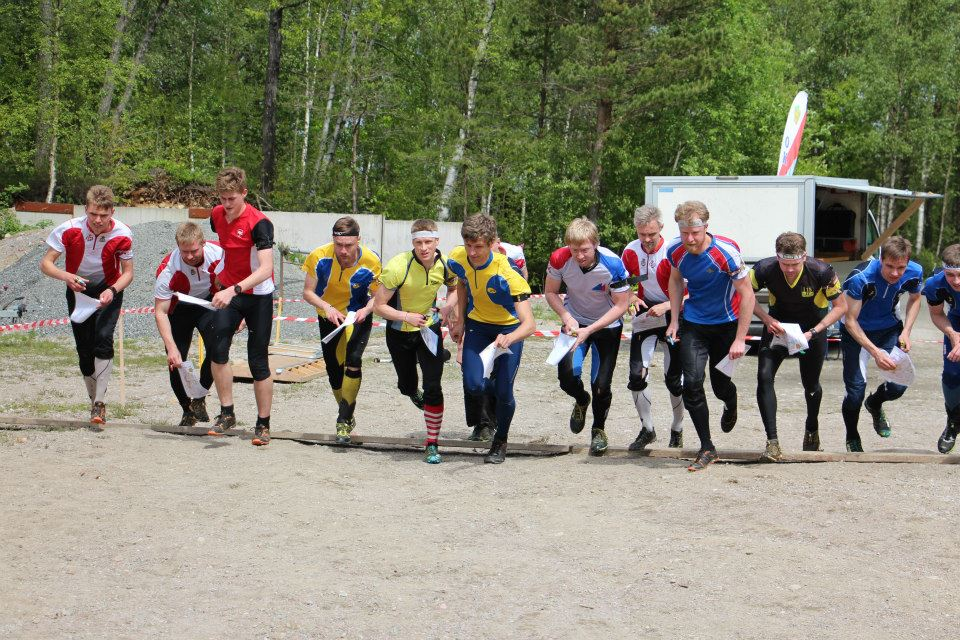
From a mass start in orienteering shooting.

Biathlon orienteering or orienteering shooting is a multisport consisting of shooting and orienteering. The sport is organized internationally by the International Biathlon Orienteering Federation (IBOF), and is mainly practiced in the Nordic countries as well as a few other European countries. Competitions are organised in Denmark by Danish Military Sports Association (DMSA), in Sweden by the civilian Swedish Multisport Association and in Finland by the Finnish Reservist Sports Federation (FRSF).

== Name ==
In other languagages the sport is known by names such as: Norwegian: orienteringsskyting, Swedish: orienteringsskytte, Danish: biathlon orientering and Finnish: ampumasuunnistus.

== Competition rules ==
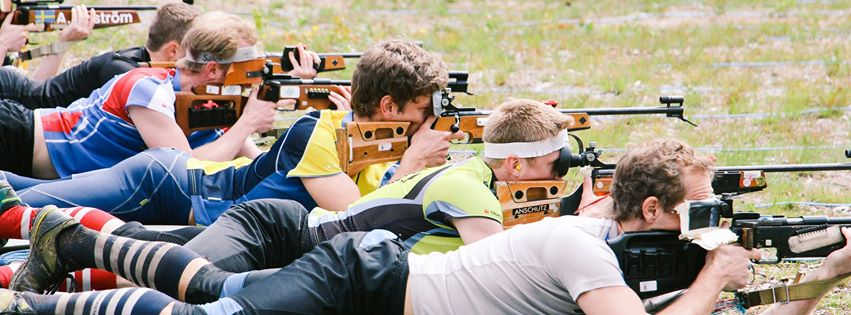
Shooting during a competition.

An orienteering competition consists of a shooting part as well as an orienteering part. The orienteering format can either be freestyle (classic) and/or point orienteering.

=== Freestyle/classic orienteering ===
In freestyle orienteering the participant must follow a given route. The distance may vary, but must follow guidelines from the International Biathlon Orienteering Federation (IBOF) according to how long the organizer estimates that the competition will take. The estimated running time is gender neutral, which means that men usually must run a longer distance.

=== Shooting ===
The shooting is usually conducted using biathlon rifles chambered for .22 LR at a distance of 50 meters towards self indicating steel targets. A miss results in a penalty lap or an added penalty time. The target sizes correspond to those used in biathlon, which means a diameter of 45 mm for prone and 115 mm for standing shooting, which equates to angular sizes of 0.9 mrad and 2.3 mrad respectively. The firearm is usually placed at the firing line during the orienteering part.

=== Point orienteering ===
A point orienteering is usually 3 km long, and the map only provides the first checkpoint. At each checkpoint, a template can be placed over the map to mark the next checkpoint using a needle. Usually there are around ten checkpoints, of which five are along a trail and five off the trail. The maps of each competitor is checked after the finish, and for every millimeter missed the athlete receives a one-minute time penalty.

== Disciplines ==
=== Classic distance ===
The classic distance consists of the parts freestyle orienteering, point orienteering and shooting. The participants start with point orienteering, and then move on to the freestyle orienteering. When the participant has finished their orienteering, the participant goes over to the firing line and fire ten shots prone, followed by a round of running, before ending their run with standing shooting. When the shooting is over, the clock stops. The distance of the freestyle orienteering should correspond to 45–60 minutes for the winner, and for each missed shot a penalty time of 2 minutes is added. The winner is the one with the shortest total time.

=== Sprint distance ===
The sprint format has interval starts, and all competitors run one round before lying down for the first shooting. Any missed shots result in penalty laps which must be completed immediately. Then follows a new round of orienteering, before the sprint ends with five shots standing (plus any applicable penalty laps). The orienteering part in total should take about 18 minutes for the best runner, while one penalty lap should correspond to about 45 seconds.

=== Mass start distance ===
The mass start format has many similarities to the sprint format, except that everyone in the same class starts at the same time. In addition, the orienteering is extended with three to four rounds of running, as well as four extra shots. The orienteering part is meant to take a total of 80 minutes for the best runner, while the penalty rounds should correspond to 60 seconds.

=== Relay ===
Relay teams consist of two or three athletes. Every athlete perform the running part in the same way as a sprint, except that the course is longer and that up to three extra rounds can be used in the shooting part. The penalty loop should correspond to 90 seconds for the best athlete.

== World Champions ==
Year	Discipline	Men	Women
2017	Classic Distance	Johan Eikeblad	Karin Steinback
2017	Sprint	Antti Iivari	Nella Keskinen
2017	Relay	Finland	Sweden

== See also ==
- Nordic field biathlon
- Nordic shooting with cross-country running
- Moose biathlon
