= FX Airguns =

Swedish air rifle manufacturer

FX Airguns AB
- Industry: Airguns
- Founded: 1999; 27 years ago
- Founder: Fredrik Axelsson
- Headquarters: Mariestad, Sweden
- Area served: Worldwide
- Products: Air rifles
- Website: fxairguns.com

FX Airguns AB is a Swedish manufacturer of air rifles based in Mariestad, Västra Götaland. Founded by Fredrik Axelsson in 1999, the company is known for its extensive line of competition and hunting pre-charged pneumatic (PCP) rifles.

FX Airguns is known in the industry for its proprietary "Smooth Twist" barrels, which uses hybrid riflings with a long smoothbore portion and press-forged slow-twist riflings near the muzzle. FX later introduced the "Smooth Twist X" barrels in 2017, which allow the user to easily switch barrels of different calibers and different twist rates. FX air rifles are also known for innovative features such as the interchangeable air tubes and the power adjuster wheel, as well as the ability to shoot arrows in some models. The company is one of the first manufacturers to produce modular airguns.

In 2021, FX Airguns employee Philip Jönsson won the gold medal in the mixed 10m air rifle standing SH2 event at the 2020 Summer Paralympics held in Tokyo, Japan. Philip is the first athlete with Duchenne muscular dystrophy to win a Paralympic gold medal.

== History ==
Fredrik Axelsson had been an avid airgun enthusiast since he started shooting since 5 years of age. At the end of 1989, he started making things for airguns after being disappointed by an English-made .22 caliber spring-piston air rifle he purchased for shooting pigeons in a tree, with which he had done very little actual shooting because the spring broke after a couple of months. As a result, Axelsson made his own gas ram, but he didn't like the recoil despite it working quite well. He then started experimenting and making other kinds of airguns, including a 9mm CO_{2} rifle and a 20-gauge air shotgun with replaceable chokes. After experimenting with pump pneumatic rifles, Axelsson then moved to develop PCP rifles.

In 1994, Axelsson came up with the original design for the Independence rifle. As there wasn't a lot of SCUBA diving activities in Sweden, one of the problems needing to be addressed was the difficulty finding gas cylinders to recharge the rifles. Axelsson developed a three-stage hand pump that alleviated this difficulty of refilling PCP airguns. In 1995, he took the ideas to a local company and started production of the hand pump. He then took the pump off the Independence rifle and sold it to Webley & Scott, which later became the Webley Axsor rifle. Around the same time, he also made the Timberwolf rifle.

Axelsson's partnership with that company ended in May 1999, when he resigned without taking any of his patents and went on to create FX Airguns, his own company. After Webley & Scott agreed to a manufacturing contract on the condition that any new products FX developed must fit into the Axsor stocks, Axelsson made the FX2000. In 2000, Axelsson came up with a patent on a new pump and an electrical air compressor, followed by the Cyclone rifle in 2001.

In 2001, Axelsson considered entering the American market, as the American regulations for airguns are less restrictive and there was already a sizeable enthusiast population in North America. He contacted American airgun collector Ingvar Alm for advice, who recommended the retailer Airguns of Arizona. AOA's president Robert Buchanan agreed to have samples of the FX2000 and the Excalibur rifles, and was very impressed by the rifle's accuracy and light weight (due to Axelsson's design of light hammers striking small valves). Axelsson was also unhappy with his Italian supplier of stocks at the time, so FX started to build their own machines that would make the synthetic stocks they wanted. FX's venture into the North American markets has been a great success, and in 2009 Axelsson decided to shift the company's main focus to America due to the commercial freedom and more innovation-friendly consumer mindset compared to markets in Europe.

In 2005, after having some issues with barrels supplied by other contractors, Axelsson decided that the company needed to make their own barrels, and started developing a smoothbore-rifled bore combination design, which later became the company's proprietary "Smooth Twist" rifling. After showing his project to British airgun specialist Ben Taylor in 2007, Taylor gave Axelsson the idea of making the rifling by impressing the barrel from the outside, which allowed FX to make quality barrels fast.

In 2012, Axelsson used the FX Boss air rifle to win the annual Extreme Benchrest competition held at Green Valley, Arizona, where 4 others out of the top 10 competitors also used FX air rifles. Since then, FX air rifles have become increasingly popular among competition shooters, with nearly 3/4 of the top 20 Extreme Benchrest competitors in both "Pro" and "Sportsman" classes using FX airguns in 2017.

== Current product line ==
- Biathlon
- Bobcat Mk II (bullpup)
- Boss
- Cyclone (Now discontinued)
- Crown
- Dreamline (modular design)
- DRS
- Dynamic
- Gladiator MkII
- Impact (bullpup)
  - Impact X (bullpup)
    - Impact MK2 (bullpup)
      - Impact M3 (bullpup)
        - Impact M4 (bullpup)
- Independence
- Indy (bullpup)
  - Indy Arrow (bullpup)
- King
- Maverick
- Monsoon (semi-automatic, discontinued 2018)
- Panthera
- Ranchero
- Revolution (semi-automatic, discontinued 2018)
- Royale 300
- Royale 400
  - Royal 400 Arrow
- Royale 500
- Streamline
- T12
  - T12 Whisper
- Typhoon
- Verminator Mk II
  - Verminator Mk II Extreme
- Wildcat (bullpup)
  - Wildcat Mk II (aka. "WarCat", upcoming, bullpup)
    - Wildcat MKIII
