= Moose biathlon =

Winter sport event

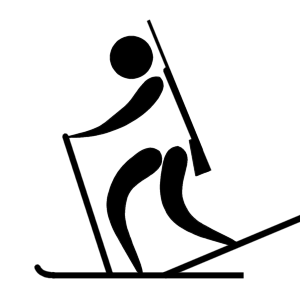
Pictograms of Olympic sports - Biathlon

Moose biathlon (Finnish: Hirvenhiihto) is a winter sport variation of biathlon, which combines cross-country skiing, range estimation of paper targets resembling a moose, and rifle shooting using fullbore biathlon rifles. The Finnish Hunters' Association holds competitions, which were first developed in Finland in the 1970s. Today, competitions are held in Finland and Sweden with a goal of becoming a Nordic discipline. There are over 10,000 competitors in Sweden and Finland, with over 600 competitors participating in the yearly Finnish Championship.

The skiing event is performed in classic style over a distance of 7–9 kilometres (4.3–5.6 mi), while competitors carry the rifle. However, competitors under the age of 16 are not required to carry the rifle themselves. Range estimation and shooting take place at designated spots along the ski course. The shooting component consists of ten rounds fired from a standing position at a distance of 100 metres (330 ft). The rifle must comply with legal requirements for hunting moose. During the range estimation component, competitors must judge the distance to two moose figures placed somewhere between 50 and 200 metres (160 and 660 ft).

The winner of the Moose Biathlon is determined by a point system, with a maximum of 1200 points available throughout the competition. The shooting component awards up to 600 points, calculated by multiplying the target scores by six. The range estimation component has 300 points available, with two points deducted for each meter of error. The skiing component awards the fastest competitor 300 points, with other competitors receiving points based on how far behind the fastest skier they finish. One point is deducted per 10 seconds. For example, if a competitor finishes 50 seconds behind the fastest skier, they are awarded 295 points from the skiing component of the competition. In most races, the oldest competitors receive full skiing points to avoid life-threatening illnesses.

A relay race version of Moose Biathlon exists, where each team member fires five rounds at a moose target and estimates the range of only one moose figure instead of two. Penalties apply for missed shots or errors in range estimation.

In contrast, Moose Shooting with Running (Finnish: Hirvenjuoksu) is a summer variation of Moose Biathlon where skiing is replaced with a 4–5 kilometres (2.5–3.1 mi) run. Firearms are not carried during the run but are instead placed in a rack near the shooting location.

== See also ==
- Nordic field biathlon, another Nordic biathlon variant using fullbore rifles.
- Nordic shooting with cross-country running, a summer variant of Nordic field biathlon.
- Biathlon orienteering
