= Swedish Shooting Sport Federation =

Sport shooting governing body in Sweden

The Swedish Shooting Sport Federation (Swedish: Svenska Skyttesportförbundet, SvSF) is a Swedish sport shooting association founded in 2009 by merging the three former organisations Swedish Sport Shooting Association (Svenska Sportskytteförbundet, SSF), Frivilliga Skytterörelsen (FSR) and Skytterörelsens Ungdomsorganisation (Skytte UO). In addition to being their well-known Nordic shooting disciplines, they are also affiliated internationally with the International Shooting Sport Federation (ISSF), Fédération Internationale de Tir aux Armes Sportives de Chasse (FITASC) and the International Precision Rifle Federation (IPRF).

== See also ==
- Swedish Dynamic Sports Shooting Association
- Norwegian Shooting Association and Det frivillige Skyttervesen
- Danish Gymnastics and Sports Associations
