= Nordic Field Biathlon =

Nordic combined skiing and shooting sport

Nordic field biathlon (Norwegian: skifeltskyting) is a combined cross-country skiing and shooting sport discipline within Det frivillige Skyttervesen. The sport is considered a close predecessor to olympic biathlon, with the main difference being the use of fullbore biathlon rifles and paper targets placed in the terrain with time penalties added for misses. The skiing is usually performed in classic style, while freestyle on is permitted in some races. The number of shots and length of the skiing part can vary. Contrary to the other exercises in the organization, Nordic shooting with cross-country running and Nordic Field Biathlon competitors are divided into male and female competitive divisions.

== See also ==
- Moose biathlon, another Nordic biathlon variant using fullbore rifles
- Nordic shooting with cross-country running, the summer variant of Nordic Field Biathlon
- Biathlon orienteering
