= Frivilliga Skytterörelsen =

Swedish sport shooting association

Frivilliga Skytterörelsen (FSR) (lit. Voluntary Shooting Movement), formerly known as Frivilliga Skytteväsendet, was a Swedish shooting sport association and a voluntary defense organization. They considered themselves as in 1860 by the start of the Swedish shooting movement, and together with its youth organization Ungdomsorganisation Skytte (UO) ceased to exist in 2009. The organization long had close ties to the Swedish Armed Forces and was operated with the help of government subsidies, but these gradually weakened during the years as more and more shooters wanted to separate civilian and military shooting.

The Swedish shooting movement originated in the 1860s, and in 1893 the Swedish rifle clubs formally organized themselves in Skytteförbundets överstyrelse (lit. The shooting association's governing body), an association consisting of smaller skytteföreningar from each len (county). In 1893, the organization had 16 125 members, and the member numbers increased steadily to 225,000 in 1914. In the interwar period, membership numbers dropped steadily and reached 5,0000 in 1934, before it picked up again and reached a peak with about 297,000 members in 1944. In 1961, the name of the organization was changed from Frivilliga Skytteväsendet to Frivilliga Skytterörelsen. The member mass was evenly maintained above 200 000 until the end of the 1980s, and FSR celebrated its 125-year anniversary in 1985. In 1996 the membership numbers had declined to around 100 000, and was around 48 000 in 2006.

The shooting disciplines maintained by FSR were:

- Nordic Bullseye Shooting with rifle, usually at 300 meters (gevär bana 300 m ställningar and gevär bana 300 m liggande)
- Nordic Field Shooting with rifle (fältskytte gevär)
- short-range rifle (gevär korthåll ställningar)
- Kpist (kpist bana ställningar and kpist bana liggande)
- AK 4 service rifle prone bullseye shooting (AK 4 bana liggande)
- Indoor air rifle (luftgevär)
- Falling targets with air rifle (fallmålsskjutning, luftgevär)
- Nordic Field Biathlon (skidfältskjutning, competitions held in Sweden until 2005)

Most of FSR's activities have been continued in the Swedish Shooting Sport Federation, which today is considered the sister organization of the Norwegian Shooting Association, Det frivillige Skyttervesen and the Danish Gymnastics and Sports Associations.

== See also ==
- Svenska Skyttesportförbundet
- De Danske Skytteforeninger, now a part of DGI Shooting
- Det frivillige Skyttervesen
