= C.G. Haenel =

German weapons manufacturing company

- Type: GmbH
- Founded: 1840; 186 years ago
- Founder: Carl Gottlieb Haenel
- Headquarters: Suhl, Germany
- Products: Firearms
- Revenue: € 7.15 million (2018)
- Number of employees: 9 (2018)
- Parent: Merkel
- Website: https://www.cg-haenel.de/en/

C.G. Haenel is a German weapon manufacturer located in Suhl, Germany.

== History ==
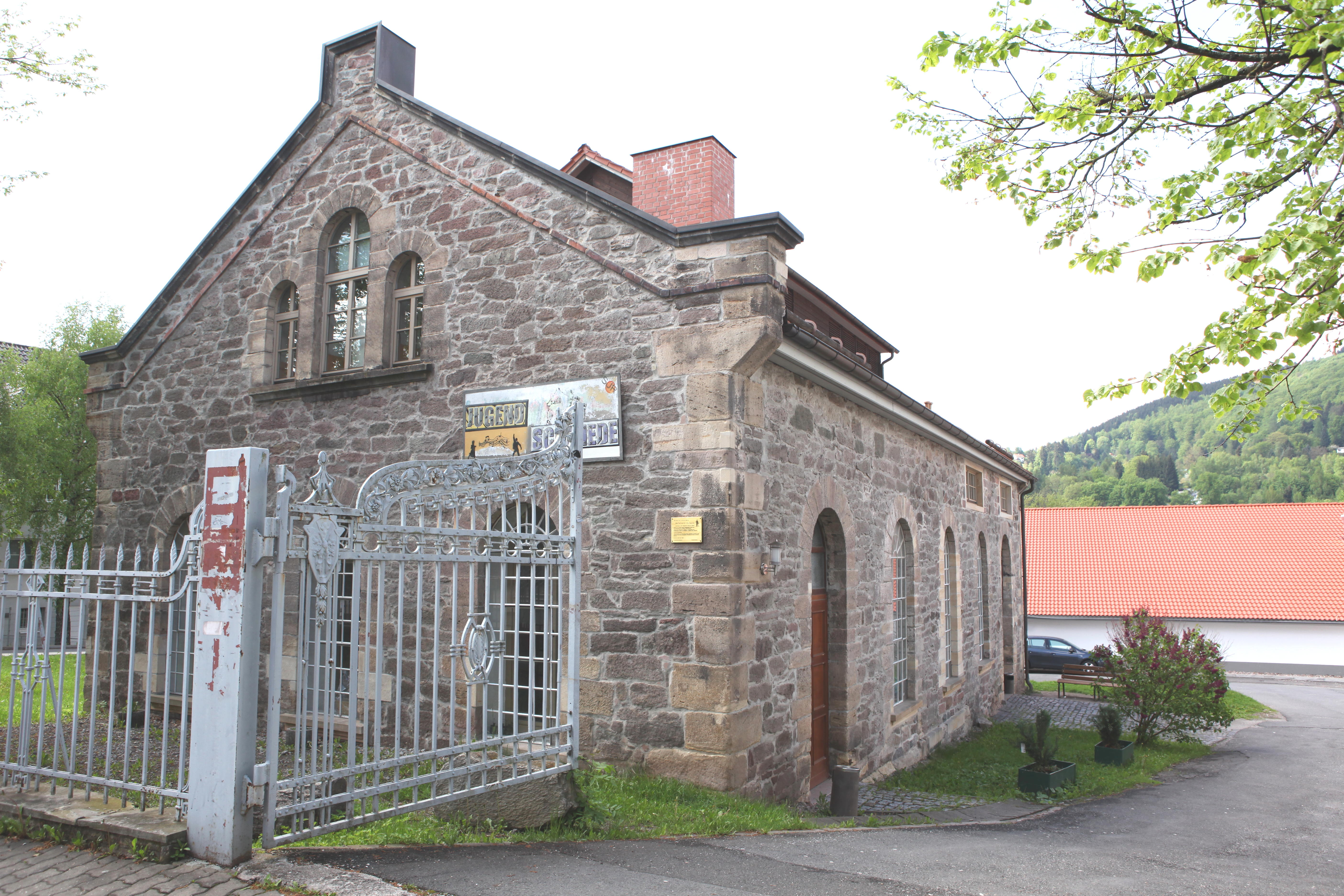
The original forge which stands at the gates of the Thuringian Forest

The Prussian commissioner for firearms manufacturing, Carl Gottlieb Haenel, began producing bicycles and weapons in 1840 — a combination which was not uncommon at the time as it required similar means of production and skills. In 1887, the Suhl-based weapons designer C. W. Aydt joined the company in order to produce his Aydt target rifle and later the Aydt target pistol for sporting. In 1879, the German Army introduced the M1879 Reichsrevolver and a smaller derivative, the M1883. Haenel was awarded a share of the manufacturing for these firearms as part of a consortium, named the Suhl Konsortium, formed with the sporting arms manufacturer V. Ch. Schilling. The firearms they produced were marked with the signature "VCS CGH Suhl" in reference to their initials and Suhl origin.

After the adoption of the Gewehr 1888 the consortium was awarded the production of cavalry and artillery carbines on its action, but after the introduction of Gewehr 98, production of which was limited to government arsenal, expensive tooling for it the company acquired suddenly became out of demand. Thus, they modernized the action, fixing the teething problems which led to the rearmament to G. 98. Those included replacement of Mannlicher-style en-bloc clip with a double-stack fixed magazine of their own design (in order not to infringe on Mauser patents). However, like the similar OEWG Exportmodell 1904, Haenel Modell 1900 and improved Modell 1909 rifles (which were widely known as Haenel-Mannlichers or Mannlicher-Haenels despite the absence of any Mannlicher influence) were not adopted by any major military (only Paraguay bought a small batch) and were not really popular as hunting and sporting firearms due to dominance of Mauser.

Haenel later produced hunting weapons, bayonets and, during World War I, produced vast quantities of the Mauser Model 98 for the German Army.

=== 1920s ===
In 1921, Hugo Schmeisser joined the company which then began manufacturing pocket pistols based on his designs. This period also marked the introduction of the automatic firearm and, despite a ban by the Treaty of Versailles, the company began developing automatic submachine guns to Schmeisser's designs. Schmeisser drew upon experience and knowledge he had gained from his father, Louis Schmeisser, otherwise known as the "Father of the Automatic Carbine" due to his work on Bergmann machine guns. In 1928, the company developed the MP28, a submachine gun derived from the MP18, and it was in use with the German police by 1928. Deliveries were also made to South Africa, Spain, Japan and the Republic of China through a license agreement with a Belgian company, named Baynard.

=== 1930s and 1940s ===
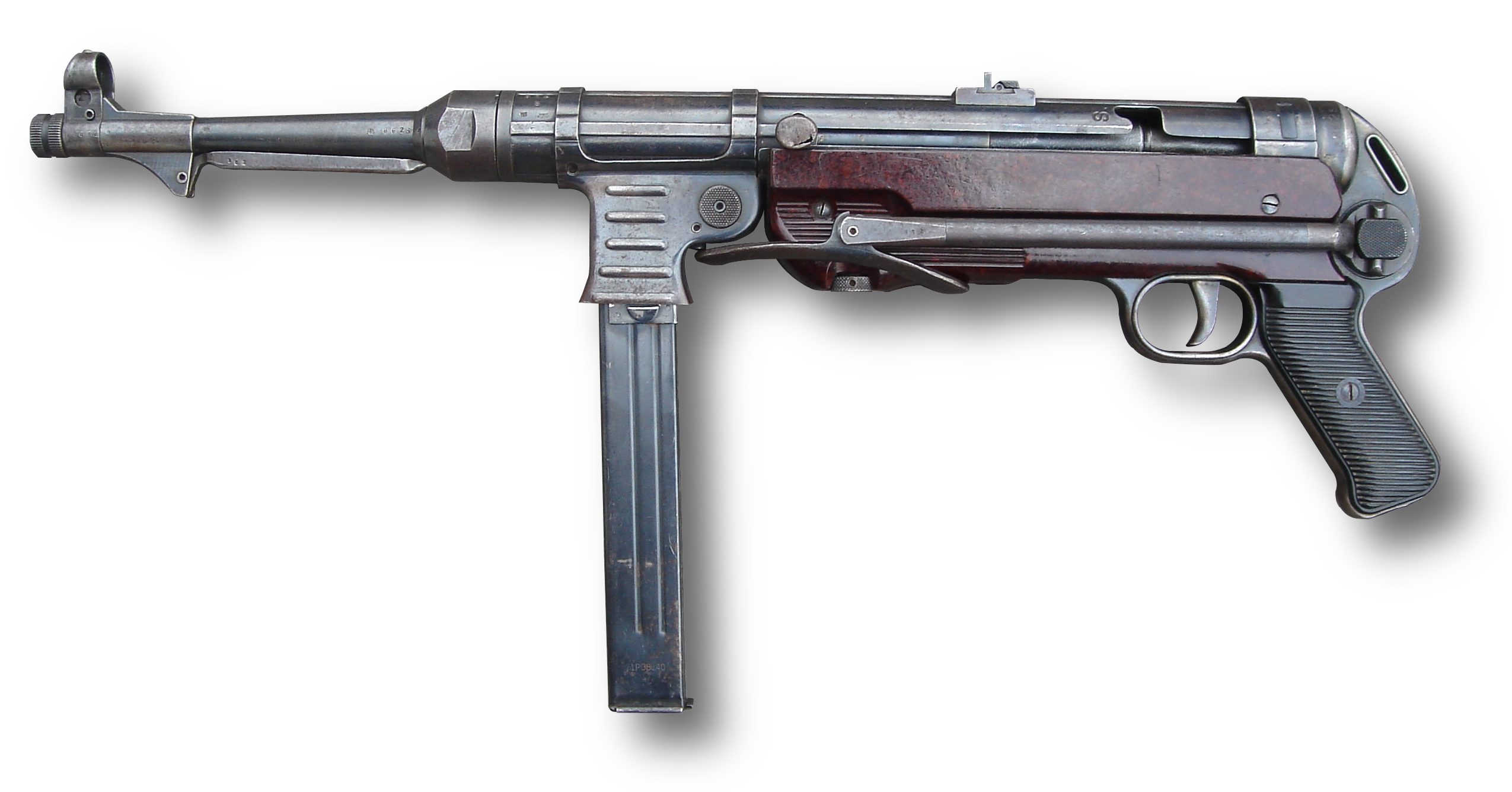
MP40 submachine gun

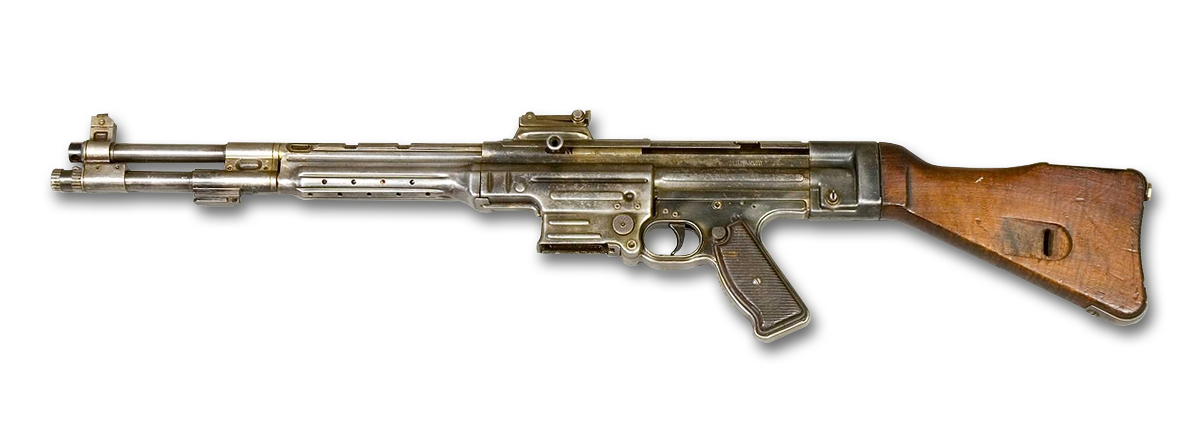
The MKb 42(H), the precursor to the StG 44 assault rifle

Despite the success of Hugo Schmeisser, the company ran into bankruptcy several times between 1929 and 1934. In 1933, the company formed an association with ten other Suhl and Zella-Mehlis arms companies to guarantee a share of armament contracts from the newly-arisen Nazi government. This association was named the United Suhl-Zella-Mehlisser Arms Factories (German: Vereinigte Suhl-Zella-Mehlisser Waffenfabriken) and had direct relations with the Wehrmacht administration. The company, along with its associates, established their own offices in Berlin.

1935 saw a dramatic increase in arms production in the build up to World War II and a new automatic firearm with an intermediate cartridge was developed. The 7.92×33mm chambered MP43 (originally known as the Mkb 42(H)) assault rifle was devised to stand out from the Erma Werke MP38/MP40 submachine gun with its higher performance and economic design which was manufactured through a then innovative factory stamping technique. Over 10,000 units were produced as early as 1943 but, in the same year, production was halted by Adolf Hitler. Hitler later approved mass production following testing with troops. On entering service, the weapon was known as the Sturmgewehr 44 (StG 44).

=== East Germany ===
Following the defeat of Nazi Germany in World War II, U.S. forces briefly occupied the city of Suhl and imposed a production ban on all arms factories. Following the evacuation of American troops, the area became occupied by the Soviet Army in what would later become East Germany. Around 50 StG 44's were transferred to the Soviet Union for technical analysis, as well as 10,785 weapon blueprints which were considered war reparations. The company was then consolidated as the VEB Vehicle and Hunting Weapons Factory "Ernst Thälmann" (German: VEB Fahrzeug- und Jagdwaffenwerk „Ernst Thälmann“) and later began producing air rifles and hunting carbines under the brand name Haenel Suhl.

=== Recent ===
In 2008, the company was reestablished and adopted its original name of C. G. Haenel. It now belongs to Merkel, which is in turn part of Caracal International in the United Arab Emirates. The company's first product in 2008 was the Haenel RS8 7.62×51mm NATO/.308 Winchester sniper rifle which, in 2009, lead to the development of a larger Haenel RS9 .338 Lapua Magnum (8.6×70mm) version. That same year saw the introduction of a new range of hunting rifles, named the Jaeger 8 series. This was followed by the single-shot Jaeger 9, the bolt action Jaeger 10, the semi-automatic SLB 2000+, which was originally developed by Heckler & Koch, and the Jaeger 11 shotgun.

In February 2016, the Bundeswehr ordered the Haenel RS9 as its new medium-range sniper rifle, designated the G29. This was followed by an order from the Hamburg Police for the company's Haenel CR 223 semi-automatic rifle in November. These were reportedly withdrawn from use in 2017 due to persistent jamming. These problems were attributed to the ammunition being used by the Hamburg Police and Haenel stated it would rectify the problem.

In January 2019, the company's MK 556 assault rifle was shortlisted alongside the Heckler & Koch HK416 and HK433 as a potential replacement for the Bundeswehr's G36 service rifle. The competition was widely expected to be won by Heckler and Koch which has supplied previous service rifles to the German military, including the most recent two, the G3 and the G36. However, despite expectations, the Bundeswehr selected the MK 556 on 15 September 2020. The contract, worth €245 million, was to deliver 120,000 rifles. On 9 October 2020, the German Federal Ministry of Defence withdrew their intended award decision, seemingly leaving the potential remaining G36 replacements as either the HK416, HK433 or MK 556 after concluding a reentered evaluation phase.

In 2021 the Jaeger NXT straight-pull rifle was introduced that differs from conventional bolt-action mechanisms in that the manipulation required from the user in order to chamber and extract a cartridge predominantly consists of a linear motion only.

== Gallery ==
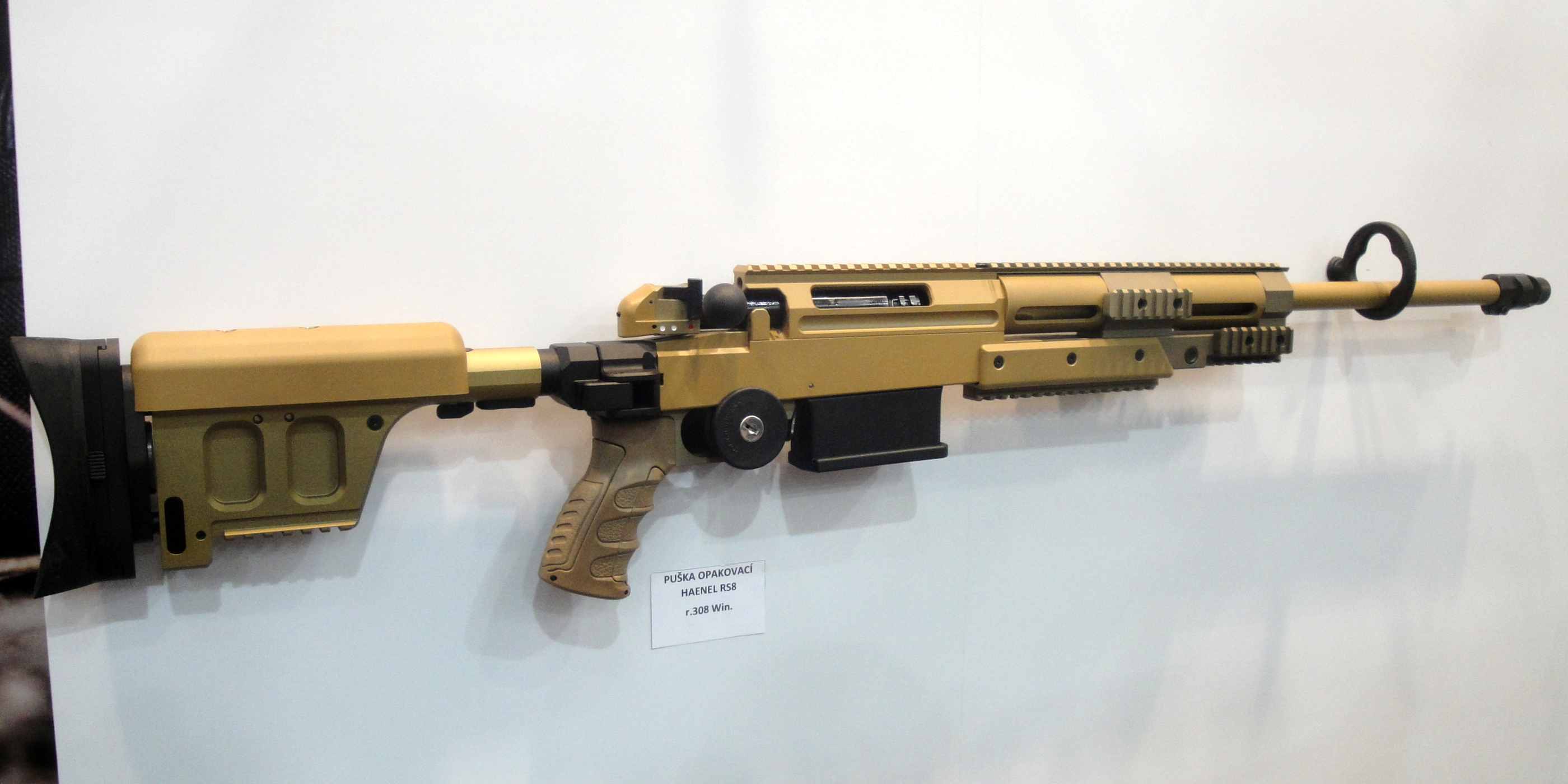
RS8 sniper rifle

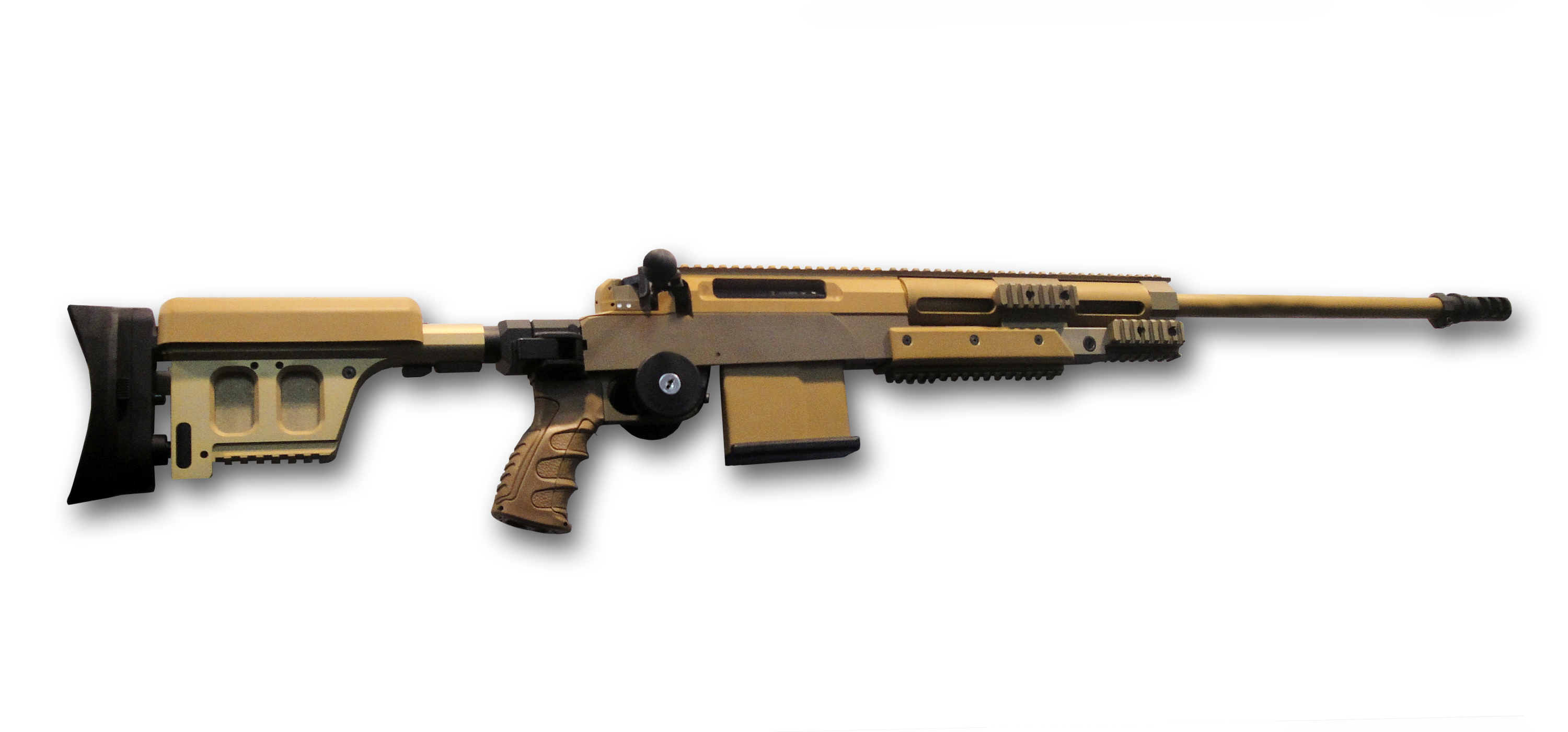
RS9 sniper rifle

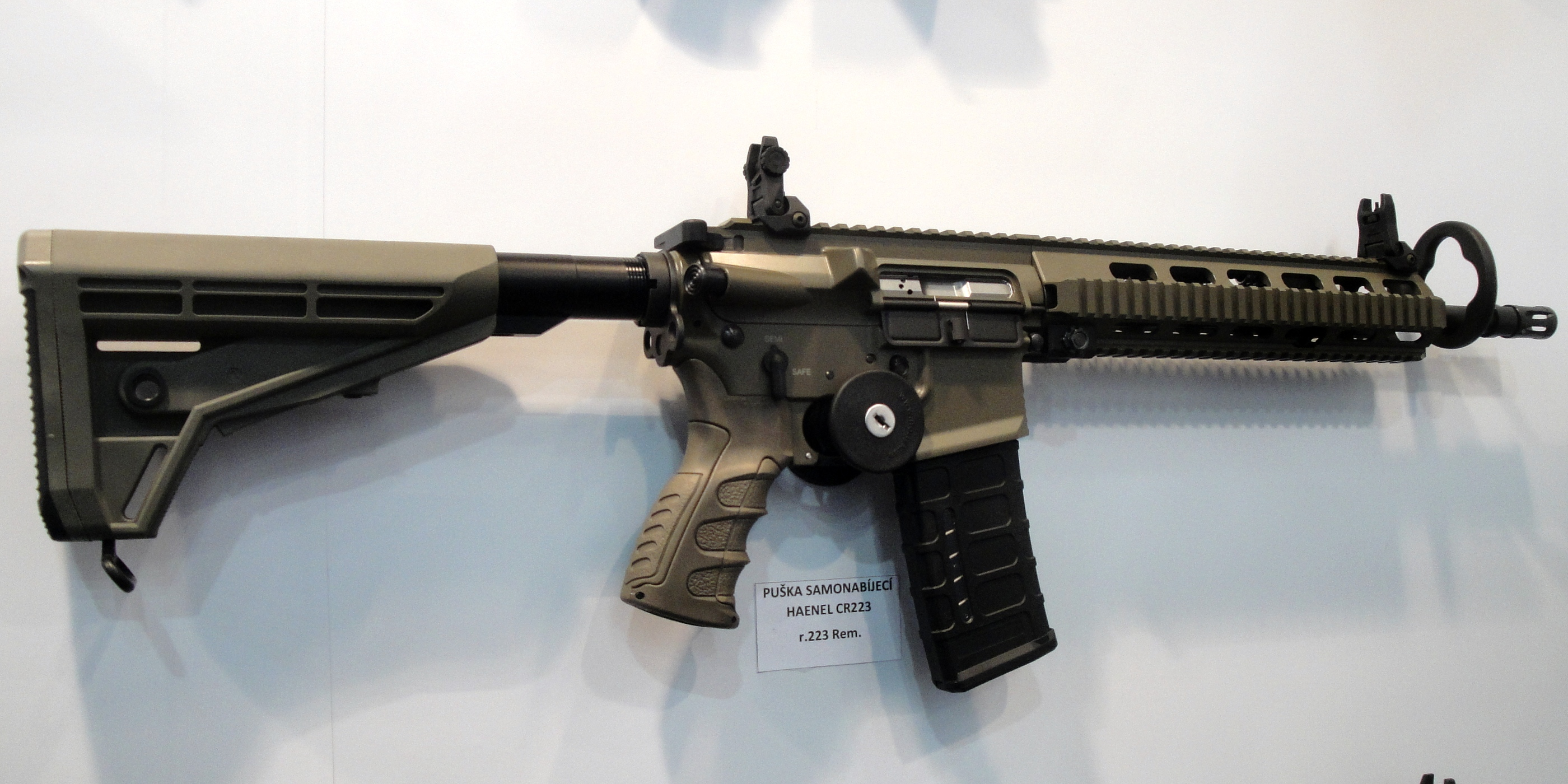
CR223 semi-automatic rifle

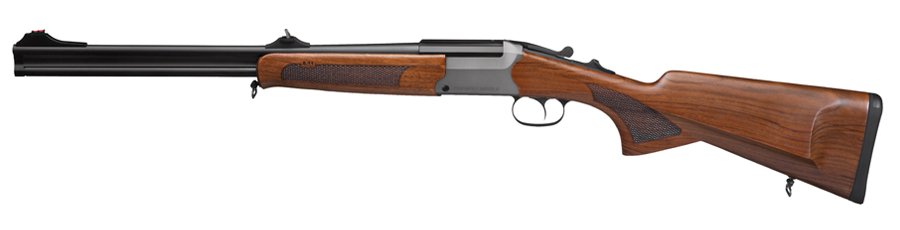
Jaeger 8.11 over under double hunting rifle

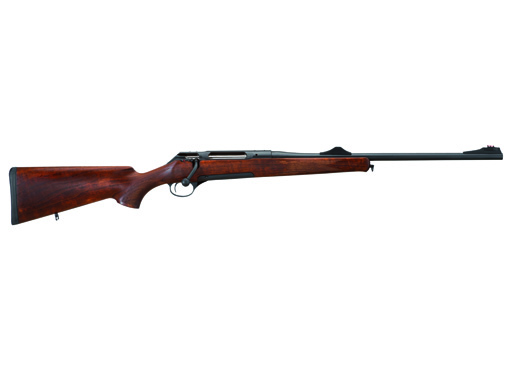
Jaeger.10 bolt action hunting rifle

== Products ==
Products manufactured by C. G. Haenel include:

- MP 38/MP 40
- Haenel 303
- HLR 338
- Sturmgewehr 44
- Haenel MK 556
- Scharfschützengewehr G29

== See also ==
- Vallon
- Nordseewerke
