= Valson =

Valson is both a given name and a surname. Notable people with the name include:

- Sunil Valson (born 1958), Indian cricketer
- Valson Thampu (fl. 1989), Indian academic and theologian

== See also ==
- Valon
