= Vallon (disambiguation) =

Vallon is a municipality.

Vallon may also refer to:

== People ==
- Annette Vallon, Frenchwoman who gave birth to William Wordsworth's daughter in 1792
- Aristide Vallon (1826—1897), French colonial governor of French Senegal, politician and counter admiral
- Colin Vallon (born 1980), Swiss jazz pianist
- Georges Vallon (1688–1767), French architect
- Harry Vallon, American gambler and mob informant in the 1910s
- K. P. Vallon (1900–1940), Indian social reformer
- Laurent Vallon (1652–1724), French architect
- Louis Vallon (1901–1981), French politician
- Marie-Catherine Vallon (1776–1851), French memoir writer
- Pierre Vallon (1927–2016), French businessman and politician
- René Vallon (1880–1911), French aviator

== Fictional characters ==
- Amsterdam Vallon and "Priest" Vallon, in the American film Gangs of New York, played by Leonardo DiCaprio and Liam Neeson, respectively
- JoAnne Vallon, in the American Western film Alias John Law
- Johnny Vallon, protagonist of a novel trilogy by Peter Cheyney, starting with You Can Call It a Day
- Porthos du Vallon, one of the Three Musketeers
- Renee Vallon, in the American Western film The Far Country, played by Corinne Calvet

== Other uses ==
- Canton of Vallon, an administrative division of the Aveyron department, France
- Lac de Vallon, a lake at Bellevaux, Haute-Savoie department, France
- La Vallon Airfield, an abandoned World War II military airfield in France
- Autoroute du Vallon, original name of Quebec Autoroute 740, Canada
- VALLON GmbH, a German manufacturer of metal detectors, magnetometer systems and demagnetization equipment

== See also ==
- Valon (given name)
- Vallon-sur-Gée, a commune in the Sarthe department, France
- Vallons-de-l'Erdre, a commune in the Loire-Atlantique department, France
- Valun (Italian: Vallòn di Cherso), a village in Croatia
