= Heym Express Magnum =

- Type: Bolt-action rifle
- Place of origin: Germany

Production history
- Manufacturer: Heym AG

Specifications
- Mass: 8,3–10.5 lbs. (depending on caliber)
- Length: 45 inches (1143 mm).
- Barrel length: 24 inches (610 mm) Hammer-Forged Krupp Steel barrel
- Cartridge: .375 H&H Magnum, .416 Rigby, .404 Jeffery, .458 Lott, .450 Rigby.
- Action: Bolt-action
- Feed system: 4 round internal magazine (depending on caliber)
- Sights: iron sights/Telescopic sight

The Heym Express Magnum is a luxury bolt-action rifle designed for the purpose of hunting big game. The rifle is available in 5 different calibers from the .375 H&H Magnum to the powerful .450 Rigby. Rather similar in appearance to the Karabiner 98k (even if more massive and with an exposed barrel), they use a Mauser-type bolt akin to the one of the aforesaid rifle, even though the bolt is much more solid in order to better handle the huge recoil. They are fitted with a 1-inch (25.4 mm) rubber recoil pad, and they have iron sights fitted on the barrel, but they can take a scope sight on the receiver.

== Models ==
- Heym Safari Express
- Heym Safari Express Light

(1988-2012)

- Heym Express by Martini (2013–present)

== See also ==
- Kar 98k
- Mauser Gewehr 1898
