= Haenel RS9 =

Sniper rifle

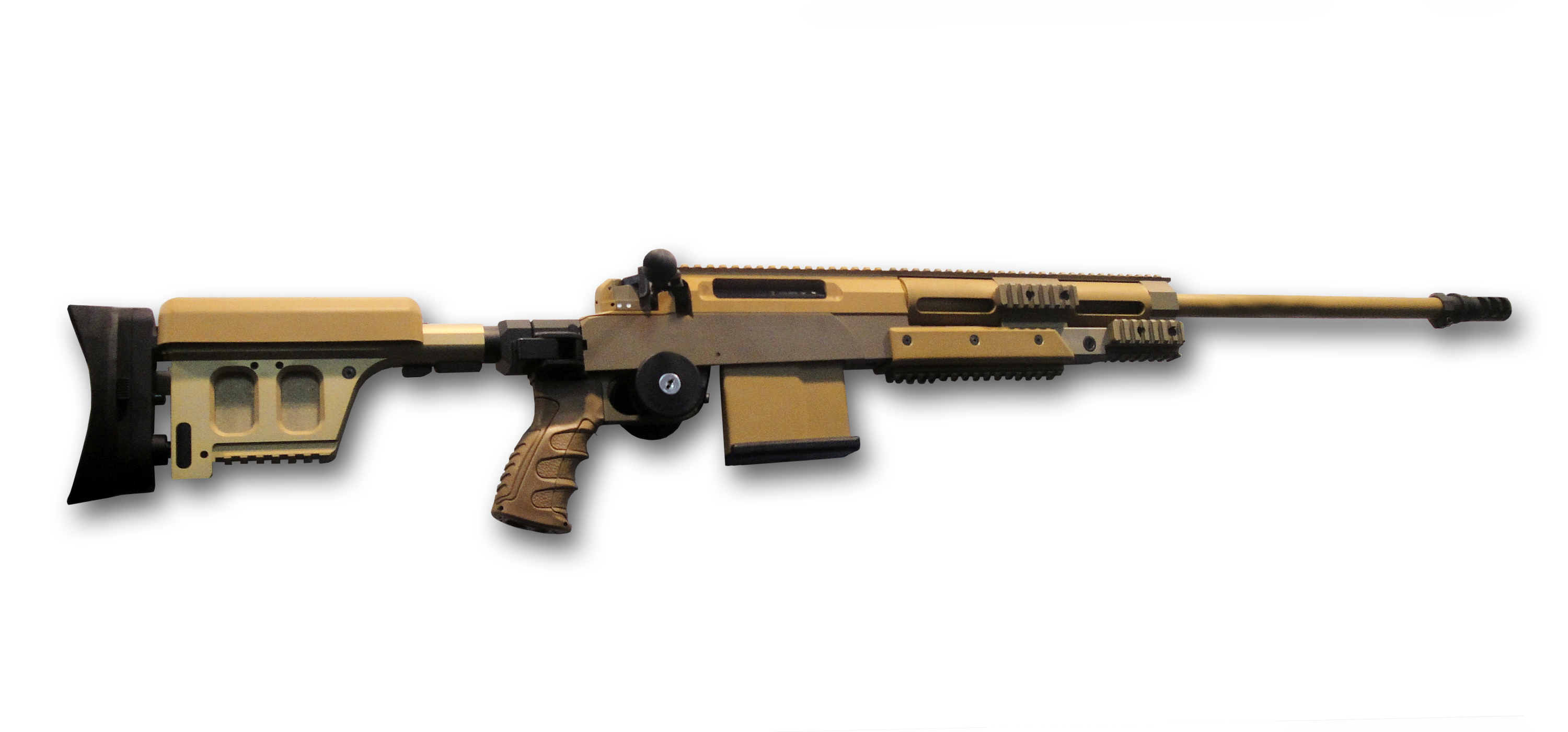
- Type: Sniper rifle
- Place of origin: Germany

Service history
- In service: 2016–present
- Used by: See Users

Production history
- Manufacturer: C.G. Haenel
- Produced: 2016–present

Specifications
- Mass: 7.54 kg (16.6 lb)
- Length: 1,275 mm (4 ft 2.2 in)
- Barrel length: 690 mm (27 in)
- Cartridge: .338 Lapua Magnum
- Muzzle velocity: 1,002 m/s (3,290 ft/s)
- Effective firing range: 1,500 m (1,600 yd)
- Feed system: 10-round detachable box magazine
- Sights: Detachable aperture type iron sights Day or night optics

The Haenel RS9 is a bolt action sniper rifle manufactured by C.G. Haenel. It is the Bundeswehr's medium-range sniper rifle and replaces the Accuracy International AWM in the Kommando Spezialkräfte and Kommando Spezialkräfte Marine.

== History ==
The order for the medium-range sniper rifle was put out to tender by the Bundeswehr in 2014. What was required was a "medium-range sniper weapon, consisting of a rifle, aiming and aiming aids, accessories and ammunition" as a bolt-action rifle for the precise single shot in .338 Lapua Magnum caliber including target optics and accessories.

The service description called for "use in areas with climate categories A1-3, B1-3 and C0-2 according to STANAG 4370 without restriction of functionality" and "adaptability for the night vision attachment (NSV) 80 introduced in the Bundeswehr", a caliber change through replacement barrels was not part of the service description. In addition to Haenel, Unique Alpine was shortlisted with the TPG-3 A4.

Haenel was awarded the contract in February 2016 and is supplying the RS9 model as the G29 rifle. The first lot includes 115 weapons.

== Users ==
- Germany: Kommando Spezialkräfte and Kommando Spezialkräfte Marine (Bundeswehr designation G29).
