= Caracal International =

United Arab Emirates small arms manufacturer

- Type: subsidiary
- Industry: Firearms
- Founded: 2007; 19 years ago
- Headquarters: Abu Dhabi, United Arab Emirates
- Area served: worldwide
- Products: Firearms
- Parent: EDGE Group
- Subsidiaries: Merkel; C.G. Haenel
- Website: Caracal International Caracal USA

Caracal International LLC is an Emirati small arms manufacturer headquartered in Abu Dhabi in the United Arab Emirates. The company designs, produces, tests, and assembles a large variety of small arms for law enforcement organizations and military personnel. It is a subsidiary of EDGE Group.

== History ==
In 2002, Caracal designers and experts working in conjunction with the United Arab Emirates Armed Forces started developing a range of modern pistols and accessories.

By the end of 2006, Caracal International L.L.C. was incorporated and registered as a company in Abu Dhabi. With that, the foundation of a pistol manufacturing industry was established for the first time in the GCC.

Caracal has partnered with India's ICOMM Tele Ltd, a subsidiary of Megha Engineering & Infrastructures Ltd, to supply the Central Reserve Police Force (CRPF) with 200 units of Caracal CS338 sniper rifles, as reported in late September 2025. The rifles would be delivered from Icomm Caracal Small Arms Complex, Hyderabad, which was inaugurated in April 2025. The first rifle would be delivered in the fourth quarter of 2025.

== Products ==
=== Pistols ===
- Caracal pistol
- C320

=== Submachine Guns ===
- CMP 9

=== Assault Rifles ===
- Caracal CAR 814
- Caracal CAR 816
- Caracal CAR 817AR

=== Sniper Rifles ===
- Caracal CS308
- Caracal CS338
- Caracal CAR 817DMR
- Caracal CSR 50

=== Machine Guns ===
- Caracal CLMG 556
