= CSR 50 =

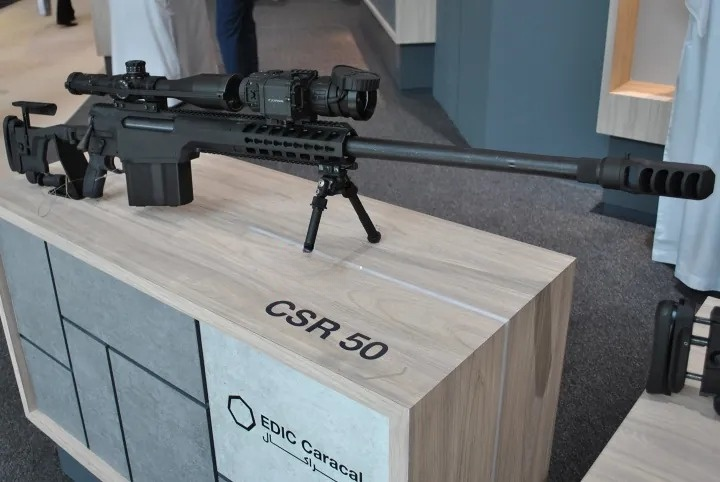
- CSR 50 displayed at idex 2019
- Type: Anti-materiel rifle
- Place of origin: United Arab Emirates

Service history
- In service: 2013-present

Production history
- Designer: Caracal International
- Designed: 2013
- Manufacturer: Caracal International
- Produced: 2013-present

Specifications
- Mass: 20.94 lb. (9.5 kg)
- Length: 1470 mm/1420 mm
- Cartridge: .50 BMG
- Sights: Picatinny rail for mounting optical sights

The CSR 50 is a .50 BMG bolt-action anti-materiel rifle. buil by UAE-based Caracal International. The gun uses a 7075 aluminum receiver and stock. It combines a capacity magazine with 10 rounds Barrett M82/M107A1.The gun weighs 20.94 lb. (9.5 kg) without the magazine. It is built and developed by Caracal International.

== Design ==
The CSR 50 has a fully adjustable buttstock, and its fire controls, safety, and magazine release are ambidextrous. Its Cheekpiece, butt plate and trigger position/weight are configurable by the user.

== Users ==
- United Arab Emirates Seen in UAE, US joint military exercise.
