= Palmer carbine =

Rifle

Palmer Carbine
- Type: Breech-loading rifle
- Place of origin: United States of America

Service history
- In service: 1865
- Used by: United States

Production history
- Manufacturer: E.G. Lamson & Co.
- No. built: 1,000

Specifications
- Length: 37 1/8 inches
- Barrel length: 20 inches
- Cartridge: .56-50 Spencer
- Action: Bolt-Action
- Feed system: Single-shot

The Palmer model 1865 carbine is a single-shot bolt-action rifle patented in 1863 by E. G. Lamson and Company of Shelburne Falls, Massachusetts. 1000 Palmer carbines were delivered to Union forces in the American Civil War one month after the war ended. All rifles (designed to be carbines for cavalry soldiers) were subsequently sold to civilians after the war. The rifle was the first bolt-action rifle to be accepted for use by the US Army Ordnance Department.

Unlike traditional bolt actions, which contain the firing pin centered in the bolt, the Palmer's bolt was machined from a solid block of tubular metal, which had screw type lands and grooves to lock the bolt in place via a short, stubby handle. The hammer of the weapon (located on the right side of the receiver like all other percussion fired rifles of the time period) holds the firing pin at the tip. A tooled, milled slot is visible on the head of the bolt canted toward the right side allows a slight opening for the firing pin atop the hammer to strike the rim-fired cartridge, usually the 56-50 rim fire. The bolt was designed for single-shot action; the cartridges were loaded one at a time. The design was quite revolutionary, and was seen at the time as a simple breech modification to weapons of the time period to accept metallic cartridges instead of the traditional powder, ball, wad, ram rod and percussion cap, which consumed time during loading procedures. The designer understood that gunsmiths could hopefully modify current percussion rifles from the breech of the gun in the same way flintlocks were modified to percussion using a relatively simple process. The downfall of the rifle was the positioning of the hammer where the firing pin hits the rim of the cartridge, and the small space on the bolt where the two parts meet with the bullet rim when the trigger is pulled.

Ultimately the actions of rifles like the Spencer rifle and the Sharps rifle were preferred over the Palmer. Its design is a predecessor of all modern bolt-action-type rifles.

In 1870, France purchased a number of Palmers to be used in the ongoing Franco-Prussian War.
