= Merkel (firearms manufacturer) =

German arms manufacturer

Merkel Jagd- und Sportwaffen GmbH
- Industry: Firearms
- Founded: Suhl, Thuringia, 1898; 128 years ago
- Founder: Albert Oskar Merkel, Karl Paul Merkel, and Gebhard Merkel
- Headquarters: Germany
- Products: Shotguns, rifles
- Revenue: €14.3 Million (2018)
- Number of employees: 123 (2018)
- Parent: Caracal International
- Subsidiaries: C. G. Haenel
- Website: Merkel Jagd- und Sportwaffen GmbH

Merkel Jagd- und Sportwaffen GmbH is a manufacturer of hunting weapons in Suhl, Thuringia. It manufactures bolt-action rifles, double rifles, Drillings, and shotguns. Merkel has been a subsidiary of the UAE company Caracal International, based in Abu Dhabi, since 2007.

== History ==
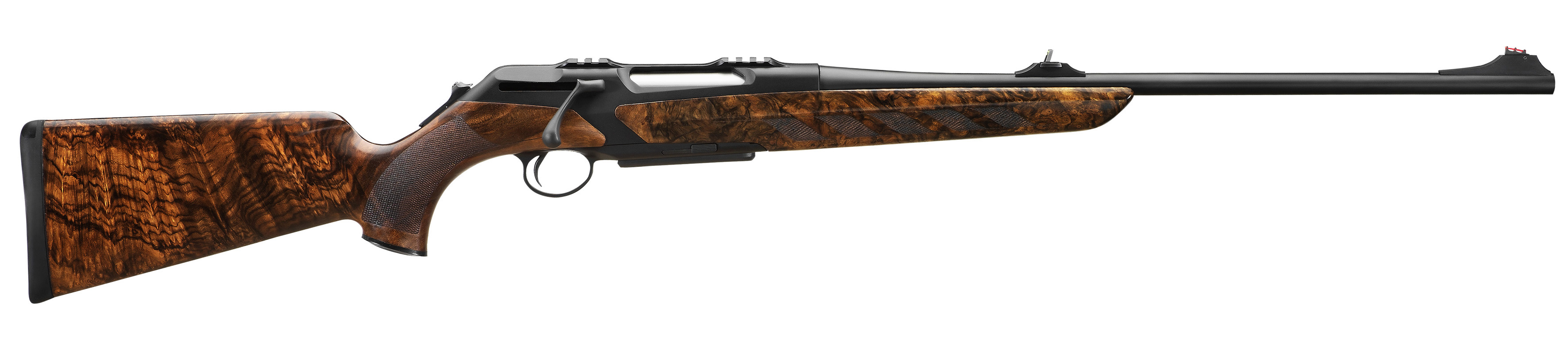
Repeating rifle Merkel RX Helix (2010)

Albert Oskar Merkel, Karl Paul Merkel, and Gebhard Merkel founded the company Gebrüder Merkel Suhl in 1898, then in 1905 the company began manufacturing weapons. Albert Oskar Merkel retired in 1907 from the company.

During World War I hunting weapons production suffered, and many overseas markets were lost. After the war, Merkel rifles were again being exported to 28 countries, although the company did not fully recover from the consequences of the war until 1924. The co-founder Gebhard Merkel died in 1933, and in 1938, Adolf Schade and Ernst Merkel took over the management.

After the outbreak of World War II in 1939, the company began producing carbines and engine and equipment parts. In 1937 Hermann Göring received a Merkel shotgun engraved with game scenes. It is thought that General Franco of Spain commissioned this gun and gifted it to Göring. After the end of the war the gun was captured and presented to then General, Dwight Eisenhower, and it is now on display in the NRA Museum in Fairfax. In 1942 Karl Paul Merkel died, and by 1943 the production of hunting weapons came to a virtual halt.

After the war the production of hunting weapons commenced, and in 1952 the company became owned by the government of the German Democratic Republic (East Germany). After the reunification of Germany in 1990, the company went through modernisation, and in 2007 it was sold to the UAE company Caracal International which is a part of the state's owned EDGE Group.

== Sources ==
- инженер Н. Терехов. Ружья "Меркель" // журнал «Охота и охотничье хозяйство», No. 6, 1978. стр.28-29
