= Bolt action =

Type of firearm mechanism

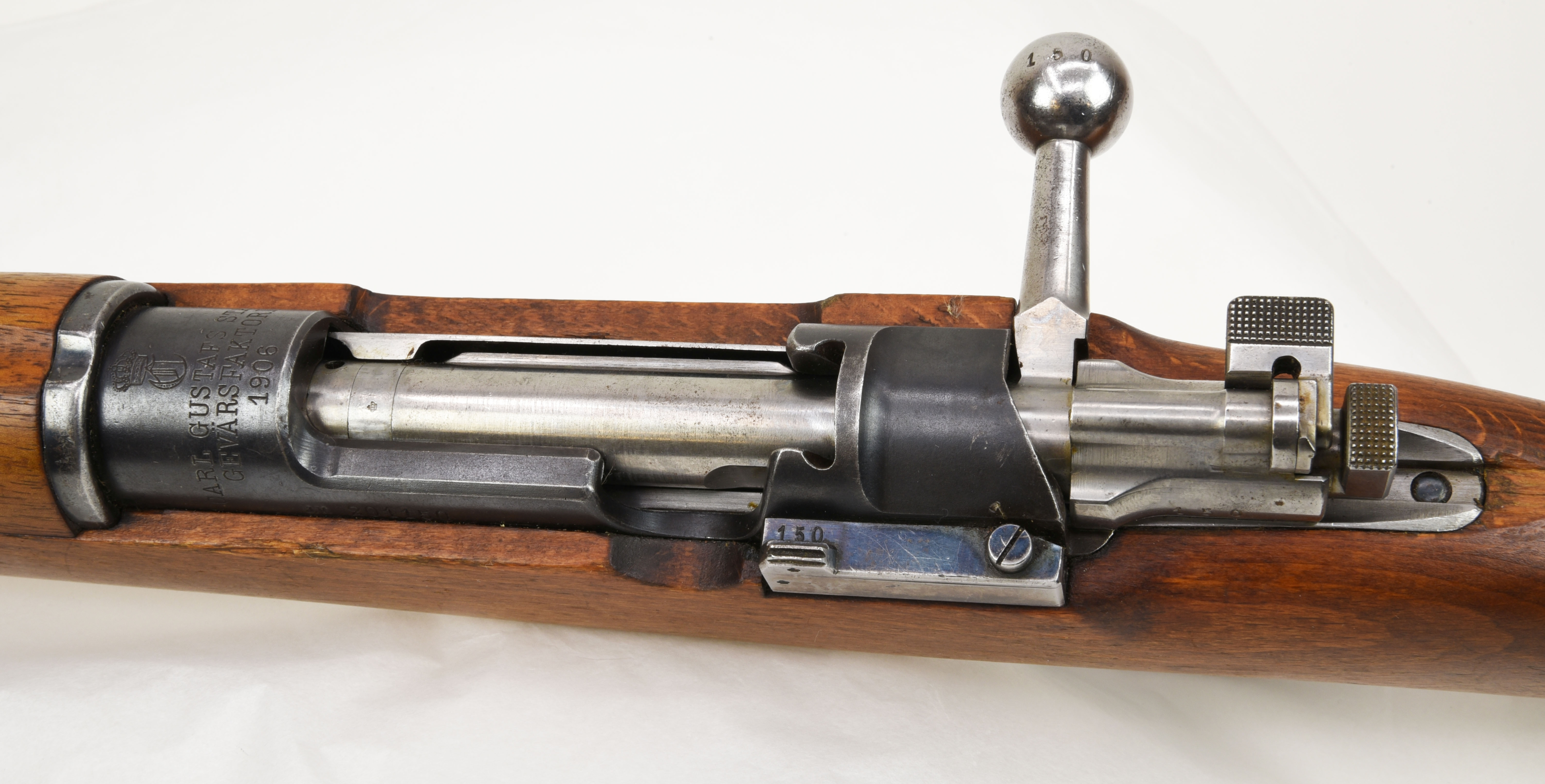
Bolt action rotating bolt in Mauser m/96

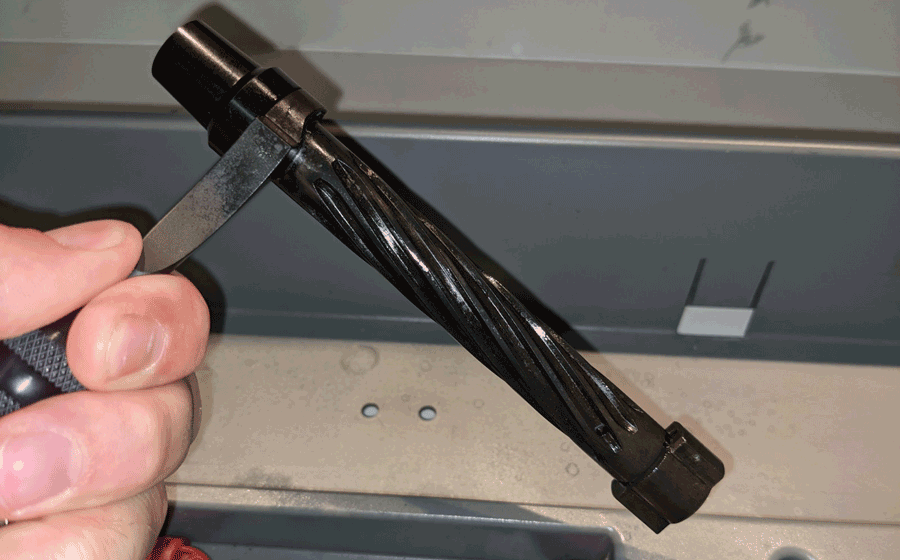
A Kelbly rifle action bolt that has been fluted

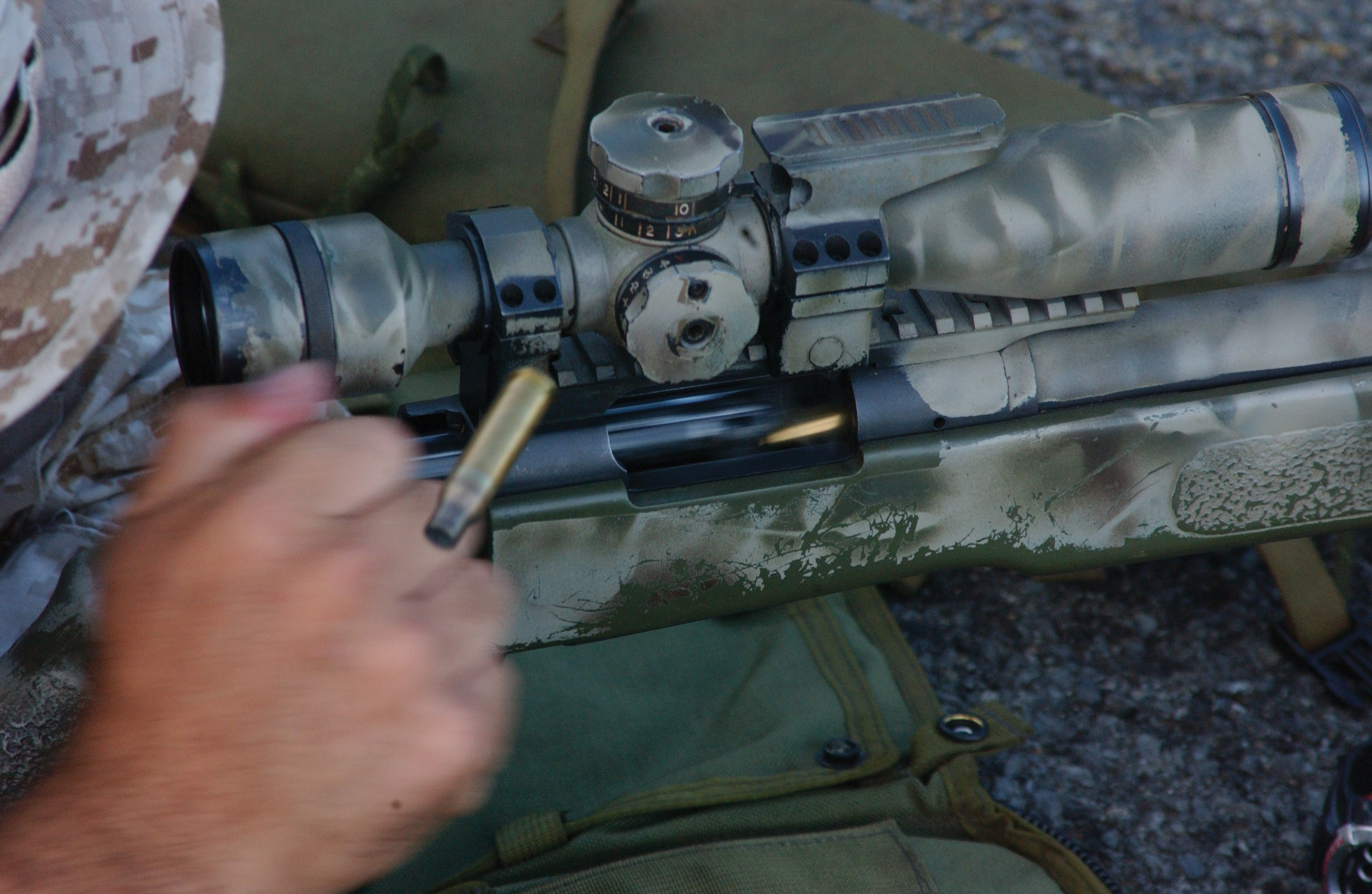
A US Marine extracts a spent round from an M40A3 using a bolt-action mechanism.

Bolt action is a type of manual firearm action that is operated by directly manipulating the turn-bolt via a bolt handle, most commonly placed on the right-hand side of the firearm (as most users are right-handed). The majority of bolt-action firearms are rifles, but there are also some variants of shotguns and handguns that are bolt-action.

Bolt action firearms are generally repeating firearms, but many single-shot designs are available as well, particularly in shooting sports where single-shot firearms are mandated, such as most Olympic and ISSF rifle disciplines.

From the late 19th century all the way through both World Wars, bolt action rifles were the standard infantry service weapons for most of the world's military forces. Except the United States Armed Forces, while they used the bolt-action M1903 Springfield during World War I, by World War II they had adopted the M1 Garand semi-automatic rifle. In modern military and law enforcement after the Second World War, bolt-action firearms have been largely replaced by semi-automatic and selective-fire firearms, and have remained only as sniper rifles due to the design's inherent potential for superior accuracy and precision, as well as ruggedness and reliability compared to self-loading designs.

Due to their higher pressure, most centerfire bolt action firearms use a rotating turn-bolt operation, where the handle must first be rotated upward to unlock the bolt from the receiver – the bolt is locked in the receiver with locking lugs which hold it securely in place during firing – then pulled back to open the breech and allowing any spent cartridge case to be extracted and ejected. This also cocks the striker within the bolt (either on opening or closing of the bolt depending on the gun design) and engages it against the sear. When the bolt is returned to the forward position, a new cartridge (if available) is pushed out of the magazine and into the barrel chamber, and finally the breech is closed tight by rotating the handle down so the bolt head relocks on the receiver. Another bolt-action type is the straight-pull mechanism, where no upward handle-turning is needed and the bolt unlocks automatically when the handle is pulled rearwards by the user's hand. Straight-pull bolts are less common on centerfire rifles because their higher pressures can cause the bolt to unlock during firing. However, straight bolts are a common type of bolt on rimfire rifles like ones chambered in .22 Long Rifle or .22 Magnum since they operate at much lower pressures, and are cheaper to manufacture.

== History ==
The first bolt action rifle was produced in 1824 by Johann Nikolaus von Dreyse, following work on breechloading rifles that dated to the 18th century. Von Dreyse would perfect his Nadelgewehr (Needle Rifle) by 1836, and it was adopted by the Prussian Army in 1841. While it saw limited service in the German Revolutions of 1848, it was not fielded widely until the 1864 victory over Denmark. In 1850, a metallic centerfire bolt-action breechloader was patented by Béatus Beringer. In 1852, another metallic centerfire bolt-action breechloader was patented by Joseph Needham and improved upon in 1862 with another patent. Two different systems for primers –the mechanism to ignite a metallic cartridge's powder charge – were invented in the 1860s as well, the Berdan and the Boxer systems.

The United States purchased 900 Greene rifles (an under hammer, percussion capped, single-shot bolt-action that used paper cartridges and an ogival bore rifling system) in 1857, which saw service at the Battle of Antietam in 1862, during the American Civil War; however, this weapon was ultimately considered too complicated for issue to soldiers and was supplanted by the Springfield Model 1861, a conventional muzzle loading rifle. The Palmer carbine, an early rudimentary bolt-action rifle, was patented in 1863, and by 1865 1,000 had been purchased by the Union Army for use as cavalry weapons, although the war ended about a month before the Army took delivery of the rifles, as such they arrived too late to be used in combat; although the Palmer's bolt was only used to open the chamber, since the gun was fired with a separate side-mounted hammer, it is not considered a true bolt-action mechanism. The first true bolt-action rifle – which has the firing pin, striker, ejector and extractor contained within the bolt – to be used by the United States military was the Ward-Burton Model 1871 rifle, chambered in .50-70 Government. The U.S. Army Ordnance Department purchased 316 of these rifles in 1871 to be tested and evaluated along with several other rifles for possible adoption as an improved breechloading service rifle, although the Army wound up selecting the Springfield Model 1870 trapdoor rifle. The first bolt-action rifle to be adopted as a standard-issue rifle by the United States was the Springfield Model 1892 in 1892. Based on the Norwegian Krag–Jørgensen bolt-action rifle, the Model 1892 was chambered in .30-40 Krag and was the primary infantry rifle used by the United States Army during the Spanish-American War in 1898, the Model 1892 was in service with the Regular Army from 1892–1907, and saw limited use by rear-echelon and U.S. Army Reserve units during World War I.

The French Army adopted its first bolt-action rifle, the Chassepot rifle which used an 11 mm (0.43 in) paper cartridge, in 1866 and followed with the metallic cartridge bolt-action Gras rifle in 1874. European armies continued to develop bolt-action rifles through the latter half of the 19th century, first adopting tubular magazines as on the Kropatschek rifle and the Lebel rifle. The first bolt-action repeating rifle was patented in Britain in 1855 by an unidentified inventor through the patent agent Auguste Edouard Loradoux Bellford using a gravity-operated tubular magazine in the stock. Another more well-known bolt-action repeating rifle was the Vetterli rifle of 1867 and the first bolt-action repeating rifle to use centerfire cartridges was the weapon designed by the Viennese gunsmith Ferdinand Fruwirth in 1871. Ultimately, the military turned to bolt-action rifles using a box magazine; the first of its kind was the M1885 Remington–Lee, but the first to be generally adopted was the British 1888 Lee–Metford. World War I marked the height of the bolt-action rifle's use, with all of the nations in that war fielding troops armed with various bolt-action designs.

During the buildup prior to World War II, the military bolt-action rifle began to be superseded by semi-automatic rifles and later fully automatic rifles, though bolt-action rifles remained the primary weapon of most of the combatants for the duration of the war; and many American units, especially the USMC, used bolt-action M1903 Springfield rifles until sufficient numbers of M1 Garand rifles were made available. The bolt-action is still common today among many sniper rifles, as the design has the potential for superior accuracy, reliability, reduced weight, and the ability to control loading over the faster rate of fire that all semi-automatic rifle alternatives allow. There are, however, many semi-automatic rifle designs used especially in the designated marksman role.

Today, bolt-action rifles are chiefly used as hunting and target rifles. These rifles can be used to hunt anything from vermin to deer and to large game, especially big game caught on a safari, as they are adequate to deliver a single lethal shot from a safe distance. Target shooters favour single-shot bolt actions for their simplicity of design, reliability, and accuracy.

Since the 2020s, bolt-action AR-15 rifles have started becoming more popular in states like California, New York, Massachusetts, Connecticut, Hawaii, Washington, New Jersey, and Illinois, which have passed laws either restricting semi-automatic rifles with certain cosmetic features as "assault weapons", or have outright banned the AR-15 and other semi-automatic rifles with detachable magazines. These types of bolt-action rifles use an AR-15 lower receiver and a special bolt-action upper receiver, with M-LOK accessory rails, they retain the look, feel, and versatility of a traditional AR-15; but since they have no gas system and no semi-automatic function, they do not meet state law definitions of an assault weapon. Bolt-action AR-style rifles, or bolt-action rifles using components like AR-style magazines, are also becoming more popular with competition and sport shooters, since they are compatible with a wide range of accessories they can be easily customized to the user, and do not require special proprietary parts like magazines. Examples of bolt-action rifles using AR-15 magazines include the Ruger American Rifle, and examples of AR-15 style bolt action rifles include the Dark Storm Industries DS-15 Thunderbolt 5.56x45mm and .300 Blackout state-compliant rifle, and the high-end competition and hunting Q The Fix chambered in 5.56x45mm, .300 Blackout, 6mm ARC, 6.5mm Creedmoor, 8.6mm Blackout, and .308 Winchester.

Bolt-action shotguns are considered a rarity among modern firearms but were formerly a commonly used action for .410 entry-level shotguns, as well as for low-cost 12-gauge shotguns. The M26 Modular Accessory Shotgun System (MASS) is the most recent and advanced example of a bolt-action shotgun, albeit one designed to be attached to an M16 rifle or M4 carbine using an underbarrel mount (although with the standalone kit, the MASS can become a standalone weapon). Mossberg 12-gauge bolt-action shotguns were briefly popular in Australia after the 1997 changes to firearms laws, but the shotguns themselves were awkward to operate and had only a three-round magazine, thus offering no practical or real advantages over a conventional double-barreled shotgun.

Some pistols use a bolt-action system, although this is uncommon, and such examples are typically for specialized purposes like the British Welrod that was used by British SOE special forces operatives during World War II. The Welrod was a bolt-action pistol chambered in .32 ACP with an integrally suppressed barrel, which is a barrel with a built-in silencer. Bolt-action pistols like the Savage 110 PCS 6.5mm Creedmoor and the Aero Precision SOLUS 8.6mm Blackout are also popular with competition shooters and hunters; and like bolt-action ARs, some bolt-action pistols are designed for use in states that have banned AR-style pistols.

== Major bolt-action systems ==
=== Rotating bolt ===
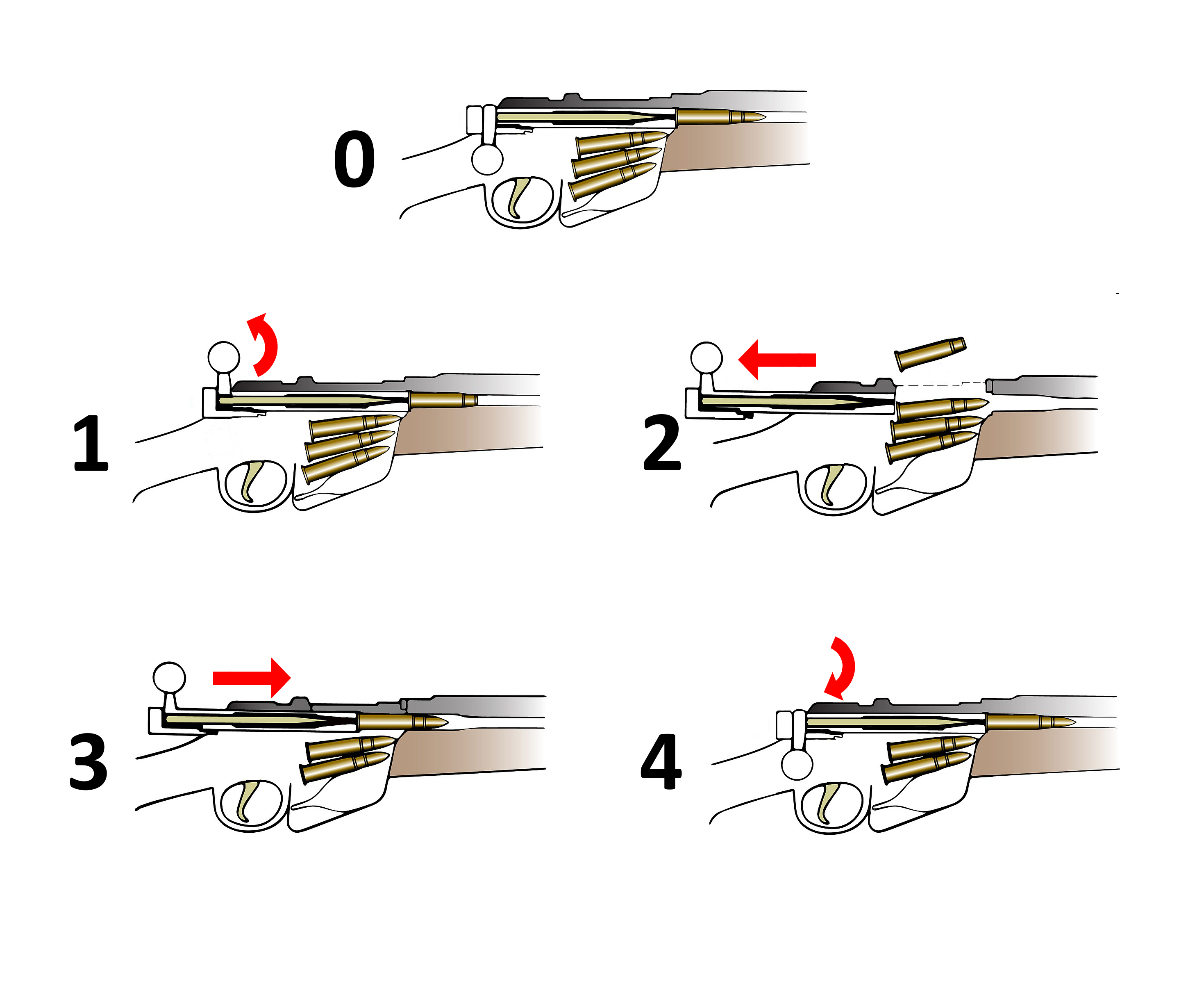
Rotating bolt scheme

Most of the bolt-action designs use a rotating bolt (or "turn pull") design, which involves the shooter doing an upward "rotating" movement of the handle to unlock the bolt from the breech and cock the firing pin, followed by a rearward "pull" to open the breech, extract the spent cartridge case, then reverse the whole process to chamber the next cartridge and relock the breech. There are four major turn bolt-action designs: the Remington M-700, the Mauser system, the Lee–Enfield system, and the Mosin–Nagant system.

All four differ in the way the bolt fits into the receiver, how the bolt rotates as it is being operated, the number of locking lugs holding the bolt in place as the gun is fired, and whether the action is cocked on the opening of the bolt (as in both the Mauser system and the Mosin Nagant system) or the closing of the bolt (as in the Lee–Enfield system). The vast majority of modern bolt-action rifles were made for the commercial market post-war, two of the others use the Mauser system, with other designs such as the Lee–Enfield system and the Mosin Nagant system, of only limited usage.

==== Mauser ====
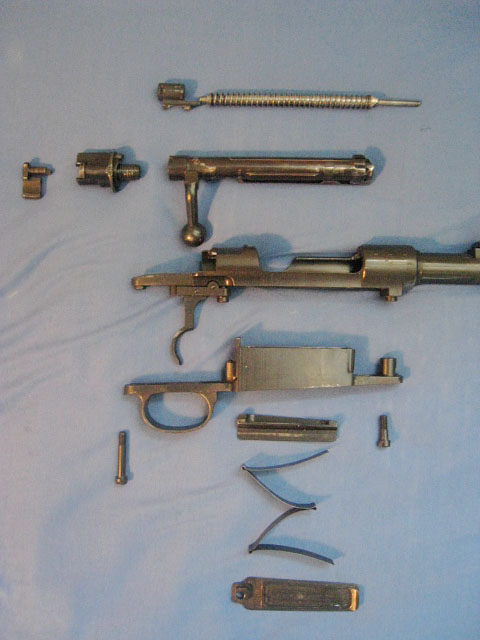
A disassembled Karabiner 98k action

The Mauser bolt-action system is based on 19th-century Mauser bolt-action rifle designs and was finalized in the Gewehr 98 designed by Paul Mauser. It is the most common bolt-action system in the world, being in use in nearly all modern hunting rifles and the majority of military bolt-action rifles until the middle of the 20th century. The Mauser bolt features two strong forward locking lugs, a third rear safety lug, and the iconic Mauser-style Controlled Round Feeding (CRF) system that uses a non-rotating claw extractor (known as the "Mauser claw"), which engages the rim of the cartridge as it leaves the magazine and remains engaged through the entire feeding and ejecting process for better control (as opposed to push feed systems where the bolt doesn't grip the cartridge until the bolt is closed). A novel safety feature (at the time) was the introduction of a third locking lug present at the rear of the bolt, the third lug acts as a failsafe in the event the two forward locking lugs fail, which prevents the bolt from flying back into the shooter's face. The Mauser system features a "cock on opening" mechanism, meaning the upward rotation of the bolt when the rifle is opened cocks the action.

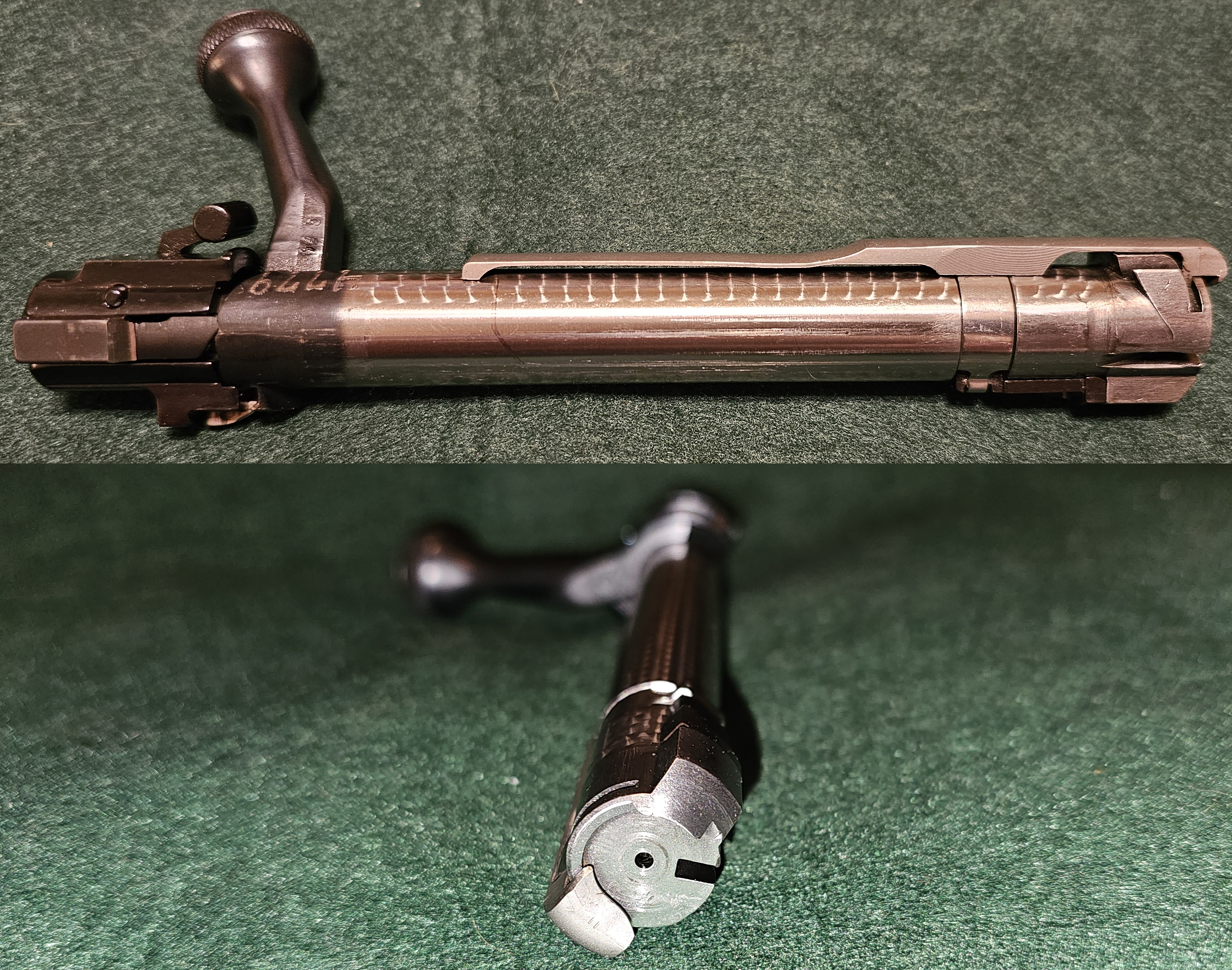
Close-up view of a Winchester Model 70 Classic bolt, a modern example of a bolt-action rifle that uses a Mauser style bolt

A drawback of the Mauser M 98 system is that it cannot be cheaply mass-produced very easily. Many Mauser M 98-inspired derivatives feature technical alterations, such as omitting the third safety locking lug, to simplify production.

The controlled-feed on the Mauser M 98 bolt-action system is simple, strong, safe, and well-thought-out design that has inspired other military and sporting rifle designs that became available during the 20th century, including the:

- Gewehr 98/Standardmodell/Karabiner 98k
- M24 series
- vz. 24/vz. 33
- Type 24 rifle
- M1903 Springfield
- Pattern 1914 Enfield
- M1917 Enfield
- Arisaka Type 38/Type 99
- M48 Mauser
- Kb wz. 98a/Karabinek wz. 1929
- FR 7/FR 8
- Modern hunting/sporting rifles like the CZ 550, Heym Express Magnum, Ruger M77, and Winchester Model 70
- Modern sniper rifles like the Sako TRG, Accuracy International Arctic Warfare and GOL Sniper Magnum

Versions of the Mauser action designed prior to the Gewehr 98's introduction, such as that of the Swedish Mauser rifles and carbines, lack the third locking lug and feature a "cock on closing" operation.

==== Lee–Enfield ====
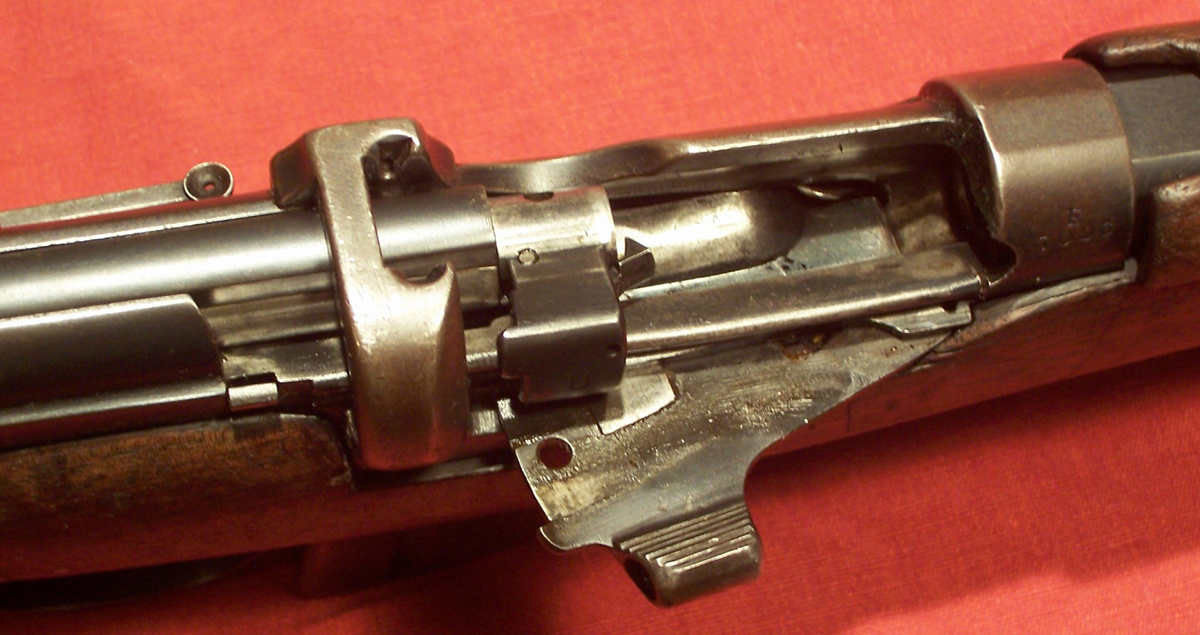
Close-up of the action on an SMLE Mk III rifle, showing the bolt head, magazine cut off, and charger clip guide

The Lee–Enfield bolt-action system was introduced in 1889 with the Lee–Metford and later Lee–Enfield rifles (the bolt system is named after the designer James Paris Lee and the barrel rifling after the Royal Small Arms Factory in the London Borough of Enfield), and is a "cock on closing" action in which the forward thrust of the bolt cocks the action. This enables a shooter to keep eyes on sights and targets uninterrupted when cycling the bolt. The ability of the bolt to flex between the lugs and chamber, which also keeps the shooter safer in case of a catastrophic chamber overpressure failure.

The disadvantage of the rearward-located bolt lugs is that a larger part of the receiver, between chamber and lugs, must be made stronger and heavier to resist stretching forces. Also, the bolt ahead of the lugs may flex on firing which, although a safety advantage with repeated firing over time, this may lead to a stretched receiver and excessive headspacing, which if perceived as a problem can be remedied by changing the removable bolt head to a larger sized one (the Lee–Enfield bolt manufacture involved a mass production method where at final assembly the bolt body was fitted with one of three standard size bolt heads for correct headspace). In the years leading up to World War II, the Lee–Enfield bolt system was used in numerous commercial sporting and hunting rifles manufactured by such firms in the United Kingdom as BSA, LSA, and Parker–Hale, as well as by SAF Lithgow in Australia. Vast numbers of ex-military SMLE Mk III rifles were sporterised post WWII to create cheap, effective hunting rifles, and the Lee–Enfield bolt system is used in the M10 and No 4 Mk IV rifles manufactured by Australian International Arms. Rifle Factory Ishapore of India manufactures a hunting and sporting rifle chambered in .315 which also employs the Lee Enfield action.

- Lee–Enfield (all marks and models)
- Ishapore 2A1
- Various hunting/sporting rifles manufactured by BSA, LSA, SAF Lithgow, and Parker Hale
- Australian International Arms M10 and No 4 Mk IV hunting/sporting rifles
- Rifle Factory Ishapore's hunting Lee Enfield rifle in .315

==== Mosin–Nagant ====
The Mosin–Nagant action, created in 1891 and named after the designers Sergei Mosin and Léon Nagant, differs significantly from the Mauser and Lee–Enfield bolt-action designs. The Mosin–Nagant design has a separate bolt head that rotates with the bolt and the bearing lugs, in contrast to the Mauser system where the bolt head is a non-removable part of the bolt. The Mosin–Nagant is also unlike the Lee–Enfield system where the bolt head remains stationary and the bolt body itself rotates. The Mosin–Nagant bolt is a somewhat complicated affair, but is extremely rugged and durable; like the Mauser, it uses a "cock on open" system. Although this bolt system has been rarely used in commercial sporting rifles (the Vostok brand target rifles being the most recognized) and has never been exported outside of Russia, large numbers of military surplus Mosin–Nagant rifles have been sporterized for use as hunting rifles in the following years since the end of World War II.

==== Swing ====
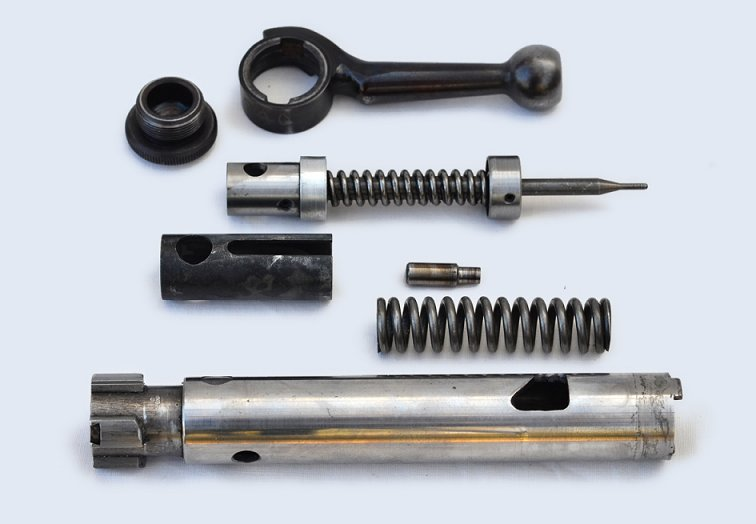
Swing Mk4 Bolt disassembled

The Swing was developed in 1970 in the United Kingdom as a purpose-built target rifle for use in NRA competition. Fullbore target rifle competitions historically used accurised examples of the prevailing service rifle, but it was felt these had reached the end of their development potential.

The Swing bolt featured four lugs on the bolt head, at 45 degrees when closed - splitting the difference between the vertically locking Mauser and horizontally locking Enfield bolt designs. Supplied with Schultz & Larsen barrels and a trigger derived from the Finnish Mantari, the Swing was commercially successful, with the basic design reused in the Paramount, RPA Quadlock and Millenium rifles.

- Swing rifle
- RPA Rangemaster
- RPA C12A1

==== Other designs ====
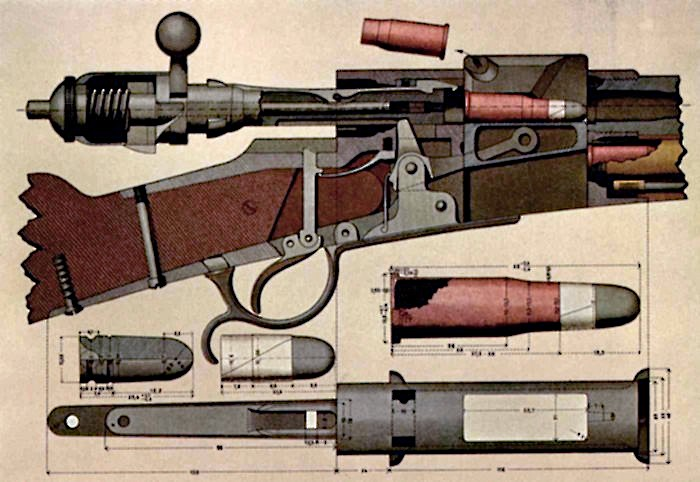
Cutaway diagram of the Vetterli rifle's action

The Vetterli rifle was the first bolt-action repeating rifle introduced by an army. It was used by the Swiss army from 1869 to circa 1890. Modified Vetterlis were also used by the Italian Army.

Another notable design is the Norwegian Krag–Jørgensen, which was used by Norway, Denmark, and briefly the United States. It is unusual among bolt-action rifles in that is loaded through a gate on the right side of the receiver, and thus can be reloaded without opening the bolt. The Norwegian and Danish versions of the Krag have two locking lugs, while the American version has only one. In all versions, the bolt handle itself serves as an emergency locking lug. The Krag's major disadvantage compared to other military-style bolt-action designs is that it is usually loaded by hand, one round at a time, although a box-like device was made that could drop five rounds into the magazine. This made it slower to reload than other designs which used stripper or en bloc clips. Another historically important bolt-action system was the Gras system, used on the French Mle 1874 Gras rifle, Mle 1886 Lebel rifle (which was the first to introduce ammunition loaded with nitrocellulose-based smokeless powder), and the Berthier series of rifles.

=== Straight pull ===
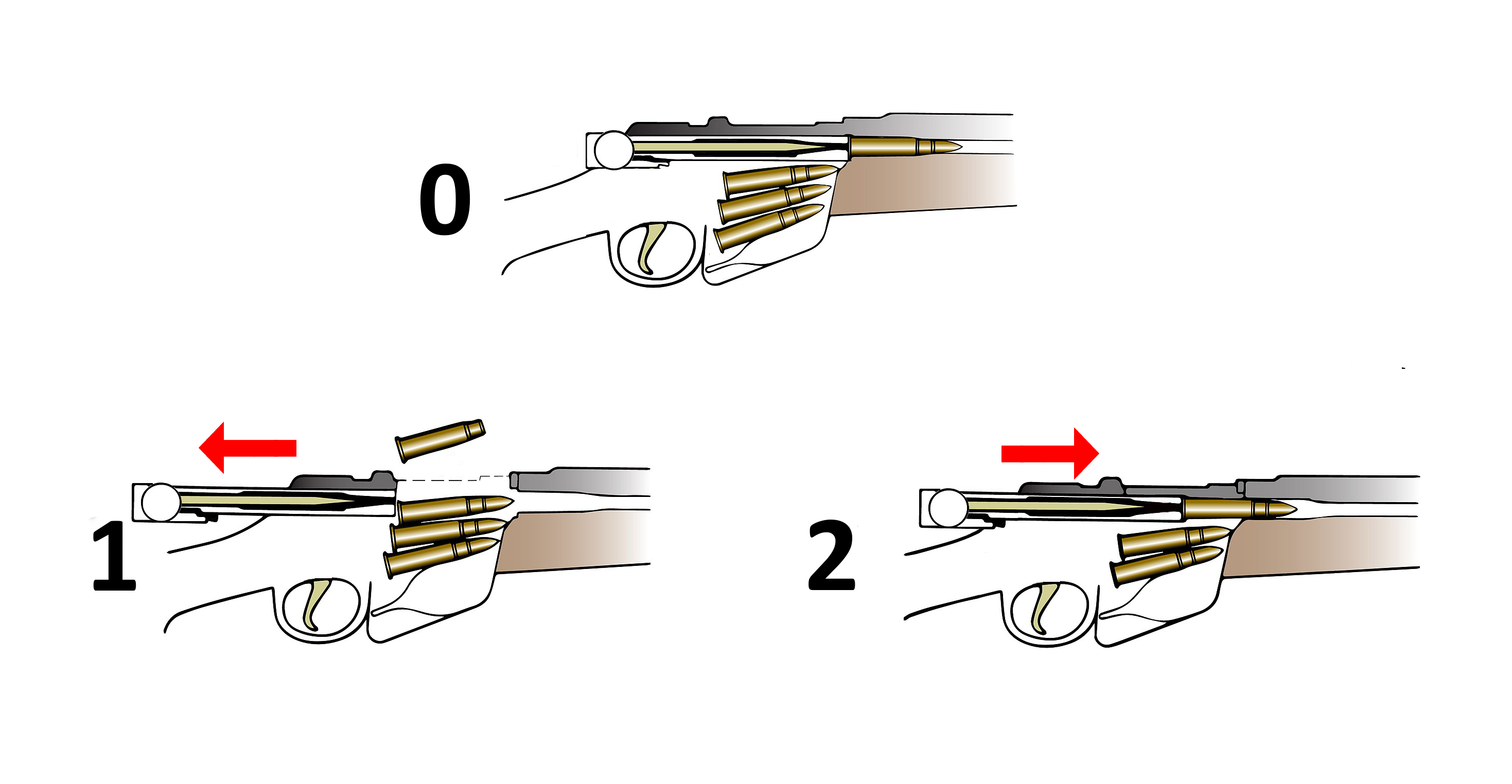
Straight-pull bolt scheme

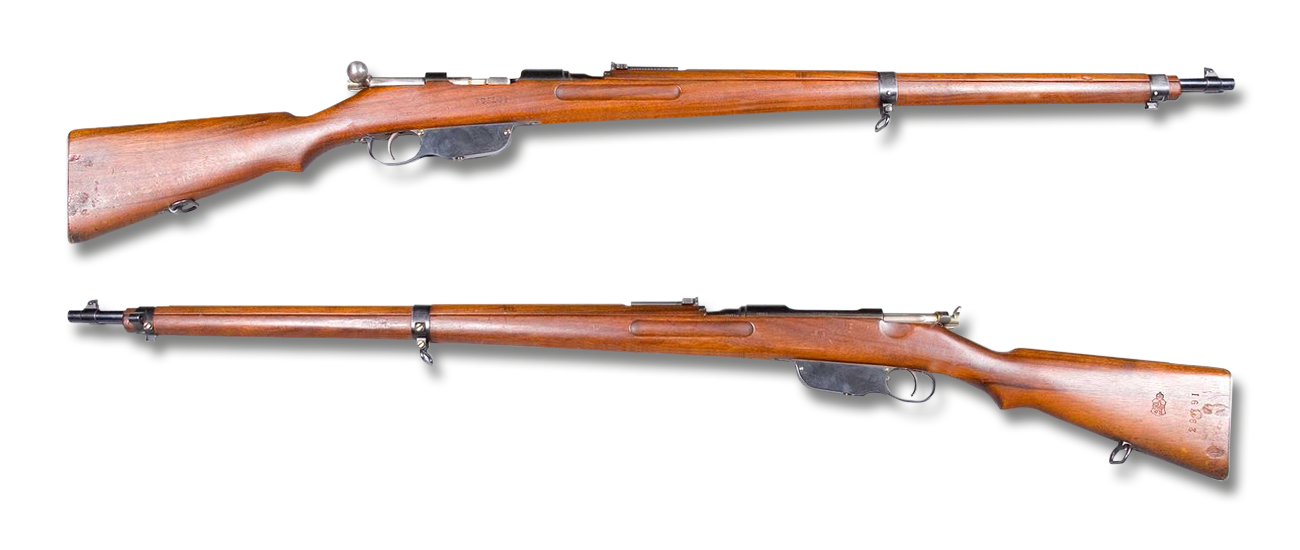
Mannlicher M95

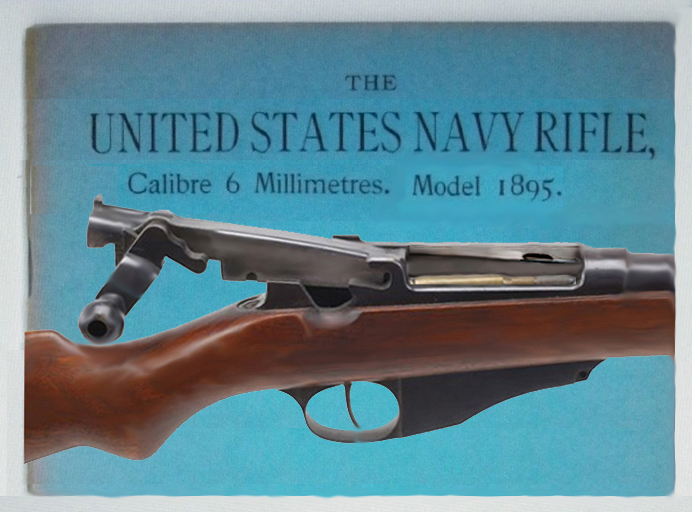
Lee Navy Model 1895

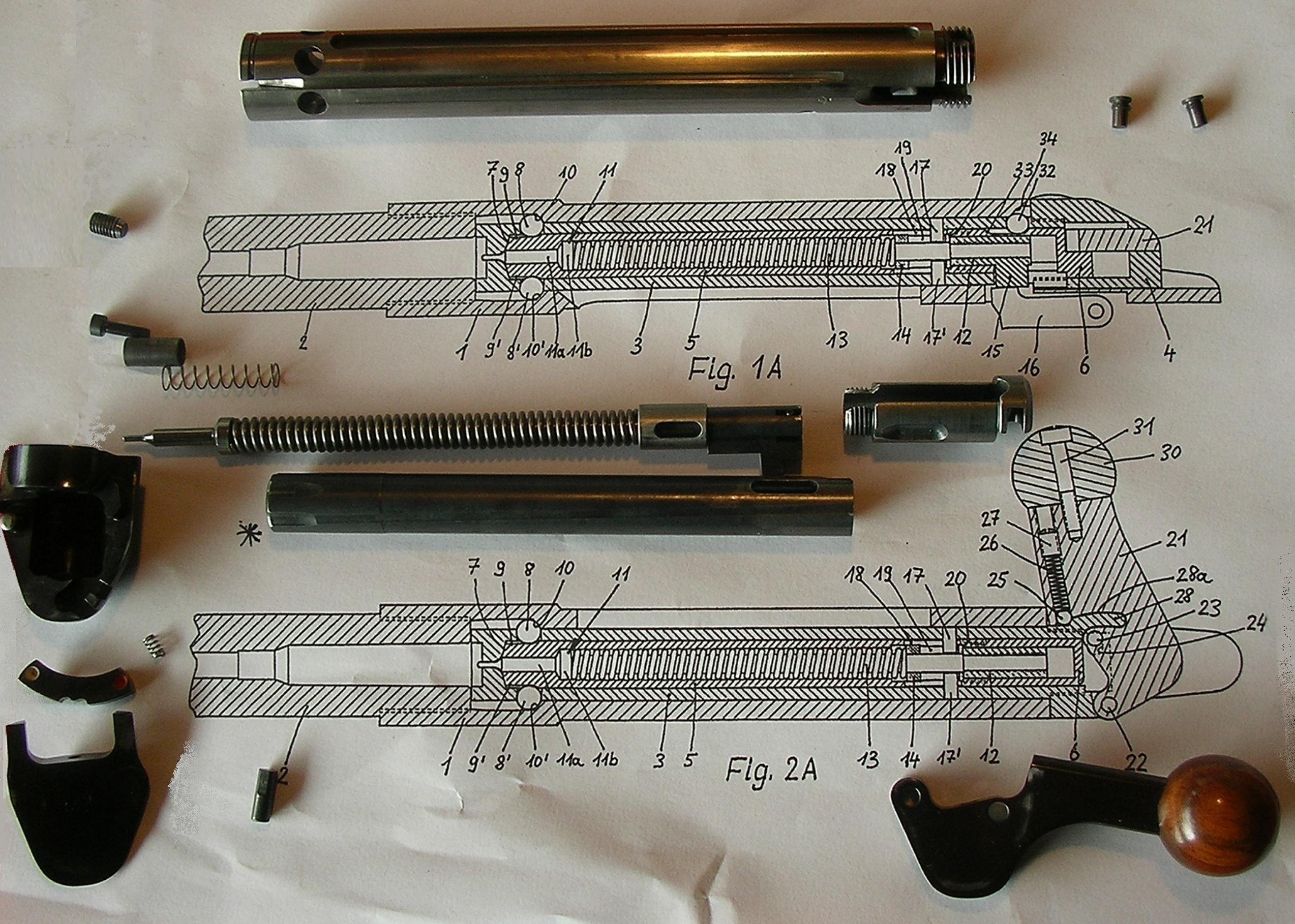
Heym SR 30 (1998), straight pull action. Lock up is achieved by 6 ball bearings around the circumference of the bolt head. This mechanism was originally developed for biathlon rifles.

Straight-pull bolt-actions differ from conventional turn-pull bolt-action mechanisms in that the bolt does not need to be manually rotated to lock/unlock, so the action can be cycled with only a linear back-and-forth motion, as opposed to a traditional bolt-action, where the user has to manually rotate the bolt around the longitudinal axis in addition to the linear motions to perform chambering and primary extraction. The bolt locking mechanism of a straight pull action is achieved via different designs, usually one that resembles the rotating bolt head of a self-loading rifle. Straight-pull firearms typically have a faster rate of fire than conventional bolt-action guns, as the entire operating cycle needs the shooter to perform only two hand movements (pull back and push forward) instead of four (rotate up, pull back, push forward, and rotate down), which also doesn't interfere with the aim when shooting off the shoulder because there are no rotational movements that can impart canting on the gun.

In 1993, the German Blaser company introduced the Blaser R93, a new straight pull action where locking is achieved by a series of concentric "claws" that protrude/retract from the bolthead, a design that is referred to as Radialbundverschluss ("radial connection"). As of 2017 the Rifle Shooter magazine listed its successor Blaser R8 as one of the three most popular straight pull rifles together with Merkel Helix and Browning Maral. Some other notable modern straight pull rifles are made by Beretta, C.G. Haenel, Chapuis, Heym, Lynx, Rößler, Savage Arms, Strasser, and Steel Action.

Most straight bolt rifles have a firing mechanism without a hammer (same as most bolt-action guns), but there are some hammer-fired models, such as the Merkel Helix. Firearms using a hammer usually have a comparably longer lock time than hammerless mechanisms.

In the sport of biathlon, because shooting speed is an important performance factor and semi-automatic guns are illegal for race use, straight pull actions are quite common and are used almost exclusively in the Biathlon World Cup. The first company to make the straight pull action for .22 caliber was J. G. Anschütz; Peter Fortner junior designed the "Fortner Action", which was incorporated into the Anschütz 1827 Fortner. The Fortner action is specifically the straight-pull ball bearing lock action, which features spring-loaded ball bearings on the side of the bolt which lock into a groove inside the bolt's housing. With the new design came a new dry fire method; instead of the bolt being turned up slightly, the action is locked back to catch the firing pin. The action was later used in the centre-fire Heym SR 30.

== Operating the bolt ==
Typically, the bolt consists of a tube of metal inside of which the firing mechanism is housed, and which has at the front or rear of the tube several metal knobs, or "lugs", which serve to lock the bolt in place. The operation can be done via a rotating bolt, a lever, cam action, a locking piece, or a number of systems. Straight pull designs have seen a great deal of use, though manual turn bolt designs are what is most commonly thought of in reference to a bolt-action design due to the type ubiquity. As a result, the bolt-action term is often reserved for more modern types of rotating bolt designs when talking about a specific weapon's type of action.

However, both straight pull and rotating bolt rifles are types of bolt-action rifles. Lever-action and pump-action weapons must still operate the bolt, but they are usually grouped separately from bolt-actions that are operated by a handle directly attached to a rotating bolt. Early bolt-action designs, such as the Dreyse needle gun and the Mauser Model 1871, locked by dropping the bolt handle or bolt guide rib into a notch in the receiver, this method is still used in .22 rimfire rifles. The most common locking method is a rotating bolt with two lugs on the bolt head, which was used by the Lebel Model 1886 rifle, Model 1888 Commission Rifle, Mauser M 98, Mosin–Nagant and most bolt-action rifles. The Lee–Enfield has a lug and guide rib, which lock on the rear end of the bolt into the receiver.

=== Bolt knob ===
The bolt knob is the part of the bolt handle that the user grips when loading and reloading the firearm and thereby acts as a cocking handle. On many older firearms, the bolt knob is welded to the bolt handle, and as such becoming an integral part of the bolt handle itself. On many newer firearms, the bolt knob is instead threaded onto the handle, allowing the user to change the original bolt knob for an aftermarket one, either for aesthetical reasons, achieving better grip or similar. The type of threads used vary between firearms. European firearms often use either M6 1 or M8 1.25 threads, for example M6 is used on the SIG Sauer 200 STR, Blaser R93, Blaser R8, CZ 457 and Bergara rifles, while M8 is used on the Sako TRG and SIG Sauer 404. Many American firearms instead use 1/4" 28 TPI (6.35 0.907 mm) or 5/16" 24 TPI (7.9375 1.058 mm) threads. Some other thread types are also used, for example, No. 10 32 TPI (4.826 0.794 mm) as used by Mausingfield. There also exists aftermarket slip-on bolt handle covers which are mounted without having to remove the existing bolt handle. These are often made of either rubber or plastic.

== Reloading ==
Most bolt-action firearms are fed by an internal magazine loaded by hand, by en bloc, or by stripper clips, though a number of designs have had a detachable magazine or independent magazine, or even no magazine at all, thus requiring that each round be independently loaded. Generally, the magazine capacity is limited to between two and ten rounds, as it can permit the magazine to be flush with the bottom of the rifle, reduce the weight, or prevent mud and dirt from entering. A number of bolt-actions have a tube magazine, such as along the length of the barrel. In weapons other than large rifles, such as pistols and cannons, there were some manually operated breech-loading weapons. However, the Dreyse Needle fire rifle was the first breech loader to use a rotating bolt design. Johann Nicholas von Dreyse's rifle of 1838 was accepted into service by Prussia in 1841, which was in turn developed into the Prussian Model in 1849. The design was a single shot breech-loader and had the now familiar arm sticking out from the side of the bolt, to turn and open the chamber. The entire reloading sequence was a more complex procedure than later designs, however, as the firing pin had to be independently primed and activated, and the lever was used only to move the bolt.

== See also ==
- Antique firearms – Firearms older than 20th century
- British military rifles – Rifles used by the British Armed Forces
- List of bolt action rifles

=== Other firearm actions ===
- Break action – Type of firearm action
- Falling-block action – Single-shot firearm action
- Rolling block – Single-shot firearm action
