= Heym (gun manufacturer) =

German firearms manufacturer

- Company type: Firearms manufacturer
- Industry: Firearms
- Founded: 1865; 161 years ago
- Headquarters: Römhild, Hildburghausen, Thuringia, Germany
- Website: heym-fabrik.de

Heym AG is a German gun manufacturer established in 1865. Heym manufacture shotguns, bolt-action rifles and double rifles.

== Company history ==
Heym was founded in Suhl, Germany by Friedrich Wilhelm Heym in July 1865. On May 24, 1891, they were issued Patent Nr. 60215 for a three barreled hunting rifle with three triggers and three hammers on the same axis. This was the birth of the first hammerless drilling. The company expanded producing drillings, shotguns, and over and under rifle-shotgun combinations. Russia was their most important export market until 1914.

In 1912, Adolf Heym assumed management of the company and began shifting the export market from Russia to the USA. August Heym assumed management of the company in 1920, and began production of Anson & Deeley Drillings, double rifle drillings, drillings with three triggers, double rifles, and rifle shotgun combination guns.

Following World War II in 1945, Heym made a new start in the West Germany. The factory moved to Ostheim in the Rhön/ Lower Franconia. August and Rolf Heym oversaw the establishment of a new factory. Heym products during this time consisted of cuckoo clocks, slide rules, spinning wheels, among various other products.

Heym built a new factory in Münnerstadt/ Lower Franconia, Germany in 1952 and transferred manufacturing to this site. Their first cold hammer forging machine “Aklett” was purchased in 1960. Rolf Heym took over management of the company in 1963 until his death in 1972. At that time Elisabeth Heym assumed management of the company and began acquisition of new foreign markets.

In 1988, Oskar W. Zurflüh of Zurich assumed management of the company. The company was transferred to Jürgen Nierich, Munich, HEYM Jagdwaffenfabrik GmbH & Co. KG in 1992. They built a modern weapons factory in Gleichamberg / Thuringia, Germany in 1995 and transferred production from Münnerstadt.

On February 1, 1998, Thomas Wolkmann of Erfurt re-established the company as HEYM Waffenfabrik GmbH (Limited), with a strong emphasis on foreign markets especially Eastern Europe and North America. The company went public in October 2002. The name was changed in February 2007 to Heym AG.

== Products ==
- Safety rifle/shotgun Mod. 22F
- Repeating rifle, Mod. SR 10
- Repeating rifle, Mod. SR 40 short action
- Mod. Mauser 3000
- Repeating rifle SR 20
- Repeating rifle SR 21
- Repeating rifle SR 30 (straight-pull bolt action)
- Repeating rifle Safari Express
- Over and under rifle Mod. 55
- Side lock drilling Mod. 37
- Block action rifle (HEYM/RUGER) HR 30 / 38
- Double rifle(s), Mod. 80 / 88
- Over Under Double Rifle Model 26
- Military training aids
- Flare pistols
- Air pistols 4.5 mm
- Air rifle “HEYM Junior” 4.5 mm
- Air rifle “HEYM”
- Zollkarabiner ZK52 (1952 for the west german custom, based on Mauser 98 system)
- Polizeikarabiner PK52 (1952 for the west german police, based on Mauser 98 system)

New products since 1995:

- HEYM Straight pull repeating rifle Mod. SR 30 Special Editions
- Introduction of the HEYM repeating rifle Mod. SR 21
- HEYM side lock rifle drilling Mod. 37 BK
- HEYM side lock vierling Mod. 37 V
- Heym Safari Express Light (based o Mauser 98 system)
- HEYM side lock double rifle Mod. 88 B/SS Jumbo
- HEYM Grand Royal - custom made rifle

== Awards ==
- 1887 Silver Medal Königsberg
- 1893 Bronze Medal Erfurt
- 1897 Silver State Medal Erfurt
- 1895 Gold Medal Dresden
- 1897 Bronze Medal Leipzig
- 1914 Silver State Medal Warsaw, Poland
- 1914 Gold Medal Kiev, Russia
- 1924 Gold Medal Frankfurt
