= Valon =

Valon is an Albanian male given name meaning "wave" (Albanian:Valë) or more particularly "waving" as an adjective.

== People ==
- Valon Ahmedi (born 1994), Albanian football player
- Valon Behrami (born 1985), Swiss football player
- Valon Berisha (born 1993), Norwegian football player
- Valon Ethemi (born 1997), Macedonian footballer
- Valon Fazliu (born 1996), Swiss footballer
- Valon Saracini (born 1981), the Minister of Economy of Macedonia
- Valon Xhukolli, housemate on the Albanian Big Brother television series
- Valon Zumberi (born 2002), Kosovan footballer

== Places ==
- Occitan for Gard, a department in southern France in the Languedoc-Roussillon region

== Fictional characters ==
- Valon (Yu-Gi-Oh! character), character in the anime and manga series, Yu-Gi-Oh!

== See also ==
- Vallon (disambiguation)
