= VALLON GmbH =

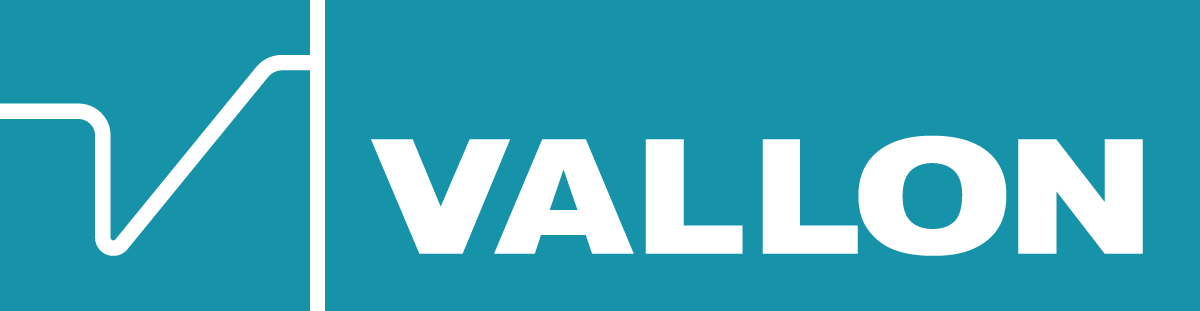
- Type: Private (family-owned)
- Industry: Detection technology, Demining, Industrial demagnetization
- Founded: 1965
- Founder: Richard Vallon
- Headquarters: Arbachtalstraße 10, Eningen unter Achalm, Germany
- Key people: Markus Vallon (Managing Director)
- Products: Metal detectors, dual-sensor detectors, magnetometer systems, demagnetization solutions, personal protective equipment
- Revenue: USD 16.6 million (2025)
- Number of employees: 100
- Website: www.vallon.de

VALLON GmbH is a German manufacturer of metal detectors, magnetometer systems, and demagnetization equipment headquartered in Eningen unter Achalm, Baden-Württemberg. Founded in 1965 by Richard Vallon, the family-owned company specializes in explosive ordnance detection systems for humanitarian demining and military applications, as well as industrial demagnetization solutions.

VALLON's detection products are used by military forces, humanitarian organizations, and civilian explosive ordnance disposal services worldwide.

== History ==
=== Foundation and early years (1965–1979) ===
VALLON was founded in 1965 by Richard Vallon in Eningen, Germany, initially operating as Elektromagnetische Werkstätten (Electromagnetic Workshop, EMW). The company's first operations took place in the basement of the Vallon family home, where Richard Vallon and his son Gerhard converted obsolete detectors made by third-party manufacturers. Shortly after its founding, the company relocated to Reutlingen.

In 1970, the company developed its first in-house product, the EL 1300 iron detector for locating weapons and unexploded ordnance on land. The company name was changed to Richard Vallon EWS during this period.

In 1971, VALLON introduced the EW 1500, designed for underwater and borehole applications. Enhanced versions, the EW 1501 and EW 1502, featured the capability to output graphical measurement curves using a thermal recorder.

In 1973, VALLON launched the MB 1601, the company's first hand-held metal detector for protecting machinery in the lumber and forest management industries. The same year, VALLON began producing degaussing coils, establishing a new business line with products such as the EM06 and EM12, manufactured as modular systems.

In 1976, VALLON introduced the MH 1602, its first compact metal detector designed for personnel scanning. Gerhard Vallon assumed management of the company the same year.

In 1979, the company, now operating as Vallon Industrieelektronik GmbH, expanded its capacity by relocating to Eningen.

=== Technological development (1989–2005) ===
In 1989, VALLON developed multi-channel magnetometer systems enabling single-operator detection of unexploded ordnance (UXO) over large areas, a capability important for construction projects requiring documentation of UXO absence before development.

The company entered a new technological phase in 1990 with the introduction of pulse induction technology, which enabled metal detectors to identify metal type and object size even in highly mineralized soils.

In 1999, VALLON developed the VMH1, a metal detector with adjustable telescoping rod designed for humanitarian aid organizations.

In 2005, VALLON introduced dual-sensor detector technology, combining a metal detector with ground-penetrating radar. This innovation enabled detection of both metal-containing conventional landmines and metal-free improvised explosive devices (IEDs).

=== Recent developments (2012–present) ===
In 2012, VALLON constructed a new production and administration building covering 9,000 m² in Eningen.

In 2017, the company began production of the VXVT trailer for surveying large areas. In 2019, VALLON introduced new software including the EVA4mobile Android app and PC-based EVA4ALL.

In 2021, Markus Vallon, representing the third generation of the Vallon family, assumed management of the company. In 2022, VALLON expanded its magnetometer modular system with the VSM4 probe, a high-precision measuring instrument.

VALLON maintains international technical exchange through its biennial workshop on explosive ordnance detection, which drew over 120 participants from 19 countries in 2023; the 13th workshop is scheduled for September 2026 in Eningen, Germany.

== Products and services ==
=== Explosive ordnance detection ===
VALLON develops and manufactures detection systems for explosive ordnance clearance and geological applications. The company produces a range of metal detectors, including fourth-generation devices such as the VMF4, VMC4, and VMH4, which are used for detecting landmines, improvised explosive devices, and other metal-containing objects. The VMC1 model is known as "Gizmo" among US military personnel.

The company also develops dual-sensor detectors, including the VMR3G Minehound, which combines metal detection with ground-penetrating radar to identify both metal-containing and metal-free objects.

VALLON provides systems for unexploded ordnance detection. The VMX10 is an active metal detector optimized for UXO detection in highly mineralized soils, where traditional magnetometer systems have limitations. For magnetometer-based detection, VALLON offers the VX1 for surface and borehole applications and the VXB3.1, optimized for borehole use. Newer devices, including the VS-3X digital three-axis probe and the VXB-3X three-axis magnetometer set, expand VALLON's capabilities for comprehensive UXO surveying.

In addition to handheld devices, VALLON develops detection technology intended for integration into carrier platforms, including vehicle-mounted applications, drone-based systems, and other specialized deployments. VALLON detection systems are employed in humanitarian demining, military explosive ordnance disposal, civilian clearance operations, archaeological surveying, and geological surveys.

=== Military use and "Vallon Man" ===
VALLON mine detectors were used by the British Army during operations in Afghanistan (Operation Herrick). The term "Vallon Man" was used to describe the soldier in a patrol responsible for carrying and operating the mine detector. The term has been linked to the widespread use of the VALLON VMR3, a dual-sensor detector incorporating ground-penetrating radar (GPR).

VALLON detectors have also been included in museum collections, including the National Army Museum in London, which describes their deployment in Iraq and Afghanistan and notes the use of Digital Magnetic Pulse Induction (DMPI) technology.

The United Kingdom has supplied more than 1 000 VALLON metal detectors and 100 bomb de-arming kits to Ukraine as part of military aid aimed at supporting demining operations in areas affected by the 2022 Russian invasion. The equipment is intended to assist in clearing minefields, civilian infrastructure, and other explosive hazards in reclaimed territories.

=== Industrial demagnetization ===
VALLON produces customized demagnetization systems for various industries including automotive, steel, mechanical engineering, tool manufacturing, medical technology, aerospace, and industrial parts cleaning. Industrial customers include SBS Ecoclean Group, HEMO GmbH, IFSYS, IMS Gear, VACUUMSCHMELZE (VAC), and voestalpine.

=== Personal protective equipment ===
Through its subsidiary FORCEWARE GmbH, VALLON offers certified personal protective equipment for demining operations, including ballistic protection such as BCB2 boots and MPS2 Advanced mine protection suits featuring metal-free designs.

== Operations ==
VALLON operates from a single headquarters located at Arbachtalstraße 10, 72800 Eningen unter Achalm, Germany, employing approximately 100 people. The company maintains a global distribution network of sales representatives.

VALLON exports its products worldwide, with a strong presence in Europe (including NATO and EU member states), the Middle East, Africa, Asia, and North America.

VALLON hand-held mine detectors have been supplied to U.S. military forces through contracts supporting operations in Afghanistan.

The company reports annual revenue of approximately USD 16.6 million (2025) and total assets of EUR 28.2 million (2023).

== Research and partnerships ==
VALLON has participated in European Union research projects, and collaborates with academic institutions. The company works with the Faculty of Electrical Engineering and Computing at the University of Zagreb on the "Metashape" research project.

Additionally, VALLON contributed to the EU-funded TIRAMISU project, focused on developing an integrated toolbox for humanitarian demining.

VALLON has taken part in events associated with the NATO Military Engineering Centre of Excellence Industry Day, an annual forum in Ingolstadt, Germany.
