= Browning BLR =

BLR
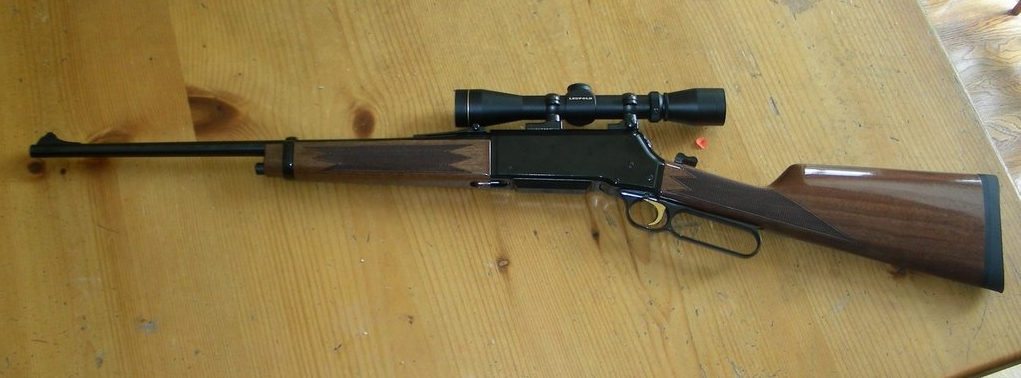
- A Browning BLR, with the addition of a scope
- Type: Lever action rifle
- Place of origin: United States

Production history
- Designer: Karl R. Lewis
- Designed: 1960s
- Manufacturer: Browning Arms Company
- Produced: 1971-Present
- Variants: Model '81, Lightning BLR

Specifications
- Mass: 6 lb 8 oz—7 lb 12 oz (2.9—3.5 kg)
- Barrel length: 16–24 inches (410–610 mm)
- Cartridge: Numerous
- Action: Lever-action, interrupted thread
- Feed system: 3-5 round detachable magazine
- Sights: Open sights, drilled and tapped for optional scope mounts

The Browning BLR is a lever-action rifle manufactured for Browning Arms Company by Miroku Firearms in Japan. It comes in many different variations and is chambered in numerous calibers from small and fast (.22-250 Remington and .243 Winchester) to the large Magnum rounds (7mm Remington Magnum, .300 Winchester Magnum), and the large bore .450 Marlin.

== Design ==
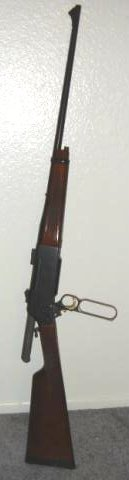
Browning BLR in 7mm Remington Magnum (note the gear in the open action)

The BLR uses a detachable box magazine. Because of this, the BLR can be chambered for rounds with pointed tip Spitzer bullets that could be a safety issue for the tubular magazine more commonly used in lever-action rifles where a pointed bullet may, through the forces of recoil, strike the next round's primer and ignite that round. The rack and pinion geared lever and bolt design can accommodate high-pressure modern magnum rounds. A notable feature is that the trigger moves with the lever when it is operated, which prevents the shooter's trigger finger from being pinched between the lever and the stock when the lever is closed.

== Variants ==
Production of the BLR began in the 1960s. The original "Model 81 BLR" revision had a steel receiver, which was changed to an aluminum alloy receiver with the introduction of the "Model 81 Lightning BLR" in 1995. Although this made the rifle lighter, many owners prefer the steel receiver version. The Model 81 also incorporates changes to the action. The rifles are made in short-action and long-action models to accommodate a variety of calibers and is available with a straight-grip or pistol-grip stock. A takedown model for easy transportation and shipping is also available. The Black Label Edition include a rugged straight grip laminated wood stock, matte black finish on the metalwork, a multitude of Picatinny scope bases and a 16-inch barrel fitted with a flash hider.

== Cartridges available ==
Cartridges available in the Browning BLR:

- .22-250 Remington
- .222 Remington
- .223 Remington
- .257 Roberts (Discontinued)
- .25-06 Remington (Limited run of 150 for Kones Korner)
- .243 Winchester
- .270 Winchester
- .270 Winchester Short Magnum
- .284 Winchester (Discontinued)
- .30-06 Springfield
- .300 Winchester Magnum
- .300 Winchester Short Magnum
- .308 Winchester
- .325 Winchester Short Magnum
- .358 Winchester discontinued
- .450 Marlin
- 6.5mm Creedmoor
- 7mm Remington Magnum
- 7mm Winchester Short Magnum
- 7mm-08 Remington

== See also ==
- Savage Model 99
- Winchester Model 88/Sako VL63 Finnwolf
- Winchester Model 1895
