= .300 =

.300 may refer to:

- .300 AAC Blackout, rifle cartridge
- .300 Winchester Magnum, rifle cartridge
- .300 Remington Ultra Magnum, rifle cartridge
- .300 Winchester Short Magnum, rifle cartridge
- .300 Whisper, subsonic rifle cartridge
- .300 Lapua Magnum, rifle cartridge
- .300 Savage, rifle cartridge
- .300 Weatherby Magnum, rifle cartridge
- .300 Norma Magnum, rifle cartridge
- .300 H&H Magnum, rifle cartridge
- .300 Remington Short Action Ultra Magnum, rifle cartridge
- .300 Rook, obsolete rifle cartridge
- .300 Sherwood, obsolete rifle cartridge
- .300 Ruger Compact Magnum, rifle cartridge
- .300, a significant batting average in baseball

== See also ==
- 300 (disambiguation)
