= Saum =

Saum may refer to:

- Remington Short Action Ultra Magnum rifle cartridges, also known as RSAUM, and RSUM, available in two calibers:
  - .300 SAUM
  - 7mm SAUM
- Sawm, an Arabic word for the practice of fasting as regulated by Islamic jurisprudence
- Saum, Minnesota, United States, an unincorporated community

== People ==
- Claude Saum (1875-19??), a lawyer and state legislator in Illinois
- Roland Saum, former guitarist for the Swiss band Sportsguitar
- Sherri Saum (born 1974), American actress

== See also ==
- Gold saum
- Murder of Michelle Saum Schofield
