= 7 mm caliber =

Firearm cartridge classification

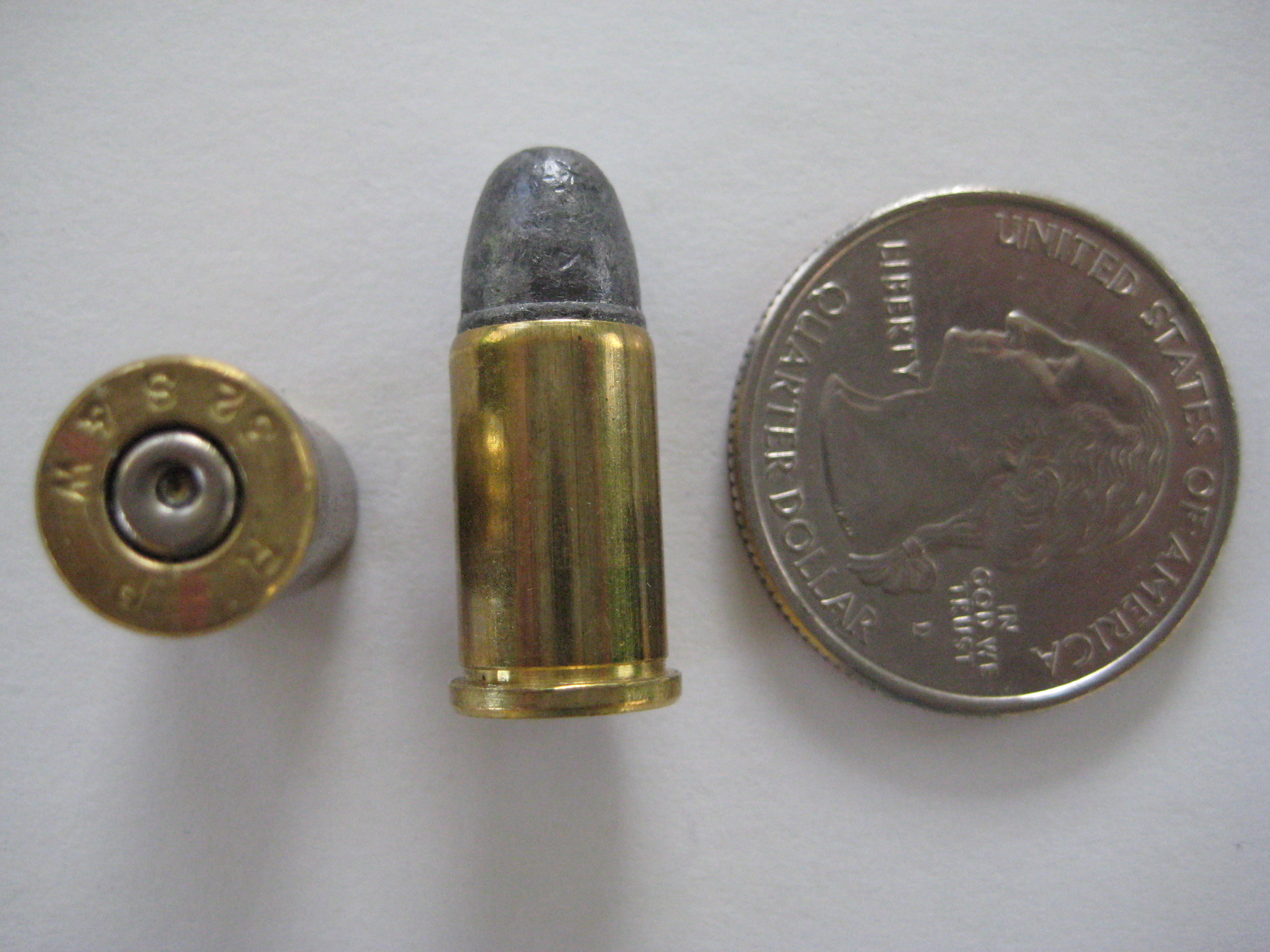
- Example of a 7 mm cartridge, a .32 S&W
- Firearm cartridges
- « 5 mm, 6 mm 7 mm 8 mm, 9 mm »

This is a list of firearm cartridges which have bullets in the 7.00 to 7.99 millimetres (0.2756 to 0.3146 in) caliber range.

- Length refers to the cartridge case length.
- OAL refers to the overall length of the cartridge.

All measurements are in mm (in).

== Pistol cartridges ==
Name	Date	Bullet	Case type	Case length	Rim	Base	Shoulder	Neck	Overall length
7×20mm Nambu	1903	7.112 (.280)	rimless bottleneck	19.81 (0.78)	9.12 (.359)	8.91 (.351)	8.56 (.337)	7.52 (.296)	26.92 (1.06)
7.5 FK BRNO	2014	7.8 mm (.307)	rimless bottleneck	27.0 (1.063)	-	10.8 (.425)	10.8 (.425)	-	35.0 (1.378)
.30 AMP		7.62	-	-	-	-	-	-	
7.62×42mm	2011	7.62	rimless bottleneck	42.0	-	-	-	-	42.0
7.65mm Roth–Sauer	1901	7.645 (.301)	rimless straight	12.95 (0.51)	8.51 (.335)	8.51 (.335)	-	8.43 (.332)	21.34 (0.84)
7.62×25mm Tokarev	1930	7.798 (.307)	rimless bottleneck	24.99 (.984)	9.96 (.392)	9.83 (.387)	9.47 (.373)	8.48 (.334)	34.29 (1.35)
7.65×25mm Borchardt	1893	7.798 (.307)	rimless bottleneck	25.15 (.990)	9.91 (.390)	9.78 (.385)	9.4 (.370)	8.41 (.331)	34.54 (1.36)
7.65mm Mannlicher	1901	7.823 (.308)	rimless straight	21.34 (0.84)	8.48 (.334)	8.43 (.332)	-	8.41 (.331)	28.45 (1.12)
7.63×25mm Mauser	1896	7.823 (.308)	rimless bottleneck	25.15 (.990)	9.91 (.390)	9.68 (.368)	9.4 (.370)	8.43 (.332)	34.54 (1.36)
7.65mm Longue	1917	7.849 (.309)	rimless straight	19.81 (0.78)	8.56 (.337)	8.56 (.337)	-	8.53 (.336)	30.23 (1.19)
7.65×21mm Parabellum (7.65 mm Luger)	1898	7.861 (.3095)	rimless bottleneck	21.59 (.850)	10.01 (.394)	9.906 (.390)	9.627 (.379)	8.433 (.332)	29.84 (1.175)
7.92x24mm VBR	2006	7.92	rimless straight						
.32 ACP (7.65 Browning Short)	1899	7.938 (.3125)	semi-rimmed straight	17.27 (.680)	9.093 (.358)	8.585 (.338)	N/A	8.55 (.336)	25.0 (.984)
.32 NAA	2002	7.938 (.3125)	rimless bottleneck	17.27 (.680)	9.50 (.374)	9.50 (.374)	9.47 (.373)	8.55 (.336)	25.0 (.984)
.30 Super Carry	2022	7.95 (.313)	rimless straight	21.0 (.827)	8.8 (.344)	8.8 (.345)	-	8.56 (.337)	29.69 (1.169)

== Revolver cartridges ==
Name	Bullet	Case type	Case length	Rim	Base	Neck	OAL
.30 Short	7.26 (.286)	rimmed straight	13.08 (.515)	8.79 (.346)	7.42 (.292)	7.42 (.292)	20.88 (.822)
7.62×38mmR	7.82 (.308)	rimmed straight	38.86 (1.53)	9.855 (.388)	8.51 (.335)	7.26 (.286)	38.86 (1.53)
.32 Smith & Wesson	7.950 (.312)	rimmed straight	15.49 (0.61)	9.53 (.375)	8.51 (.335)	8.48 (.334)	23.37 (0.92)
.32 Short Colt (.320 Revolver)	7.950 (.313)	rimmed straight	16.51 (.650)	9.576 (.377)	8.077 (.318)	7.95 (.313)	24.38 (.960)
.32 Long Colt (.32 Colt)	7.950 (.313)	rimmed straight	23.37 (0.92)	9.500 (.374)	8.077 (.318)	7.95 (.313)	32.00 (1.26)
.32 S&W Long (.32 Colt New Police)	7.950 (.312)	rimmed straight	23.62 (0.93)	9.53 (.375)	8.51 (.335)	8.48 (.334)	32.26 (1.27)
.32 H&R Magnum	7.950 (.312)	rimmed straight	27.3 (1.075)	9.5 (.375)	8.6 (.337)	8.6 (.337)	34.30 (1.35)
.327 Federal Magnum	7.950 (.312)	rimmed straight	30.00 (1.20)	9.5 (.375)	8.6 (.337)	8.6 (.337)	37.00 (1.47)

== Rifle cartridges ==
=== 6.8 mm (.277 in) rifle cartridges (commonly known as .270 or 6.8 mm) ===
Name	Bullet	Case length	Rim	Base	Shoulder	Neck	OAL
.270 British	7.04 mm (0.277 in)	46 mm (1.8 in)	11.3 mm (0.44 in)	11.3 mm (0.44 in)	-	-	62.3 (2.45)
.277 Wolverine	7.04 mm (0.277 in)	39 mm (1.5 in)	9.60 (.378)	9.58 (.377)	9.04 (.356)	7.85 (.3089)	57.40 (2.26) max. COAL (typical)
.270 Weatherby Magnum	7.04 mm (0.277 in)	65 (2.55)	13.50 (.5315)	12.997 (.5117)	12.49 (.492)	7.747 (.305)	83.69 (3.295)
.27 Nosler	7.04 mm (0.277 in)	65.79 (2.590)	13.56 (.534)	13.970 (.5500)	13.416 (.5282)	7.976 (.3140)	84.84 (3.340)
.270 Winchester	7.04 mm (0.277 in)	64.52 (2.540)	12.01 (.473)	11.933 (.4698)	11.201 (.4410)	7.82 (.308)	84.84 (3.340)
.270 Winchester Short Magnum	7.04 mm (0.277 in)	53.34 (2.100)	13.59 (.535)	14.097 (.5550)	13.665 (.538)	7.976 (.3140)	72.64 (2.860)
.277 FURY	7.04 mm (0.277 in)	51.18 (2.015)	11.99 (.4720)	11.95 (.4703)	11.71 (.4611)	7.87 (.3100)	71.76 (2.825)
6.8mm Remington SPC	7.04 mm (0.277 in)	42.835 (1.6864)	10.72 (.422)	10.686 (.4207)	10.196 (.4014)	7.772 (.306)	57.40 (2.260)
6.8 Western	7.04 mm (0.277 in)	51.31 (2.020)	13.59 (.535)	14.097 (.5550)	13.667 (.5381)	7.98 (.314)	75.06 (2.955)

=== 7.0 mm (.284 in) rifle cartridges (commonly known as 7mm) ===
Name	Date	Type	Bullet	Case length	Rim	Base	Shoulder	Neck	OAL
.276 Enfield	1912	rimless	7.163 (.282)	59.69 (2.35)	13.13 (.517)	13.41 (.528)	11.7 (.460)	8.20 (.323)	82.04 (3.23)
.284 Winchester	1963	rebated rim	7.214 (.284)	55.12 (2.170)	12.01 (.473)	12.72 (.501)	12.06 (.475)	8.13 (.320)	71.12 (2.80)
7mm Backcountry	2025		7.214 (.284)	61.39 (2.417)	11.99 (.472)	11.93 (.4698)	11.65 (.4585)	8.05 (.317)	84.84 (3.34)
7mm BR Remington (bench rest)	1978		7.214 (.284)	38.61 (1.520)	12.01 (.473)	11.94 (.470)	11.68 (.460)	7.82 (.308)	-
.280 British	1945		7.214 (.284)	43.434 (1.71)	11.633(.458)	11.94 (.470)	11.38 (.448)	7.95 (.313)	64.516 (2.54)
.280/30 British			7.214 (.284)	43.434 (1.71)	12.01 (.473)	11.94 (.470)	11.38 (.448)	7.95 (.313)	64.516 (2.54)
7mm-08 Remington	1980		7.214 (.284)	51.689 (2.035)	12.01 (.473)	11.94 (.470)	11.53 (.454)	8.00 (.315)	71.12 (2.80)
7mm Raptor			7.214 (.284)	40.0 (1.575)	9.6 (.378)	9.548 (.3759)	9.103 (.3573)	-	57.4 (2.26)
7mm Remington SAUM	2002		7.214 (.284)	51.69 (2.035)	13.564 (.534)	13.97 (.550)	13.564 (.534)	8.128 (.320)	71.76 (2.825)
7-30 Waters			7.214 (.284)	52 (2.04)	12.9 (.506)	10.7 (.422)	10.137 (.3991)	7.8 (.306)	64 (2.52)
7mm WSM			7.214 (.284)	53.34 (2.100)	13.59 (.535)	14.10 (.555)	13.67 (.538)	8.15 (.321)	72.64 (2.860)
7mm PRC (Precision Rifle Cartridge)	2022	rimless	7.224 (.2844)	57.91 (2.28)	13.51 (.532)	13.513 (.532)	13.148 (.5176)	8.05 (.317)	3.090 (78.49) MIN; 3.340 (84.84) MAX
7mm Remington Magnum	1962		7.214 (.284)	63.50 (2.50)	13.51 (.532)	13.00 (.512)	12.47 (.491)	8.00 (.315)	83.56 (3.290)
7mm Dakota			7.214 (.284)	63.50 (2.500)	13.84 (.545)	13.84 (.545)	13.49 (.531)	8.00 (.315)	-
.280 Remington; 7mm-06 Remington; 7mm Remington Express	1957		7.214 (.284)	64.52 (2.54)	12.01 (.473)	11.94 (.470)	11.20 (.441)	8.00 (.315)	84.58 (3.33)
7mm Weatherby Magnum	1940s		7.214 (.284)	65.0 (2.55)	13.5 (.530)	13.0 (.511)	12.4 (.490)	7.9 (.312)	83.0 (3.25)
7mm STW (Shooting Times Westerner)			7.214 (.284)	72.39 (2.850)	13.02 (.5126)	13.51 (.532)	12.36 (.4868)	8.00 (.315)	91.44 (3.60)
7mm Remington Ultra Magnum			7.214 (.284)	72.39 (2.85)	13.564 (.534)	13.97 (.550)	13.335 (.525)	8.179 (.322)	92.71 (3.650)
7x61mm Sharpe & Hart			7.214 (.284)	60.8 (2.394)	13.5 (.532)	13.08 (.515)	12.14 (.478)	8.12 (.320)	83.06 (3.27)
.276 Pedersen	1923		7.218 (.284)	51.38 (2.023)	11.43 (.450)	11.43 (.450)	9.78 (.385)	7.95 (.313)	72.39 (2.85)
.28 Nosler	2015		7.226 (.2845)	65.79 (2.590)	13.56 (.534)	13.970 (.5500)	13.399 (.5275)	8.128 (.3200)	84.84 (3.340)
.280 Ackley Improved			7.226 (.2845)	64.14 (2.525)	11.99 (.472)	11.900 (.4685)	11.534 (.4541)	8.001 (.3150)	84.58 (3.330)
7×57mm Mauser; 7mm Mauser; Spanish Mauser.275 Bore	1892		7.24 (.285)	57.00 (2.244)	12.01 (.473)	11.99 (.472)	10.92 (.430)	8.23 (.324)	77.72 (3.06)
7×64mm			7.24 (.285)	64.00 (2.520)	11.95 (.470)	11.85 (.467)	10.80 (.425)	7.95 (.313)	84.00 (3.307)
7×33mm Sako	1942		7.26 (.286)	33.33 (1.312)	10.00 (.394)	9.93 (.391)	9.52 (.375)	7.95 (.313) tapering to 7.90 (.311)	44.44 (1.750)
.280 Ross.280 Rimless.280 Nitro	1907		7.29 (.287)	65.79 (2.59)	14.12 (.556)	13.56 (.534)	10.26 (.404)	8.05 (.317)	88.9 (3.50)

=== 7.8 mm (.308 in) rifle cartridges (commonly known as .308, 30 caliber, 7.62 mm) ===
Name	Bullet	Case length	Rim	Base	Shoulder	Neck	OAL
7.35×51mm Carcano	7.57 (.298)	51.50 (2.028)	11.40 (0.449)	11.40 (0.449)	10.85 (0.427)	8.32 (0.328)	73.70 (2.902)
7.5×55mm Swiss	7.77 (.306)	55.499 (2.185)	12.598 (.496)	12.548 (.494)	11.481 (.452)	8.484 (.334)	77.47 (3.05)
.30 Carbine	7.798 (.307)	32.77 (1.290)	9.14 (.360)	8.99 (.354)	N/A	8.41 (.331)	41.91 (1.65)
.30 Pedersen	7.82 (.308)	19.76 (.778)	8.48 (.334)	8.48 (.334)	N/A	8.43 (.332)	30.38 (1.196)
7.62×40mm Wilson Tactical	7.82 (.308)	39.8 (1.565)	9.6 (.378)	9.6 (.377)	-	-	57.15 (2.25)
7.62×51mm NATO	7.82 (.308)	51.05 (2.01)	11.94 (.470)	11.84 (.466)	11.35 (.447)	8.58 (.338)	69.85 (2.75)
.308 Winchester	7.82 (.308)	51.18 (2.015)	11.94 (.470)	11.94 (.470)	11.53 (.454)	8.74 (.344)	69.85 (2.75)
.300 RSAUM	7.82 (.308)	51.181 (2.015)	13.564 (.534)	13.97 (.550)	13.564 (.534)	8.74 (.344)	71.8 (2.825)
7.5×54mm French	7.82 (.308)	53.59 (2.11)	12.24 (.482)	12.19 (.480)	11.2 (.441)	8.64 (.340)	75.95 (2.99)
.30-40 Krag	7.82 (.308)	58.674 (2.31)	13.84 (.545)	11.608 (.457)	10.541 (.415)	8.585 (.338)	78.74 (3.10)
.300 Winchester Magnum	7.82 (.308)	66.55 (2.62)	13.51 (.532)	13.03 (.513)	12.42 (.489)	8.61 (.339)	84.84 (3.34)
.300 Weatherby Magnum	7.82 (.308)	71.75 (2.825)	13.49 (.531)	13 (.512)	12.5 (.492)	8.53 (.336)	90.47 (3.562)
.300 H&H Magnum	7.82 (.308)	72.4 (2.850)	13.5 (.532)	13.0 (.513)	11.4 (.450)	8.6 (.338)	91.40 (3.600)
.300 RUM	7.82 (.308)	72.39 (2.850)	13.564 (.534)	13.97 (.550)	13.335 (.525)	8.74 (.344)	90.30 (3.555)
.30-378 Weatherby Magnum	7.82 (.308)	73.99 (2.913)	14.71 (.579)	14.78 (.582)	14.25 (.561)	8.56 (.337)	93.73 (3.690)
.300 Savage	7.82 (.308)	47.5 (1.871)	12.01 (.473)	11.96 (.471)	11.3 (.446)	8.6 (.339)	66.04 (2.60)
.303 Savage	7.82 (.308)	51.2 (2.015)	12.8 (.505)	11.2 (.442)	10.5 (.413)	8.5 (.333)	64.01 (2.520)
.30 Remington	7.82 (.308)	52.3 (2.06)	10.7 (.422)	10.7 (.421)			64.14 (2.525)
.308 Norma Magnum	7.82 (.308)	65.0 (2.56)	13.5 (.531)	13.0 (.513)	12.4 (.489)	8.6 (.340)	83.82 (3.30)
.300 Lapua Magnum	7.82 (.308)	69.73 (2.745)	14.93 (.588)	14.91 (.587)	13.82 (.544)	8.73 (.344)	94.50 (3.72)
30 BR	7.82 (.308)	38.41 (1.512)	12.01 (.473)	11.94 (.470)	11.66 (.459)	8.33 (.328)	58.00 (2.283)
.300 WSM (Winchester Short Magnum)	7.823 (.308)	53.34 (2.100)	13.59 (.535)	14.10 (.555)	13.665 (.538)	8.74 (.344)	72.64 (2.860)
.30 Newton	7.823 (.308)	64 (2.52)	13.3 (.525)	13.3 (.523)	12.5 (.491)	8.6 (.340)	85 (3.35)
300 Precision Rifle Cartridge	7.833 (.3084)	65.53 (2.580)	13.51 (.532)	13.513 (.5320)	13.080 (.5150)	8.66 (.341)	93.98 (3.700)
.30-06 Springfield	7.835 (.3085)	63.35 (2.494)	12.01 (.473)	11.94 (.470)	11.07 (.436)	8.628 (.3397)	84.84 (3.340)
.30-03 Springfield	7.835 (.3085)	64.52 (2.54)	12.01 (.473)	11.94 (.470)	11.2 (.441)	8.64 (.340)	84.84 (3.340)
300 AAC Blackout	7.849 (.3090)	34.75 (1.368)	9.60 (.378)	9.548 (.3759)	9.161 (.3607)	8.484 (.3340)	57.40 (2.260)
300 Ruger Compact Magnum	7.849 (.3090)	53.34 (2.100)	13.51 (.532)	13.513 (.5320)	13.081 (.5150)	8.636 (.3400)	72.14 (2.840)
.30-30 Winchester	7.849 (.309)	51.79 (2.039)	12.85 (.506)	10.72 (.422)	10.18 (.401)	8.46 (.333)	64.77 (2.550)
30 Remington AR	7.849 (.3090)	38.86 (1.530)	12.50 (.492)	12.700 (.5000)	12.407 (.4885)	8.687 (.3420) tapering to 8.661 (.3410)	57.40 (2.260)
.307 Winchester	7.849 (.3090)	51.18 (2.015)	12.85 (.506)	11.946 (.4703)	11.532 (.4540)	8.725 (.3435)	56.02 (2.550)
300 HAM'R	7.849 (.309)	40.72 (1.603)	9.60 (.378)	9.548 (.3759)	9.261 (.3646)	8.43 (.332)	57.40 (2.260)
7.62×45mm	7.85 (.309)	44.9 (1.768)	11.18 (.440)	11.20 (.441)	10.46 (.412)	8.48 (.334)	60.00 (2.560)
7.62×53mmR	7.85 (.309)	53.50 (2.106)	14.40 (.567)	12.42 (.489)	11.61 (.457)	8.55 (.337) tapering to 8.50 (.335)	77.00 (3.031)
.300 Norma Magnum	7.83mm (.308in)	63.3 mm (2.492 in)	14.93mm (.588 in)	14.87mm (.585 in)	14.29mm (.563 in)	8.68mm (.342 in)	93.5mm (3.681 in)
.300 LRH	-	-	-	-	-	-	-
7.82 Warbird	-	-	-	-	-	-	-
.300 Werewolf	-	-	-	-	-	-	-

=== 7.87 mm (.310 in) and greater rifle cartridges ===
Name	Bullet	Case length	Rim	Base	Shoulder	Neck	OAL
7.62×39mm M43	7.899 (.311)	38.65 (1.522)	11.30 (.445)	11.25 (.443)	10.01 (.394)	8.636 (.340)	55.80 (2.197)
7.62×54mmR	7.92 (.31)	53.72 (2.115)	14.48 (.570)	12.37 (0.487)	11.61 (.452)	8.53 (.335)	77.16 (3.038)
.303 British	7.925 (.312)	55.88 (2.2)	13.46 (.530)	11.61 (.457)	10.19 (.401)	8.53 (.336)	76.48 (3.011)
.32-20 Winchester.32-20 WCF	7.937 (.3125)	33.401 (1.315)	10.287 (.405)	8.966 (.353)	8.687 (.342)	8.280 (.326)	40.386 (1.59)
7.65×53mm Argentine	7.95 (.313)	53.188 (2.094)	11.938 (.470)	11.887 (.468)	10.897 (.429)	8.585 (.338)	75.387 (2.968)
7.7×58mm Arisaka	7.95 (.313)	57.15 (2.25)	11.94 (.470)	11.89 (.468)	10.9 (.429)	8.59 (.338)	74.93 (2.95)
