= .325 Winchester Short Magnum =

Rifle cartridge

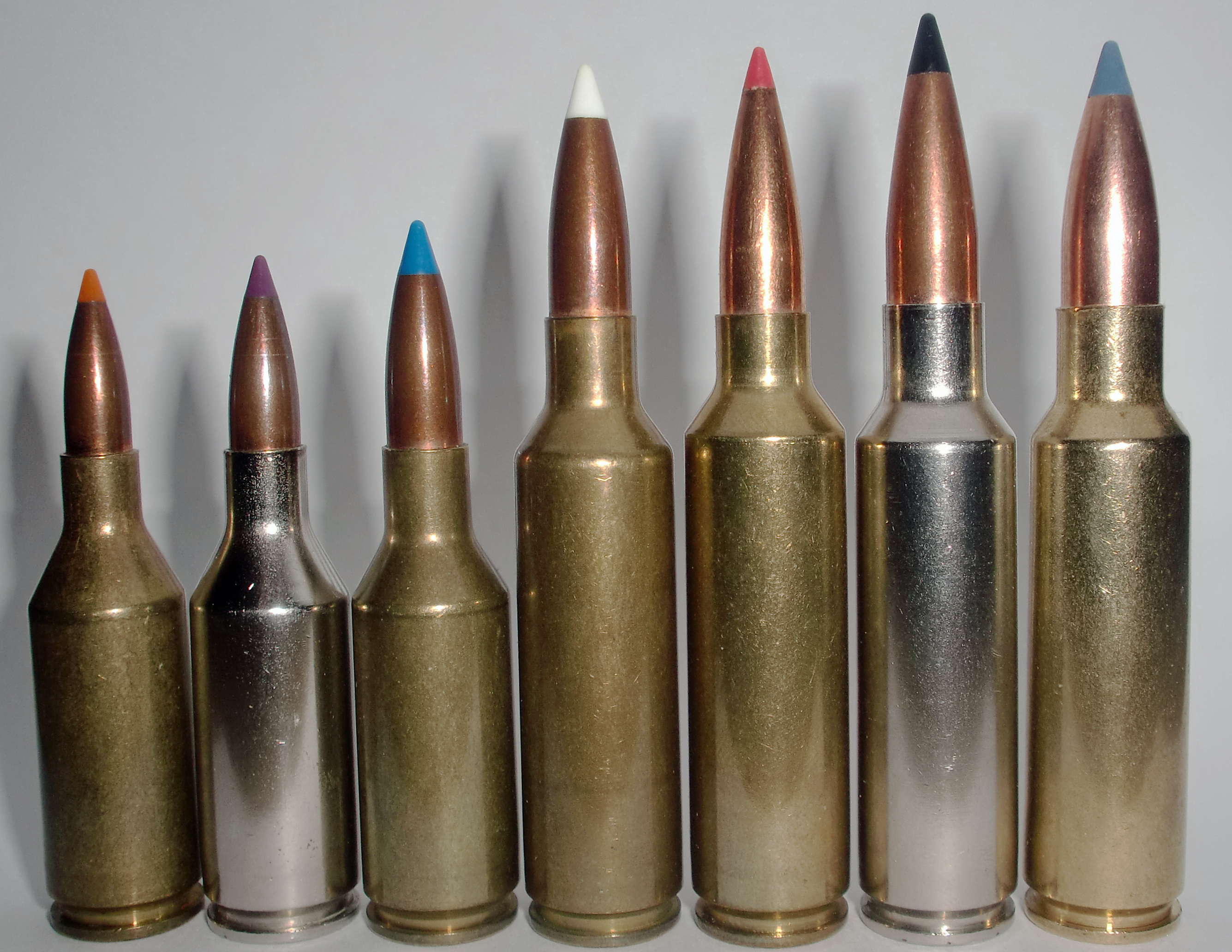
- WSM and WSSM family of cartridges. From left to right: .223 WSSM, .243 WSSM, .25 WSSM, .270 WSM, 7 mm WSM, .300 WSM, .325 WSM.
- Type: Rifle
- Place of origin: United States

Service history
- In service: Never issued

Production history
- Designer: Winchester
- Designed: 2005
- Manufacturer: Winchester
- Produced: 2005–present

Specifications
- Parent case: .300 Winchester Short Magnum
- Case type: Rebated-rimmed, bottleneck
- Bullet diameter: .323 in (8.2 mm)
- Land diameter: .315 in (8.0 mm)
- Neck diameter: .350 in (8.9 mm)
- Shoulder diameter: .538 in (13.7 mm)
- Base diameter: .555 in (14.1 mm)
- Rim diameter: .535 in (13.6 mm)
- Case length: 2.100 in (53.3 mm)
- Overall length: 2.860 in (72.6 mm)
- Case capacity: 83 gr H_{2}O (5.4 cm^{3})
- Rifling twist: 1 in 10 in (254 mm)
- Primer type: Large rifle magnum
- Maximum pressure (C.I.P.): 63,091 psi (435.00 MPa)
- Maximum pressure (SAAMI): 65,000 psi (450 MPa)

Ballistic performance
| Bullet mass/type | Velocity | Energy |
|---|---|---|
| 180 gr (12 g) Ballistic Silvertip | 3,060 ft/s (930 m/s) | 3,743 ft⋅lbf (5,075 J) |
| 200 gr (13 g) AccuBond CT | 2,950 ft/s (900 m/s) | 3,866 ft⋅lbf (5,242 J) |
| 220 gr (14 g) Power-Point | 2,840 ft/s (870 m/s) | 3,941 ft⋅lbf (5,343 J) |
- Test barrel length: 24 in (610 mm); Source: Winchester Ammunition

The .325 Winchester Short Magnum, commonly known as the 325 WSM, is an 8mm caliber rebated rim bottlenecked centerfire short magnum medium bore cartridge. The cartridge was introduced by Winchester Ammunition in 2005.

Introduced at the 2005 Shot Show in Las Vegas, NV, it is the largest member of the Winchester Short Magnum family of cartridges. The .325 WSM was intended for the hunting of medium and large bodied thin skinned dangerous and non-dangerous big game animals of Africa, Asia, Europe and North America.

== History and origin ==
Since the introduction of the .300 WSM in 2000 there had been speculation that Winchester and Browning would release further cartridges based on the cartridge case of the .300 WSM. Then in 2001 Winchester announced the release of the .270 WSM and the 7mm WSM cartridges. The common wisdom indicated that Winchester would release a .33 calibre (8.38 mm) cartridge based on the .300 WSM case. However, Winchester surprised the shooting public in 2002 when they introduced the .223 WSSM and the .243 WSSM based on a further shortened WSM case followed by the .25 WSSM in 2003.

The introduction of the .325 WSM in 2005 took the shooting public by surprise, as the 8mm calibre did not have a following in North America. Earlier introductions of 8mm cartridges in North America were met with failure, as the .30 calibre (7.62 mm) was generally considered the calibre of choice among American hunters.

When introduced, Winchester offered the cartridge loaded with a 180 gr (12 g) Ballistic Silvertip at 3,060 ft/s (930 m/s) (SBST325S), a 200 gr (13 g) Combined Technologies Accubond at 2,950 ft/s (900 m/s) (S325WSMCT), and a 220 gr (14 g) Power-Point at 2,840 ft/s (870 m/s) (X325WSM).

== Cartridge design ==
The .325 WSM uses the .300 WSM case necked up to accept the 8mm bullet. The cartridge was influenced by the .404 Jeffery and contemporary cartridge designs calling for a short, fat cartridge operating at high pressures which could be cycled through a short action rifle. The understanding was that such cartridges would provide greater efficiency and uniformity in burning the powder charge which in turn would promote a greater inherent accuracy of the cartridge. The rebated rim design allows for the cartridge to utilize actions chambered for rifles based on the .375 Holland & Holland bolt face diameter.

The WSM case was designed to be loaded with .30 calibre (7.62mm) bullets. An aspect of the short, fat cartridge design is that it has a narrower acceptable calibre range than a longer cartridge case. It was for this reason that Winchester introduced the WSSM cartridge case to load sub .27 calibre (6.8mm) bullets. During the testing phase, Winchester had found that, when loaded with .33 calibre bullets, the WSM resulted in the loss of performance and settled for the 8mm calibre instead. Winchester determined that the .32 calibre was the largest calibre that provided a "magnum" level of performance in the WSM case.

== Cartridge dimensions ==
The .325 Winchester Short Magnum has 5.39 ml (83 grain) H_{2}O cartridge case capacity.

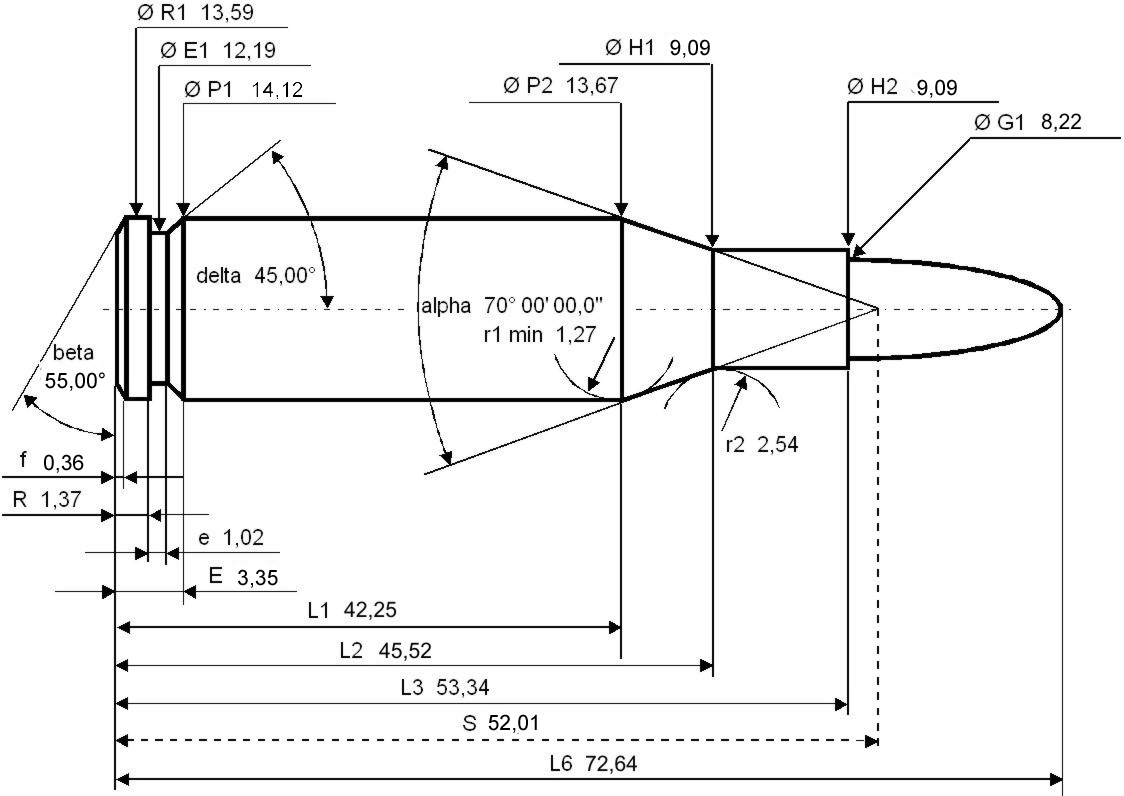

.325 Winchester Short Magnum maximum C.I.P. cartridge dimensions. All sizes in millimetres (mm).

Americans would define the shoulder angle at alpha/2 ≈ 35 degrees. The common rifling twist rate for this cartridge is 254 mm (1 in 10 in), 4 grooves, Ø of the lands = 8.00 mm, Ø grooves = 8.20 mm, land width = 4.47 mm and the primer type is large rifle.

According to the official C.I.P. (Commission Internationale Permanente pour l'Epreuve des Armes à Feu Portatives) rulings the .325 Winchester Short Magnum can handle up to 435 MPa (63,091 psi) piezo pressure. In C.I.P. regulated countries every rifle cartridge combo has to be proofed at 125% of this maximum C.I.P. pressure to certify for sale to consumers.

The .325 Winchester Short Magnum is a Delta L problem cartridge, meaning it can present unexpected chambering and/or feeding problems. The Delta L problem article explains this problem in more detail.

The German 8×68mm S cartridge introduced in 1939 is probably the closest ballistic twin of the .325 Winchester Short Magnum. The .325 Winchester Short Magnum is considerably shorter and fatter and has a more radical rebated rim, much steeper shoulder angle and a shorter neck (7.82 mm) than the 8×68mm S. This makes the 8×68mm S case with its 9.11 mm long neck better suited for loading long heavier bullets and due to its sleeker exterior shape bound to cycle more reliably in bolt-action rifles in extreme situations. On the other hand, the proportions of .325 Winchester Short Magnum promote good internal ballistic efficiency that allows the .325 Winchester Short Magnum to fire shorter lighter bullets at slightly higher muzzle velocities whilst using less propellant than the classically proportioned 8×68mm – that has 5.58 ml (86 grains) H_{2}O cartridge case capacity.

== Performance ==
The .325 WSM is an efficient, flat shooting 8mm magnum rifle cartridge. Bullet weights range from 125 to 250 gr (8.1 to 16.2 g). Performance is on par with the two other magnum cartridges: 8mm Remington Magnum and the German 8×68mmS cartridge with lighter weight bullets. However, these later two cartridges have a distinct edge of being able to seat long heavy 220 gr (14 g) bullets without encroaching upon the powder space. Due to the necessity of seating heavier longer bullets more deeply into the powder column due to the short design and maximum overall length of the .325 WSM cartridge, velocity drops off as bullet weight increases. This is particularly evident with mono-metal bullets such as Nosler's E-Tip bullets, and the Barnes X bullets. These bullets are constructed of copper, which is about 20% less density than that of a conventional lead bullet. The resulting mono-metal bullets are typically longer, which requires these bullets to be seated more deeply to meet standards set for the cartridge and allow reliable feeding and cycling of the cartridges in rifles.

=== 8 mm cartridges compared ===
Maximum muzzle velocity comparison in % of the probably most proliferated European and American 8 mm rifle cartridges out of 650 mm (25.59 in) long barrels loaded with relatively light to heavy 8 mm bullets to their C.I.P. or SAAMI (Sporting Arms and Ammunition Manufacturers' Institute) sanctioned maximum pressures.

| Bullet weight gram (grain) | 8.23 g (127 gr) | 9.72 g (150 gr) | 11.34 g (175 gr) | 12.96 g (200 gr) | 14.26 g (220 gr) | Case capacity (%) |
| 7.92×57mm Mauser (8×57mm IS) | 100.0 | 100.0 | 100.0 | 100.0 | 100.0 | 100.0 |
| 8×64mm S | 102.7 | 102.7 | 102.8 | 102.9 | 102.9 | 110.3 |
| .325 WSM | 108.7 | 109.1 | 109.0 | 109.3 | 111.1 | 131.7 |
| 8×68mm S | 108.4 | 108.5 | 108.7 | 110.5 | 112.3 | 136.5 |
| 8mm Rem. Mag. | 111.9 | 112.3 | 114.5 | 115.3 | 116.0 | 157.1 |

This comparison is not totally objective since the 8mm Remington Magnum and .325 WSM operate at 448.16 MPa (65000 psi), the 8×68mm S at 440 MPa (63817 psi), the 8×64mm S at 405 MPa (58740 psi) and the 7.92×57mm Mauser at 390 MPa (56564 psi) maximum chamber pressure. Higher chamber pressure results in higher muzzle velocities.

== Sporting use ==
The .325 WSM should be considered primarily a hunting or sporting cartridge. It was intended to take medium and large bodied, dangerous thin skinned game up to 1,800 pounds (816 kg). Bullets of 180 gr or less are intended for smaller deer species such as white tail and mule deer, while those of 200 gr or more are intended for elk, moose and large bear. The .325 WSM being an 8mm cartridge could find favour among European hunters for elk (European moose), wild boar as its performance is similar to the vaunted 8×68mm S cartridge. The cartridge is useful for all including the largest bear species. Most outfitters recommend at least a .30 to .375 calibre magnum class cartridge (depending on the hunters recoil threshold) for the larger bear species such as the Alaskan brown bear and the polar bear. Due to the flat shooting and long range performance of the .325 WSM it is also a top performer for most African plains game such as kudu, nyala, wildebeest and zebra.

The .325 WSM has not made inroads in competitive shooting sports or military use. However, on the contrary to what some competitive shooters and sportsman believe, and as mentioned above, for reloaders there are quite an array of bullet sizes and shapes to choose from. Bullet weights from 125 gr to 250 gr are offered by premium bullet makers such as Nosler, Sierra, Barnes, Woodleigh, Swift, Hornady and other major manufactures.

== Rifles ==
Winchester Ammunition's release of the .325 WSM was in conjunction with the release by FN Herstal of rifles chambered in the cartridge under the Browning and Winchester brand names. Originally, Winchester released the Ultimate Shadow, Camo Ultimate Shadow, Classic Featherweight, Classic Laminated, Super Grade RMEF (Rocky Mountain Elk Foundation) and Super Grade III in the 325 WSM while Browning chambered the 325 WSM in their A-Bolt, X-Bolt and BAR rifle lines.

Typical rifles for the WSM line of cartridges have barrels between 22–24 in (560–610 mm) which is less than the typical magnum rifle. The short action combined with short barrels allow for a lighter rifle than a standard magnum rifle which would be based on a standard action with a 26 in (660 mm) barrel.

== See also ==
- Winchester Short Magnum
- List of handgun cartridges
- List of rifle cartridges
- Table of handgun and rifle cartridges
- 8 mm calibre
