= Remington Ultra Magnum =

Rifle cartridge

Remington Ultra Magnum, or RUM, refers to a "family" of cartridges developed between 1999 and 2002 by Remington Arms. All of the RUM cartridges are based on the .404 Jeffery non-belted magnum cartridge. There is a long-case line, as well as a shortened version designed to fit a short rifle action (such as a .308 Winchester). The long case is very large and provides performance that exceeds existing commercial magnums, such as the .300 Winchester Magnum and .300 Weatherby Magnum.

The short design is the same idea as used in the Winchester Short Magnum cartridges. The shorter cartridges are known as Remington Short Action Ultra Magnum, RSAUM, RSUM, or SAUM.

The RUM family of cartridges are Delta L problem cartridges, meaning they can present unexpected chambering and/or feeding problems. The Delta L problem article explains this problem in more detail.

== Influences ==
=== 7.21 Lazzeroni ===
The RUM family is based on work done creating short magnums by John Lazzeroni, similar to the Winchester Short Magnum line. Lazzeroni's short magnums (7.21 Lazzeroni Tomahawk) were designed to operate in a short-action rifle, instead of requiring a long action. The U.S. Repeating Arms Company was the first major manufacturer to commercialize Lazzeroni's concept, followed shortly thereafter by Remington with their "Short Action Ultra Mag" line.

=== 6 mm Benchrest ===
Another influence was a series of 6 mm cartridges developed for bench-rest target shooting competitions in the 1970s. The idea behind these cartridges was that a short, fat cartridge would be more "efficient" than the traditional long, narrow cartridge, as more of the powder column would be in the immediate vicinity of the primer as it detonated. In turn, this would mean that a cartridge of this type would be able to propel a bullet at speeds comparable to those of "magnum" cartridges of the same caliber using significantly less powder.

== RUM cartridges ==
The cartridges in this family are:

- 7mm Remington Ultra Magnum
- .300 Remington Ultra Magnum also known as the .300 Ultra Mag or .300 RUM
- .338 Remington Ultra Magnum
- .375 Remington Ultra Magnum

== SAUM cartridges ==
- 7mm Remington Short Action Ultra Magnum
- .300 Remington Short Action Ultra Magnum

== See also ==
- List of rifle cartridges
- Table of handgun and rifle cartridges
- Winchester Super Short Magnum
- Super magnum
