= Delta L problem =

Problem in firearms manufacturing

The delta L problem (ΔL problem) refers to certain firearm chambers and the incompatibility of some ammunition made for that chamber. ΔL is a Commission Internationale Permanente (C.I.P.) geometric dimensioning and tolerancing definition for cartridge cases that are longer than the chamber they have to fit in. "Delta L" essentially means "difference in length".

If the chamber in a C.I.P. conforming firearm (a firearm with chamber dimensions specified by the Commission Internationale Permanente) is shorter than a non-C.I.P. conforming maximum sized cartridge (a cartridge with external dimensions larger than specified by the Commission Internationale Permanente), use of that ammunition in the firearm may lead to chambering and/or feeding problems in the shoulder area of the chamber, or other headspace issues.

There is normally no cause for alarm regarding any cartridge designated as a ΔL problem cartridge, as the ΔL problem does not create a dangerous condition in the firearm in the rare event that ΔL problems are actually present.

Firearms users that have to rely on their weapon under adverse conditions, such as dangerous game hunters, obviously have to check the correct functioning of the firearm and ammunition they intend to use before exposing themselves to potentially dangerous situations.

== Delta L (ΔL) problem ==
The length specification "S" is a basic dimension (or a datum reference) for the computation of the dimensions of firearms cartridges and chambers. It designates the distance between the breech contact surface and the apex of the junction cone. When the length values for the peak of the junction cone measure of the cartridge and the chamber are compared it becomes clear that these values do not always agree. A precondition for such a comparison is that the shoulder angles are identical, since otherwise shifts will occur, which are not recognizable at first glance.

.30-06 Springfield maximum C.I.P. cartridge dimensions. All sizes in millimeters (mm).

Junction cone dimensions
alpha (α) = Angle of junction cone (Americans would define the shoulder angle as alpha/2)
S = Length of the peak of the junction cone
r1 min = Radius of junction at the extremities of diameter P2
r2 = Radius of junction between junction cone and collar

The diameters of the cartridge are, logically, smaller than the appropriate diameters of the chamber. But the corresponding lengths "L1" and "L2" are larger. This condition results from the fact that the length of the junction cone becomes longer if the diameter becomes smaller. With most European cartridges, the dimension "S" is always identical. On the other hand, many American cartridge designs exhibit an oversize designated as delta L (ΔL). This leads to the situation that a cartridge manufactured at the upper tolerance limit can not be loaded into a chamber that was manufactured at the lower tolerance limit. Because cartridges are often manufactured in the lower dimensional tolerance limits and chambers tend to be manufactured in the higher dimensional tolerance limits, these problems are often avoided with (semi) automatic and repeating arms. The locking mechanism normally compensates a slight oversize of 0.02 mm – 0.03 mm without any problems.

On the other hand this oversize is a major problem with break action and combination guns, which are less common in the United States than in Europe, because correct cartridges cannot be loaded into correct weapons in the event ΔL was not considered during manufacturing. Break-barrel arms will not close when the cartridges and chamber dimensions are not in concert. For this reason, the chambers of break-barrel arms are generally manufactured with reamers that take ΔL into account.

Generally bolt-action and break-barrel hunting rifles in C.I.P.-regulated countries are not cut to the minimum C.I.P. chamber dimensions so this problem is mostly theoretical. The arms manufacturer SIG Sauer brands Blaser and Mauser are however known for hammer forging tight (but still C.I.P. conform) chambers in their Blaser R93 straight-pull bolt-action and Mauser M03 bolt-action switch barrel rifles and some rifle owners reported ΔL problems with those rifles. These problems can also occur with other European-made rifle brands.

== Conflicting industry standards ==
The main cause for the ΔL is that the two main civilian ammunition and firearms industry standards organizations, C.I.P. and SAAMI, have assigned different standards for the same cartridges. This leads to officially sanctioned conflicting differences between European and American ammunition dimensions and chamber dimensions. Since C.I.P. and SAAMI do not rule nor control civilian ammunition standards worldwide, other causes for conflicting standards leading to ΔL issues are also possible.

== Delta L (ΔL) cartridges list ==
The C.I.P. published a ΔL cartridge and theoretical C.I.P. minimum chamber length shortage dimensions list. The value of ΔL must, however, be taken from the relevant cartridge data information in the C.I.P. Tables. Most cartridges on the list are of American origin, and many are only chambered in commercial firearms manufactured by American companies using SAAMI specifications. The table shows the popular .30-06 Springfield cartridge family with ≈ 0.15 mm (0.0059 in) theoretical chamber length shortage to be the most prominent ΔL problems candidate.

=== List of cartridges for which C.I.P. lists ΔL and the amount in millimeters (mm) ===
Caliber (C.I.P. nomenclature) ΔL (mm)

- .17 Libra 0.25
- .17 Remington 0.07
- .220 Swift 0.10
- .221 Remington Fireball 0.09
- .222 Remington 0.07
- .222 Remington Magnum 0.09
- .22-250 Remington 0.08
- .223 Remington 0.07
- .223 Winchester Super Short Magnum 0.08
- .243 Winchester 0.10
- .243 Winchester Super Short Magnum 0.08
- .25-06 Remington 0.15
- .257 Roberts 0.15
- .260 Remington 0.10
- .270 Winchester 0.15
- .270 Winchester Short Magnum 0.10
- .280 Remington 0.14
- .284 Winchester 0.10
- .300 Lapua Magnum 0.07
- .300 Remington Ultra Magnum 0.11
- .300 Winchester Short Magnum 0.10
- .30-06 Court Cartry 0.16
- .30-06 Springfield 0.16
- .308 EH 0.10
- .308 Winchester 0.10
- .325 Winchester Short Magnum 0.11
- .338 Lapua Magnum 0.05
- .338 Remington Ultra Magnum 0.12
- .35 Remington 0.13
- .35 Whelen 0.15
- .358 Winchester 0.10
- .375 Remington Ultra Magnum 0.10
- .50 BMG 0.28
- 5.45 x 18 0.19
- 5.45 x 39 0.13
- 5.6 x 39 0.06
- 5.7 x 28 0.08
- 6 mm BR Norma 0.07
- 6 mm BR Remington 0.07
- 6 mm Remington (.244 Rem) 0.10
- 6 x 47 SM 0.08
- 6 x 62 Freres 0.12
- 6.5 x 55 SE 0.09
- 6.5 x 64 Brenneke 0.19
- 7 mm BR Remington 0.08
- 7 mm Express Remington 0.14
- 7 mm Remington Ultra Magnum 0.10
- 7 mm Winchester Short Magnum 0.10
- 7 mm-08 Remington 0.10
- 7 x 33 SAKO 0.09
- 7.21 Firebird 0.05
- 7.62 x 39 0.21
- 7.65 x 53 Argentine 0.18
- 7.82 Warbird 0.05

The value of ΔL must be taken from the relevant calibers in the C.I.P. tables.

== Firearm cartridges with otherwise problematic headspaces ==
There are also some firearm calibers with problematic headspaces listed by C.I.P.
The headspace is defined by:

Depth of rim recess

- .303 British
- .38 Special AMU
- 6.35 Browning
- 7.65 Browning
- 9mm Browning Long

Chamber cone

- .220 Swift
- .225 Winchester
- .307 Winchester
- .356 Winchester
- .357 SIG
- .38 Super Auto
- 6.5×50mmSR Arisaka
- 7.62×54mmR
- 9×22mm MJR

End of chamber

- .357 SIG
- 9×25mm Super Auto G

== See also ==
- Unsafe firearm and cartridge combinations
