= Winchester Super Short Magnum =

Cartridge family

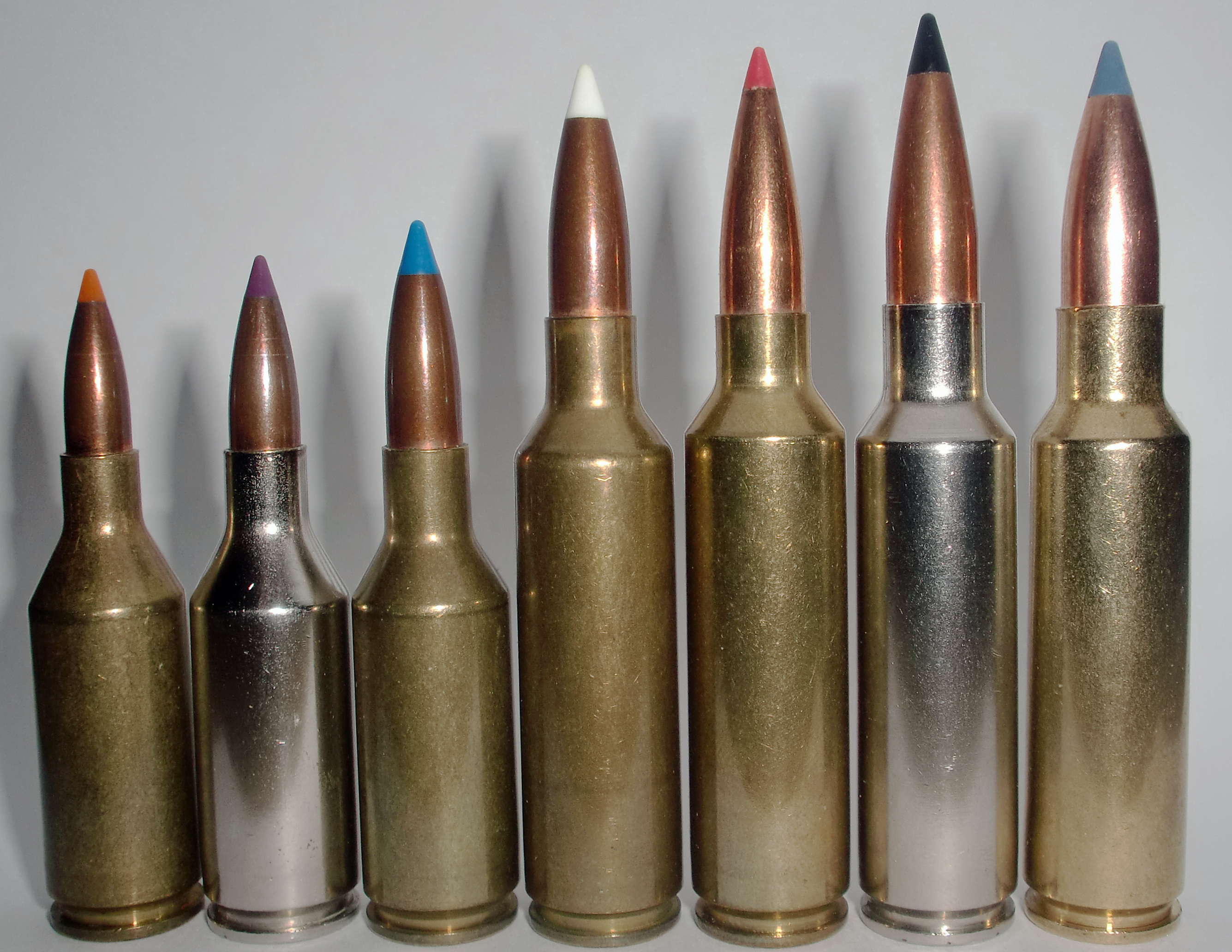
WSM and WSSM family of cartridges. From left to right: .223 WSSM, .243 WSSM, .25 WSSM, .270 WSM, 7 mm WSM, .300 WSM, .325 WSM.

Winchester Super Short Magnum, or WSSM is a line of rebated bottlenecked centerfire short magnum cartridges introduced by the U.S. Repeating Arms Company (Winchester Inc). It is a further development of the Winchester Short Magnum concept utilizing smaller bullets, but of a still higher velocity.

== History ==
Winchester and Browning partnered to create a new shorter version of the popular WSM (Winchester Short magnum) case. The new "super short" case was to be based on design principles currently proving successful in benchrest competition, such as the 6 mm PPC and 6 mm BR Remington. In 2003 the first cartridges of this design, the .223 and .243 Winchester Super Short Magnums (WSSM), were introduced. The .25 WSSM was added to the family in 2004.

None of the cartridges has managed to capture any large market share. This is likely due in part to the fact that all three cartridges have similar performance to existing popular cartridges. In addition, the .223 and .243 versions early on attained a reputation for quickly eroding the rifling in barrels. Concerns about short barrel life are a common problem for high-velocity cartridges, making the WSSM rounds no different than other high-velocity cartridges. To help mitigate the problem, Browning currently uses chrome-lined barrels on all of their guns chambered for .223 WSSM.

On November 2, 2005 the United States District Court, D. Oregon ruled in the case Jamison v. Olin Corporation-Winchester Division, Case Nos. 03-1036-KI (lead case), 04-31-KI, 04-76-KI (D. Or. Nov. 2, 2005). Inventor John R. Jameson had developed and patented several designs for short magnum rifle cartridges. Jameson approached Olin/Winchester ammunition with his invention. The court found that Olin/Winchester and Browning WSSM products had infringed on Jamison's patents without compensation. Rather than pay royalties to Jamison Winchester and Browning halted production of all WSSM rifles.

== Advantages ==
There are basic advantages inherent to the Short Magnum concept. The idea is that the short, fat powder column gives a more uniform load density and ignition rate and therefore a more consistent burn. This in turn should translate into improved accuracy and potentially moderate recoil due to more efficient use of propellants.

Another advantage is the action size. For example, comparing the .25 WSSM to the .25-06 Remington, we find that the .25-06 requires a .30-06 length action, commonly called a standard or long action. The .25 WSSM case which is almost a full inch shorter, can make use of an existing short action such as used by the 5.56 NATO and .223 Remington family of cartridges. Some manufacturers have even created extra short actions to accommodate newer short rounds. The intrinsic accuracy benefits of a short, stiffer action over a long action are well-established principles of rifle design. The resulting rifle is smaller, lighter, more compact, and quicker handling as well.

== Disadvantages ==
The relatively large diameter cases result in reduced magazine capacity and reliability along with a thinner bolt face, meaning it can break easily especially under the higher pressure of the cartridges.

== Cartridge Family ==
The cartridges in this family are, in order of development:

Name	Year	Bullet diameter	Notes
.223 WSSM	2002	.224 in. (5.69 mm)	performance similar to .220 Swift and 22-250
.243 WSSM	2003	.243 in. (6.17 mm)	performance similar to 6 mm Remington and .243 Winchester
.25 WSSM	2004	.257 in. (6.53 mm)	performance similar to .257 Roberts and .25-06 Remington

As with any new case introduced, wildcatters like to see what they can do to make new cartridges. Two of the more notable children or offshoots of this case are the .325 Corbin, which is essentially an 8 mm WSSM, and the .22/40 SMc, which is essentially the .223 WSSM with an elliptical shoulder.

A wildcat cartridge based on the .25 WSSM, called the .358 WSSM or .358 BFG, has similar performance to the standard .358 Winchester and .35 Whelen.

Additionally, Olympic arms created the .300 OSSM, which is a 25 WSSM necked up to .308” giving performance between 30-06 and .300 Winchester Magnum.

== See also ==
- Winchester Short Magnum, parent cartridge.
