= 5.6×57mm =

German rimless hunting rifle cartridge

- Type: Rifle
- Place of origin: Germany

Production history
- Designer: RWS
- Designed: 1964

Specifications
- Parent case: 7×57mm Mauser
- Case type: Rimless, bottlenecked
- Bullet diameter: 5.70 mm (0.224 in)
- Neck diameter: 7.10 mm (0.280 in)
- Shoulder diameter: 10.94 mm (0.431 in)
- Base diameter: 11.90 mm (0.469 in)
- Rim diameter: 11.95 mm (0.470 in)
- Rim thickness: 1.30 mm (0.051 in)
- Case length: 56.70 mm (2.232 in)
- Overall length: 69.00 mm (2.717 in)
- Case capacity: 3.18 cm^{3} (49.1 gr H_{2}O)
- Rifling twist: 250 mm (1 in 9.84")
- Primer type: Large rifle
- Maximum pressure (C.I.P.): 440.00 MPa (63,817 psi)

Ballistic performance
Bullet mass/type	Velocity	Energy
74 gr (5 g) cone-pointed	1,040 m/s (3,400 ft/s)	1,915 J (1,412 ft⋅lbf)
- Test barrel length: 24

The 5.6×57mm (designated as the 5,6 × 57 by the C.I.P.) cartridge was created by Rheinisch-Westfälische Sprengstoffwerke (RWS) in Germany in 1964 by necking down popular 7×57mm Mauser (similarly to how Paul Mauser himself created 6.5×57mm Mauser) for hunting small deer such as roe deer, and for chamois. The calibre has a significant following among European sportsmen, and most European mass production riflemakers chamber several models of rifle for this cartridge. During the 1970-1990 period this cartridge was widely and successfully used in the Republic of Ireland for deer shooting, since security considerations at a period of Provisional Irish Republican Army violence had led to a ban on the civilian ownership of calibres larger than .224in. Some British small deer specialist hunters use the 5.6×57 mm with great success on roe deer, muntjac and Chinese water deer.

With a factory-load velocity of 3,500 ft/s (1,100 m/s) with a 74-grain, cone-pointed bullet, it is approximately 100 ft/s (30 m/s) faster than the .220 Swift cartridge firing a bullet of equivalent weight. The larger case capacity means that handloaders can produce 50-grain loads that, with velocities in excess of 4,100 ft/s (1,200 m/s), will outpace anything that can safely be achieved by the Swift. The .223 Winchester Super Short Magnum is a 21st-century cartridge that is comparable to the 5.6×57 mm.

The 5.6×57mm cartridge case has a distinctively thick case wall, and this causes significant problems when handloading, owing to the force that needs to be used through the press when re-sizing the case neck. It has been suggested that this unusual neck thickness is the result of the use of .22 rimfire chamber adapters in centrefire rifles chambered for this cartridge.

== 5.6×57mm rimmed variant ==
The 5.6×57mmR (designated as the 5,6 × 57 R by the C.I.P.) is a rimmed variant of the 5.6×57mm. The rimmed variant was designed for break-open rifles and is almost identical to the rimless variant except for the rim.

== Specifications ==
- Bullet diameter: 5.69 mm (.224")
- Loads:
  - 74 gr @ 1040 m/s (3412 ft/s)
  - 60 gr @ 3700 ft/s
