= 7mm Winchester Short Magnum =

Rifle cartridge

7 mm Winchester Short Magnum
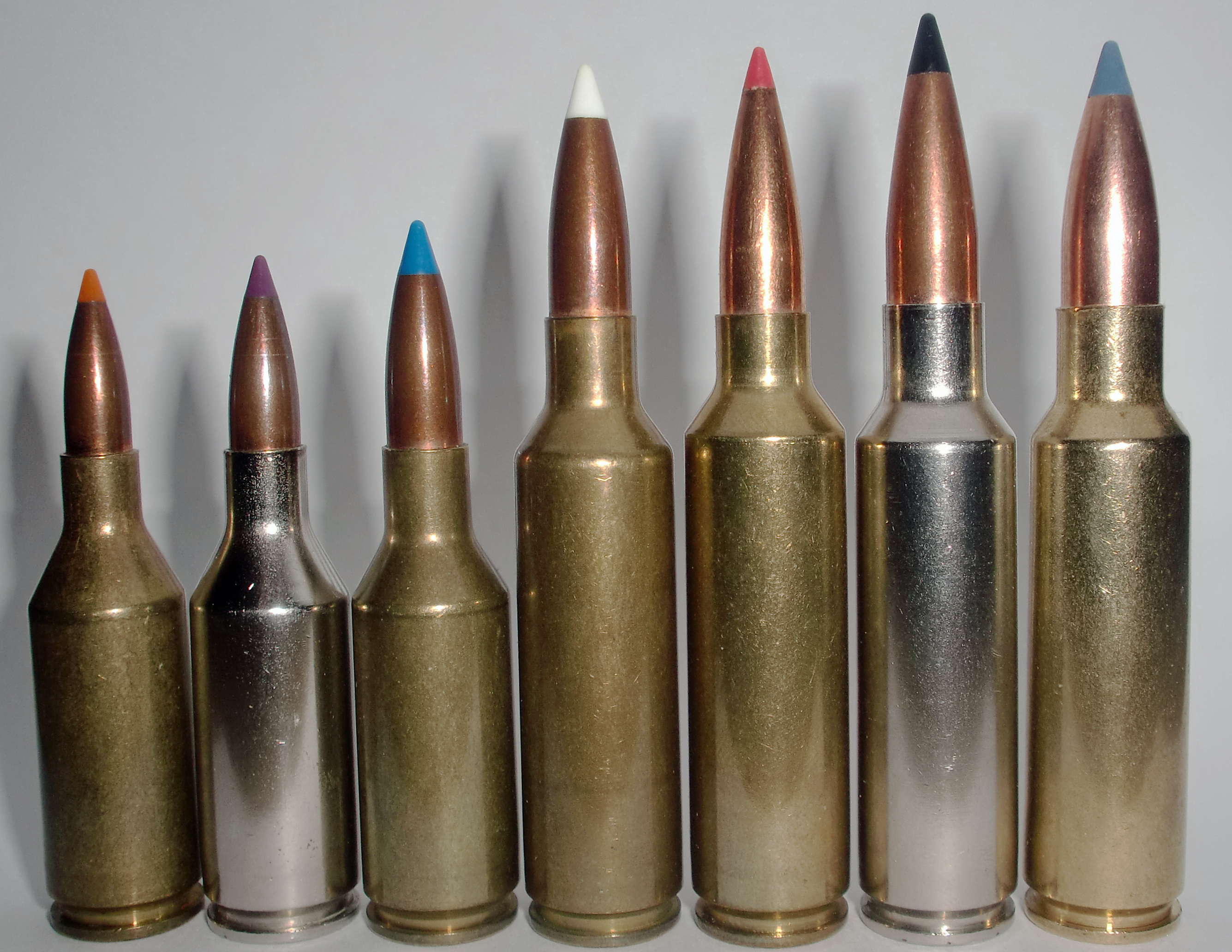
- WSM and WSSM family of cartridges. From left to right: .223 WSSM, .243 WSSM, .25 WSSM, .270 WSM, 7 mm WSM, .300 WSM, .325 WSM.
- Type: Rifle
- Place of origin: United States

Production history
- Designer: Winchester
- Designed: 2001
- Produced: 2001–present

Specifications
- Parent case: .300 Winchester Short Magnum
- Case type: Rebated-rimmed, bottleneck
- Bullet diameter: 0.284 in (7.2 mm)
- Land diameter: 0.277 in (7.0 mm)
- Neck diameter: 0.321 in (8.2 mm)
- Shoulder diameter: 0.538 in (13.7 mm)
- Base diameter: 0.555 in (14.1 mm)
- Rim diameter: 0.535 in (13.6 mm)
- Case length: 2.100 in (53.3 mm)
- Rifling twist: 1 turn in 9.5"
- Primer type: large rifle magnum
- Maximum pressure (C.I.P.): 63,817 psi (440.00 MPa)

Ballistic performance
Bullet mass/type	Velocity	Energy
160 gr (10 g)	3,050 ft/s (930 m/s)	3,304 ft⋅lbf (4,480 J)

The 7mm Winchester Short Magnum (also known as the 7mm WSM) is a centrefire cartridge developed in partnership with Browning Arms Company and Winchester ammunition, making its debut and introduced to the shooting public in 2001. It is a member of the Winchester Short Magnum family of cartridges.

== Specifications ==
The 7mm WSM is similar to the .300 WSM with the case necked down to handle .284" bullets. However, the distance from the case head to the datum line on the shoulder is longer for the 7WSM, preventing accidental chambering or firing of the .284" 7mm bullet in .270 WSM's .277" bore, similar to what was done with the .280 Remington to prevent it from chambering in .270 Winchester rifles.

== Performance ==
The 7mm WSM cartridge achieves its purpose as an excellent cartridge for larger mule deer, sheep, black bear and elk.

Winchester claims a muzzle velocity (MV) of 3,225 ft/s with a 140 grain bullet for their 7mm WSM cartridge; the claimed muzzle energy (ME) is 3,233 ft. lbs. With a 160 grain bullet the Winchester figures are 2990 ft/s and 3176 ft. lbs. at the muzzle. The lighter, shorter 7mm bullets are preferred in these short case magnums.

== Popularity ==
The 7mm WSM has failed to gain the same popularity as the other cartridges in the WSM family. Some people erroneously believe the short case necks make the 7mm WSM poorly suited to heavier bullets, limiting the cartridge's usefulness on larger game. It is no different in this respect than the popular 300 Winchester Magnum.

Cost is another factor limiting popularity. Ammunition prices are higher than those of the 7mm Remington Magnum and the .280 Remington, both of which have similar performance to the 7mm WSM, with the 280 Rem having slightly less muzzle energy and the 7mm Rem Mag being roughly equal.

== See also ==
- Table of handgun and rifle cartridges
