= 7mm Backcountry =

Rifle cartridge

- Type: Rifle
- Place of origin: United States

Production history
- Designed: 2024
- Manufacturer: Federal Premium Ammunition
- Produced: 2025–present

Specifications
- Parent case: .30-06 Springfield
- Case type: Rimless, bottleneck
- Bullet diameter: .284 in (7.224 mm)
- Neck diameter: .317 in (8.05 mm)
- Shoulder diameter: .4585 in (11.646 mm)
- Base diameter: .4698 in (11.93 mm)
- Rim diameter: .472 in (11.99 mm)
- Rim thickness: .049 in (1.24 mm)
- Case length: 2.417 in (61.39 mm)
- Overall length: 3.34 in (84.84 mm)
- Case capacity: 73 gr H_{2}O (4.7 cm^{3})
- Rifling twist: 1 in 8 in (203.2 mm)
- Primer type: Large rifle
- Maximum pressure (SAAMI): 80,000 psi (551 MPa)

Ballistic performance
Bullet mass/type	Velocity	Energy
155 gr (10 g) Terminal Ascent	3,300 ft/s (1,000 m/s)	3,748 ft⋅lbf (5,082 J)
195 gr (13 g) Berger	3,000 ft/s (910 m/s)	3,897 ft⋅lbf (5,284 J)
- Test barrel length: 24 in Source: Federal SAAMI

The 7mm Backcountry (abbrivated by SAAMI as 7mm BC) is a modern rifle cartridge developed to utilize a one piece steel alloy cartridge case patented as Peak Alloy case technology, which is able to withstand higher pressures than traditional brass alloys. According to Federal this case technology was developed in response to U.S. military solicitations. The objective is to obtain higher muzzle velocities from short-barreled rifles, which are lighter and easier to carry than the long rifles traditionally used for shooting at extended range. The cartridge is dimensionally similar to the .30-06 Springfield and its derivatives, particularly the .280 Remington and .280 Ackley Improved. Federal Premium Ammunition designed the cartridge to utilize long, heavy-for-caliber bullets due to their superior ballistic coefficients.

== Steel vs. brass ==
Steel is generally significantly stronger than brass; steel has tensile strengths of 400–700 MPa (58,015–101,526 psi) (or even 1,500 MPa (217,557 psi) for special high tensile grades), while brass typically has a tensile strength of 200–500 MPa (29,008–72,519 psi), highly dependent on the specific alloy and hardness (such as soft, semi-hard, or hard). Brass provides a good balance of strength and formability, while steel provides the higher strength, with stainless steel often stronger than regular brass. Brass is more flexible and corrosion-resistant, while steel provides the superior strength for structural applications. This means brass cartridge cases can be easier manipulated when handloading and will show pressure signs as a warning when the brass case nears its mechanical strength limit. When non-stainless steel is applied steel cartridge cases are exteriorly lacquered or plated to protect them against mechanical strength reducing corrosion.

=== Steel in ammunition mass-production ===
From a safety perspective, cartridge cases have to prevent catastrophic failure scenarios like; loss of primer cups from the cartridge case, rupture of the cartridge case, or excessive extraction force to remove the fired cartridge case from the chamber. Low carbon steel alloys were and are used in mass-produced military and affordable ammunition. When subjected to higher than usual pressure, like brass, these low carbon steel cases will fail earlier than cases employing steel alloys selected for higher yield and tensile strength.

== Suitable firearms ==
Bolt thrust generated by a standard, .473 in (12.0 mm) diameter case head operating at 80,000 psi (551.6 MPa) is equivalent to a .532 in (13.51 mm) case head operating at 64,000 psi (441.3 MPa). Accordingly, any rifle action compatible with existing magnum cartridges, such as the 7mm PRC or .300 PRC which have a .532 in (13.51 mm) case head and operate at 65,000 psi (448.2 MPa), is also compatible with the 7mm Backcountry. Additionally, due to differences in the mechanics of shear transfer, the steel case of the 7mm Backcountry imparts less bolt thrust than an equivalent high-pressure brass case.

== Performance ==
Federal claims that the 7mm Backcountry is "the fastest 7mm [cartridge] on the market." Early reports indicate that it approximates the performance of a 24-inch 7mm Remington Magnum with a 16-inch barrel.

Cartridge	Barrel	Bullet Type	Muzzle Velocity
.280 Remington	24-inches	175 gr Grand Slam	2,729 ft/s
.280 Ackley Improved	24-inches	175 gr Sierra SBT	2,800 ft/s
7mm PRC (Precision Rifle Cartridge)	24-inches	175 gr ELD-X	3,000 ft/s
7mm Remington Magnum	24-inches	175 gr Grand Slam	2,954 ft/s
7mm STW (Shooting Times Westerner)	24-inches	175 gr Grand Slam	3,009 ft/s
7mm RUM (Remington Ultra Magnum)	24-inches	175 gr Grand Slam	3,106 ft/s
7mm Backcountry	24-inches	175 gr Fusion Tipped	3,125 ft/s
7mm Backcountry	20-inches	175 gr Fusion Tipped	2,975 ft/s
7mm Backcountry	16-inches	175 gr Fusion Tipped	2,884 ft/s

== Handloading ==
According to early coverage by outdoor writer John Snow, the 7mm Backcountry uses propellant(s) presently unavailable for handloading, though Federal has now published load data using Alliant, Hodgdon, Ramshot, and Vihtavuori smokeless powders. These loads match the velocity claims of Federal’s factory ammunition when figures from equivalent barrel lengths are compared, and Federal describes the data as "...high-pressure loads for Peak Alloy cases only."

To guard against corrosion, Federal does not recommend reloading cases with a zinc-nickel-plated exterior; for this purpose, nickel-plated cases are preferred. Trimming, deburring, and some cleaning procedures commonly used in handloading brass cases may damage the nickel-plated steel case; and wax lubricants are recommended to minimize resizing effort. Lightly flaring the case mouth is advisable to avoid damaging the bullet during seating.

== Suppressors ==
The 7mm Backcountry produces relatively intense muzzle blast from short barrels, which encourages the use of suppressors. According to Federal engineers, "...despite the high pressures the round develops in the chamber, the pressure at the muzzle is no greater than a regular 7mm magnum round, like the 7mm PRC." Accordingly, where laws permit, the same suppressors may be used.

== Commercial perspective ==
Federal can carry their Peak Alloy case technology over to other new and existing carriages. If most other major ammunition manufacturers will develop production processes for high pressure capable cartridge cases or are prepared to pay Federal for Peak Alloy case technology licenses or cases is questionable.

The major arms and ammunition manufacturer SIG Sauer, with the .277 Fury that became SAAMI standardized in 2020, achieved ballistically similar results with a differing multiple pieces case technology. Designated as the 6.8×51mm Common Cartridge, it currently (2026) is in limited use by the US military. This multiple pieces case technology can also be carried over to other new and existing high pressure carriages.

Though employing dissimilar engineering solutions, both cartridges share the high chamber pressure (maximum average pressure, MAP) of 80,000 psi (551.6 MPa) in their respective SAAMI standards. SAAMI warns that MAP levels greater than 65,000 psi (448.2 MPa) may present an increased risk of unsafe cartridge-case or firearm rupture. Thus, it will require new cartridge-case and firearm designs that depart from traditional manufacturing practices, including the use of materials, construction methods, production lines, and other important design criteria.

The 7mm Backcountry chambering was up to 2026 not registered and hence certified by the C.I.P. that rules arms and ammunition safety in its (mainly European) member states, obstructing commercial acceptance in these countries. Until the 7mm Backcountry is officially certified by the C.I.P. standardization organization, it remains a wildcat cartridge in these countries.

== Platforms ==
Manufacturer	Model	Type	Country
Geissele	King Hunter	Bolt action rifle	United States
Weatherby	Model 307, Mark V	Bolt action rifle	United States

Christensen Arms, Fierce Firearms, Horizon Firearms, and Savage Arms in the Savage Model 110-line chamber the 7mm Backcountry in bolt action rifles.

== See also ==
- 7 mm caliber
- List of rifle cartridges
