= 5.6×57mmR =

German rimmed hunting rifle cartridge

- Type: Rifle
- Place of origin: Germany

Production history
- Designer: RWS

Specifications
- Case type: Rimmed, bottlenecked
- Bullet diameter: 5.70 mm (0.224 in)
- Neck diameter: 7.10 mm (0.280 in)
- Shoulder diameter: 10.94 mm (0.431 in)
- Base diameter: 11.94 mm (0.470 in)
- Rim diameter: 13.32 mm (0.524 in)
- Rim thickness: 1.40 mm (0.055 in)
- Case length: 56.70 mm (2.232 in)
- Overall length: 69.00 mm (2.717 in)
- Case capacity: 3.18 cm^{3} (49.1 gr H_{2}O)
- Rifling twist: 250 mm (1 in 9.84")
- Primer type: Large rifle
- Maximum pressure (C.I.P.): 440.0 MPa (63,820 psi)

The 5.6×57mmR (designated as the 6,5 × 57 R by the C.I.P.) cartridge was created by Rheinisch-Westfälische Sprengstoffwerke (RWS) in Germany for hunting small deer.

== 5.6×57mm rimless variant ==
The 5.6×57mm (designated as the 5,6 × 57 by the C.I.P.) is a rimless variant of the 5.6×57mmR. The rimmed variant was designed for break-open rifles and is almost identical to the rimless variant except for the rim.

== Ballistics ==
- Loads:
- 74 gr @ 1040 m/s (3380 ft/s)
- 60 gr @ 3700 ft/s

== See also ==
- List of rimmed cartridges
