= .300 Ruger Compact Magnum =

Rifle cartridge

- Type: Rifle
- Place of origin: USA

Production history
- Designer: Ruger
- Designed: 2007

Specifications
- Parent case: .375 Ruger
- Case type: Rimless, bottleneck
- Bullet diameter: .308 in (7.8 mm)
- Neck diameter: .340 in (8.6 mm)
- Shoulder diameter: .515 in (13.1 mm)
- Base diameter: .532 in (13.5 mm)
- Rim diameter: .532 in (13.5 mm)
- Rim thickness: .050 in (1.3 mm)
- Case length: 2.1 in (53 mm)
- Overall length: 2.825 in (71.8 mm)
- Rifling twist: 1-12" (304.8 mm)
- Primer type: Large rifle
- Maximum pressure (CIP): 63,817 psi (440.00 MPa)

The .300 Ruger Compact Magnum or .300 RCM is a rimless, short-length rifle cartridge designed for the hunting of medium-to-large-sized North American game.

It is designed to closely duplicate the performance of the historic .300 Winchester Magnum cartridge, yet to be chambered in a short length action rifle. The cartridge was designed by Hornady and Sturm Ruger in partnership and released commercially in 2008 and chambered in various Ruger rifles.

== Design & Specifications ==
The .300 Ruger Compact Magnum uses a unique case designed by Hornady and Ruger based on the powerful .375 Ruger cartridge. The case is of a rimless design having the base and rim diameter of .532 in (13.5 mm) which is the same diameter of the belt on belted magnum cases based on the .300 H&H Magnum and .375 H&H Magnum. This allows the cartridge to have a greater case capacity than a belted magnum case given cases of equal length. As Ruger intended the cartridge to be chambered in short length bolt-action rifles the case length was shortened to 2.10 in (53 mm) which is similar to the .308 Winchester and the French military 7.5x54 cartridges.

Unlike Winchester Short Magnum cartridges, the Ruger Compact Magnums share the same diameter from case head to body.

This allowed Ruger to chamber the cartridge without extensively redesigning their Ruger M77 Hawkeye rifle to adopt them to the new Ruger cartridge.

While the .300 H&H Magnum is longer than the .300 Ruger Compact Magnum, the latter cartridge has a greater case capacity than the former. This is due to the .300 H&H Magnum having a long tapered body while the .300 Ruger Compact Magnum follows modern cartridge designs in that it has very little taper and a sharper shoulder. The dimensioned drawing [source or citation needed] is of the parent case .375 Ruger.

== Performance ==
As other .300 magnums, the .300 Ruger Compact Magnum may be loaded with a wide range of bullets ranging from 130 to 220 grains. Lighter bullets such as the 150 grain may offer a very flat trajectory up to considerable hunting distances, while heavier bullets such as the 180 and 200 grain may provide high ballistic coefficients, maintaining energy at long ranges and bucking wind more effectively.

Hornady manufactures ammunition for the .300 Ruger Compact Magnum cartridge. The Hornady Superformance Ammunition drives a Hornady 180 gr (12 g) Interbond or SST bullet at 3,040 ft/s (930 m/s) and the 150 gr (9.7 g) SST bullets at 3,310 ft/s (1,010 m/s). The .300 Ruger Compact Magnum's greater case capacity, and the "short fat" cartridge efficiency lead to increases in the neighborhood of 150 fps over the H&H cartridge and is slightly slower than the .300 Winchester Magnum or .300 WSM.

== Sporting use ==
The .300 RCM is a cartridge for hunting a wide variety of big game animals in plains and mountain terrain, including all species of deer and other big game around the globe, short only to thick skinned dangerous game in Africa and Asia.

As it may be chambered in short action light and compact rifles, the .300 Ruger Compact Magnum is a recommended cartridge for hunting in difficult terrain where long shots are a common situation. However, production is limited. The cartridge is hard to find in the United States, and almost impossible in other parts of the world.

== See also ==
- Table of handgun and rifle cartridges
