= 7×61mm Sharpe & Hart =

Type of belted cartridge

7x61 Sharpe & Hart Magnum
- Type: Rifle
- Place of origin: Oakland, California, U.S.

Production history
- Designer: Philip Sharpe and Richard Hart
- Designed: 50s
- Manufacturer: Norma

Specifications
- Case type: rimless, belted
- Bullet diameter: .284 in (7.2 mm)
- Rim diameter: .532 in (13.5 mm)
- Rim thickness: .040 in (1.0 mm)
- Case length: 2.394 in (60.8 mm)
- Overall length: 3.27 in (83 mm)

Ballistic performance
Bullet mass/type	Velocity	Energy
160 gr (10 g)	3,100 ft/s (940 m/s)	3,410 ft⋅lbf (4,620 J)
139 gr (9 g) Hornady SST BT	2,800 ft/s (850 m/s)	2,419 ft⋅lbf (3,280 J)
175 gr (11 g) Hornady Spire Point Interlock	2,900 ft/s (880 m/s)	3,267 ft⋅lbf (4,429 J)
- Source(s): Hornady Handbook of Cartridge Reloading

The 7×61mm Sharpe & Hart Magnum belted cartridge (A.K.A. 7mm S&H Super) was developed by Philip B. Sharpe and Richard (Dick) Hart in the 1950s. Some articles claim it was based on the .300 H&H Magnum case, while others claim it was based on the 7x61 MAS M1907 case.

In 1953 Sharpe & Hart traveled to Scandinavia, where they developed the cartridge. Schultz & Larsen of Denmark chambered the cartridge in their bolt-action rifles. Norma manufactured commercial ammunition, but later discontinued the line. While the 7×61mm S&H proved to be popular, mostly outside of the United States, it led was overshadowed once the 7mm Remington Magnum was released. While commercial brass is no longer produced on a large scale, ammunition and cases are available from some custom manufacturers. Reloaders have a variety of bullets to choose from, and Hornady lists load data for the cartridge. Reloaders should be aware of whether their rifle does, or does not, have freebore before using load data developed with more modern components. Cases can also be formed from 7mm Remington Magnum cases.
