= Winchester Short Magnum =

Family of rifle cartridges

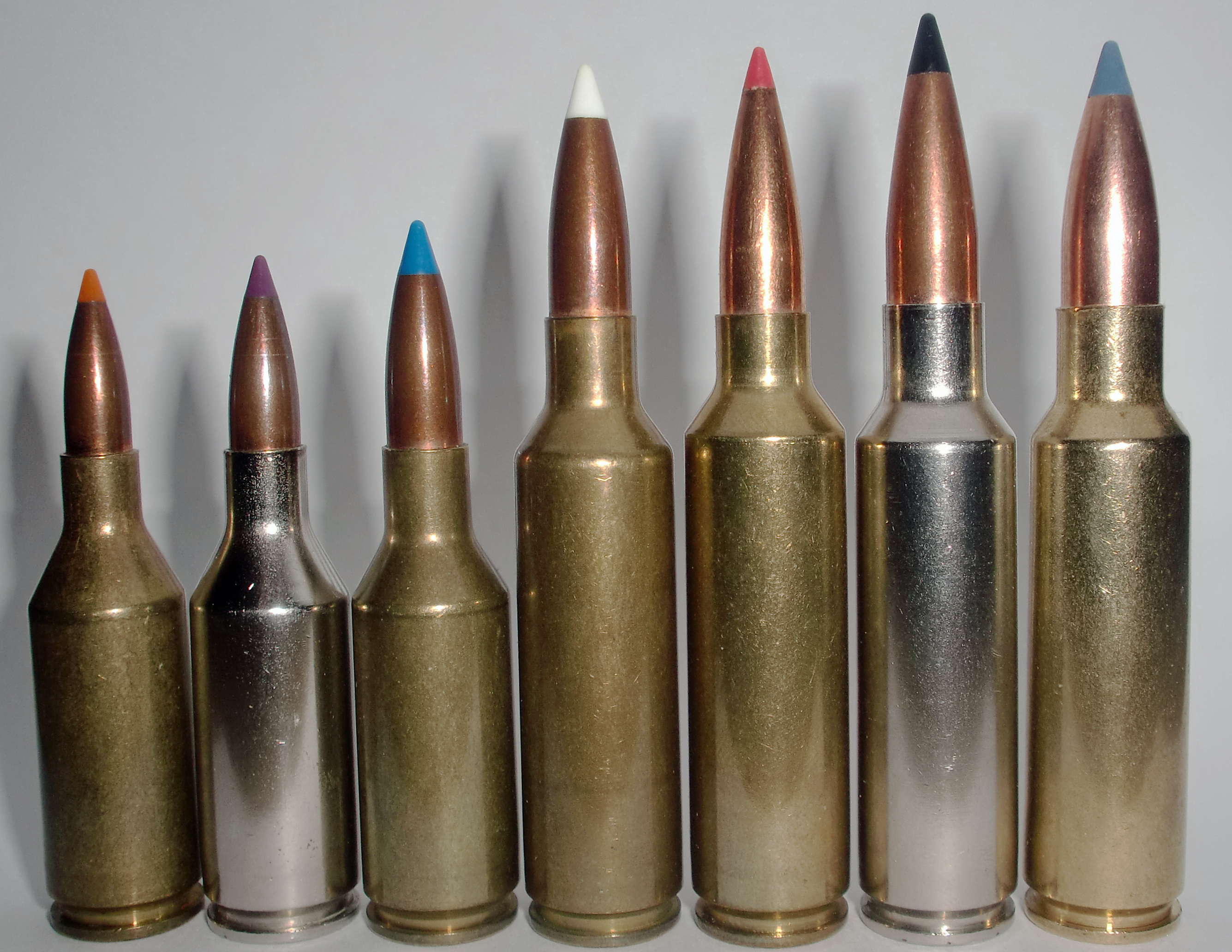
WSM and WSSM family of cartridges. From left to right: .223 WSSM, .243 WSSM, .25 WSSM, .270 WSM, 7 mm WSM, .300 WSM, .325 WSM.

Winchester Short Magnum, or WSM, refers to a family of rebated bottlenecked centerfire short magnum cartridges developed in the early 2000s by the U.S. Repeating Arms Company, the maker of Winchester rifles and one of the oldest firearms manufacturers in the United States. All of the WSM cartridges are inspired on the .404 Jeffery non-belted magnum cartridge which is shortened to fit a short rifle action (such as a .308 Winchester).

It was developed by Rick Jamison in 1997-1998 as shown in the 2003 lawsuit Jamison vs. Olin Corporation-Winchester division. Jamison was given 7 patents on the cartridge design. U.S. Repeating Arms Company used the same concept and the same base case in creating its even shorter Winchester Super Short Magnum cartridges, three of which were introduced in 2003 and 2004.

== Influences ==
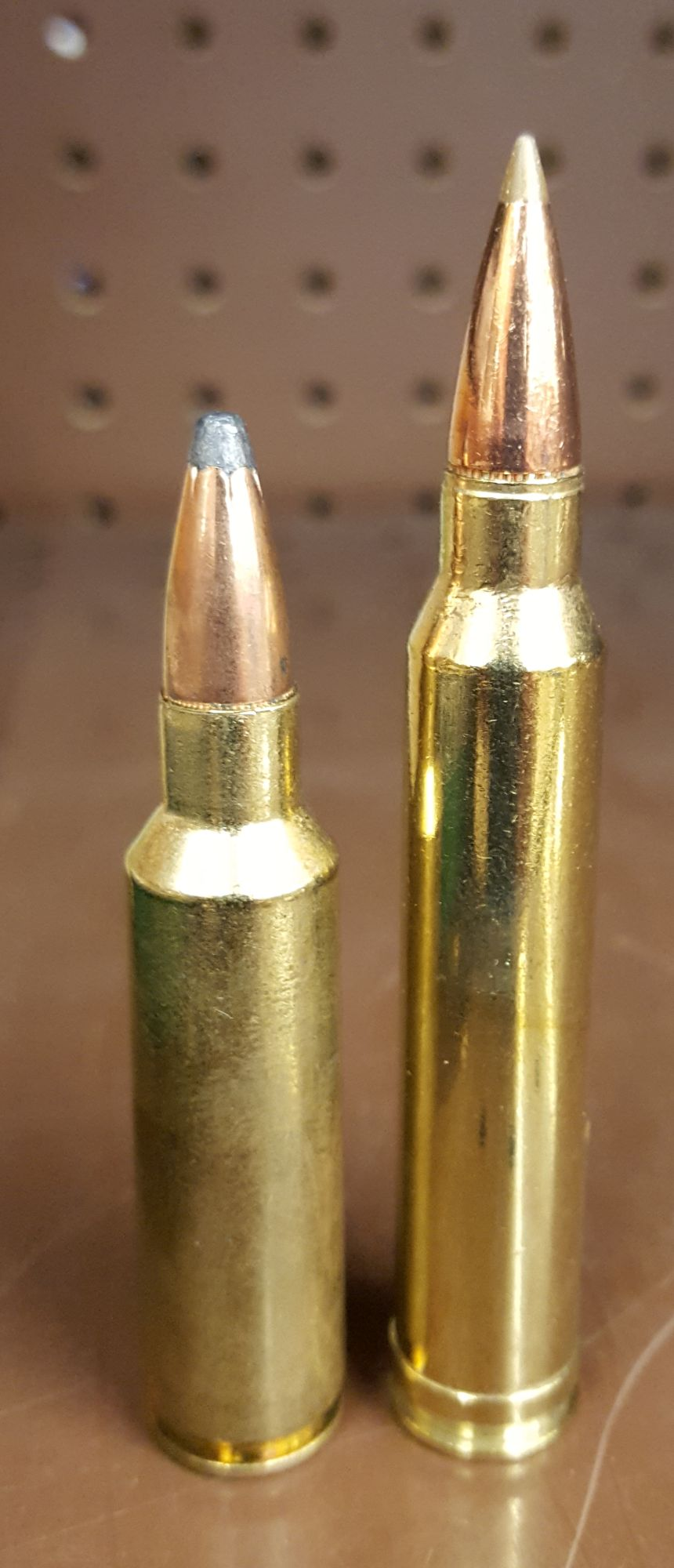
The .300 Winchester Short Magnum demonstrates the accuracy of its name when compared to the .300 Winchester Magnum.

=== 7.82 Lazzeroni Patriot ===
The WSM family was inspired partially by a family of proprietary short magnum cartridges developed in late 1997, by John Lazzeroni, derived from a previous line of magnum cartridges he had created. The first Lazzeroni short magnum, the 7.82 Lazzeroni Patriot, was designed to operate in a short-action rifle, instead of requiring a long action. The U.S. Repeating Arms Company was the first major manufacturer to commercialize Lazzeroni's concept, followed shortly thereafter by Remington with their "Short Action Ultra Mag" line.

=== 6 mm Benchrest ===
Another influence was a series of 6 mm cartridges developed for bench-rest target shooting competitions in the 1970s. The idea behind these cartridges was that a short, fat cartridge would be more "efficient" than the traditional long, narrow cartridge, as more of the powder column would be in the immediate vicinity of the primer as it detonated. In turn, this would mean that a cartridge of this type would be able to propel a bullet at speeds comparable to those of "magnum" cartridges of the same caliber using significantly less powder.

== Dimensions ==
The dimensions of the basic case are:

- Rim diameter (at base): .535 in. (13.59 mm)
- Outside diameter (at base): .555 in. (14.10 mm)
- Inside diameter (of case): .538 in. (13.67 mm)
- Maximum case length: 2.10 in. (53.34 mm)

The WSM family of cartridges are Delta L problem cartridges, meaning they can present unexpected chambering and/or feeding problems.

== Variants ==
The 300 WSM was the first of the new class of short magnums to see wide use. All of the WSM cartridges released to date have proven popular for thin-skinned game up to the size of elk and African plains game, the .325 WSM being an excellent cartridge for elk, bison and similar big game.

The cartridges in this family are, in order of development:

Name	Year of development	Bullet diameter
300 WSM	2001	.308 in. (7.823 mm)
7 mm WSM	2002	.284 in. (7.214 mm)
270 WSM	2002	.277 in. (7.036 mm)
325 WSM	2005	.323 in. (8.204 mm)

== See also ==
- List of rifle cartridges
- .300 Remington Short Action Ultra Magnum
- Winchester Super Short Magnum
