= .270 Winchester Short Magnum =

Rifle cartridge

270 Winchester Short Magnum
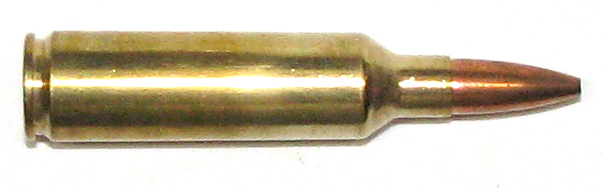
- 270 WSM cartridge
- Type: Rifle
- Place of origin: USA

Production history
- Designer: Winchester
- Designed: 2002
- Produced: 2002–present

Specifications
- Parent case: .300 WSM
- Case type: Rimless, bottleneck
- Bullet diameter: .277 in (7.0 mm)
- Land diameter: .270 in (6.9 mm)
- Neck diameter: .3140 in (7.98 mm)
- Shoulder diameter: .5381 in (13.67 mm)
- Base diameter: .5550 in (14.10 mm)
- Rim diameter: .535 in (13.6 mm)
- Rim thickness: .054 in (1.4 mm)
- Case length: 2.100 in (53.3 mm)
- Overall length: 2.860 in (72.6 mm)
- Rifling twist: 1-10"
- Primer type: Large rifle magnum
- Maximum pressure (SAAMI): 65,000 psi (450 MPa)
- Maximum pressure (C.I.P.): 63,817 psi (440.00 MPa)

Ballistic performance
Bullet mass/type	Velocity	Energy
90 gr (6 g) JHP	3,700 ft/s (1,100 m/s)	2,737 ft⋅lbf (3,711 J)
130 gr (8 g) HP	3,295 ft/s (1,004 m/s)	3,135 ft⋅lbf (4,250 J)
140 gr (9 g) SP	3,250 ft/s (990 m/s)	3,284 ft⋅lbf (4,453 J)
150 gr (10 g) SPBT	3,136 ft/s (956 m/s)	3,276 ft⋅lbf (4,442 J)
- Test barrel length: 24"; Source(s): "Shooting Times" / Accurate Powder

The 270 Winchester Short Magnum or 270 WSM is a short magnum cartridge created by necking down the .300 Winchester Short Magnum and fitting it with a .277 caliber bullet. The correct name for the cartridge, as listed by the Sporting Arms and Ammunition Manufacturers' Institute (SAAMI), is 270 WSM, without a decimal point. It is a member of the Winchester Short Magnum family of cartridges.

== Overview ==
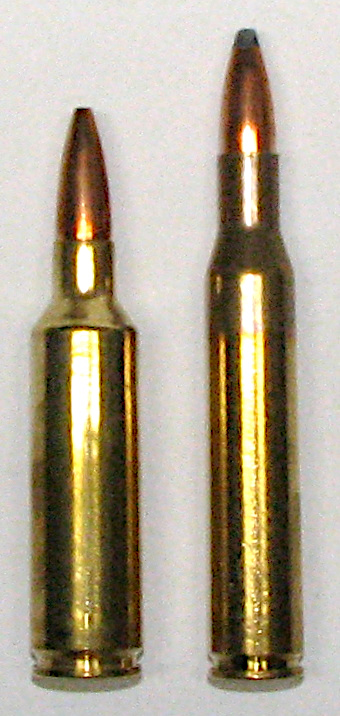
.270 WSM left, .270 Win on the right

When it was introduced, the 300 WSM sported a new case that showed a lot of promise for uses in other calibers. In 2002 Winchester introduced new cartridges in its Winchester Short Magnum family, including the 7 mm WSM and 270 WSM. This new .270 cartridge was the third commercial .270 ever produced, and the first one in 60 years.

The 270 WSM is an improvement over the older 270 Winchester providing higher velocity with bullets of the same weight, and thus a flatter trajectory and more energy. Velocities tend to be about 250 ft/s (76 m/s) faster, in a cartridge that is shorter and can therefore be used in a shorter action resulting in a more compact rifle if desired.

== Performance ==
The .270 WSM is the only cartridge of the WSM family that produces notable ballistic gains over other existing cartridges. It is the best performing short action on the market. The .300 WSM closely mimics the long-popular .300 Winchester Magnum, while the 7mm WSM matches performance of the 7mm Remington Magnum in similar barrel lengths. The .325 WSM is in a league of its own in North America as the 8 mm caliber has not become commonplace.

The .270 WSM comes quite close in performance to the legendary .270 Weatherby Magnum, with notable differences being that the .270 WSM is chambered in a short action and normally utilizes a 24" barrel whereas the older Weatherby cartridge utilizes a long action and is most commonly paired with a 26" barrel. The .270 Weatherby has a belt and the .270 WSM does not.

== See also ==
- List of rifle cartridges
- Table of handgun and rifle cartridges
- 7 mm caliber
- 6.8 Western
- Delta L problem
