= .300 H&H Magnum =

Rifle Cartridge

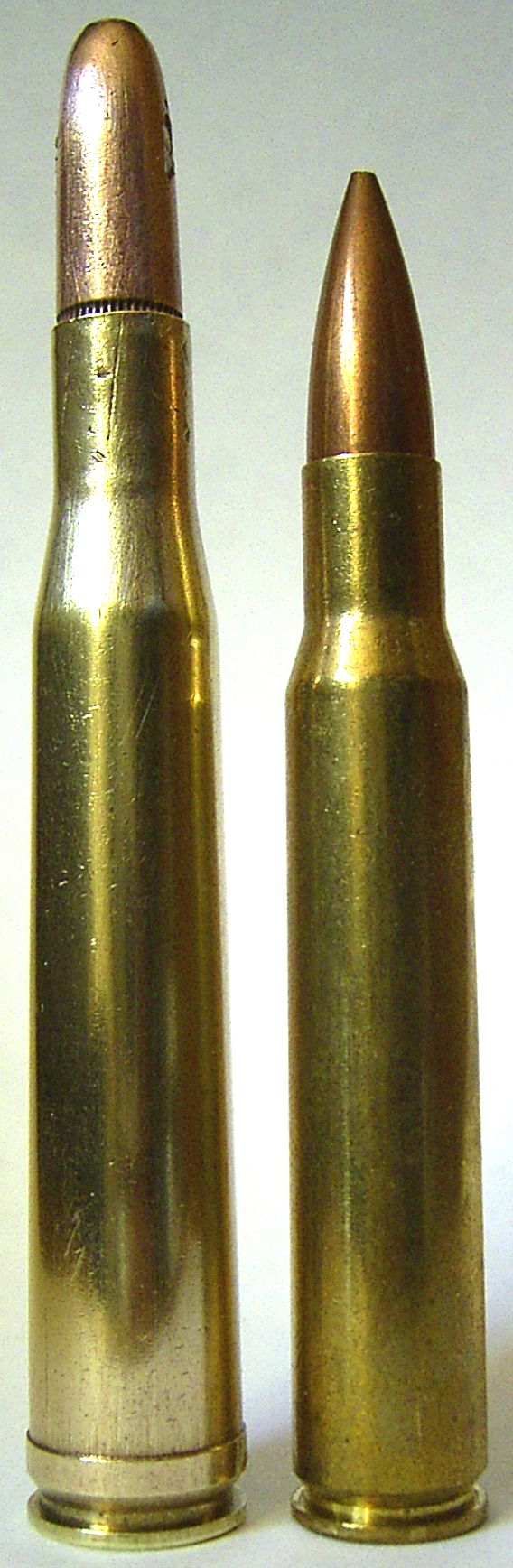
- .300 H&H Magnum (left) .30-06 Springfield (right)
- Type: Rifle
- Place of origin: United Kingdom

Production history
- Designer: Holland & Holland
- Designed: 1925
- Manufacturer: Holland & Holland
- Produced: 1925

Specifications
- Parent case: .375 H&H Magnum
- Case type: Belted, straight
- Bullet diameter: .308 in (7.8 mm)
- Neck diameter: .338 in (8.6 mm)
- Shoulder diameter: .450 in (11.4 mm)
- Base diameter: .513 in (13.0 mm)
- Rim diameter: .532 in (13.5 mm)
- Rim thickness: .220 in (5.6 mm)
- Case length: 2.850 in (72.4 mm)
- Overall length: 3.600 in (91.4 mm)
- Rifling twist: 1 in 10 in (250 mm)
- Primer type: large rifle magnum
- Maximum pressure (C.I.P.): 54,000 psi (370 MPa)
- Maximum pressure (SAAMI): 62,000 psi (430 MPa)
- Maximum CUP: 54,000 CUP

Ballistic performance
Bullet mass/type	Velocity	Energy
150 gr (10 g) GRSL	3,362 ft/s (1,025 m/s)	3,766 ft⋅lbf (5,106 J)
165 gr (11 g) SP	3,213 ft/s (979 m/s)	3,783 ft⋅lbf (5,129 J)
180 gr (12 g) SP	3,077 ft/s (938 m/s)	3,785 ft⋅lbf (5,132 J)
200 gr (13 g) HPBT	2,913 ft/s (888 m/s)	3,769 ft⋅lbf (5,110 J)
220 gr (14 g) RN	2,743 ft/s (836 m/s)	3,676 ft⋅lbf (4,984 J)
- Test barrel length: 26 in (660 mm); Source(s): Reloading data at Accurate Powder

The .300 H&H Magnum cartridge was introduced by the British company Holland & Holland as the Super-Thirty in June, 1925. The case was belted like the .375 H&H Magnum, and is based on the same case, as also is the .244 H&H Magnum. The belt is for headspace as the cases' shoulders have a narrow slope rather than an actual shoulder. More modern magnums continue this practice, but headspacing on the belt is not necessary with their more sharply angled shoulders. The cartridge was used by American shooter Ben Comfort to win the 1000-yard Wimbledon Cup Match at Camp Perry in 1935, and it was used again to win the international 1,000 yard competition in 1937. Winchester chambered the Model 70 in .300 Holland & Holland Magnum in 1937.

The cartridge offered superior ballistics to the .30-06 for long range, and the .300 H&H is almost as versatile with all bullet weights and types, especially if well-developed handloads are used. It excels with the heaviest .30-calibre bullets in the 180–220-grain range. SAAMI has set the pressure limit for this cartridge at 54,000 P.S.I. Its case length calls for a full-length magnum action, and surplus military actions chambered for the .308 Norma Magnum or the .300 Winchester Magnum offered a lower cost alternative for similar ballistics in the 1960s. The long .300 H&H case was designed for loading cordite, and those two modern magnum cartridges offered similar powder volume in a shorter case better adapted to ballistic uniformity with United States Improved Military Rifle (IMR) smokeless powder.

It has never been as popular as the .30-06; but the mystique of well-crafted rifles chambered for the .300 H&H keeps the cartridge in use despite its repeatedly reported demise. The .300 H&H is a fine African plains game cartridge, and suitable for all but the most dangerous big game and pachyderms.

As it was common for rimless hunting cartridges, a rimmed (beltless) variant, at the time called just "Holland's Super .30" and now sometimes named .30 Super Flanged H&H, was developed simultaneously for break-barrel rifles and combination guns.

== Design & Specifications ==
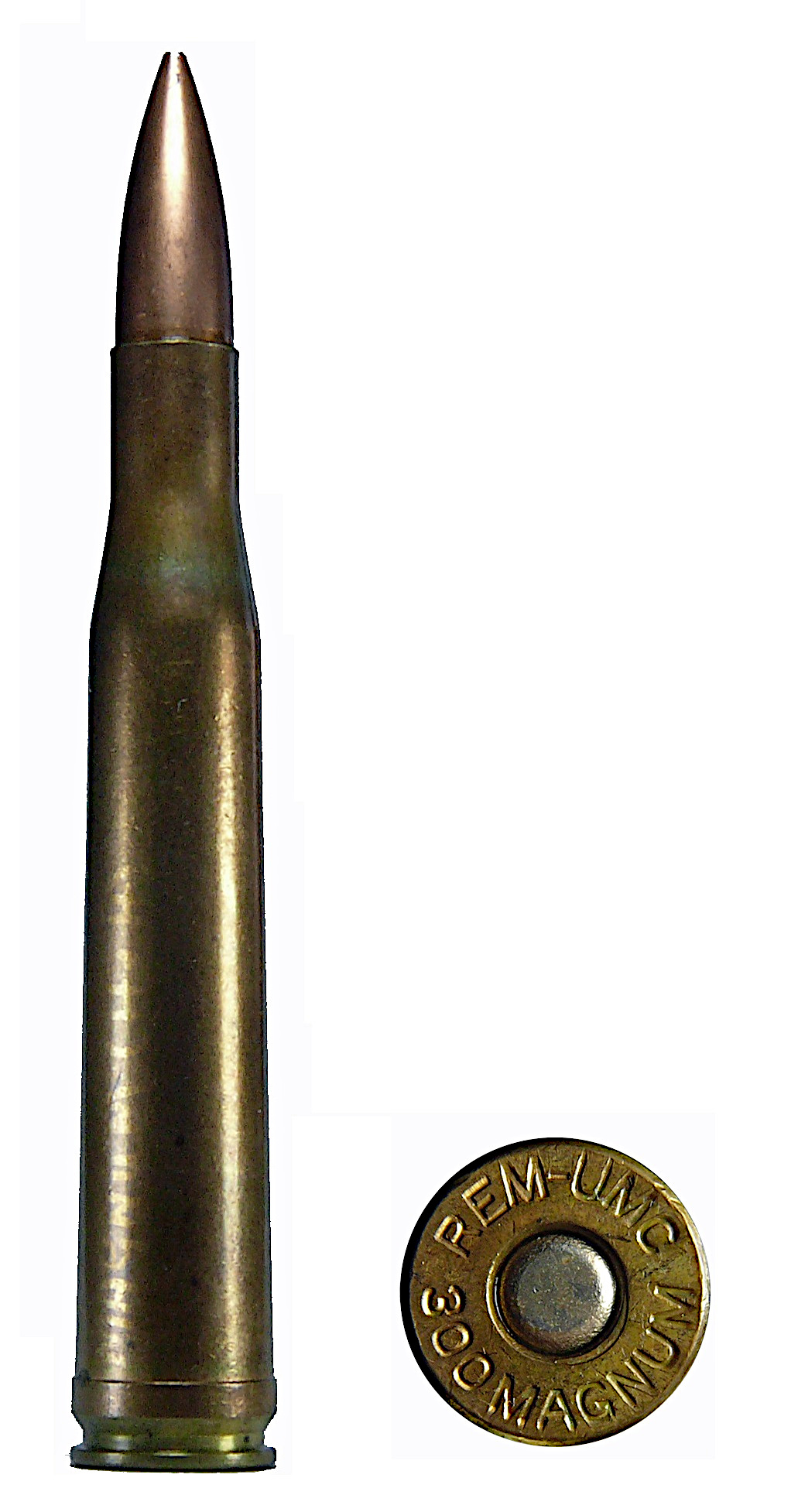
.300 H&H Magnum

The CIP treats the .300 H&H Magnum and the .30 Super Belted Rimless H&H as separate entities and provides separate entries for the cartridges. There are minute but significant variations with regard to dimensions between the two cartridges. While both cartridges are regulated by the CIP only the .300 H&H Magnum's chamber is regulated by the CIP. The CIP does not provide chamber dimensions for the .30 Super. Although cartridges are generally considered interchangeable, chambers conforming to the strict minimum chamber of the .30 Super may not be able to chamber the .300 H&H Magnum.

Both cartridges are based on .375 H&H Magnum cartridge design which provides an increase in capacity over many other cartridges. They feature tapering bodies and very shallow shoulders which prevent them from headspacing reliably on their shoulders. The belt plays a useful role in these cartridges in that it provides a demarcation point for reliable headspacing of the cartridge.

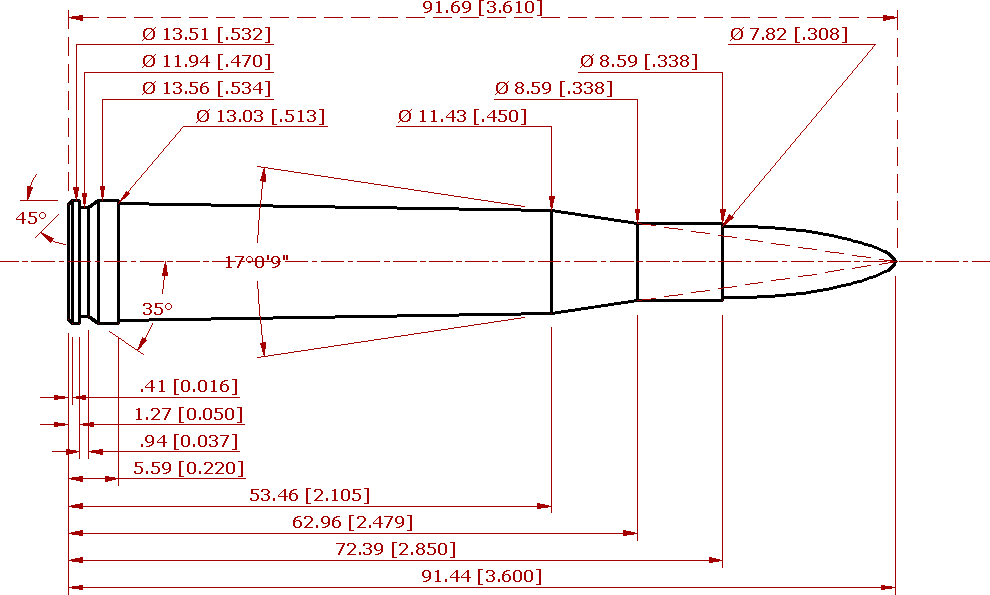
CIP compliant .300 H&H Magnum schematic diagram

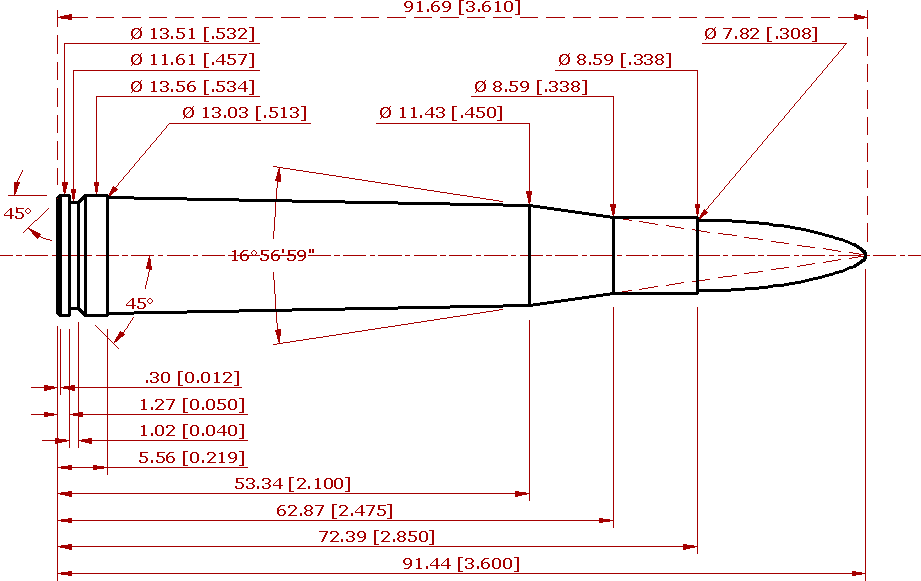
CIP compliant .30 Super schematic diagram

Cartridge Dimension and Specification Conflicts Between the .300 H&H Magnum and the .30 Super
Dimension / Specification	CIP Dimension Index	300 H&H Magnum Value	.30 Super Value
Base to shoulder length	L1	53.46 mm (2.105 in)	53.34 mm (2.100 in)
Base to neck length	L2	62.96 mm (2.479 in)	62.87 mm (2.475 in)
Height to belt	E	5.59 mm (0.220 in)	5.56 mm (0.219 in)
Extractor notch ∅	E1	11.94 mm (0.470 in)	11.61 mm (0.457 in)
Extractor notch width	e min	0.94 mm (0.037 in)	1.02 mm (0.040 in)
∠ to belt	δ	35°	45°
Shoulder ∠	α	17° 0’ 9”	16° 56’ 59”
Pressure	P_{max}	4,300 bar (62,000 psi)	3,650 bar (52,900 psi)

Significantly the shoulder vertex calculated by the CIP for both cartridges is given as 91.69 mm (3.610 in) for both cartridges. As the CIP uses the shoulder vertex length as an index to provide correct headspacing for the cartridge, this indicates that the cartridges are dimensionally interchangeable. However, as the .30 Super is rated for a lower pressure, the .300 H&H Magnum cartridge should not be fired in a .30 Super. However, the .30 Super can be discharged in a .300 H&H Magnum rifle. As most significant difference between the cartridges was that the .30 Super was loaded to a far lower pressure than the .300 H&H Magnum. The .30 Super drove a 180 gr (12 g) bullet at 2,750 ft/s (840 m/s) while the .300 H&H Magnum was loaded with the same bullet at 2,920 ft/s (890 m/s).

== See also ==
- .30-06 Springfield
- .300 Winchester Magnum
- .300 Weatherby Magnum
- .300 Winchester Short Magnum
- .300 Remington Short Action Ultra Magnum
- .300 Remington Ultra Magnum
- 7 mm caliber
- Table of handgun and rifle cartridges
- Winchester Model 70
