= Claude Saum =

American politician

Claude N. Saum (born March 16, 1875) was a lawyer and state legislator in Illinois. He was mayor of Watseka, Illinois between 1915 and 1917. As a Democrat, he was elected to the Illinois General Assembly in 1924, where he served one term.
