= .243 Winchester Super Short Magnum =

Cartridge

243 WSSM
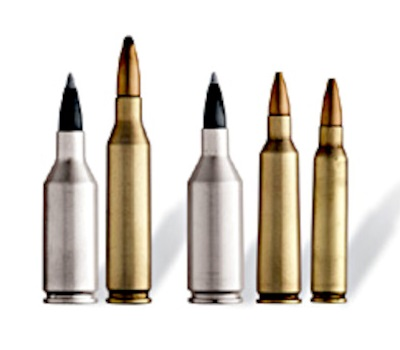
- A comparison of the .243 WSSM with .243 Winchester (second from left) and with .22-250 and .223 Remington (far right).
- Type: Rifle
- Place of origin: USA

Production history
- Designer: Browning / Winchester
- Designed: 2003
- Manufacturer: Winchester
- Produced: 2003–present

Specifications
- Parent case: .300 WSM
- Case type: Rimless, bottleneck
- Bullet diameter: .243 in (6.2 mm)
- Land diameter: .237 in (6.0 mm)
- Neck diameter: .291 in (7.4 mm)
- Shoulder diameter: .544 in (13.8 mm)
- Base diameter: .555 in (14.1 mm)
- Rim diameter: .535 in (13.6 mm)
- Rim thickness: .054 in (1.4 mm)
- Case length: 1.670 in (42.4 mm)
- Overall length: 2.362 in (60.0 mm)
- Rifling twist: 1-10 in (250 mm)
- Primer type: Large rifle

Ballistic performance
Bullet mass/type	Velocity	Energy
58 gr (4 g) VMax	4,068 ft/s (1,240 m/s)	2,132 ft⋅lbf (2,891 J)
70 gr (5 g) BT	3,707 ft/s (1,130 m/s)	2,136 ft⋅lbf (2,896 J)
80 gr (5 g) BTSP	3,545 ft/s (1,081 m/s)	2,233 ft⋅lbf (3,028 J)
90 gr (6 g) SFT	3,280 ft/s (1,000 m/s)	2,151 ft⋅lbf (2,916 J)
100 gr (6 g) BTSP	3,136 ft/s (956 m/s)	2,184 ft⋅lbf (2,961 J)
- Test barrel length: 24 in (610 mm); Source: Hodgdon

The .243 Winchester Super Short Magnum or .243 WSSM is a rifle cartridge introduced in 2003. It uses a .300 WSM (Winchester Short Magnum) case shortened and necked down to accept a .243in/6mm diameter bullet, and is a high velocity round based on ballistics design philosophies that are intended to produce a high level of efficiency. The correct name for the cartridge, as listed by the Sporting Arms and Ammunition Manufacturers' Institute (SAAMI), is 243 WSSM, without a decimal point. Winchester has discontinued the manufacture of 243 WSSM ammunition. As of the first half of 2016, Winchester/Olin did manufacture and release for sale some WSSM ammunition. The product is only manufactured periodically, often at inconsistent intervals.

== Design ==
The .243 WSSM is an addition to the Winchester Super Short Magnum (WSSM) family of cartridges, which also include the .223 WSSM and the .25 WSSM, and the idea behind the .243 WSSM was to develop a compact, higher velocity version of the well-established and internationally popular .243 Winchester unveiled by Winchester in 1955. The .243 WSSM was first introduced in 2003.

The .243 WSSM's case is unusually short and fat in profile, contrasting markedly with most other rifle cartridges, and is intended to take advantage of what ballisticians have shown is the more uniform and efficient burning of propellant powder when it is held in a short, fat stack by the cartridge case.

== Performance ==
In their ballistics tables, Winchester list a very high muzzle velocity of 4,060 ft/s (1,240 m/s) with a 55-grain (3.6 g) projectile for this cartridge. Based on Hodgdon reloading data typical velocities should range from approximately 4,000 ft/s (1,200 m/s) with a 58-grain (3.8 g) bullet to approximately 3,000 ft/s (910 m/s) with a 100-grain (6.5 g) bullet. The percentage gain in performance over the older .243 Winchester is around 10% or less.

This cartridge is usually used for small game such as varminting, and used for animals as large as deer.

== Advantages ==
Compared to other factory 6mm sporting cartridges the .243 WSSM is capable of functioning in the AR-15. Other factory produced 6mm cartridges like the .243 Win and 6mm Rem are both too long for the AR-15 and require the AR-10 platform.

The .243 WSSM is 3/8 in (9.5 mm) shorter than the .243 Win, giving the .243 WSSM the ability to fit in a super-short action rifle. Thus .243 WSSM rifles can be lighter, have stiffer actions and have faster actions to cycle.

The .243 WSSM gives generally a 10% increase in velocity over the .243 Win.

== See also ==
- 6 mm caliber
- List of rifle cartridges
- Table of handgun and rifle cartridges
