= .223 Winchester Super Short Magnum =

Rifle cartridge

.223 WSSM
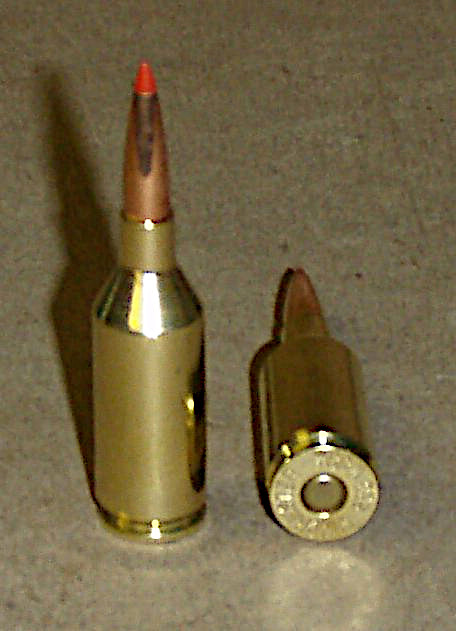
- .223 WSSM with 75 gr (4.9 g) Hornady AMax bullet
- Type: Rifle
- Place of origin: United States

Production history
- Designer: Browning & Winchester
- Designed: 2002
- Manufacturer: Winchester
- Produced: 2003–present

Specifications
- Parent case: .300 WSM
- Case type: Rimless, bottleneck
- Bullet diameter: .223 in (5.7 mm)
- Neck diameter: .272 in (6.9 mm)
- Shoulder diameter: .544 in (13.8 mm)
- Base diameter: .555 in (14.1 mm)
- Rim diameter: .535 in (13.6 mm)
- Rim thickness: .054 in (1.4 mm)
- Case length: 1.670 in (42.4 mm)
- Overall length: 2.362 in (60.0 mm)
- Rifling twist: 1-7 in (180 mm) to 1-9 in (230 mm)
- Primer type: Large rifle

Ballistic performance
Bullet mass/type	Velocity	Energy
40 gr (3 g) BT (boat-tailed)	4,352 ft/s (1,326 m/s)	1,683 ft⋅lbf (2,282 J)
60 gr (4 g) JSP	3,733 ft/s (1,138 m/s)	1,857 ft⋅lbf (2,518 J)
75 gr (5 g) BT (boat-tailed)	3,378 ft/s (1,030 m/s)	1,901 ft⋅lbf (2,577 J)
- Test barrel length: 24 in (610 mm); Source(s): Hodgdon

The .223 WSSM (Winchester Super Short Magnum, 5.56×42mm) is a .223 caliber rifle cartridge created by Winchester and Browning based on a shortened version of the Winchester Short Magnum case.

== History ==
The .223 WSSM was introduced in 2003 by the Browning Arms Company, Winchester Ammunition, and Winchester Repeating Arms Company. The .223 designation is a reference to the popular .223 Remington. It is currently the fastest production .22 caliber round in the world with muzzle velocities as high as 4,600 feet per second (1,402 meters per second). However, the .220 Swift still holds the record as the fastest .22 caliber centerfire cartridge with a published velocity of 4,665 ft/s (1,422 m/s) using a 29-grain (1.9 g) projectile and 42 grains (2.7 g) of 3031 powder.

== Complaints ==
Even before the cartridge was commercially introduced, it was claimed that it would be extremely hard on barrels and high wear would lead to short barrel life. Another criticism is that, although the round is suited for long range varmint hunting, it is not good for medium game any further than 200 yards.

The Winchester made Model 70 in .223 WSSM has not been revived in the new Browning-made Winchester Model 70s, but Browning has chosen to use chrome-lined barrels on all of its guns chambered for .223 WSSM and has introduced the .223 WSSM cartridge as a chambering in its A-bolt rifles. Browning rejects the charge that the .223 WSSM round is especially hard on barrels: "The 223 and 243 WSSM cartridges are said to 'burn up' barrels in as little as 300 rounds. Nothing could be further from the truth."

== Advantages ==
According to Browning, the .223 WSSM offers a 600 ft/s (180 m/s) gain with a 55 gr (3.6 g) bullet over the standard .223 Rem. It also offers a 440 ft/s (130 m/s) gain over the .22-250, a popular varmint round. This comes out to a 600 ft⋅lbf (810 J) gain over a standard .223 Rem, and a 350 ft⋅lbf (470 J) gain over the .22-250.

== See also ==
- .22 Eargesplitten Loudenboomer
- Winchester Super Short Magnum
- 5.6×57mm
- List of rifle cartridges
- Table of handgun and rifle cartridges
- 5 mm/35 SMc
- 5 mm caliber
- .223 Remington
