= .300 Remington Short Action Ultra Magnum =

Rifle cartridge

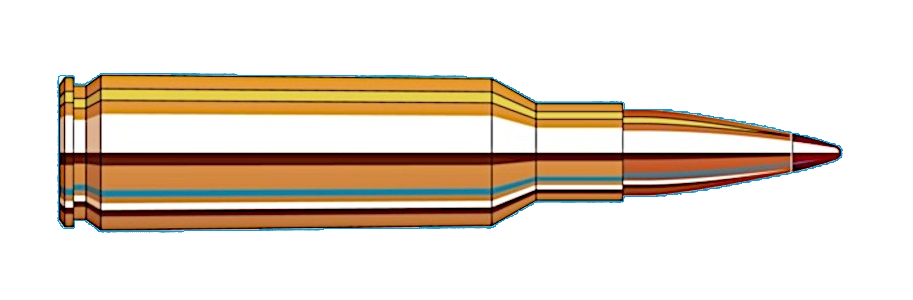
- Type: Rifle
- Place of origin: USA

Production history
- Designer: Remington
- Manufacturer: Remington
- Produced: 2001

Specifications
- Parent case: .300 Remington Ultra Magnum
- Case type: rimless bottleneck
- Bullet diameter: .308 in (7.8 mm)
- Neck diameter: .344 in (8.7 mm)
- Shoulder diameter: .534 in (13.6 mm)
- Base diameter: .550 in (14.0 mm)
- Rim diameter: .534 in (13.6 mm)
- Case length: 2.015 in (51.2 mm)
- Overall length: 2.825 in (71.8 mm)
- Rifling twist: 1-10 in (250 mm)
- Primer type: Large rifle magnum
- Maximum pressure (SAAMI): 65,000 psi (450 MPa)

Ballistic performance
Bullet mass/type	Velocity	Energy
150 gr (10 g) SP	3,253 ft/s (992 m/s)	3,525 ft⋅lbf (4,779 J)
165 gr (11 g) SPBT	3,126 ft/s (953 m/s)	3,581 ft⋅lbf (4,855 J)
180 gr (12 g) HPBT	2,954 ft/s (900 m/s)	3,489 ft⋅lbf (4,730 J)
200 gr (13 g) SP	2,790 ft/s (850 m/s)	3,458 ft⋅lbf (4,688 J)
- Test barrel length: 24 in (610 mm); Source(s): Reloading data at Accurate Powder

.300 Remington Short Action Ultra Magnum (also known as 300 RSAUM, 300 RSUM or 300 Rem SAUM) is a .30 caliber short magnum cartridge that is a shortened version of the Remington 300 Ultra Mag, both of which derive from the .404 Jeffery case. The Remington Short Ultra Mag was put on the market shortly after Winchester released its 300 WSM round in 2001, resulting in the Winchester product getting the marketing advantage that has eclipsed the Remington offering.

== Performance ==
The 300 RSAUM's ballistics are similar to 300 Win Mag and 300 WSM. The difference in ballistics between the WSM and RSAUM are insignificant in all practical applications. Differences in muzzle velocity and muzzle energy are related to barrel length rather than case dimension.

=== Muzzle velocity ===
- 10.69 g (165 gr) full metal jacket (FMJ): 3,075 ft/s
- 11.66 g (180 gr) FMJ: 2,960 ft/s

== Comparisons ==
- The WSM has slightly more case capacity and thus, slightly more velocity
- The WSM is more popular and more ammo and handloading data are available

.300 RSAUM performance comparisons
Cartridge	Bullet weight	Muzzle velocity	Muzzle energy
.30-06 Springfield	200	2,569	2,932
.300 RSAUM	200	2,790	3,458
.300 WSM	200	2,822	3,538
.300 Win Mag	200	2,877	3,677
.300 H&H Magnum	200	2,913	3,769
.300 Wby Mag	200	2,987	3,963
.300 RUM	200	3,154	4,419

== See also ==
- .300 Remington Ultra Magnum
- 7 mm caliber
- List of firearms
- List of rifle cartridges
- Table of handgun and rifle cartridges
- List of individual weapons of the U.S. Armed Forces
