= .300 Winchester Short Magnum =

Centerfire rifle cartridge developed by Winchester

300 Winchester Short Magnum
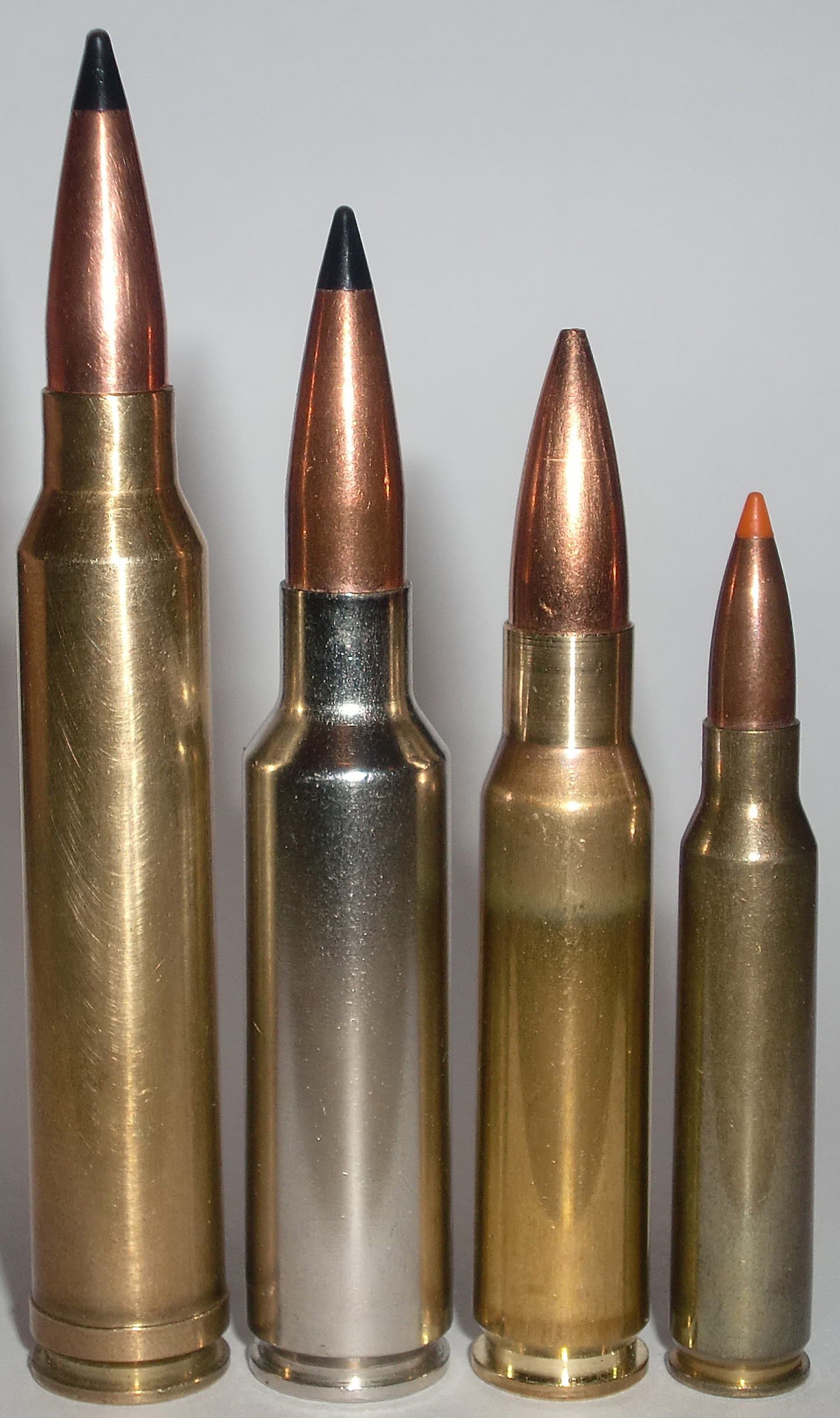
- From left to right: .300 Winchester Magnum, 300 WSM, .308 Winchester, .223 Remington
- Type: Rifle
- Place of origin: United States

Production history
- Designer: Winchester
- Designed: 2001
- Manufacturer: Winchester
- Produced: 2001–present

Specifications
- Case type: Rebated-rimmed, bottleneck
- Bullet diameter: .308 in (7.8 mm)
- Land diameter: .300 in (7.6 mm)
- Neck diameter: .344 in (8.7 mm)
- Shoulder diameter: .538 in (13.7 mm)
- Base diameter: .555 in (14.1 mm)
- Rim diameter: .535 in (13.6 mm)
- Case length: 2.100 in (53.3 mm)
- Overall length: 2.860 in (72.6 mm)
- Case capacity: 80.4 gr
- Rifling twist: 1-10"
- Primer type: Large rifle magnum
- Maximum pressure (C.I.P.): 63,817 psi (440.00 MPa)

Ballistic performance
Bullet mass/type	Velocity	Energy
150 gr (10 g) SP	3,313 ft/s (1,010 m/s)	3,657 ft⋅lbf (4,958 J)
165 gr (11 g) HP	3,223 ft/s (982 m/s)	3,807 ft⋅lbf (5,162 J)
180 gr (12 g) HP	3,095 ft/s (943 m/s)	3,830 ft⋅lbf (5,190 J)
200 gr (13 g) SP	2,822 ft/s (860 m/s)	3,538 ft⋅lbf (4,797 J)
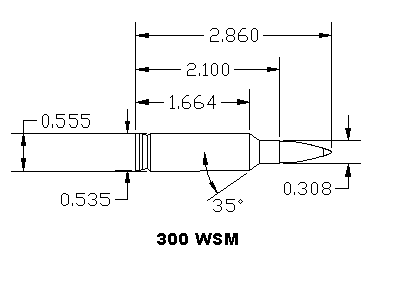
- Test barrel length: 24"; Source: Reloading data at Accurate Powder Measured Drawing, 300 WSM

300 Winchester Short Magnum (also known as 300 WSM) is a .30 caliber rebated rim bottlenecked centerfire short magnum cartridge that was introduced in 2001 by Winchester.

== Specifications ==
The overall cartridge length is 72.6 mm. The cartridge case length is 53.34 mm. The bullet diameter is .308 in (7.62 mm), which is common to U.S. .30 caliber cartridges. The principle at work in the short magnum cartridge is the fitting of larger volumes of powder in closer proximity to the primer's flash hole, resulting in more-uniform ignition, thereby generating essentially the same ballistic performance as long-action magnums with less powder, and less recoil. The .300 WSM has a case capacity of 80 grains. The .30-06 Springfield holds 69 grains; .308 Winchester holds 56 grains; .30-30 Winchester holds 45 grains; .300 Winchester Magnum has a case capacity of 93.8 grains. While providing ballistic performance nearly identical to that of the .300 Winchester Magnum, 300 WSM does this with about 14 grains less powder. The .300 WSM also head-spaces off of the case shoulder, versus the older .300 Winchester Magnum's belted head space design.

The advantage to this round is the ballistic performance is nearly identical to the .300 Winchester Magnum in a lighter rifle with a shorter action burning 8 - 10% less gunpowder. A disadvantage of cartridge case designs with relatively large case head diameters lies in relatively high bolt thrust levels exerted on the locking mechanism of the employed firearm. Also, in small ring actions the larger chamber diameter removes more steel from the barrel tenon, making it weaker radially. The short, squat design of the cartridge also can cause feeding issues, especially in rifles whose magazine follower isn't at a very specific angle, leading to rounds not being properly fed out of the magazine and engaged by the bolt carrier.

== Use ==
The .300 WSM is adequate for hunting all types of big game in North America including (but not limited to): moose, black bear, brown bear, elk, black-tailed deer, mule deer, and white-tailed deer in forests and plains where long range, flat shots are necessary. The .300 WSM is also used in benchrest shooting, in 2021 a .300 WSM was used to break the world record for best 10-shot grouping at 1,000 yards at a benchrest competition in Texas.

The .300 WSM has a standard bullet diameter of .308 in (7.62 mm) and takes advantage of the numerous bullet options available in that caliber.

== Warnings ==
The 300 WSM is a Delta L problem cartridge, meaning it can present unexpected chambering and/or feeding problems. The Delta L problem article explains this problem in more detail. The .300 Remington Short Action Ultra Magnum has very similar cartridge dimensions but is not interchangeable.

=== Muzzle velocity ===
- 165 gr (10.69 g) Full Metal Jacket (FMJ): 3,223 ft/s (982 m/s)
- 180 gr (11.66 g) Full Metal Jacket (FMJ): 3,095 ft/s (943 m/s)
  - Muzzle velocity varies slightly between individual loads and bullet types.

== Comparison ==
300 WSM performance comparisons
Cartridge	Bullet Weight (gr)	Muzzle velocity (fps)	Muzzle energy (Ft-lbs)
300 WSM	200	2822	3536
.300 RSAUM	200	2790	3456
.300 Win Mag	200	2850	3607
.300 Wby Mag	200	3060	4158
.300 RUM	200	3154	4417
.30-06 Springfield	200	2569	2930

== Legacy ==
Of all the short magnums that came out in the 2000s decade the .300 WSM, along with the .270 WSM, are one of the few that have stood the test of time and still have rifles being made for them as of 2025. Both Remington and Ruger no longer manufacture rifles chambered for their proprietary Remington Short Action Ultra Magnum and Ruger Compact Magnum cartridges, although ammunition is still available for them albeit with a limited selection. Among Winchester's short magnums, rifles chambered for the 7mm WSM are no longer made, and the .325 WSM has a limited current production from Winchester. However both the .270 WSM and .300 WSM can be found in a variety of models from major firearms manufacturers including: Remington's Model 700 CDL SF, SPS & SPS Stainless; Savage's Model 110 Apex Hunter, Apex Storm, Long Range Hunter, & High Country; and Winchester's Model 70 Classic Featherweight, Extreme Timber, Extreme Tungsten, Extreme Weather, Long Range & Super Grade; all of which are still chambered for the .270 WSM and .300 WSM.

== See also ==
- .300 Remington Short Action Ultra Magnum
- .300 Winchester Magnum
- .300 Ruger Compact Magnum
- Winchester Short Magnum
- List of firearms
- List of rifle cartridges
- Table of handgun and rifle cartridges
- List of individual weapons of the U.S. Armed Forces
- 7 mm caliber
- Delta L problem
