= Small arms ammunition pressure testing =

Testing of chamber pressure

Small arms ammunition pressure testing is used to establish standards for maximum average peak pressures of chamberings, as well as determining the safety of particular loads for the purposes of new load development. In metallic cartridges, peak pressure can vary based on propellant used, primers used, charge weight, projectile type, projectile seating depth, neck tension, chamber throat/lead parameters. In shotshells, the primary factors are charge weight, projectile weight, wad type, hull construction, and crimp quality.

== Modern civilian test methodologies ==
The two modern standardized test methodologies in use are the Commission Internationale Permanente pour l'Epreuve des Armes à Feu Portatives or C.I.P. methodology, and the Sporting Arms and Ammunition Manufacturers' Institute or SAAMI methodology. The SAAMI methodology is widely used in the United States, while C.I.P. is widely used in European C.I.P. member states. While both modern methodologies use piezo pressure transducer sensors to generate pressure readings, differences in the test setup mean that the same pressures will often generate very different readings depending on the method used.

Because C.I.P. and SAAMI maximum pressures are measured differently, it is important to know which methodology was used to measure peak pressures. While C.I.P. pressures are often quoted in megapascals in Wikipedia and bars by C.I.P., and SAAMI in psi, it is not unusual to see C.I.P. pressures converted to psi or vice versa.

=== C.I.P. method ===
C.I.P. uses a drilled case to expose the pressure transducer directly to propellant gases. The piezo measuring device (transducer) is positioned at a distance of 25 millimetres (0.98 in) from the breech face when the length of the cartridge case permits that, including limits. When the length of the cartridge case is too short, pressure measurement will take place at a chambering specific defined shorter distance from the breech face depending on the dimensions of the case. The defined distance for a particular chambering is published in the TDCC data sheet of the chambering.

In a rifle cartridge case like the .308 Winchester, the TDCC M = 25.00 value denotes the transducer must be positioned at a distance of 25 millimetres (0.98 in) from the breech face.
In a relatively short pistol cartridge case like the 9×19mm Parabellum (9mm Luger in C.I.P. nomenclature), the TDCC M = 12.50 value denotes the transducer must be positioned at a distance of 12.5 millimetres (0.49 in) from the breech face.

Some have incorrectly concluded that C.I.P. measures pressure at the case mouth to account for the variations from SAAMI pressure.

C.I.P. almost exclusively uses one type of piezoelectric sensor (called a "channel sensor") made by the Swiss company Kistler that requires drilling of the cartridge case before firing the proofing cartridge in a specially made test barrel. The Kistler ballistic pressure measurement sensor 6215 has a maximum working pressure of 600 MPa (87,023 psi) and is mounted recessed inside the cartridge case (the face of high-pressure sensor does not contact the cartridge case) and requires that the test cartridge case have a hole drilled in it prior to testing. The test cartridge must be inserted into the chamber in such a way that the hole in the test cartridge case lines up with a gas port hole that channels the gas pressure from the cartridge case to the face of the sensor. The measurement accuracy of the pressure measurements with 21st century high-pressure sensors is expected to be ≤ 2%.

=== SAAMI method ===
SAAMI pressure testing protocol uses a conformal piezoelectric quartz transducer for pressure testing of centerfire pistol and revolver, centerfire rifle, and rimfire cartridges. The primary source of the conformal transducers is the US company PCB Piezotronics. The SAAMI pressure testing protocol uses test barrels that have a hole located in the chamber at a location specific to the cartridge. The SAAMI conformal transducer is fitted into a hole that penetrates the test barrel chamber in such a way that the transducer's face, precision machined to match curvature of the chamber wall at the mounting location a specific distance from the breech face, functions as part of the chamber wall. When the cartridge is fired the gas pressure causes the cartridge case to expand, contacting the chamber walls. The portion of the cartridge case in contact with the face of the conformal transducer exerts a pressure on the transducer which in turn generates a minute electronic impulse that is amplified and results in a reading in pounds per square inch (psi). The SAAMI conformal transducer has the benefit of not requiring a drilled cartridge case and the corresponding challenges of inserting and alignment required of drilled cartridge case. Instead it requires a simple pressure test of a sample case from the lot of cartridge cases being used in the test ammunition. This pressure test determines the gas pressure required to cause the case to expand and come in contact with the face of the conformal transducer upon firing. This measurement is referred to as the "offset" and makes allowance for the "loss" of that gas pressure prior to the cartridge case coming in contact with the transducer and generating the impulse. The offset is added to the pressure reading to arrive at the peak pressure reading. Other benefits of the SAAMI conformal transducer are: very adaptive to the high volume quality control testing demands of commercial and law enforcement ammunition production; protection of the transducer from direct exposure to the high temperature combustion gases and hence a comparatively long service life; 80,000 psi (551.6 MPa) maximum working pressure. Cartridges with the same chamber wall diameter at the mounting point of the transducer and which operate within specific chamber pressure limits may use the same transducer interchangeably reducing instrumentation costs.

=== Shotshell ammunition method ===
For shotshell ammunition, the technical variations are easier to solve since only one type of piezoelectric sensor (called "tangential sensor") is available from the PCB Piezotronics and Kistler International companies to be used without drilling without variations amongst SAAMI guidelines and C.I.P. rulings.

=== External stress gauge ===
A low cost method of gathering pressure data uses a resistive stress gauge attached to the exterior of the chamber. These systems are usually calibrated to emulate the results of an existing standardized system such as the SAAMI system, so that the results will be directly comparable. Because this system does not require a specialized test barrel, only a firearm that has an accessible external chamber wall, it is much lower cost.

== Military test methodologies ==
=== NATO EPVAT ===
NATO defines 5.56mm, 7.62mm, 9mm, and 12.7mm using the NATO EPVAT test methods, which includes pressure testing. Unlike the civilian testing methods NATO EPVAT testing procedures for the "NATO rifle chamberings" require the pressure sensor or transducer to be mounted ahead of the case mouth. The advantage of this mounting position is that there is no need to drill the cartridge case to mount the transducer. Drilling prior to firing is always a time-consuming process (fast quality control and feedback to production is essential during the ammunition manufacturing process). The disadvantage of this mount is that the pressure rises much faster than in a drilled cartridge case. This causes high frequency oscillations of the pressure sensor (approx 200 kHz for a Kistler 6215 transducer) and this requires electronic filtering with the drawback that filtering also affects the lower harmonics where a peak is found causing a slight error in the measurement. This slight error is not always well mastered and this causes a lot of discussion about the filter order, cutoff frequency and its type (Bessel or Butterworth).

For NATO EPVAT testing of military firearms ammunition NATO design EPVAT test barrels with Kistler 6215 channel sensor transducers are used. Other transducers meeting CIP standards are also acceptable, at least for Ministry of Defence of the United Kingdom in 2005.

=== US military SCATP ===
The United States Armed Forces, however, defines test procedures for 5.56mm NATO in SCATP-5.56, 7.62mm NATO in SCATP-7.62, and .45 ACP in SCATP-45. These procedures are based on the SAAMI test methodology.

== See also ==
- Chamber pressure
- Copper units of pressure
