= .223 Remington =

Firearms cartridge

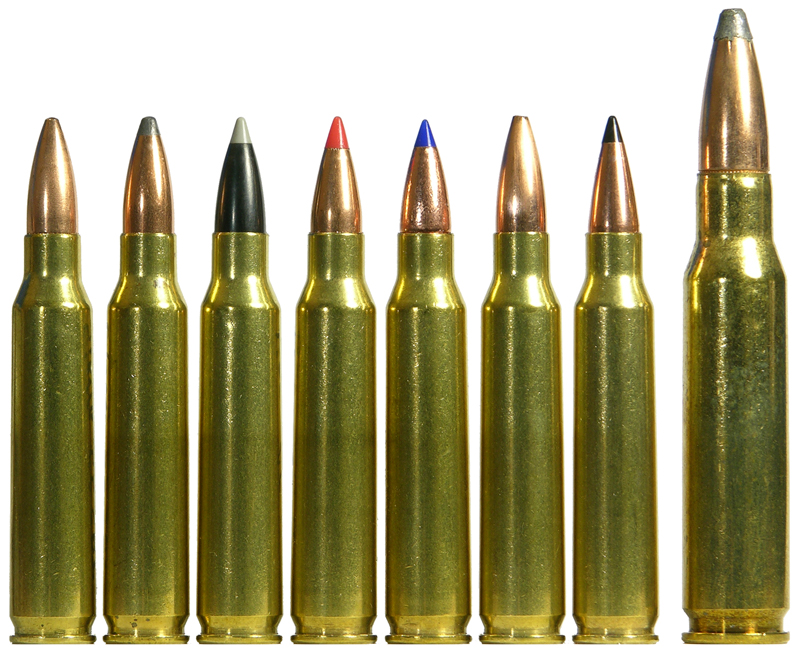
- A variety of .223 Remington cartridges with a .308 Winchester (right) for comparison
- Type: Rifle
- Place of origin: United States

Production history
- Designer: Remington Arms
- Designed: 1962
- Produced: 1964–present
- Variants: 5.56×45mm NATO

Specifications
- Parent case: .222 Remington
- Case type: Rimless, bottleneck
- Bullet diameter: .2245 in (5.70 mm)
- Land diameter: .219 in (5.56 mm)
- Neck diameter: .253 in (6.43 mm)
- Shoulder diameter: .3542 in (9.00 mm)
- Base diameter: .3759 in (9.55 mm)
- Rim diameter: .378 in (9.60 mm)
- Rim thickness: .045 in (1.14 mm)
- Case length: 1.760 in (44.70 mm)
- Overall length: 2.260 in (57.40 mm)
- Case capacity: 28.8 grain H_{2}O (1.87 ml)
- Rifling twist: 1 in 12 in (305 mm) (military-style rifles use 1 in 7 in (178 mm) to 1 in 10 in (254 mm) to stabilize longer bullets)
- Primer type: Small rifle
- Maximum pressure (SAAMI): 55,000 psi (380 MPa)
- Maximum pressure (CIP): 62,366 psi (430.00 MPa)
- Maximum CUP: 52000 CUP

Ballistic performance
Bullet mass/type	Velocity	Energy
55 gr (4 g) Nosler ballistic tip	3,240 ft/s (990 m/s)	1,265 ft⋅lbf (1,715 J)
60 gr (4 g) Nosler partition	3,160 ft/s (960 m/s)	1,325 ft⋅lbf (1,796 J)
69 gr (4 g) BTHP	2,950 ft/s (900 m/s)	1,338 ft⋅lbf (1,814 J)
77 gr (5 g) BTHP	2,750 ft/s (840 m/s)	1,301 ft⋅lbf (1,764 J)
- Test barrel length: 24 inches (61 cm); Source

The .223 Remington, also known as 223 Remington by SAAMI and 223 Rem. by the C.I.P., (pronounced "two-two-three") is a rimless, bottlenecked, centerfire intermediate cartridge. It was developed in 1957 by Remington Arms and Fairchild Industries for the U.S. Continental Army Command of the United States Army as part of a project to create a small-caliber, high-velocity firearm. Firing a .2245 in (5.70 mm) projectile, the .223 Remington is considered one of the most popular common-use cartridges and is used by a wide range of semi-automatic and manual-action rifles.

== History ==
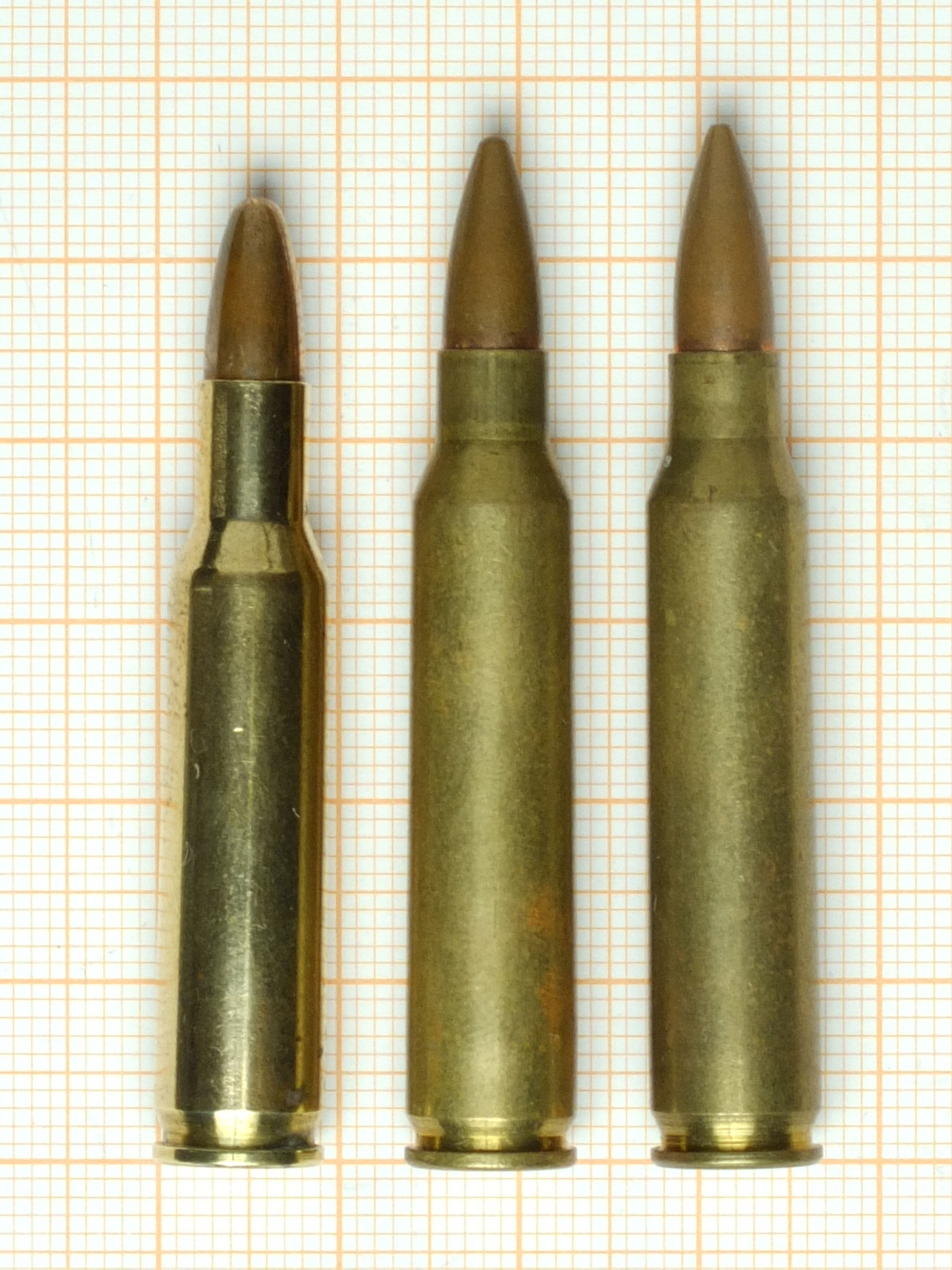
From left: .222 Remington, .223 Remington, and 5.56×45mm NATO

=== Development ===
The development of the cartridge, which eventually became the .223 Remington, was linked to the creation of a new small-caliber, high-velocity (SCHV) combat rifle. Work on a rifle and cartridge to meet the requirements of the U.S. Continental Army Command (CONARC) began in 1957. Fairchild Industries, Remington Arms, Winchester, and several engineers (including Eugene Stoner of ArmaLite, who was invited to scale down the AR-10 (7.62×51mm NATO) design), contributed.

CONARC ordered rifles to test. Stoner and Sierra Bullet's Frank Snow began work on the .222 Remington cartridge. Using a ballistic calculator, they determined that a 55-grain bullet would have to be fired at 3,300 ft/s to achieve the 500-yard performance necessary.

Robert Hutton (technical editor of Guns and Ammo magazine) started the development of a powder load to reach the 3,300 ft/s goal. He used DuPont IMR4198, IMR3031, and an Olin powder to work up loads. Testing was done with a Remington 722 rifle with a 22" Apex barrel.

During a public demonstration, the round successfully penetrated the US steel helmet as required, but testing also showed chamber pressures to be too high.

Stoner contacted both Winchester and Remington about increasing the case capacity. Remington created a larger cartridge called the .222 Special. This cartridge is loaded with DuPont IMR4475 powder.

=== Testing and military trials ===
During parallel testing of the T44E4 (future M14) and the ArmaLite AR-15 in 1958, the T44E4 experienced 16 failures per 1,000 rounds fired compared to 6.1 for the ArmaLite AR-15. Because of several different .222 caliber cartridges that were being developed for the SCHV project, the .222 Special was renamed .223 Remington. In May 1959, a report was produced stating that five- to seven-man squads armed with ArmaLite AR-15 rifles have a higher hit probability than 11-man squads armed with the M14 rifle. At an Independence Day picnic, Air Force General Curtis LeMay tested the ArmaLite AR-15 and was very impressed with it. He ordered a number of them to replace M2 carbines that were in use by the Air Force. In November of that year, testing at Aberdeen Proving Ground showed the ArmaLite AR-15 failure rate had declined to 2.5/1,000, resulting in the ArmaLite AR-15 being approved for more extensive trials.

=== Adoption and standardization ===
In 1961, marksmanship testing compared the AR-15 and M14; 43% of ArmaLite AR-15 shooters achieved Expert, while only 22% of M14 rifle shooters did. Le May ordered 80,000 rifles. In July 1962, operational testing ended with a recommendation for the adoption of the ArmaLite AR-15 rifle chambered in .223 Remington. In September 1963, the .223 Remington cartridge was officially accepted and named "Cartridge, 5.56 mm ball, M193". The following year, the ArmaLite AR-15 was adopted by the United States Army as the M16 rifle, and it would later become the standard U.S. military rifle. The specification included a Remington-designed bullet and the use of IMR4475 powder, which resulted in a muzzle velocity of 3,250 ft/s and a chamber pressure of 52,000 psi.

=== Civilian introduction ===
In the spring of 1962, Remington submitted the specifications of the .223 Remington to the Sporting Arms and Ammunition Manufacturers' Institute (SAAMI). In December 1963, Remington introduced its first rifle chambered for .223 Remington a Model 760 rifle.

== Cartridge dimensions ==
The .223 Remington has a 1.87 mL (28.8 gr H_{2}O) cartridge case capacity.

.223 Remington maximum CIP cartridge dimensions. All sizes in millimeters (mm).

Americans would define the shoulder angle at alpha/2 = 23 degrees. The common rifling twist rate for this cartridge is 305 mm (1 in 12 in), 6 grooves, Ø lands = 5.56 millimetres (0.219 in), Ø grooves = 5.69 millimetres (0.224 in), land width = 1.88 millimetres (0.074 in) and the primer type is small rifle.

According to the official CIP rulings, the .223 Remington can handle up to 430.00 MPa (62,366 psi) P_{max} piezo pressure. In CIP-regulated countries, every rifle cartridge combination has to be proofed at 125% of this maximum CIP pressure to certify for sale to consumers. This means that .223 Remington chambered arms in CIP-regulated countries are as of 2016 proof tested at 537.50 MPa (77,958 psi) PE piezo pressure. This is equal to the NATO maximum service pressure guideline for the 5.56×45mm NATO cartridge.

The SAAMI pressure limit for the .223 Remington is set at 379.212 MPa (55,000 psi), piezo pressure. Remington submitted .223 Remington specifications to SAAMI in 1964.

== .223 Remington vs. 5.56×45mm NATO ==
In 1980 the 5.56×45mm NATO (SS109 or M855) cartridge was developed from the .223 Remington.

=== Dimensions ===
The external dimensional specifications of .223 Remington and 5.56×45mm NATO brass cases are nearly identical. The cases tend to have similar case capacity when measured (case capacities have been observed to vary by as much as 2.6 grains (0.17 ml)), although the shoulder profile and neck length are not the same and 5.56×45mm NATO cartridge cases tend be slightly thicker to accommodate higher chamber pressures. When hand-loaded, care is taken to look for pressure signs as 5.56×45mm NATO cases may produce higher pressures with the same type of powder and bullet as compared to .223 Remington cases. Sierra provides separate loading sections for .223 Remington and 5.56×45mm NATO and also recommends different loads for bolt-action rifles as compared to semiautomatic rifles.

=== Pressures ===
Remington submitted the specifications for the .223 Remington cartridge in 1964 to SAAMI. The original pressure for the .223 Remington was 52,000 psi with DuPont IMR Powder. A higher pressure of 55,000 psi (379 MPa) resulted from the change from IMR to Olin Ball powder. The official name for .223 Remington in the US Army is cartridge 5.56x45mm ball, M193. If a 5.56×45mm NATO cartridge is loaded into a chamber intended to use .223 Remington, the bullet will be in contact with the rifling and the forcing cone is very tight. This generates a much higher pressure than .223 Remington chambers are designed for.

Chamber pressures obtained using different methods are not comparable. The pressure limits for .223 Rem and 5.56×45mm NATO are very similar, if using similar measurement methodologies.

- The SAAMI sets the pressure limit for .223 Rem at 55,000 psi (379.21 MPa), using a chamber conformal transducer. The US military uses a similar methodology (SCATP) and produces a very similar limit for their ammunition, at 380 MPa (55,114 psi).
- The CIP sets the pressure limit for .223 Rem at 430 MPa (62,366 psi), using a perforated-case transducer.
- NATO EPVAT testing uses a case-mouth setup and is intended for 5.56×45mm NATO ammunition. The 2005 proof pressure is 537.5 MPa (77,958 psi), which when divided by a factor of 1.25 yields the same maximum service pressure of 430 MPa (62,366 psi).

=== Chambers ===
The .223 Remington and 5.56×45mm NATO barrel chamberings are not the same according to Clymer, with the 5.56 NATO chamber having generally slightly larger dimensions. A brochure from "Forster Products" claims that while the headspace gauge for .223 Rem is 1.4636/1.4666/1.4696 for Go/NoGo/Field, the gauge is 1.4636/1.4736 for Min/Max on 5.56 NATO. The brochure goes on to claim that this could mean a premature contact with rifling with 5.56 ammunition if fired from a .223 chamber. However, the 2025 SAAMI specification for the headspace dimension on .223 Rem is the same as what Forster claimed for 5.56 NATO: 1.4636 to 1.4736. In any case, the premature contact allegation is likely not based on headspace differences, but on the lede length and angle difference between the two chambers, with 5.56 NATO having a shallower and longer lede.

By observation, 5.56×45mm NATO ammunition is not as accurate as .223 Remington in many of the AR-type rifles extant, even with the same bullet weight. The .223 Wylde chamber specification developed by Bill Wylde solves this problem by using the external dimensions and lead angle as found in the military 5.56×45mm NATO cartridge and the 0.224 inch freebore diameter as found in the civilian SAAMI .223 Remington cartridge. It was designed to increase the accuracy of 5.56×45mm NATO ammunition to that of .223 Remington. Other companies also have chamber designs that increase 5.56×45mm NATO accuracy. (The "lower accuracy" observation for 5.56 chambers running .223 ammunition has not been reproduced with newer tests.)

Andrew of LuckyGunner LLC has collected 8 different chamber dimensions from various reamer companies, including .223 Rem, .223 Wylde, and 5.56. He also emphasizes that manufacturing differences will make each actual chamber dimensionally different from others. In addition, he tested 5.56 NATO ammunition in .223 Rem chambers and failed to find dangerous levels of pressure increase.

=== Rifling ===
NATO chose a 178-mm (1-in-7) rifling twist rate for the 5.56×45mm NATO chambering. The SS109/M855 5.56×45mm NATO ball cartridge requires a minimum 228 mm (1-in-9) twist rate, while adequately stabilizing the longer NATO L110/M856 5.56×45mm NATO tracer projectile requires an even faster 178 mm (1-in-7) twist rate.

=== Comparisons ===
The table contains some estimated pressures based on normal proofing practice and on the known increases in pressure caused by bullet setback (which is a similar occurrence with regard to pressure). The proof pressure of M197 is 70,000 psi.

The following table shows the differences in nomenclature, rifling, throating, and normal, maximum, and safe pressures:

Cartridge	US designation	NATO designation	Bullet	Rifling	Throat	Pressure in NATO chamber	in 223 SAAMI chamber	Safe sustained
223 Remington	223 Rem		55 gr FMJ	1:14	tight	52,000 psi (359 MPa)	52,000 psi (359 MPa)	Yes
223 Remington	M193	5.56×45mm	55 gr FMJ	1:12	tight	55,000 psi (379 MPa) CCT	55,000 psi (379 MPa)	Yes
223 Remington	Federal AE223	5.56×45mm	55 gr FMJBT	1:12	tight	50,000 psi (345 MPa) MCSG	N/A	N/A
223 Remington	Federal AE223	5.56×45mm	55 gr FMJBT	1:12	tight	44,000 psi (303 MPa) CCT	49,000 psi (338 MPa)	Yes
223 Remington	M196	5.56×45mm	54 gr Tracer	1:12	tight	55,000 psi (379 MPa)	55,000 psi (379 MPa)	Yes
223 Remington	M197		C10524197-56-2	1:12	tight	70,000 psi (483 MPa)	70,000 psi (483 MPa)	One time only
5.56×45 mm NATO	M855	SS109	62 gr ball	1:7	long	62,366 psi (430 MPa) EPVAT	over 70,000 psi (483 MPa)	No
5.56×45 mm NATO	M855	SS109	62 gr ball	1:7	long	55,000 psi (379 MPa) CCT	over 70,000 psi (483 MPa)	No
5.56×45 mm NATO	XM855 (Federal)	SS109	62 gr ball	1:7	long	57,500 psi (396 MPa)–61,500 psi (424 MPa) MCSG	60,500 psi (417 MPa) MCSG	Yes
5.56×45 mm NATO	XM855 (Federal)	SS109	62 gr ball	1:7	long	54,000 psi (372 MPa) CCT	59,000 psi (407 MPa) CCT	Yes
5.56×45 mm NATO	M856	L110	77 gr Tracer	1:7	long	62,366 psi (430 MPa) EPVAT	over 70,000 psi (483 MPa)	No
5.56×45 mm NATO	M857	SS111	Tungsten carbide	1:7	long	62,366 psi (430 MPa) EPVAT	over 70,000 psi (483 MPa)	No
5.56×45 mm NATO	Proof	Proof	unknown	1:7	long	77,958 psi (538 MPa) EPVAT	82,250 psi (567 MPa) estimated	No

Key to peak pressure measurement methods:

- EPVAT: NATO EPVAT testing at case mouth.
- CCT: chamber conformal transducer. Includes: SAAMI method and SAAMI-like "SCATP" method used by the US Army.
- CIP: CIP drilled-case.
- MCSG: mid-case strain gauge, appears to generate slightly higher readings than SAAMI.
- (no marking): unknown, hence difficult to compare.

Notes:

- "Rifling" and "throat", like chamber dimensions, should be attributes of the firearms themselves, and not of the ammunition. This probably refers to "intended" values for the ammunition.

== Effects of barrel length on velocity ==
Barrel length helps determine a specific cartridge's muzzle velocity. A longer barrel typically yields a greater muzzle velocity, while a shorter barrel yields a lower one. The first AR-15 rifles used a barrel length of 20".

== Usage and commercial offerings ==
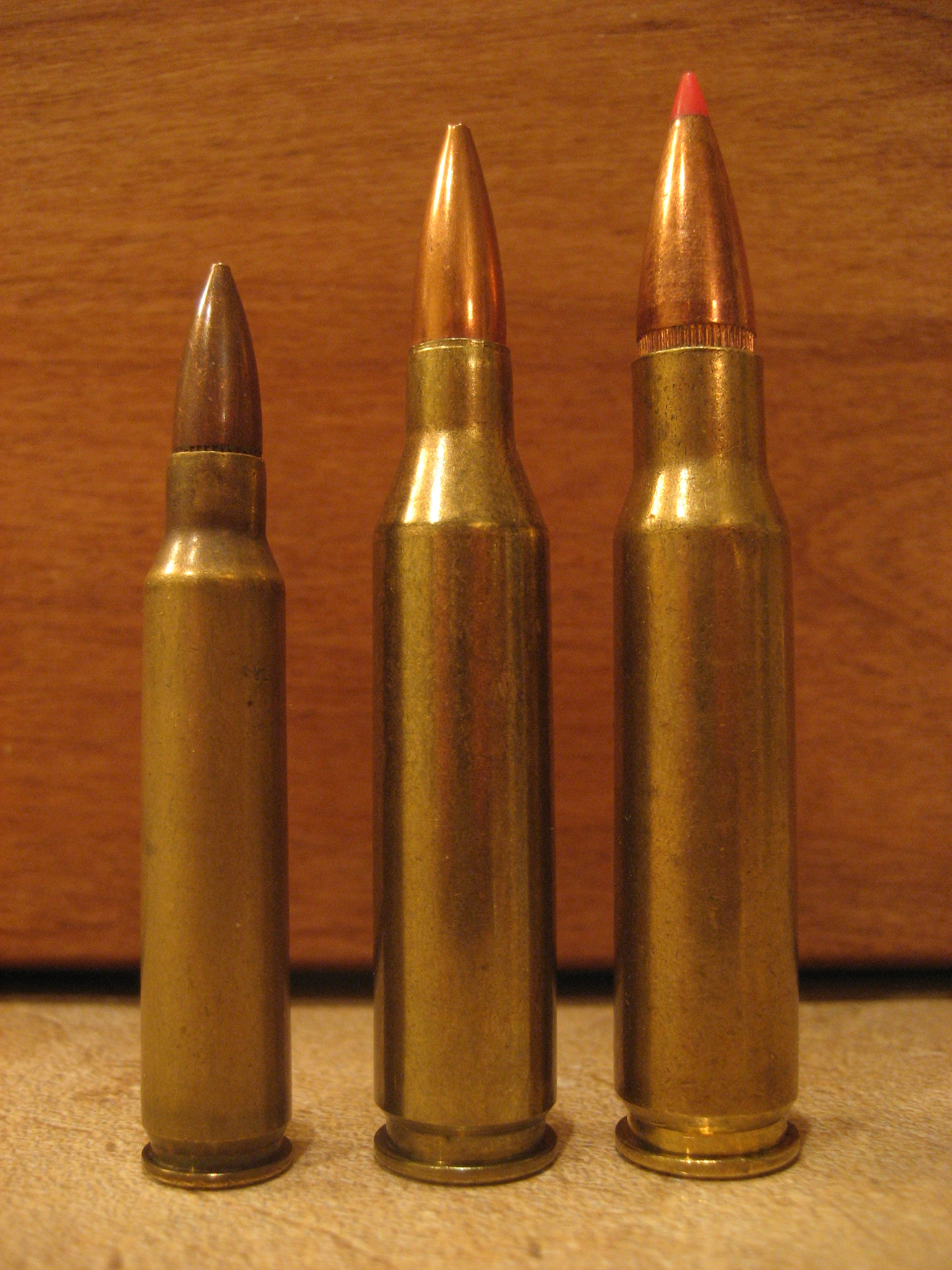
(Left to right) .223 Remington, .243 Winchester, .308 Winchester

The .223 Remington has become one of the most popular cartridges. It is used in a wide range of semiautomatic and manual-action rifles and even handguns, such as the Colt AR-15, Ruger Mini-14, Remington Model 700. For example, the cartridge has become widely used in the US, significantly reducing the prevalence of other similar .22 caliber center-fire varmint rifle cartridges such as the .22 Hornet.

It is commercially loaded with 0.224-inch (5.7 mm) diameter jacketed bullets, with weights ranging from 35 to 85 grains (2.27 to 5.8 g), with the most common loading by far being 55 gr (3.6 g). Ninety-grain and 95-grain (6.2 g) Sierra Matchking bullets are available for reloaders.

== See also ==
- .30 Remington AR
- 5 mm caliber
- 6×45mm
- Delta L problem
- List of rifle cartridges
- Sectional density
- Table of handgun and rifle cartridges
