= Walther PPQ =

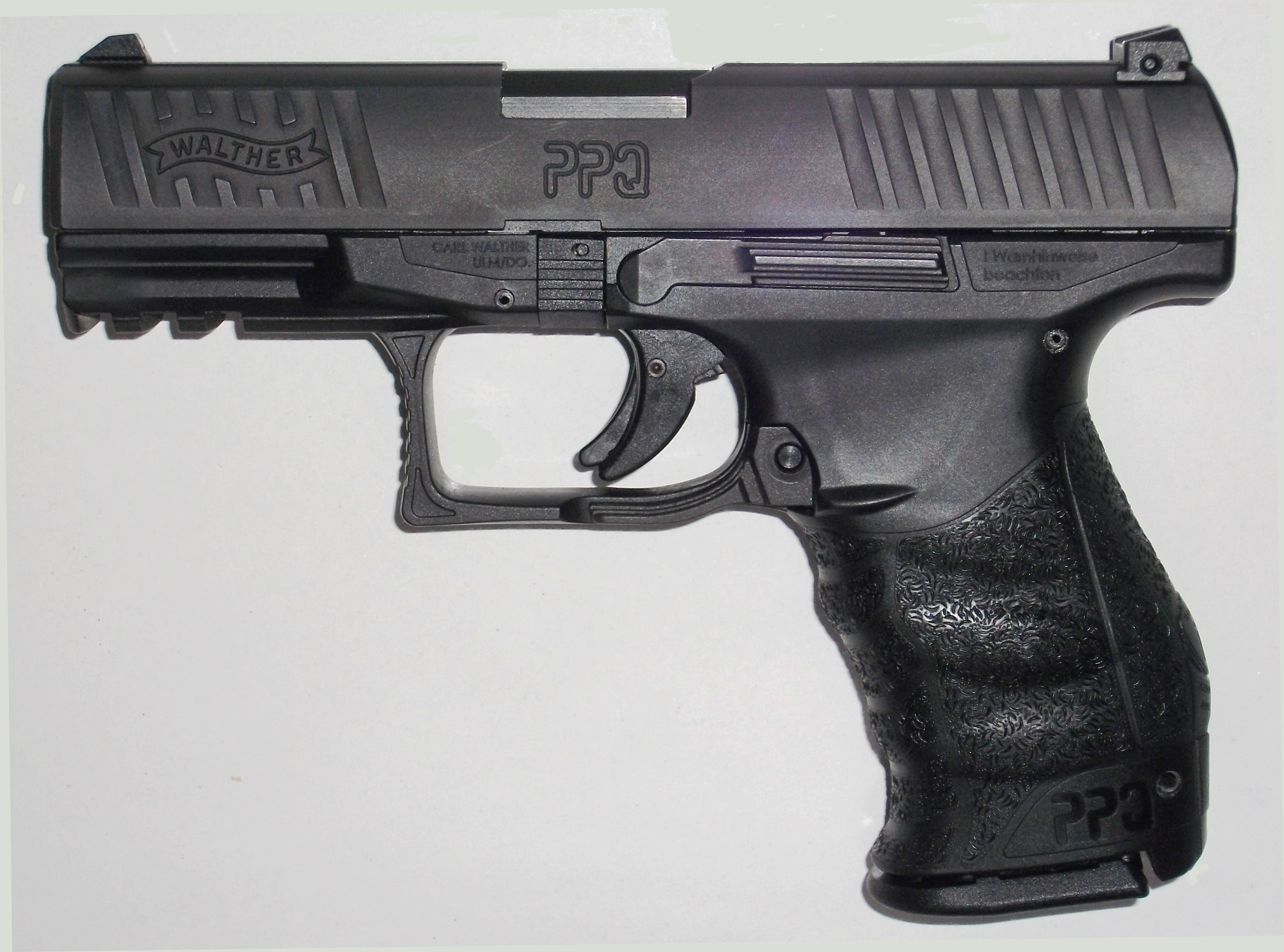
- Walther PPQ, 9×19mm Parabellum version.
- Type: Semi-automatic pistol
- Place of origin: Germany

Service history
- In service: 2011–2021
- Used by: See Users

Production history
- Designed: 2011
- Manufacturer: Carl Walther GmbH Sportwaffen
- Produced: 2011–2023
- Variants: See Variants

Specifications
- Mass: 615 g (21.7 oz) (9×19mm Parabellum empty); 695 g (24.5 oz) (9×19mm Parabellum + magazine); 855 g (30.2 oz) (9×19mm Parabellum + loaded magazine with RUAG ACTION 4 cartridges); 625 g (22.0 oz) (.40 S&W empty); 705 g (24.9 oz) (.40 S&W + magazine); 794 g (28.0 oz) (.45 ACP + magazine)
- Length: 180 mm (7.1 in) (9×19mm Parabellum); 184 mm (7.2 in) (.40 S&W); 188 mm (7.4 in) (.45 ACP)
- Barrel length: 102 mm (4.0 in) (9×19mm Parabellum); 106 mm (4.2 in) (.40 S&W); 108 mm (4.3 in) (.45 ACP)
- Width: 34 mm (1.3 in)
- Height: 135 mm (5.3 in); 147 mm (5.8 in) (.45 ACP)
- Cartridge: 9×19mm Parabellum; 9×21mm.40 S&W.45 ACP.22 LR
- Action: Short recoil operated, locked breech
- Muzzle velocity: 408 m/s (1,340 ft/s) (9×19mm Parabellum); 344 m/s (1,130 ft/s) (.40 S&W)
- Effective firing range: 50 m (55 yd) (9×19mm Parabellum)
- Feed system: 10, 15 or 17-round detachable box magazine (9×19mm Parabellum); 10, 12 or 14-round box magazine (.40 S&W); 12-round box magazine (.45 ACP)
- Sights: Interchangeable 3-dot iron sight

The Walther PPQ (German: [ˈvaltɐ], Polizeipistole Quick Defence / Police Pistol Quick Defence) is a striker-fired semi-automatic pistol developed by the German company Carl Walther GmbH Sportwaffen of Ulm for law enforcement, security/close protection and the civilian sport shooting market as a development of the Walther P99. It is available in 9×19mm Parabellum, 9×21mm, .40 S&W, .45 ACP and .22 LR chamberings.

In 2021, Walther announced that they would be discontinuing the PPQ in favor of the new Walther PDP. The PPQ was discontinued at the end of 2023, along with the P99 Final Edition.

== Product evolution ==
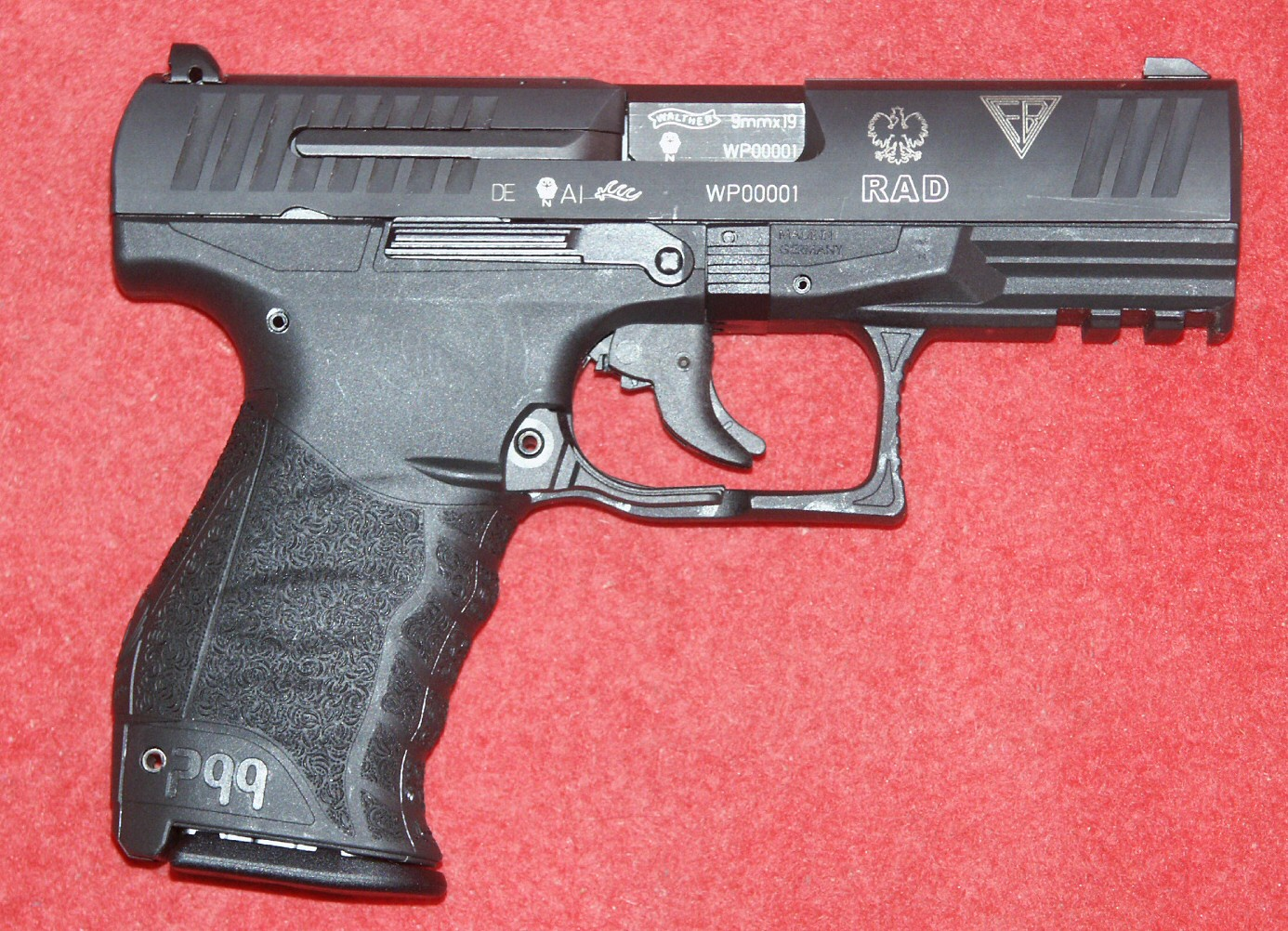
P99 RAD made under license in Poland.

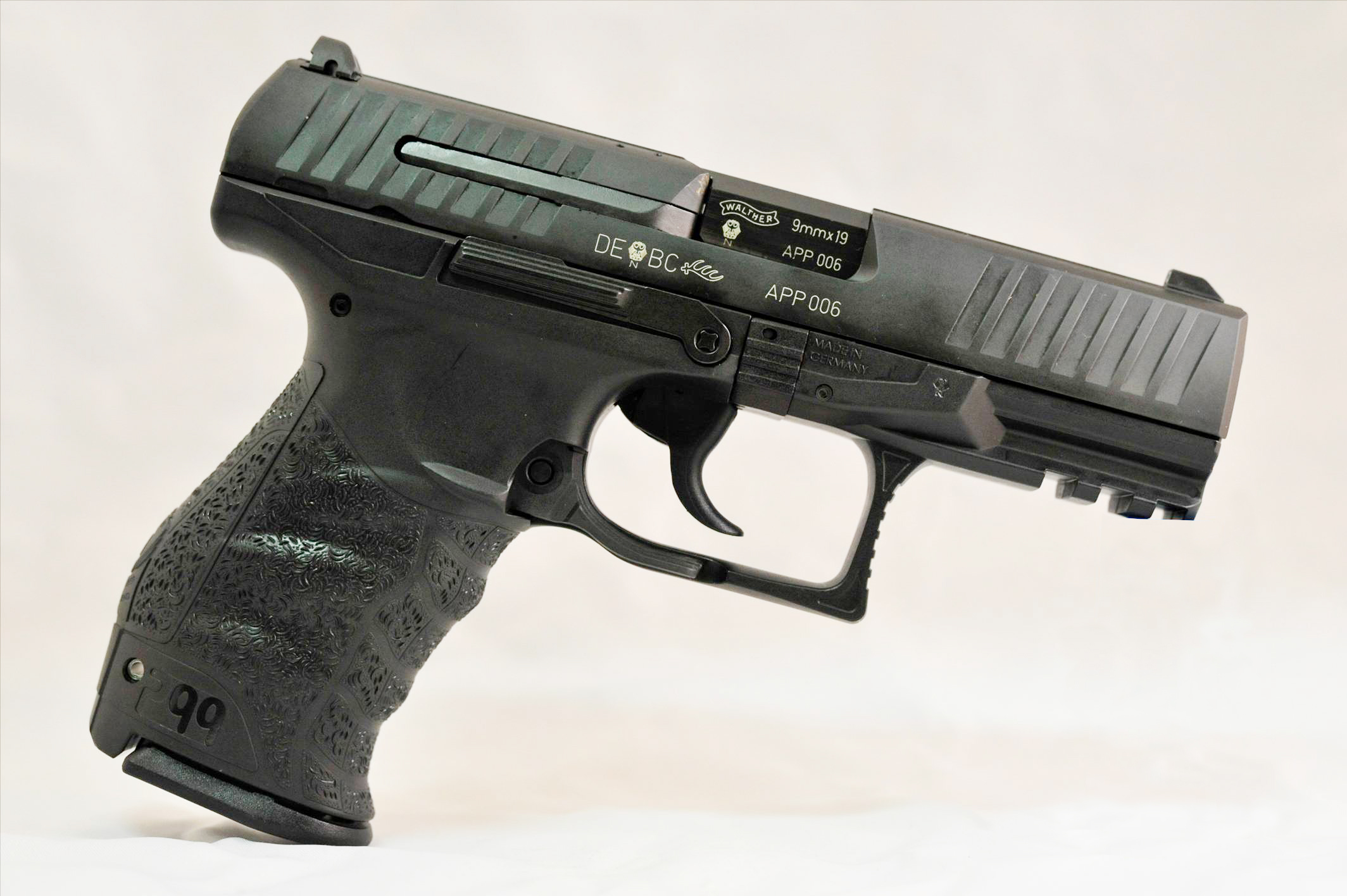
P99Q police duty pistol.

The Walther PPQ is not a true new design. It shares its engineering principles and main features with the Walther P99QA variant of the P99 pistol that was introduced in 2000. However, unlike the P99QA, which utilized a partially cocked striker (like a Glock), the PPQ utilizes a fully cocked striker. There were many other modifications made to the design that were not seen on the Walther P99QA, like the re-designed grip, trigger guard and slide with forward (big) serrations made their combined appearance in 2008 in the Walther P99 RAD, a P99 variant made in Poland and marketed as a military sidearm proposition and the Walther P99Q police pistol.

Due to product evolution the PPQ maintains compatibility with both P99 sights and P99 second-generation magazines and other accessories.

The main innovation of the PPQ over the P99QA, P99 RAD and P99Q is its 'Quick Defense' trigger.

== Design details ==
=== Operating mechanism ===
The Walther PPQ is a short recoil-operated locked breech semi-automatic pistol that uses a modified Browning cam-lock system adapted from the Hi-Power pistol. The PPQ has a glassfiber-reinforced polymer frame and steel slide assembly. It can be broken down into its main parts or field stripped with a take down catch without the need for tools.

=== Features ===
The internal preset striker 'Quick Defense' trigger of the PPQ is a departure from previous Walther pistols and has been developed for the PPQ. When the trigger is pulled, the trigger bar engages a disconnect lever, which props up a sear hook, which releases the fully pre-loaded striker assembly, firing the pistol. Pulling the trigger does not partially load the striker spring as with the Glock and many other striker fired pistol designs. The PPQ trigger pull is entirely due to the trigger and disconnector springs. The PPQ has a trigger travel of approximately 9 mm (0.4 in) with a relatively short trigger reset of 2.5 mm (0.1 in) and a trigger pull of approximately 25 N (5.6 lb_{f}). Unlike many other trigger systems, preset internal strikers have a let-off point and trigger pull that remains unchanged from the first shot to the last and requires no decocker. The striker of the PPQ variant does not protrude from the back of the slide, as the firearm is in a constant cocked state.

Due to its trigger characteristics, the PPQ pistol is marketed by Walther in Germany as a special forces pistol and not as a police duty pistol. The Technical Specifications (TR) of the German Police (Technische Richtlinie Pistolen im Kaliber 9mm x 19, Revision January 2008) for obtaining a German Police duty pistol certification require a first shot trigger pull of ≥30 N (6.7 lb_{f}), a trigger travel of ≥10 mm (0.4 in) and a trigger reset of ≥4 mm (0.2 in).

Ergonomics and fully ambidextrous controls were a key focus in the design of the firearm, and as a result, three interchangeable grip backstraps are included (small, medium and large) to accommodate various hand shapes and sizes; this feature permits most shooters a comfortable and efficient grip on the firearm. The injection molded grip frame contains four steel guide rails for the slide: two at the rear of the frame, and the remaining pair above the front of the trigger guard. The trigger guard itself is squared off at the front and textured. The polymer grip has a texturized 'HI-GRIP' non-slip surface on the sides and both the front and rear backstraps and a slightly funneled magazine well to aid magazine insertion. The hollow cross pin that secures the lower end of the backstrap was designed to function as a loophole for attachment of a lanyard. Under the dust cover the grip frame has an integrated mounting MIL-STD-1913 (Picatinny) rail for attaching accessories, such as a tactical light or laser pointer.

The slide and other metal parts of the pistol are Tenifer treated (a nitriding process also used on Glock pistols). The Tenifer finish is between 0.04 mm (0.002 in) and 0.05 mm (0.002 in) in thickness, and is characterized by extreme resistance to wear and corrosion; it penetrates the metal, and treated parts have similar properties even below the surface to a certain depth. The Tenifer process produces a matte gray-colored, non-glare surface with a 64 Rockwell C hardness rating and a 99% resistance to salt water corrosion (which meets or exceeds stainless steel specifications), making the PPQ particularly suitable for individuals carrying the pistol concealed as the highly chloride-resistant finish allows the pistol to better endure the effects of perspiration.

PPQ pistols are delivered in a polymer pistol case containing the pistol, three backstraps of different sizes, two magazines (one standard length and one extended grip length), magazine loader, safety cable lock, instruction manual, warranty papers, factory test target showing five shots fired at 15 m (16 yd) distance, and an envelope with the case of the proof round fired during the proof test at the C.I.P. accredited Beschussamt Ulm (Proof House Ulm).

=== Barrel ===
The PPQ pistol's 9×19mm Parabellum and .40 S&W chambered barrels are rifled with traditional lands and grooves to stabilize the bullet in flight. The PPQ M2 .45 ACP barrels deviate from the other models having polygonal rifling instead. As of 2016 the PPQ M2 9×19mm Parabellum and .40 S&W barrels also feature polygonal rifling.

=== Safety ===
The PPQ features three internal safeties (trigger safety, firing pin safety and disconnector safety) of which the external integrated trigger safety inner lever mechanism contained within the trigger serves as an additional passive drop safety. The pistol has a loaded chamber indicator in the form of an extractor on the right side of the slide that gets recessed in the slide when a cartridge is present in the chamber. When the extractor is recessed a red coloured indicator at the end of the extractor also becomes visible.

=== Feeding ===
The PPQ feeds from staggered-column or double stack magazines of varying capacity. Walther also offers staggered-column magazines with a +2 baseplate that add 2 rounds to the magazine capacity at the expense of extending the grip and the pistol height by approximately 18 mm (0.7 in). For jurisdictions which restrict magazine capacity to 10 rounds, Walther offers single stack 10-round magazines. The magazines are made of steel for Walther by the Italian subcontractor MEC-GAR and have an anti friction coating for easy loading and anti-corrosion and witness holes to view how many rounds are in the magazine. A steel spring drives an orange coloured plastic follower. The standard staggered-column PPQ magazines weigh 80 g (2.8 oz) After the last cartridge has been fired, the magazine follower exerts upward pressure on the slide stop causing it to engage the slide stop notch thereby holding it in the "open" position. The slide stop release levers are located on the left and right sides of the frame directly beneath the slide and can be manipulated by the thumb of the shooting hand. When a cartridge is present in the chamber the pistol can be fired without the need of having a magazine inserted in the weapon.

Empty magazines are released by depressing ambidextrous magazine release levers incorporated into the trigger guard in all non M2 PPQ variants or by depressing a reversible thumb release push-button located behind the bottom of the trigger guard in the PPQ M2 variant. Additionally, the PPQ M2 magazines are not compatible with the original PPQ magazines.

=== Sights ===
The standard iron sights are made of steel or polymer depending on the country in which the pistol is sold. The rear sighting element is adjustable for windage by a screw and the front sighting element can be adjusted for elevation by exchanging the front sight. For this Walther offers front sight elements in four differing heights and rear sight elements in two differing heights. The standard sights have 3 high-contrast dots which serve as contrast enhancements and have been painted with afterglow paint to aid target acquisition under unfavourable lighting conditions. Tritium illuminated night sights are also available. Due to product evolution in the Walther pistol line the PPQ maintains compatibility with Walther P99 and Walther PPS sights. The sight radius is 156 mm (6.1 in) for the PPQ 9×19mm Parabellum models and 158 mm (6.2 in) for the PPQ .40 S&W models.

=== Overpressure ammunition ===
According to Walther "Plus-P" (+P) overpressure ammunition may affect the wear characteristics of the PPQ pistol or exceed the margin of safety. Use of "Plus-P" ammunition may, according to Walther, result in the need for more frequent service. Walther recommends against the use of "Plus-P-Plus" (+P+) overpressure ammunition in Walther firearms. This marking on the ammunition designates that it exceeds established industry standards, but the designation does not represent defined pressure limits and therefore such ammunition may vary significantly as to the pressures generated.

=== Accessories ===
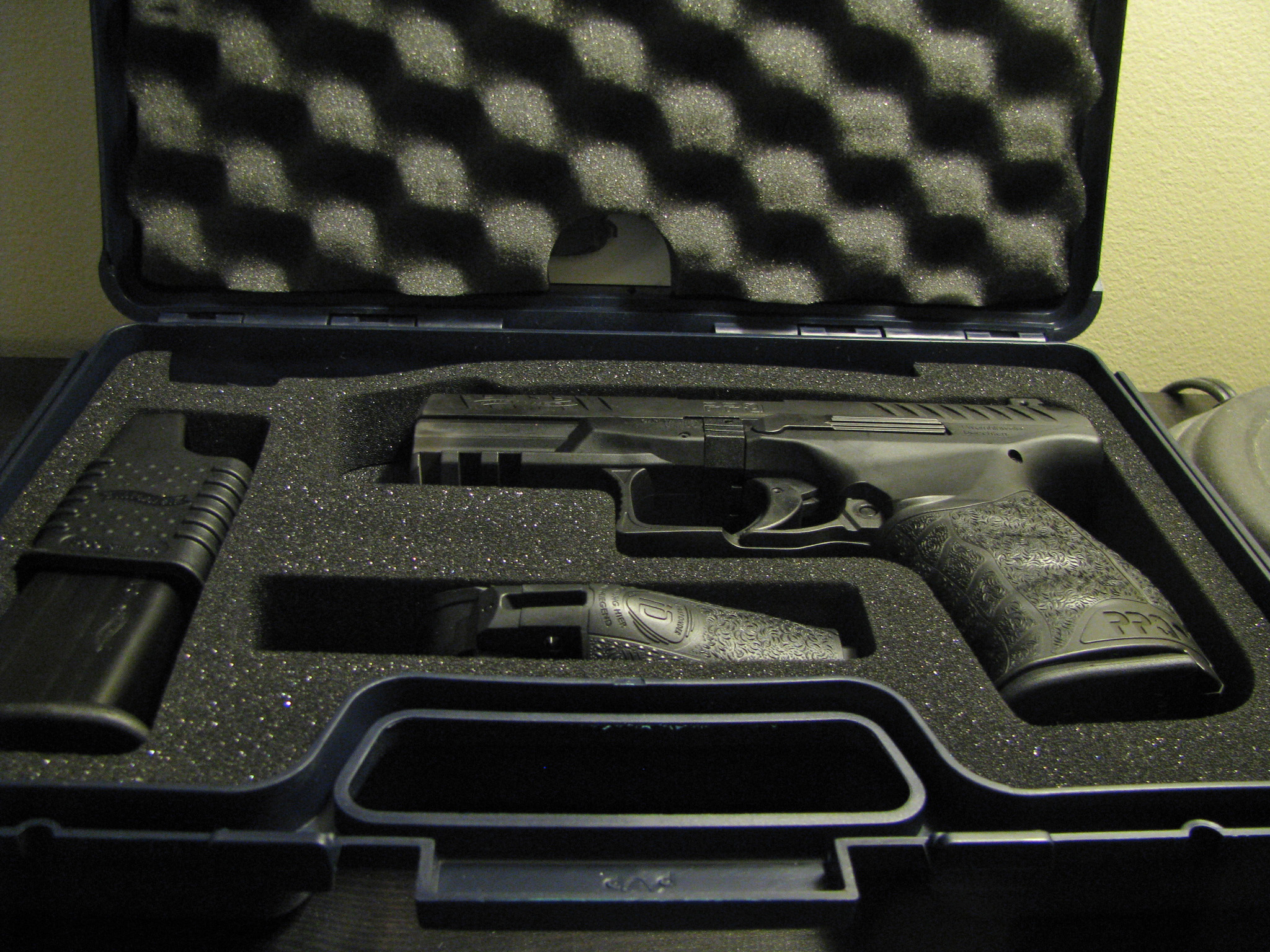
Walther PPQ pistol in its factory pistol case. PPQ pistols are delivered in a polymer pistol case containing; the pistol, three backstraps of different sizes, two magazines, magazine loader, instruction manual, warranty papers, factory test target showing five shots fired at 15 m (16 yd) distance and an envelope with the case of the proof round fired during the proof test at the C.I.P. accredited Beschussamt Ulm (Proof House Ulm)

Factory accessories include: fixed metal 3-dot iron sights, fixed tritium night sights, adjustable sports iron sights, adjustable optic fibre iron sights, laser pointers, tactical lights, magazine flashlight adapters, holsters, magazines, magazine loaders, grip extenders and a suppressor kit with a 118 mm (4.6 in) barrel, protective cap for the muzzle threads and a sound suppressor of the Impuls II-A product line made by Brügger & Thomet are offered as factory accessories. For the recording of weapon specific data, a passive RFID transponder may be integrated into the backstrap of the pistol. The stored data can be read via an external unit.

== Variants ==
The PPQ Tactical Navy is a variant that has a firing mechanism that has been modified for operations in and near water. A non-standard hole in the striker channel ensures sufficient water displacement if the weapon becomes completely flooded with water. Hydraulic resistance is offset by means of a stronger striker spring. In addition, special guides reduce the hydraulic resistance when the striker moves forward. These pistols are delivered with a standard staggered-column magazine and a second magazine with a +2 baseplate that add 2 rounds to the magazine capacity

The PPQ Tactical Navy SD is the same pistol as the PPQ Tactical Navy with the addition of a 118 mm (4.6 in) long special barrel with a threaded muzzle for mounting a suppressor.

The PPQ First Edition is a variant marketed in the United States. These pistols have PPQ First Edition roll marked on the slide and feature a 118 mm (4.6 in) long special barrel with a threaded muzzle for mounting a suppressor and fixed metal 3-dot tritium night sights. Further these pistols are delivered with a standard staggered-column magazine, a second magazine with a +2 baseplate that adds 2 rounds to the magazine capacity and a set of standard polymer sights which use afterglow paint as contrast enhancements instead of tritium inserts.

=== M2 series ===
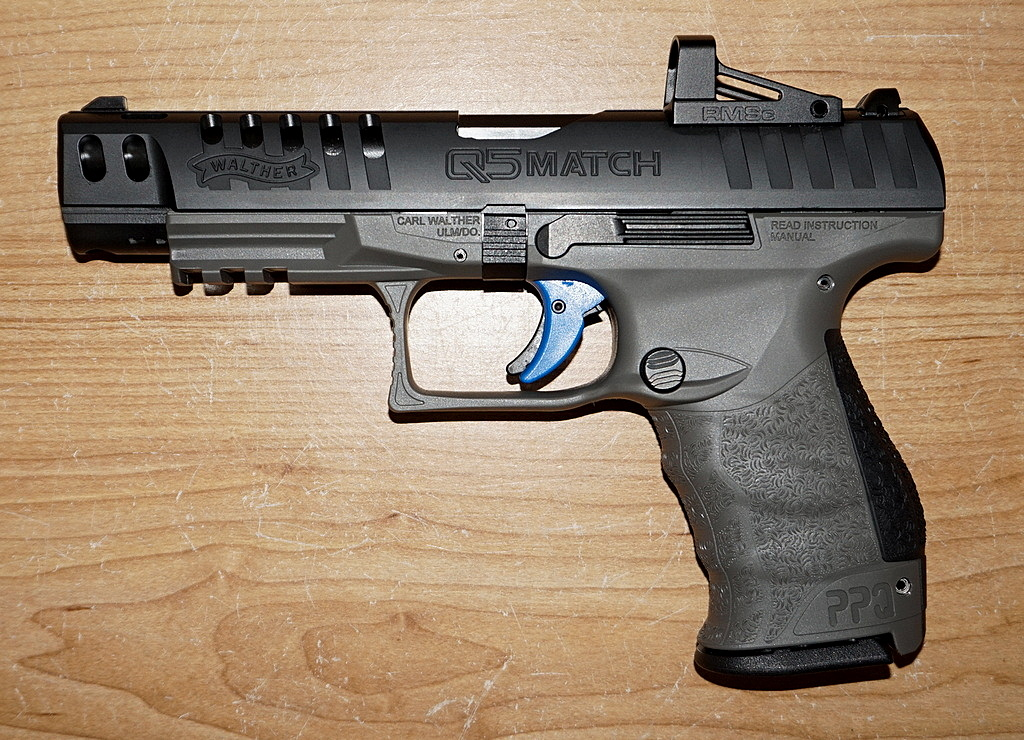
M2 series sport orientated Walther PPQ Q5 Match with red dot reflex sight

The PPQ M2 is a variant introduced at the 2013 Shot Show by the newly formed Walther Arms Inc. It has the same features as the standard PPQ with the sole exception that the ambidextrous magazine release levers incorporated into the bottom of the trigger guard have been omitted and replaced by a thumb release push-button located behind the bottom of the trigger guard. For left-handed use the magazine release push-button is reversible.
Additionally, the PPQ M2 magazines are not compatible with the original PPQ magazines.

The PPQ M2 Navy SD was introduced in 2014 and is a 9×19mm Parabellum variant that has a firing mechanism that has been modified for operations in and near water. A non-standard hole in the striker channel ensures sufficient water displacement if the weapon becomes completely flooded with water. Hydraulic resistance is offset by means of a stronger striker spring. In addition, special guides reduce the hydraulic resistance when the striker moves forward. It has a 118 mm (4.6 in) long special barrel with a threaded muzzle for mounting a suppressor. These pistols are delivered with a standard staggered-column magazine and a second magazine with a +2 baseplate that add 2 rounds to the magazine capacity.

The PPQ M2 5" Sport was introduced in 2014 and is a PPQ sport shooting orientated variant offered in 9×19mm Parabellum and .40 S&W chamberings featuring a longer 127 mm (5.0 in) barrel and slide assembly that offers a 183 mm (7.2 in) sight line. The lengthened slide has two rows of three oval shaped lightening cut openings at the muzzle end of the slide. The PPQ M2 5" Sport models have an overall length of 206 mm (8.1 in). The PPQ M2 Sport 9×19mm Parabellum weighs 657 g (23.2 oz) (empty) and the PPQ M2 Sport .40 S&W weighs 670 g (24 oz) (empty).

In August 2015 Walther announced the PPQ M2 in .45 ACP that should be available in October 2015. The pistol has been enlarged to accommodate .45 ACP cartridges, also resulting in a heavier pistol. A thicker and longer slide rides a little higher over the bore out to the end of the lengthened barrel. Unlike the PPQ 9×19mm Parabellum and .40 S&W chambered models the PPQ M2 .45 ACP features polygonal rifling. The ejection port was also redesigned to accommodate .45 ACP cartridge cases.

=== Walther PDP ===
In February 2021, Walther officially released the Walther Performance Duty Pistol, or PDP. The PDP represents an upgraded PPQ with an improved trigger, deeper slide serrations, and more aggressive grip texturing. The PDP slide is milled and drilled for an aiming optic and features a matching cover plate when no optics are mounted. Walther also announced that the PPQ would be discontinued in favor of the PDP. The PPQ was discontinued at the end of 2023, along with the P99 Final Edition.

=== Training variants ===
The PPQ Simunition FX is available in a version for shooting 9 mm FX Force-on-Force System paintballs made by Simunition.

The PPQ Red Gun is a pistol identical in design and operation to the actual service weapons. All functional elements, dimensions, weights and trigger characteristics are the same. However, PPQ Red Guns do not allow loading or firing of ammunition. The PPQ Blue Gun is a plastic pistol intended for holster training.

=== Similar form factor rimfire pistol ===
PPQ form factor inspired .22 Long Rifle pistols are offered by Walther under the P22Q and PPQ M2 .22lr designations. These pistols feature simple blowback actions where pressure generated by a firing cartridge is countered by a combination of the inertial weight of the slide assembly and the force of the recoil spring. Like the Walther P22 action, it differs fundamentally from the PPQ short recoil-operated locked breech action.

== Users ==
- Finland: Used by the Police of Finland. In 2012, the Finnish police changed its main service weapon from Glock 17s to the Walther PPQ. Many Glocks still stay in service as of 2022.
- Republic of China (Taiwan): Used by the National Police Agency. In 2015, the PPQ M2 (M2 combined with M1 fully ambidextrous paddle magazine releases) was chosen through testing/bidding to replace the Smith & Wesson 5904, and 6904 as Taiwan Police standard issued pistol. The testing/bidding process included the Glock 19, SIG Sauer P250, Taurus PT92, and PPQ M2 pistols. The Glock and PPQ went into second phase - shooting test, and both passed the required 3,600 rounds non-malfunction shooting and 1,200 rounds accuracy testing. During bidding phase, Walther won the government contract to deliver 49,600 PPQ M2 pistols in 5 years. The contract purchase price is approximately $267 per pistol.
