= Chamber pressure =

Pressure within the chamber of a firearm

Within firearms, chamber pressure is the pressure exerted by a cartridge case's outside walls on the inside of a firearm's chamber when the cartridge is fired. The SI unit for chamber pressure is the megapascal (MPa), while the American SAAMI uses the pound per square inch (psi, symbol lbf/in^{2}) and the European CIP uses bar (1 bar is equal to 0.1 MPa).

Regardless of pressure unit used, the measuring procedure varies between CIP method, SAAMI method, and NATO EPVAT. The chamber pressures are measured to different standards thus can not be directly compared. Chamber pressures have also historically been recorded in copper units of pressure (which for example can be denoted psi CUP, bar CUP, or MPa CUP) or lead units of pressure (LUP).

== Overview ==
When the firing pin in a firearm strikes the primer, it ignites the powder inside the case, igniting the powder causing obturation that generates a large amount of pressure, often exceeding 50,000 PSI (344.7 MPa). This pressure in turn pushes the bullet out of the case mouth and into the barrel. During this obturation, the brass walls of the cartridge expand and seal against the inner walls of the chamber. This expansion is what creates chamber pressure, or the amount of force applied to the inside of the chamber by the case. Maximum safe chamber pressures for commercially available cartridges are published by bodies such as SAAMI, CIP and NATO.

== Measuring methods ==
There are 3 basic methods for measuring chamber pressure:

- Using a copper crusher or lead crusher
- The Piezo method
- Attaching a strain gauge to the barrel forward of the chamber

=== Copper crusher method ===
Through the mid-1960s, the most common way of measuring pressure was drilling a hole through the chamber of the barrel and inserting a copper slug that fit flush with the chamber walls. When a cartridge is fired, it compresses the copper slug. It is then removed, measured, and compared to the original dimensions. Using the known properties of copper, the chamber pressure can then be calculated and expressed in copper units of pressure (CUP). While there are now more accurate methods of measuring chamber pressure, the copper crusher method is still used for verification purposes.

=== The piezo method ===
Developed in the late 1960s, the most common method of accurately measuring chamber pressure is the Piezo method. It is similar to the copper crusher method where a hole is drilled into the chamber, but rather than a copper slug a quartz crystal transducer is inserted and attached to sensitive measuring equipment. This method generally yields more accurate readings than the copper crusher, and is more cost efficient due to the fact that the transducer can be reused.

=== Strain gauge method ===
The strain gauge method is the least accurate method of measuring chamber pressure using equipment, but has the advantage of being the least expensive and requires no permanent modifications to the firearm. A strain gauge is attached to the barrel just forward of the chamber. Upon firing, the barrel stretches briefly, and this stretch is measured by the gauge. This method is generally reserved as a way of relatively comparing different cartridge loads as the strain gauge reading is not as accurate as a copper crusher or Piezo test.

== Importance in firearm maintenance ==
The force that is not exerted on the chamber walls is used to push the bullet down the barrel. Because the volume of the case is relatively small, the pressure closest to the chamber will be higher than at any other point in the barrel. Compared to the temperature of the powder being burned, a relatively small amount of energy and heat is transferred from the powder in the barrel to the barrel walls. Therefore, the entire process can be considered an adiabatic process, or no heat is lost during the rapid expansion of the gases. Thus, the ideal gas law can be used to express the difference in pressure as the bullet travels along the barrel:

$P_1 {V_1}^\gamma = P_2 {V_2}^\gamma$

or

$P_2 = P_1 (\frac{V_1}{V_2})^\gamma$

where:

- P_{1} is the initial pressure
- P_{2} is the pressure acting against the tail of the bullet at a given point
- V_{1} is the internal case capacity, or volume of the loaded cartridge
- V_{2} is the internal case capacity plus the volume of the barrel from the chamber to the bullet
- κ is the adiabatic index of the gas contained inside the chamber and the barrel

Looking at this thermodynamic equation, it can be seen that the amount of pressure acting upon the bullet decreases at it travels down the barrel due to the increase of the gas volume. Likewise, the part of the barrel that is subject to the highest pressures is the throat, or the point closest to the chamber at which the bullet engages the rifling. Because of this, the rifling at the throat will erode faster than the rest of the barrel.

Several measures can be taken to decrease the rate of throat erosion due to pressure, some of which can be achieved by handloading.

1. If a bullet is seated further out (i.e. closer to the rifling) it will increase the internal volume of the case. By examining the ideal gas law, PV=nRT, it can be seen that by increasing the case volume, the pressure inside the case is reduced. This in turn reduces the chamber pressure and the amount of force exerted upon the throat.
2. If the amount of powder is decreased (using the same gunpowder), the explosion inside the case will be smaller and will result in less pressure.
