= Deutsche Versuchs- und Prüfanstalt für Jagd- und Sportwaffen =

Logo

The German Experimental and Test Institute for Hunting and Sporting Firearms (founded 26 November 1888) (German Deutsche Versuchs- und Prüfanstalt für Jagd- und Sportwaffen e.V.), usually shortened DEVA, is a German manufacturer's association whose purpose is to provide independent advice and testing for firearms and ammunition. DEVA conducts its work independently, and is co-owned by most German firearm manufacturers, such as Blaser, Heckler & Koch, Heym, Mauser, Merkel, Sauer, etc. DEVA today consists of two branches, one in Dune, Altenbeken and one on Stahnsdorfer Damm, Berlin.

== History ==
In the 1880s, the transformation from black to smokeless powder propellants also took place in the civilian sector. The handling and production of firearms and ammunition turned out to be complicated and little explored. As a result, there was a growing desire among hunters for an independent advisory and testing center for civilian firearms.

In 1888, the predecessor of DEVA was founded under the name Deutsche Versuchs-Anstalt für Handfeuerwaffen (literally The German Experimental Institute for Small Arms). Their tasks included amongst others the standardization of propellant charges and creation of the basis of what was to become the German law on ammunition. The first president of the association, elected in 1893, was his highness the Duke of Ratibor, who died later in the same year. In 1921, the association became involved in small caliber sport shooting as a founding member of the association Kleinkaliberschützen Berlin, which was the first small caliber shooting sports club in Germany, a club that is still active today. In the 1930s, the associations area of responsibility covered the entire technical field of hunting and sports shooting in Germany. After the Second World War, Deutsche Versuchs-Anstalt für Handfeuerwaffen was banned as an organization of the Nazi regime, and its grounds in Berlin-Wannsee were permanently confiscated.

In 1953, the Deutsche Institut für Jagdliches und Sportliches Schießen e. V. (lit. German Institute for Hunting and Sport Shooting) was founded in Düsseldorf, which in 1970 was merged with the Deutschen Versuchsanstalt für Handfeuerwaffen (German Test Institute for Firearms) into the current DEVA.

== Activities ==
The tasks of DEVA includes:

- Research and development
- Examination and assessment of hunting and sporting firearms, aiming devices and ammunition
- Assessment of firearm damages from accidents
- Assessment of shooting ranges
- Provide information to hunters and shooters

== Facilities ==
=== Shooting range Berlin-Halensee ===
The first shooting range of the association was established in Berlin-Halensee on a site of the Reichsbahn after mediation with Kaiser Wilhelm. In addition to the shooting range itself, the association also received a building for the technical facilities. In 1927, the site had to be returned to the Reichsbahn.

=== Shooting range Berlin Wannsee ===
As a replacement for the property in Halensee, the city of Berlin provided the association with a 7 hectares (17 acres) site in Wannsee, on which a large building for administration and technology was built in 1928. The complex included various shooting ranges up to 300 m (330 yd) and a clay target shooting stand. (52°24′56.484″N 13°10′31.512″E) The shooting competitions at the 1936 Olympic were held at this range.

After the Second World War, most of the buildings were destroyed. The site was in the US sector of the city, and was confiscated by the US military government. The US military's Berlin Brigade took the area into use under the name Rose Range. In addition to the US military, the Berlin police also used the shooting ranges. The American Rod&Gun Club used the range on the weekends.

After the withdrawal of the Allies in 1994, the Wannsee shooting range was returned to the Germany, and has since then again been used by a branch of DEVA.

=== Shooting range Düsseldorf ===
From 1953 to 1970, the German Institute for Hunting and Sport Shooting was located at the shooting range in Düsseldorf-Gerresheim. The range was closed in 1970 due to noise pollution.

=== Shooting range Buke ===
Following the closure of the Düsseldorf shooting range, the institute was relocated to the Dune 3 shooting range of the hunting club Landesjagdverband Nordrhein-Westfalen e. V (NRW) near the small town of Buke in Paderborn, Altenbeken. A branch of DEVA is still situated at the shooting range today.

== See also ==
- Small arms ammunition pressure testing
- Overpressure ammunition
- CIP, a European standardization organization for firearm cartridges
- SAAMI, an American standardization organization for firearm cartridges
- NATO EPVAT testing
- Wildcat cartridge
