= Walther PPS =

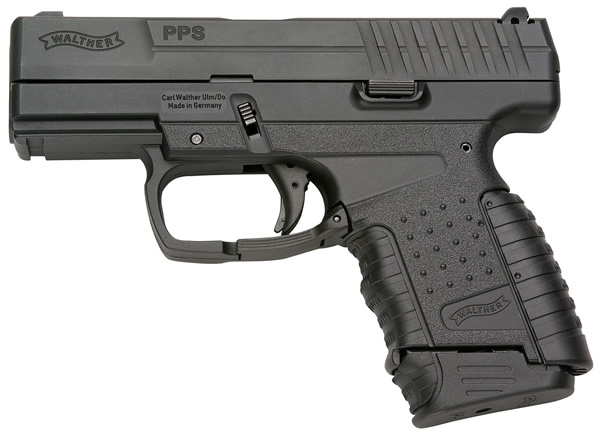
- Walther PPS, 9×19mm Shown with mid-size magazine (7 round for 9×19mm, 6 round for .40 cal.)
- Type: Semi-automatic pistol
- Place of origin: Germany

Production history
- Designer: Stefan Eith
- Designed: 2003–2007
- Manufacturer: Carl Walther GmbH Sportwaffen
- Produced: 2007–present
- Variants: PPS, PPS Police, PPS First Edition

Specifications
- Mass: 550 g (19.4 oz) (9×19mm Parabellum empty); 560 g (19.8 oz) (.40 S&W empty)
- Length: 160.5 mm (6.32 in)
- Barrel length: 81 mm (3.2 in)
- Width: 27 mm (1.1 in) (including controls)
- Height: 112 mm (4.4 in) (small magazine); 124 mm (4.9 in) (medium magazine); 134 mm (5.3 in) (large magazine)
- Cartridge: 9×19mm Parabellum.40 S&W
- Action: Short recoil operated
- Muzzle velocity: 350 m/s (1,148 ft/s) (9×19mm Parabellum); 335 m/s (1,099 ft/s) (.40 S&W)
- Effective firing range: 50 m (55 yd) (9×19mm Parabellum)
- Feed system: 6, 7 or 8 round detachable box magazine (9×19mm Parabellum); 5, 6, or 7 round detachable box magazine (.40 S&W)
- Sights: Interchangeable 3-dot iron sight

The Walther PPS (Polizei-Pistole Schmal / Police Pistol Slim) is a semi-automatic pistol developed by the German company Carl Walther GmbH Sportwaffen of Ulm for concealed carry for civilians and plainclothes law enforcement personnel. It is available in either 9×19mm Parabellum or .40 S&W chamberings. It was first shown in 2007 at the IWA & OutdoorClassics and is a slim polymer framed weapon of similar size to the Walther PPK pistol. The PPS is however technically much more based on the Walther P99 pistol.

PPS pistols manufactured by Walther in Ulm, Germany are imported to the United States through Walther Arms. The PPS pistols are also made under license in Poland by Fabryka Broni Radom.

== Design details ==
=== Operating mechanism ===
The Walther PPS is a short recoil-operated locked breech semi-automatic pistol that uses a modified Browning cam-lock system adapted from the Hi-Power pistol. The PPS has a glassfiber-reinforced polymer frame and steel slide assembly. It can be broken down into its main parts or field stripped with a take down catch without the help of tools.

=== Features ===
The pre-loaded internal striker is a variant of the partially cocked striker system of the Walther P99 Quick Action model. When the trigger is pulled, the already partially cocked striker is fully cocked and released, firing the pistol. An indicator on the back of the slide shows if the striker is partially cocked. The 'QuickSafe' trigger variant main difference with the Walther P99 Quick Action trigger is that removing the PPS pistol's backstrap will disable the gun for safe storage by decocking and blocking the striker until the backstrap is reinstalled. The PPS has a trigger travel of approximately 6 mm (0.2 in) and a trigger pull of approximately 27 N (6.1 lb_{f}). Unlike many other trigger systems preset internal strikers have a let-off point and trigger pull that remains unchanged from the first shot to the last and requires no decocker.

Ergonomics were a key focus in the design of the firearm, and as a result, two interchangeable grip backstraps are included (medium and large) to accommodate various hand shapes and sizes; this feature permits most shooters a comfortable and efficient grip on the firearm The injection molded grip frame contains 4 steel guide rails for the slide: two at the rear of the frame, and the remaining pair above the front of the trigger guard. The polymer grip has a non-slip surface on the sides and both the front and rear straps and a slightly funneled magazine well to aid magazine insertion. Under the dust cover the grip frame has an integrated mounting MIL-STD-1913 (Picatinny) rail for attaching accessories, such as a tactical light or laser pointer.

The slide and other metal parts of the pistol are Tenifer treated (a ferritic nitrocarburizing process also used on Glock pistols). The Tenifer finish is between 0.04 mm (0.002 in) and 0.05 mm (0.002 in) in thickness, and is characterized by extreme resistance to wear and corrosion; it penetrates the metal, and treated parts have similar properties even below the surface to a certain depth. The Tenifer process produces a matte gray-colored, non-glare surface with a 64 Rockwell C hardness rating (by comparison, an industrial diamond has a rating of 80 HRC) and a 99% resistance to salt water corrosion (which meets or exceeds stainless steel specifications), making the PPS particularly suitable for individuals carrying the pistol concealed as the highly chloride-resistant finish allows the pistol to better endure the effects of perspiration.

PPS pistols are delivered in a polymer pistol case containing; the pistol, 2 backstraps of different sizes, 2 magazine (small and medium), magazine loader, instruction manual, warranty papers, factory test target showing 5 shots fired at 15 m (16 yd) distance and an envelope with the case of the proof round fired during the proof test at the C.I.P. accredited Beschussamt Ulm (Proof House Ulm).

=== Barrel ===
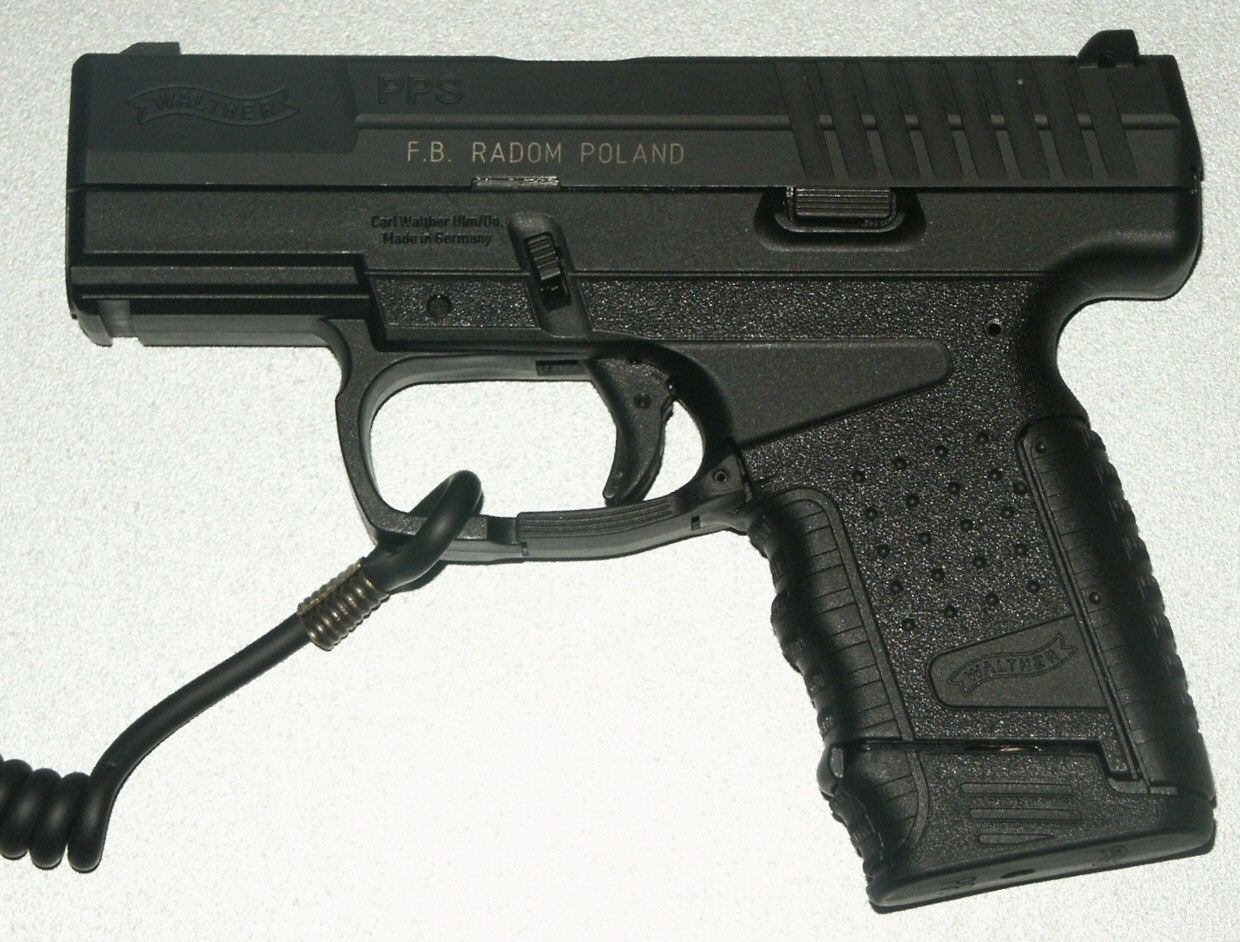
PPS made under licence in Poland by Fabryka Broni Radom.

The PPS M1 pistol has a traditional barrel with conventional (spiral grooves and lands) rifling, and PPS M2 has polygonal rifling.

=== Safety ===
The PPS features three safeties (trigger safety, internal firing pin safety and QuickSafe feature) of which the external integrated trigger safety inner lever mechanism contained within the trigger serves as an additional passive drop safety. The pistol has a loaded chamber indicator in the form of a witness opening at the top of the slide/ejection port. By looking into this opening the user can see if a cartridge is present in the chamber.

=== Feeding ===
The PPS feeds from single stack magazines of varying capacity. The various magazine capacities are achieved by small, medium (+1) or large (+2) magazine floorplates. The small magazine is flush with grip bottom. The extended +1 and +2 floorplates integrate with the gripframe adding finger rest space for better grip. The magazines are made of steel for Walther by the Italian subcontractor MEC-GAR and have an anti friction coating for easy loading and anti-corrosion and witness holes to view how many rounds are in the magazine. A steel spring drives a plastic follower. The standard PPS magazines weigh 43 g (1.5 oz) (6/5 rounds of 9×19mm Parabellum/.40 S&W), 59 g (2.1 oz) (7/6 rounds of 9×19mm Parabellum/.40 S&W) and 67 g (2.4 oz) (8/7 rounds of 9×19mm Parabellum/.40 S&W). After the last cartridge has been fired, the magazine follower exerts upward pressure on the slide stop causing it to engage the slide stop notch thereby holding it in the "open" position.

The slide stop release lever is located on the left side of the frame directly beneath the slide and can be manipulated by the thumb of the shooting hand for right handed shooters. When a cartridge is present in the chamber the pistol can be fired without the need of having a magazine inserted in the weapon. Walther does however offer a magazine disconnect as an optional safety on some PPS pistols that will prevent discharging the pistol without a magazine present in the pistol.

Empty magazines are released by depressing ambidextrous magazine release levers incorporated into the trigger guard.

=== Sights ===
The standard low profile iron sights are made of steel. The rear sighting element is adjustable for windage by drifting and the front sighting element can be adjusted for elevation by exchanging the front sight. For this Walther offers front sight elements in four differing heights. The standard sights have 3 high-contrast dots which serve as contrast enhancements and have been painted with afterglow paint to aid target acquisition under unfavourable lighting conditions. Tritium illuminated night sights are also available. Due to product evolution in the Walther pistol line the PPS maintains compatibility with Walther P99 sights. The sight radius is 137 mm (5.4 in).

=== Overpressure ammunition ===
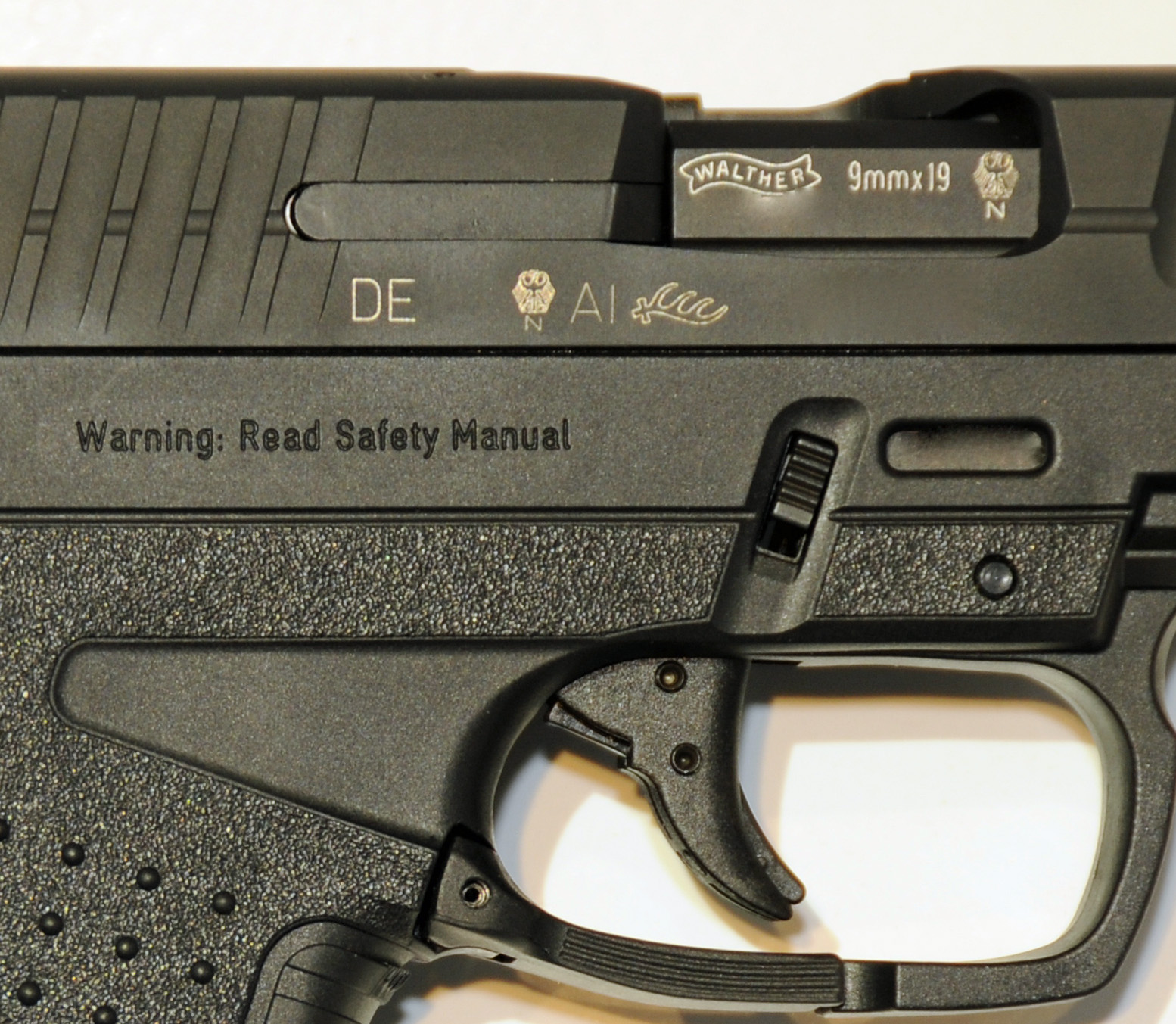
German definitive smokeless powder proof marks (eagle over N figure) issued by the Beschussamt Ulm C.I.P.-accredited Proof House (antlers figure) on a Walther PPS pistol.

According to Walther, “Plus-P” (+P) overpressure ammunition may affect the wear characteristics of the PPS pistol or exceed the margin of safety. Use of “Plus-P” ammunition may, according to Walther, result in the need for more frequent service. Walther recommends against the use of “Plus-P-Plus” (+P+) overpressure ammunition in Walther firearms. This marking on the ammunition designates that it exceeds established industry standards, but the designation does not represent defined pressure limits and therefore such ammunition may vary significantly as to the pressures generated.

=== Accessories ===
Factory accessories include: fixed metal three-dot iron sights, fixed tritium night sights, adjustable sports iron sights, adjustable optic fibre iron sights, laser pointers, tactical lights, magazine flashlight adapters, holsters, magazines, and magazine loaders are offered as factory accessories.

== Variants ==
Currently four PPS models are available for purchase in the United States. Two are chambered in 9×19mm Parabellum with part number WAP10001 for the standard model and part number WAP10006 for the Massachusetts compliant model and two in .40 S&W with the part number WAP10002 and part number WAP10007 for the Massachusetts compliant model. Previously another was available in 9 mm which had "First Edition" printed on the slide and a blue-tinted frame (part number WAWAP10003FC). U.S. models are currently sold in plastic hard cases with both backstraps and two magazines (7 and 8 round capacity in 9mm, 6 and 7 round capacity in .40 S&W).

=== M2 series ===
In 2016 the PPS M2 chambered in 9×19mm Parabellum was introduced, and as of 2018, it has never been available in any other caliber. The PPS M2 general ergonomic design shares similarities with the Walther PPQ M2 series. Dimensionally the M2 series are similar to the original PPS variants. The PPS M2 features a push button magazine release, front and rear slide serrations and a redesigned grip. The PPS M2 has a trigger travel of approximately 6 mm (0.2 in) and a trigger pull of approximately 27 N (6.1 lb_{f}). The PPS M2 is also available in an LE edition with phosphoric iron sights. The magazines are available in 6, 7 and 8 round capacity in 9×19mm Parabellum and 5, 6 and 7 round capacity in .40 S&W. Additionally, the PPS M2 magazines are not compatible with the original PPS magazines. The integrated mounting MIL-STD-1913 (Picatinny) rail for attaching accessories, such as a tactical light or laser pointer found on the PPS is omitted on the PPS M2.

Walther Arms issued a safety recall in 2018 for some early production PPS M2 pistols (from serial number AN3020 to AU7502) when it discovered that some could fire under certain conditions when dropped. The safety upgrade is free, while upgraded pistols will have a dot milled onto the back side of the magazine well opening (as illustrated on their website).

== Slide stop modification ==
Walther modified the slide stop lever and an accompanying spring on the PPS pistols to improve reliability. Early PPS pistols can be modified but need an enlargement of a hole in the pistol gripframe before the new style slide stop and spring can be installed. For this the pistol has to be sent in to the Walther customer service.
