= Proof test =

Form of stress test

A proof test is a form of stress test to demonstrate the fitness of a load-bearing or impact-experiencing structure. An individual proof test may apply only to the unit tested, or to its design in general for mass-produced items. Such a structure is often subjected to loads above those expected in actual use, demonstrating safety and design margin. Proof testing is nominally a nondestructive test, particularly if both design margins and test levels are well-chosen. However, unit failures are by definition considered to have been destroyed for their originally-intended use and load levels.

Proof tests may be performed before a new design or unit is allowed to enter service, or perform additional uses, or to verify that an existing unit is still functional as intended.

== Applications of proof testing ==
=== Industrial tooling ===
Cranes and derricks are proof tested when called on for potentially dangerous load levels or high-valued cargoes. Similarly, items which are smaller and more common (rope and cable, slings, shackles and eyes) are nevertheless in the load path and a failure risk if not tested. Testing generally involves lifting weight or drawing tension equal to or greater than design levels.

=== Turbomachinery ===
An overspeed proof test involves physically running the machine at high speed up to the test speed. This may be done during manufacture as an initial proof test. Physical overspeed tests may be periodically undertaken on some machines to verify operation of the overspeed protection systems.

Operation at speeds above the normal operating speed can greatly increase stress levels in rotating parts. Failing flywheels, rotors, etc. may present a shrapnel risk in case of a failure.

=== Swords ===
Historically, swords would be proof tested by impact before issuance- the "British test".

=== Pressure vessels ===
Vessels which may be a failure risk, such as utility-scale water towers, chemical-handling equipment, or very-high-pressure storage tanks, may be proof tested. Rocket stage tankage, being high-valued and often the vehicle's primary structure, are proof-tested when redesigned, and may be tested at the unit level. Testing involves exposure to higher gauge pressures than design levels, or in some cases, pulling harder vacuum.

=== Firearms ===
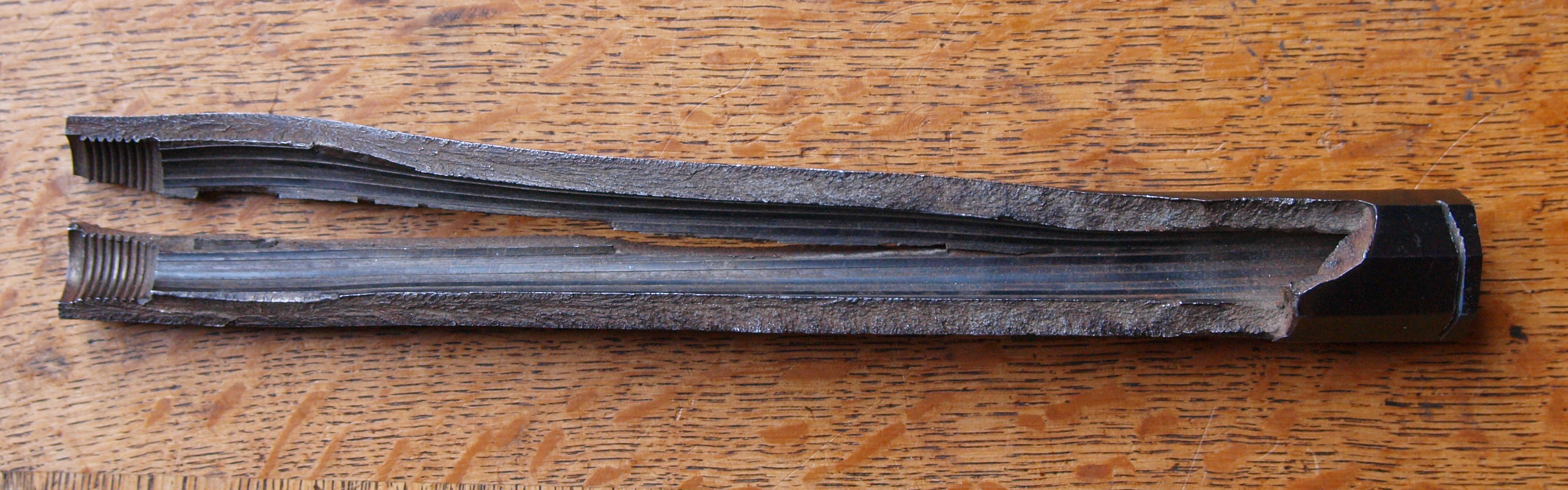
Catastrophically burst barrel of a muzzle loader pistol replica. During proofing the barrel was loaded with nitrocellulose powder instead of black powder. The barrel was not able to withstand the higher pressures of the modern propellant.

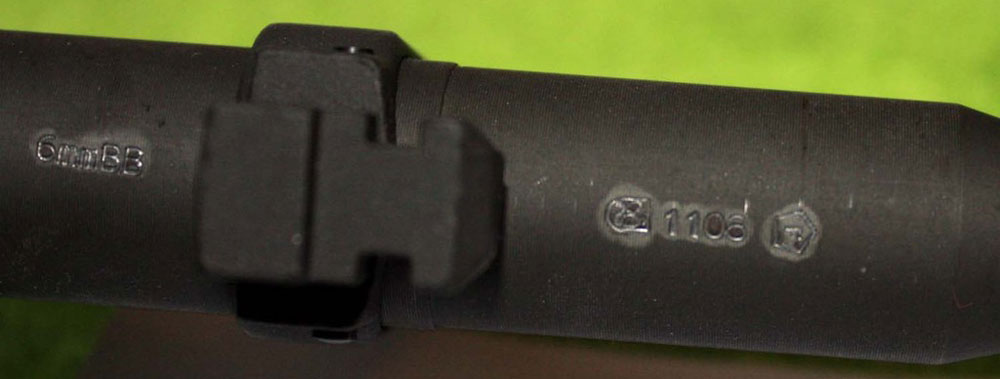
Airsoft gun with German F proof mark and sign from the Firearms Testing Commission Suhl

A firearm's chamber and barrel become pressure vessels for brief periods. In firearm terminology, a proof test is a test wherein a deliberately over-pressured round is fired from a firearm in order to verify that the firearm is not defective and will not explode on firing. The firearm is inspected after the test, and if it is found to be in sound condition, then it is marked with a "proof mark" to indicate that it has been proofed (not proven). In many jurisdictions a proof test and valid proof mark are required for the sale of firearms.

A "proof round" is an ammunition assembly designed to be used in proof testing; this can use a fixed cartridge, a semi-fixed cartridge, or separately loaded projectile, charge and primer. A "proof shot" is a special projectile used in a proof round or other projectile weapons, electromagnetic guns for example. Small arms proof rounds resemble normal cartridges, though they will typically bear special markings to prevent them from being confused for standard cartridges. Large calibre arms, such as artillery, will in general use an inert solid projectile (the proof shot); although water, sand or iron (powder) filled versions can be found for testing recoil systems.

==== Testing methodology ====
For both small arms and heavy weapons, the gun is fired remotely and then examined; if undamaged, it is assumed to be safe for normal use and a proof mark is added to the barrel. In the case of revolvers or other multi-chamber firearms, each chamber must be proof tested before the firearm may be marked. Examination of the firearm may be as simple as visually inspecting it (defective components may fail in a spectacular manner, resulting in an explosion of the firearm) or may involve more in-depth examination, at the option of the tester.

==== Proof marks ====
A proof mark is a mark specific to the manufacturer, importer, or testing facility that is performing the test. It generally takes the form of a stamp that makes an impression in the metal. Since proof marks are unique and nearly universal, they are often used to identify the origins of firearms that lack normal manufacturer's markings, such as military weapons, which are often produced by large numbers of different manufacturers.

==== Small arms proof testing ====
A small arms proof round is loaded to a higher than normal service pressure, stressing both the gun barrel and breech during firing. This can be due to a heavy projectile fired using the standard propelling charge, the standard projectile fired with a different propellant type or weight, or combinations of charge and bullet weight to give the required proofing pressure. Minimum proof testing pressures are specified by the owner of the cartridge specification, such as C.I.P. or SAAMI for most commercial cartridges or NATO EPVAT testing for appropriate military cartridges.

An example proofing round for the .50 BMG (12.7 × 99 mm) is the "cartridge, caliber .50, test, high pressure, M1". This uses the standard-weight .50 BMG M1 round propellant (240 gr of WC860), but a bullet weighing 999 gr (+/- 11 gr). The M1 proof round gives a proofing pressure of ~65,000 psi, 11,000 psi (~17%) above the standard service pressure.

==== Proof testing in C.I.P. regulated countries ====
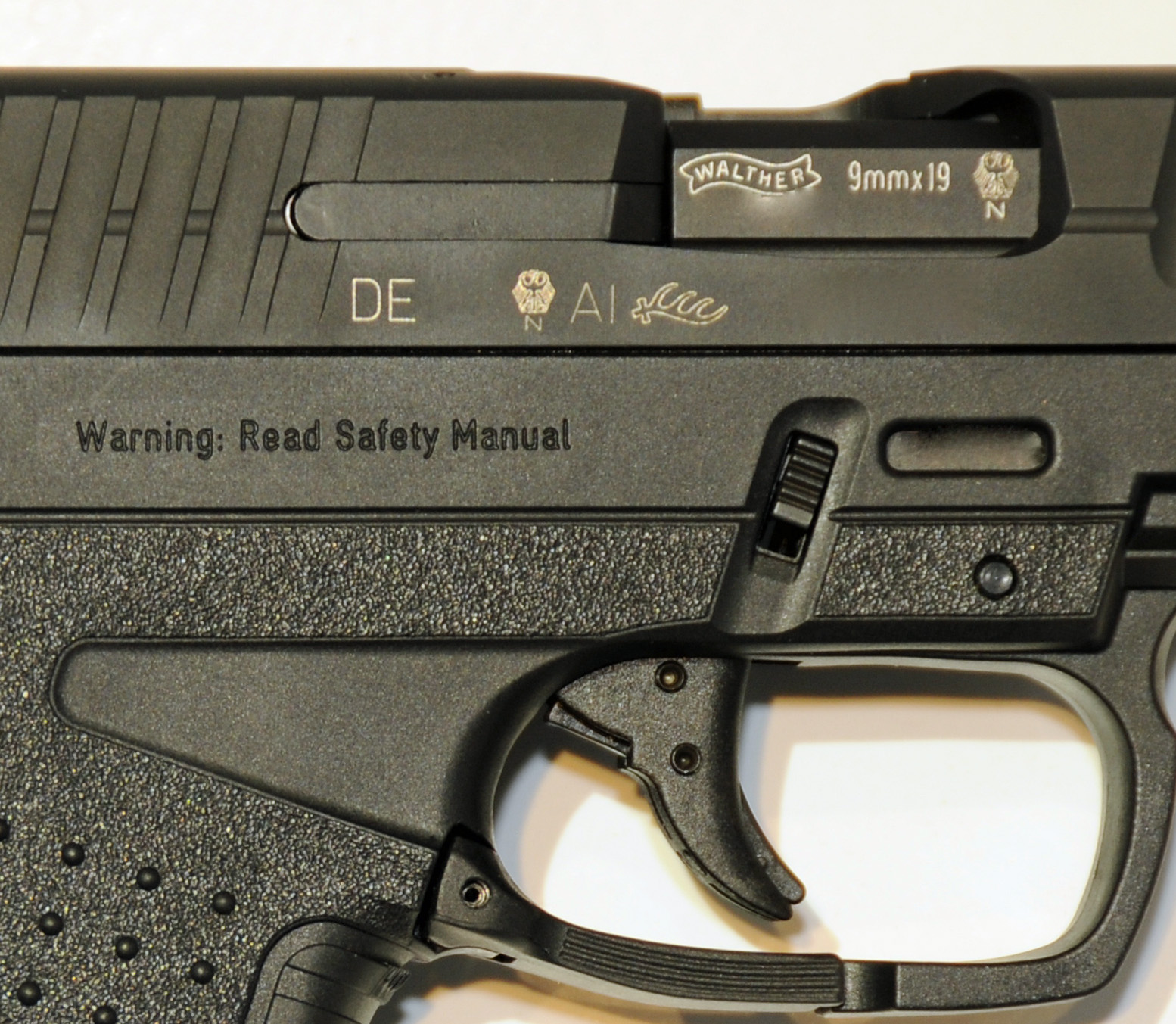
German definitive smokeless powder proof marks (eagle over N figure) issued by the Beschussamt Ulm C.I.P. accredited proof house (antlers figure) on a Walther PPS pistol

In C.I.P. member states every civil firearm has to be professionally proofed in accredited proof houses before it can be sold to consumers. The proofsign may permit identification of the period of time in which it was used. Some of the signs actually used are:

- Proofhouse Cologne since 1991 German final proofmark for test with nitropropellant:
- Proofhouse Ferlach
- Proofhouse Vienna
- Proofhouse Abu Dhabi

The standard proof test consists of firing two overloaded cartridges that produce 25% more chamber pressure than the C.I.P. specified maximum pressure limit for the same cartridge in its commercial version. The standard proof of pistol, revolver and rimfire cartridges is performed with overloaded cartridges that produce 30% more chamber pressure than the C.I.P maximum pressure limit for the same cartridge in its commercial version. There are only two overloaded firings to avoid excessive stress to the arm, especially the barrel which is the main part suffering this overload beside the chamber (when not part of the barrel) and the locking mechanism. After the test, the arm is disassembled by the proof house technicians for nondestructive testing looking for magnetic flux leakage through fluoroscopic lamp in a dark room. Many manufacturers package the casings from a firearm's proof ammunition in a sealed envelope accompanying the firearm so that authorities in C.I.P.-signatory states and civilian purchasers in other countries can conduct an independent examination if they desire.

Before the year 2006 the standard test consisted of firing two overloaded cartridges producing 30% more chamber pressure than the C.I.P. specified maximum chamber gas pressure limit for the same cartridge in its commercial version.

Voluntarily testing beyond the current legally required standard test benchmark is often also possible for consumers who intend the use their firearms under extreme conditions (hot climates, long strings of shots, etc.). In case a firearm passes such a proof-test a pass mark termed superior proof mark is stamped in every successfully tested firearm.

==== Proof test differences ====
Under SAAMI proof test procedures, for bottlenecked cases the centre of the transducer is located .175" behind the shoulder of the case for large diameter (.250") transducers and .150" for small diameter (.194") transducers. For straight cases the centre of the transducer is located one-half of the transducer diameter plus .005" behind the base of the seated bullet. Small transducers are used when the case diameter at the point of measurement is less than .35".

Under C.I.P. proof test standards a drilled case is used and the piezo measuring device (transducer) will be positioned at a distance of 25 mm from the breech face when the length of the cartridge case permits that, including limits. When the length of the cartridge case is too short, pressure measurement will take place at a cartridge specific defined shorter distance from the breech face depending on the dimensions of the case.

The difference in the location of the pressure measurement gives different results than the C.I.P. standard.

==== Large caliber proof testing ====
The test of a large-caliber weapon system primarily covers the strength of the barrel, breech and recoil systems. The proof shot has to resemble the resistance to motion (bore/rifling friction, shot start pressures, etc.) and profile to the propellant gases that the actual service projectile will give. For this reason, proof shots for APFSDS rounds have fin units and all must have profiles behind the obturator the same as the shot they are emulating. Crack analysis is often undertaken on large-caliber weapons after testing has been carried out.

The proof shot is normally a high-drag projectile since its job is over once it has left the muzzle of the gun. A high-drag projectile is advantageous for two reasons; first, it reduces the impact velocity when fired against an earth or sand backstop, and second, it reduces the range if no backstop is used. Excessive range can be a very problematic when firing any large-caliber round; safety traces can often exceed the bylaw areas of the firing range, so range reduction is imperative. This is even more of a problem when high velocity, low drag rounds such as APDS or APFSDS are used.

Although proof shots are used in the service proof of barrels before use, the vast majority are used in propellant charge design. Proof shot emulating APFSDS rounds are also used in stabilizing-fin SoD trials, which is often combined with a charge design trial.

==== Instrumentation used in proofing ====
When running a charge development, or strength of design (SoD), trial, the charge mass and service pressure will gradually be worked up to the required proofing pressure of the weapon system. Readings will be taken of chamber pressure by copper crusher, or piezo electric gauges and velocity by Doppler radar (in-bore or aeroballistic), or photocell counter chronographs. In addition strain and temperature readings may also be recorded. If required, high speed photography (synchroballistic photography, high speed digital stills, head on cine, or flight follower) may also be used.

==== Reproof ====
Reproof is a further test of a gun after its original proof, which may be necessary when changes are made or due to inadequacy of the original proof.

=== Vehicles ===
Vehicle systems or entire vehicles may be proof-tested. As failure of an aircraft structure or substructure may be catastrophic, demonstration of designs or of in-service units is performed via proof testing. Failure of sail rigging is no longer as catastrophic, but may still lead to damage, injury and loss of vehicle functions.

=== Industrial leak testing ===
The leak testing is the proceedings to verify and measure the pneumatic tightness of the produced components. This phase of the industrial process is called leak test or leakage detection

== See also ==
- London Proof House, firearms proofing facility and home of the Worshipful Company of Gunmakers
- Birmingham Proof House, a historic firearm proofing facility

== Bibliography ==
- Edoardo Mori: Guida alla identificazione dei marchi ufficiali sulle armi da fuoco (Identification of proof marks and other markings on firearms), 2nd edition, earmi.it, 2015, (multilingual, 101 pages, 550 pictures), online-PDF 3,5 MB.
- Greener, William: Gunnery in 1858, Chapter VI, The Proof of Gun Barrels, Smith, Elder and Co., London, 1858, P. 243 ff. (online archive.org)
- Tom Warlow (2016). Firearms, the Law, and Forensic Ballistics (Third ed.). CRC Press. ISBN 978-1-4398-1828-2.
