= Sporting Arms and Ammunition Manufacturers' Institute =

Association of American manufacturers of firearms, ammunition, and components

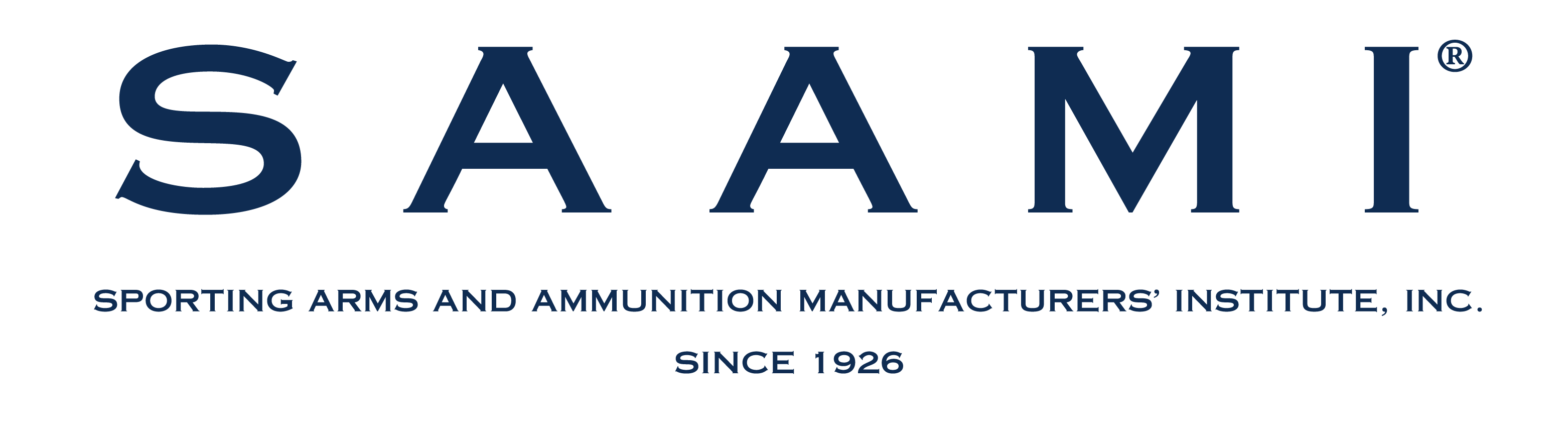
- Formation: 1926
- Type: Standards organization
- Headquarters: Shelton, Connecticut, US
- Official language: English
- Website: Official website

The Sporting Arms and Ammunition Manufacturers' Institute (SAAMI, pronounced "Sammy") is an association of American manufacturers of firearms, ammunition, and components. SAAMI is an accredited standards developer that publishes several American National Standards that provide safety, reliability, and interchangeability standards for commercial manufacturers of firearms, ammunition, and components. In addition, SAAMI publishes information on the safe and responsible transportation, storage, and use of those products.

== History ==
The origins of SAAMI date back to World War I and the Society of American Manufacturers of Small Arms and Ammunition (SAMSAA). In 1913, the US War Department encouraged the firearms and ammunition industry to establish an organization to share new technology and establish common standards for small arms and ammunition. SAMSAA was officially formed in 1918, however became inactive by the early 1920s.

By the mid-1920s, the United States was still suffering the shortage of World War I strategic materials including brass, copper, and lead. By 1925, the U.S. Department of Commerce recognized the need for a revival of an organization like SAMSAA and at the same time was encouraging ammunition makers to participate in a product simplification program. This was intended to reduce waste of capital, material shortages, storage and transportation needs. In 1926, at the time of official founding of the Sporting Arms and Ammunition Manufacturer's Institute, over 4,000 different shotshell loads were on the market. The government sanctioned program- conducted by SAAMI- eliminated more than 95% of them. In metallic cartridges the nearly 350 available loads offered were reduced 70%, often accomplished by reconciling cartridges with multiple names for essentially the same design.

In 1928, with market hunting and habitat destruction reducing wildlife populations to record lows, SAAMI funded Aldo Leopold's wildlife studies which resulted in the books An American Game Policy and Game Management. This book became the foundation for modern wildlife management. In addition, SAAMI financially supported the Game Conservation Institute in Clinton, New Jersey, which was the first school providing wildlife management education for state and federal regulators.

In 1937, SAAMI was instrumental in gaining support of the firearms and ammunition industry for the passage for the Pittman-Robertson Federal Aid in Wildlife Restoration Act. This legislation mandated the 11 percent excise tax on firearms and ammunition to be solely used for wildlife restoration and related purposes.

In the 1940s, SAAMI began publishing a series of informational booklets for educating the public on safe firearm and ammunition use, handling, and storage. Most notably, SAAMI published “The Ten Commandments of Safety, Published in the Interest of Making and Keeping Shooting a Safe Sport” millions of which have been distributed.

In 1961, SAAMI established the National Shooting Sports Foundation (NSSF) as an independent organization to promote, protect, and preserve hunting and shooting in the United States. By establishing the NSSF as a separate organization, SAAMI was able to focus on its mission of publishing technical standards for firearm and ammunition safety, interchangeability, reliability and quality.

In the 1970s, SAAMI became an accredited standards developer for the American National Standards Institute (ANSI) and turned its technical standards for firearms and ammunition into five American National Standards. Also, during this time SAAMI started the transition from using a copper crusher chamber pressure measurement system for ammunition to piezoelectric transducer chamber pressure measurement systems.

In the 1980s, SAAMI conducted extensive testing of the reaction of sporting ammunition in various transportation accident scenarios. The resulting data was submitted to the US Department of Transportation in support of the inclusion of ammunition in the ORM-D shipping classification. In addition, SAAMI produced the first “Sporting Ammunition and the Fire Fighter” video, providing technical and safety information on fighting fires involving sporting arms ammunition. The video was updated in 2012 in cooperation with the International Association of Fire Chiefs to reflect the latest changes to technology.

In 2005, SAAMI was accredited as a Non-Governmental Organization (NGO) with Consultative Status at the United Nations (UN) Economic and Social Council (ECOSOC). Also, around this time period, SAAMI launched a partnership with the Commission Internationale Permanente pour l’Epreuve des Armes à Feu Portatives (“Permanent International Commission for the Proof of Small Arms,” C.I.P.) to harmonize the standards between the two organizations.

In 2012, SAAMI successfully led the effort in the UN Sub-Committee on the Transportation of Dangerous Goods to modify the Limited Quantities (LQ) classification to match the US ORM-D classification, mitigating any impact of the planned phaseout of the ORM-D classification.

== SAAMI Standards ==
SAAMI is an accredited American National Standards Institute (ANSI) standards developer. In that capacity, SAAMI publishes five American National Standards that provide safety, reliability, and interchangeability standards for commercial manufacturers of firearms, ammunition, and components. SAAMI's standards are voluntary compliance standards which contain cartridge and chamber drawings, pressure and velocity standards, measurement procedures, equipment, and safety testing procedures. Currently published standards are as follows:

- SAAMI Z299.1 – 2018 - Voluntary Industry Performance Standards for Pressure and Velocity of Rimfire Sporting Ammunition for the Use of Commercial Manufacturers
- SAAMI Z299.2 – 2019 - Voluntary Industry Performance Standards for Pressure and Velocity of Shotshell Ammunition for the Use of Commercial Manufacturers.
- SAAMI Z299.3 – 2022 - Voluntary Industry Performance Standards for Pressure and Velocity of Centerfire Pistol and Revolver Ammunition for the Use of Commercial Manufacturers
- SAAMI Z299.4 – 2015 - Voluntary Industry Performance Standards for Pressure and Velocity of Centerfire Rifle Ammunition for the Use of Commercial Manufacturers
- SAAMI Z299.5 – 2016 - Voluntary Industry Performance Standards Criteria for Evaluation of New Firearms Designs Under Conditions of Abusive Mishandling for the Use of Commercial Manufacturers

== Published Resources ==
SAAMI publishes a variety of information on its website for the benefit of the firearms, ammunition, and components industry and the general public.

=== Technical ===
SAAMI publishes the following technical resources:

- SAAMI Generally Accepted Firearms and Ammunition Interchangeability
- SAAMI Generally Accepted Cartridge and Chambers
- Recoil Formulae
- Glossary of Industry Terms
- Technical FAQs

=== Transportation and Storage ===
- Transport Data Sheets
- Glossary of Transport Terms

=== Publications and Advisories ===
- Firearms Safety Rules
- Advisories on firearms and ammunition that have been submerged in water.
- Informational publications on, range cleaning, ammunition storage, smokeless powder, primers, and sporting firearms.
- Sporting Ammunition and the Fire Fighter: What Happens When Ammo Burns?
- Smokeless Powder and The Fire Service

== SAAMI Committees ==
SAAMI's work is broken up by committee, each with a specific charter.

=== Technical Committees ===
SAAMI's Joint Technical Committee (JTC) is made up of three sections, Ammunition, Firearms, and Muzzleloader. The technical committee is responsible for developing and maintaining SAAMI's American National Standards. In addition, the committee publishes numerous technical publications and advisories, FAQs, and glossary terms. The JTC also works extensively with the Commission Internationale Permanente pour l’Epreuve des Armes à Feu Portatives (“Permanent International Commission for the Proof of Small Arms” (C.I.P.) to harmonize the standards between the two organizations.

=== Logistics and Regulatory Affairs Committee ===
The SAAMI Logistics and Regulatory Affairs Committee (SLARAC) is responsible for keeping members up to date on changes to transportation and storage regulations. The committee also provides science-based information to both international and domestic regulators. Committee members are part of SAAMI's delegation to the United Nations Committee of Experts on the Transportation of Dangerous Goods (TDG) and the United Nations Committee of Experts on the Globally Harmonized System of Classification and Labeling of Chemicals (GHS). In addition, the committee participates in industry standard setting organizations such as the International Code Council, International Fire Code, National Fire Protection Association, and International Society of Explosives Engineers.

=== Legal & Legislative ===
SAAMI's Legal and Legislative Affairs Committee is responsible for tracking changes to product liability law and legislation that would impact firearm, ammunition, and component manufacturers. The committee also provides technical information to public policy makers.

=== International Affairs Committee ===
SAAMI's International Affairs Committee is responsible for tracking international developments that would impact firearm, ammunition, and component manufactures. SAAMI is an accredited Non-Governmental Organization (NGO) with Consultative Status at the United Nations Economic and Social Council (ECOSOC). SAAMI serves as a resource to various committee members for technical information on firearms, ammunition, and components. SAAMI is also a member of the World Forum on Shooting Activities.

== SAAMI vs. C.I.P. Standards ==
There are two internationally recognized sporting arms and ammunition standard setting organizations, SAAMI and Commission Internationale Permanente pour l'Epreuve des Armes à Feu Portatives (French for "Permanent international commission for testing portable firearms") commonly abbreviated and referred to simply as “C.I.P.”

SAAMI and C.I.P. have had a long-term working relationship to harmonize standards between the two organizations. Prior to the establishment of this relationship, standards were developed independently which, in some cases, resulted in minor differences between the organizations’ standards.

=== Pressure Measurement Differences ===
For sporting arms centerfire cartridges there are three principal pressure measurement protocols, conformal piezoelectric transducer (SAAMI), drilled case piezoelectric transducer (C.I.P.), and copper crusher (SAAMI & C.I.P.). The copper crusher is in limited use due to the increased efficiency of measuring pressure with a piezoelectric transducer-based data acquisition system. The two different piezoelectric pressure measurement protocols used by SAAMI and C.I.P. yield slightly different numerical values of pressure for any given cartridge. Current practices instituted in both organizations have been undertaken to ensure that pressure limits initially introduced by either SAAMI or C.I.P. are equivalent the other organization's standard.

== See also ==
- List of modern armament manufacturers
- Small arms ammunition pressure testing
- Overpressure ammunition
- CIP, an international standardization organization for firearm cartridges
- NATO EPVAT testing
- DEVA, a German firearms test institute
- Wildcat cartridge
