= NATO EPVAT testing =

Ammunition safety control procedure

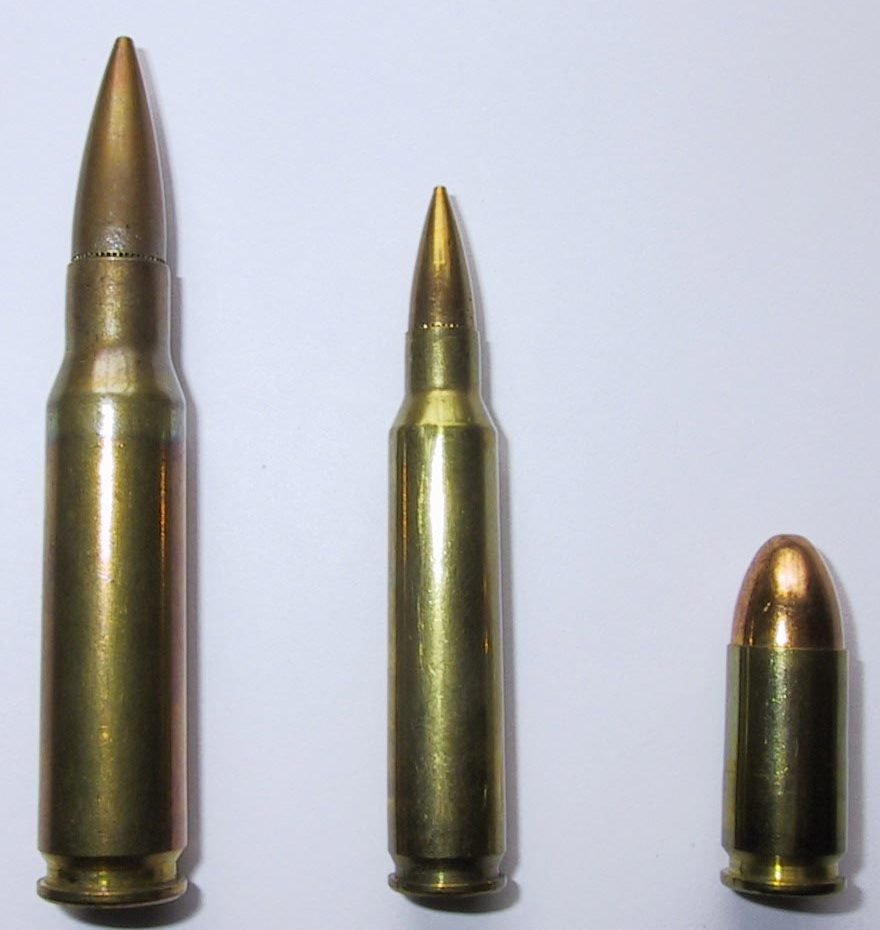
Left to right: 7.62 mm NATO, 5.56 mm NATO and 9 mm NATO ammunition.

NATO EPVAT testing is one of the three recognized classes of procedures used in the world to control the safety and quality of firearms ammunition.

Beside this, there are also the Commission internationale permanente pour l'épreuve des armes à feu portatives (C.I.P.) class of procedures and the Sporting Arms and Ammunition Manufacturers' Institute (SAAMI) class of procedures.

EPVAT Testing is described in unclassified documents by NATO, more precisely by the AC/225 Army Armaments Group (NAAG). It was accepted as NATO Standardization Agreement STANAG 4823 and Allied Engineering Publication 97 (AEP-97) in November 2020.

EPVAT is an abbreviation for "Electronic Pressure, Velocity and Action Time" (French "Pression électronique, vitesse et durée d'action"). Action Time here means the (short amount of) time required between the ignition of the primer and the projectile leaving the barrel. This is a comprehensive procedure for testing ammunition using state-of-the-art instruments and computers. The procedure itself was initially described in NATO document AC/225 (Com. III/SC.1)D/200.

Unlike the C.I.P. procedures aiming only at the user's safety, the NATO procedures for ammunition testing also include comprehensive functional quality testing in relation with the intended use. That is, not only the soldier's safety is looked at, but also their capacity to incapacitate the enemy. As a result, for every ammunition order by NATO, a complete acceptance approval on both safety and functionality is performed by both NATO and the relevant ammunition manufacturers in a contradictory fashion.

For this, a highly accurate and indisputable protocol has been defined by NATO experts using a system of reference cartridges.

The civilian organisations C.I.P. and SAAMI use less comprehensive test procedures than NATO, but NATO test centres have the advantage that only a few chamberings are in military use. The C.I.P. and SAAMI proof houses must be capable of testing hundreds of different chamberings requiring many different test barrels, etc.

== NATO Reference cartridges system ==
In this system, the ammunition manufacturers, in close cooperation with NATO, have set aside a batch (also termed "lot") of ammunition they consider to be of very good quality and representative of ammunition that should be delivered to the armies in the following years. This batch is maintained at approved NATO test centres and distributed to the manufacturers involved. When a new batch (lot) is delivered, a set of 20 reference cartridges are fired to see how they behave with the local equipment and with the current atmospheric conditions. Results are then compared to the reference values, as maintained by NATO and correctors (delta values) are computed. Then, samples of the current batch (lot) of ammunition are fired and the correctors are applied on the measured value giving a result "comparable" to the reference itself.

This test is performed under normal conditions at 21 °C (70 °F), but also by simulating cold polar −54 °C (−65 °F) or hot desert 52 °C (126 °F) conditions using special cooling equipment and ovens to cool or heat the ammunition under test to the appropriate levels of humidity and temperatures required.

== Proofing ==
The minimum proof and performance requirements for small arms ammunition of NATO calibres are covered in STANAGs as follows:

- 5.56 mm. STANAG 4172 and NATO Manual of Proof and Inspection AC/225 (LG/3-SG/1) D/8.
- 7.62 mm. STANAG 2310 and NATO Manual of Proof and Inspection AC/225 (LG/3-SG/1) D/9.
- 9 mm. STANAG 4090 and NATO Manual of Proof and Inspection AC/225 (P111-SP1) D/170(REV).
- 12.7 mm. STANAG 4383 and NATO Manual of Proof and Inspection AC/225 (LG/3-SG/1) D/11.

Each weapon and component considered vulnerable to the effects of a rapid change in pressure, for example barrels, breech blocks and bolts, will be tested by firing one dry round at a corrected minimum of 25% over-pressure and one oiled round at a corrected minimum of 25% over-pressure. 25% over-pressure means 25% in excess of the Service Pressure (P_{max}). The Service Pressure is defined as the mean pressure generated by the Service Cartridge at a temperature of 21 °C (70 °F). Such a high pressure proof is conducted with both the weapon and ammunition conditioned to an ambient temperature of 21 °C (70 °F).

Each weapon will be individually tested, from an ammunition lot that produces a minimum corrected mean chamber pressure in accordance with the table below:

Corrected Proof Pressure Requirement (Service Pressure (P_{max}) + 25%)
Calibre	Specific Weapon Detail	Service Pressure P_{max} MPa / (psi)	Proof Round Pressure Requirement MPa / (psi)	Detailed Requirement for Proof Ammunition
5.56 mm (5.56×45mm NATO)	Designed to chamber NATO ammunition	430.00 (62,366)	537.50 (77,958)	Pressure recorded in NATO design EPVAT Barrel with Kistler 6215 Transducer, HPI GP6 Transducer or by equipment to Commission internationale permanente pour l'épreuve des armes à feu portatives (C.I.P.) requirements
7.62 mm (7.62×51mm NATO)	Designed to chamber NATO ammunition	415.00 (60,190)	519.00 (75,275)	Pressure recorded in NATO design EPVAT Barrel with Kistler 6215 Transducer, HPI GP6 Transducer or by equipment to C.I.P. requirements
9 mm (9×19mm NATO)	Designed to chamber NATO ammunition	252.00 (36,550)	315.00 (45,687)	Pressure recorded in C.I.P. design barrel at mid-case position
12.7 mm (12.7×99mm NATO)	Designed to chamber NATO ammunition	417.00 (60,481)	521.30 (75,608)	Pressure recorded in NATO design EPVAT Barrel with Kistler 6215 Transducer, HPI GP6 Transducer or by equipment to C.I.P. requirements
All other small arms ammunition for use in "non-NATO Chamber" weapons		As defined by the current C.I.P. legislation.	As defined by the current C.I.P. legislation	

The above proof round pressure requirements for the 9 mm and 12.7 mm rounds established by the British Ministry of Defence are higher than the current (2008) C.I.P. proof round pressure requirement legislation for the civilian equivalent 9 mm Parabellum (C.I.P. P_{max} rating 235 MPA / (34,083 psi) and .50 Browning (C.I.P. P_{max} rating 370 MPA / (53,663 psi) rounds. The 9×19mm NATO and 12.7×99mm NATO rounds can be regarded as overpressure ammunition

Unlike the civilian C.I.P. test procedures NATO EPVAT testing procedures for the "NATO chamberings" (besides 9×19mm) require the pressure sensor or transducer to be mounted ahead of the case mouth. The advantage of this mounting position is that there is no need to drill the cartridge case to mount the transducer. Drilling prior to firing is always a time-consuming process (fast quality control and feedback to production is essential during the ammunition manufacturing process). The disadvantage of this mount is that the pressure rises much faster than in a drilled cartridge case. This causes high frequency oscillations of the pressure sensor (approximately 200 kHz for a Kistler 6215 transducer), which requires electronic filtering with the drawback that filtering also affects the lower harmonics where a peak is found, causing a slight error in the measurement. This slight error is not always well understood, which causes significant discussion about the filter order, cutoff frequency, and type (Bessel or Butterworth).

Since NATO EPVAT uses technically differing proof test standards than SAAMI and C.I.P. do, EPVAT pressures cannot be directly compared with SAAMI and C.I.P. pressures.

== See also ==
- NATO
- NATO cartridge
- Small arms ammunition pressure testing
- Overpressure ammunition
- CIP, a European standardization organization for firearm cartridges
- SAAMI, an American standardization organization for firearm cartridges
- DEVA, a German firearms test institute
- Wildcat cartridge
