= Commission internationale permanente pour l'épreuve des armes à feu portatives =

Organisation on firearm testing safety

- C.I.P. logo
- Formation: 1914
- Type: Standards organization
- Headquarters: Brussels, Belgium
- Official language: French
- Website: www.cip-bobp.org

The Commission internationale permanente pour l'épreuve des armes à feu portatives (English: Permanent International Commission for the Proof of Small Arms), abbreviated C.I.P., is an international organisation which sets safety standards for firearms. (Note: The word portatives ("portable") refers to the fact that the C.I.P. tests small arms almost exclusively; it is ordinarily omitted from the English translation) As of 2025 its members are 16 national governments, of which 11 are European Union states. The C.I.P. safeguards all firearms and ammunition sold to civilian purchasers in member states.

To achieve this, the firearms are proof tested at C.I.P. accredited Proof Houses. The same applies for cartridges. At regular intervals, cartridges are tested against the C.I.P. pressure specifications at the ammunition manufacturing plants and at C.I.P. accredited Proof Houses.

== Quality control and proof process ==
Prior to firing cartridges in the firearm to be proofed, it is checked for its essential mechanical dimensions such all measures and tolerances in the chamber are verified. A visual inspection of the barrel is also performed. If the firearm passes these first steps, the standard proof takes place. The proof consist of firing two overloaded cartridges producing 25% more chamber pressure than the C.I.P maximum pressure limit for the same cartridge in its commercial version. For pistol, revolver, and rimfire cartridges the standard proof is performed with overloaded cartridges that produce 30% more chamber pressure than the C.I.P maximum pressure limit for the same cartridge in its commercial version. Voluntarily testing beyond the C.I.P. maximum pressure limit is also possible for consumers who intend to use their firearms under extreme conditions (hot climates, long series of shots, etc.). A proof mark is stamped in every successfully tested firearm. The C.I.P. does not test any further aspects regarding the correct functioning of the tested firearm. For example, aspects like projectile velocity, accuracy or the correct cycling of cartridges etc. are not part of the proofing process.

Primarily oriented towards the proof houses and manufacturers, the C.I.P. independently assesses, approves and publicizes manufacturer's data such as ammunition and chamber dimension specifications, maximum allowed chamber pressures, caliber nomenclature, etc. All this C.I.P. established data can be accessed by everyone.

Technical procedures describing how to perform proofing are also established by the C.I.P. and updates to the various test methods are issued in the form of "decisions". These decisions can also easily be obtained by everyone involved.

The C.I.P. formally distributes established data and decisions to the member states through diplomatic channels for ratification in each member state and publishing in their official journals. After official publication C.I.P. established data and decisions obtain(s) indisputable legal status in all C.I.P. member states.

Governmental organizations, like military and police forces and other firearms bearing public power agencies, from the C.I.P. member states are legally exempted from having to comply with C.I.P. rulings. This does not automatically imply that all firearms and ammunitions used by governmental organizations in C.I.P. member states are not C.I.P. compliant, since those organizations often choose to self-impose the relevant C.I.P. standards for their service firearms and ammunition.

== History ==
Firearm safety tests were made compulsory at the beginning of the 16th century, for instance in Styria (Austria) by decree of Maximilian I of Habsburg on 12 September 1501, 1589 in London (England), and in the 17th century in Liège (Belgium). At that time, proofing was executed by "proofers" at public places. All firearms of reputable brands were proofed this way. Proof testing is compulsory in Belgium since the decree of Maximilian Henry of Bavaria dated 10 May 1672. The Liège Proof House was created at this occasion. Progressively, national proof houses were set up in other countries and proof marks were introduced.

In 1914, the director of the Liège Proof House in Liège, Joseph Fraikin (director from 1908 to 1946), was the originator of the creation of the Permanent International Commission for Firearms Testing.

The C.I.P. has progressively established a set of uniform rules for the proofing of firearms and ammunition to ensure the reciprocal recognition of the proof marks of each member states.

A convention between 8 member states was signed in 1969, ratified and converted into law in each signing state, so that the rules can be enforced to assure that every firearm and cartridge on the market has successfully passed the compulsory proofing and approval.

In 2014, The C.I.P. celebrated the centenary of its foundation 15 July 1914. It was created just 13 days before the beginning of World War I on 28 July 1914.

== Member states ==
The current (2025) C.I.P. member states are:

- Austria
- Belgium
- Chile
- Czech Republic
- Finland
- France
- Germany
- Hungary
- Italy
- Portugal
- Russia
- Serbia
- Slovakia
- Spain
- United Arab Emirates
- United Kingdom

Most recent member States:
The United Arab Emirates became a member state on 9 April 2008. Local companies like Caracal International L.L.C. and ADCOM Manufacturing will benefit from a local proof house.

Portugal and Serbia became member States in 2025.

Former C.I.P. member state:

- Yugoslavia (formally dissolved in 1992)

The Permanent International Commission, confirming that the Socialist Federal Republic of Yugoslavia is no longer in existence, declared during the XXII Plenary Session that the proof marks of the Proof House at Kragujevac, Serbia, would no longer be recognised by the C.I.P. Member States with effect from 30 September 1992.

== Precepts and aims ==
The C.I.P. Convention has the following major precepts:

- There is reciprocal acceptance of each country's proof marks, certifying the identity of the firearms and the satisfactory performance of the tests performed in accordance with the pre-set regulations;
- Tests are standardised to guarantee safety and their application methods;
- At least one state-controlled national Proof House exists in each country;
- Every member country enacts a law which makes it compulsory to perform the tests according to the methods, limits and procedures established by the convention.

The main aims of the C.I.P. are as follows:

- To select test pressure barrels to measure firing pressure and define the measurement procedures for use by official Proof Houses to determine pressure generated by test cartridges and the commercial cartridges fired by hunting, sport and defensive firearms and in machine tools;
- To establish the kinds of procedures to be followed in the official tests used for firearms and machine tools to guarantee every degree of safety;
- To adopt the most modern measuring techniques for the arms and ammunition testing procedures;
- To encourage standardisation of chamber and cartridge dimensions, testing methods and ammunition testing procedures;
- To examine laws and regulations issued by member states regarding official tests for firearms and ammunition;
- To declare which countries act in accordance with standard tests and publish a schedule of the proof marks applied by the official testing centres of these countries;
- In accordance with the above, to retract declarations when necessary, and modify the schedule when conditions are no longer valid.

== Relations with manufacturers and internal functioning ==
The C.I.P. is an organisation whose members are state authorities but the operations of C.I.P. and its decisions are fully delegated to professional people active in the firearms industry. This includes all the proof house directors and their collaborators, ammunition manufacturers, machine manufacturers, gunsmiths, ballistic specialists and so on. Two sub-commissions exist within the commission itself. The first technical sub-commission deals with the definition of measuring methods and determine the acceptable values while the second regulatory sub-commission defines and express the conditions for new uniform rules. Working parties within these sub-commissions are also created each time a subject needs to be discussed and experts on the subject are invited to participate in relevant meetings. They meet as often as considered necessary at various places to work on the subject they have been assigned to and report to their sub-commissions. After that, the C.I.P. votes in Plenary Sessions on submitted sub-commission proposals, resulting in decisions and the publishing of them. This implies that all decisions made by C.I.P., although enforced by law after publication, are the result of a cautious consensus between sensible and knowledgeable people in this field.

== Firearms proofing ==
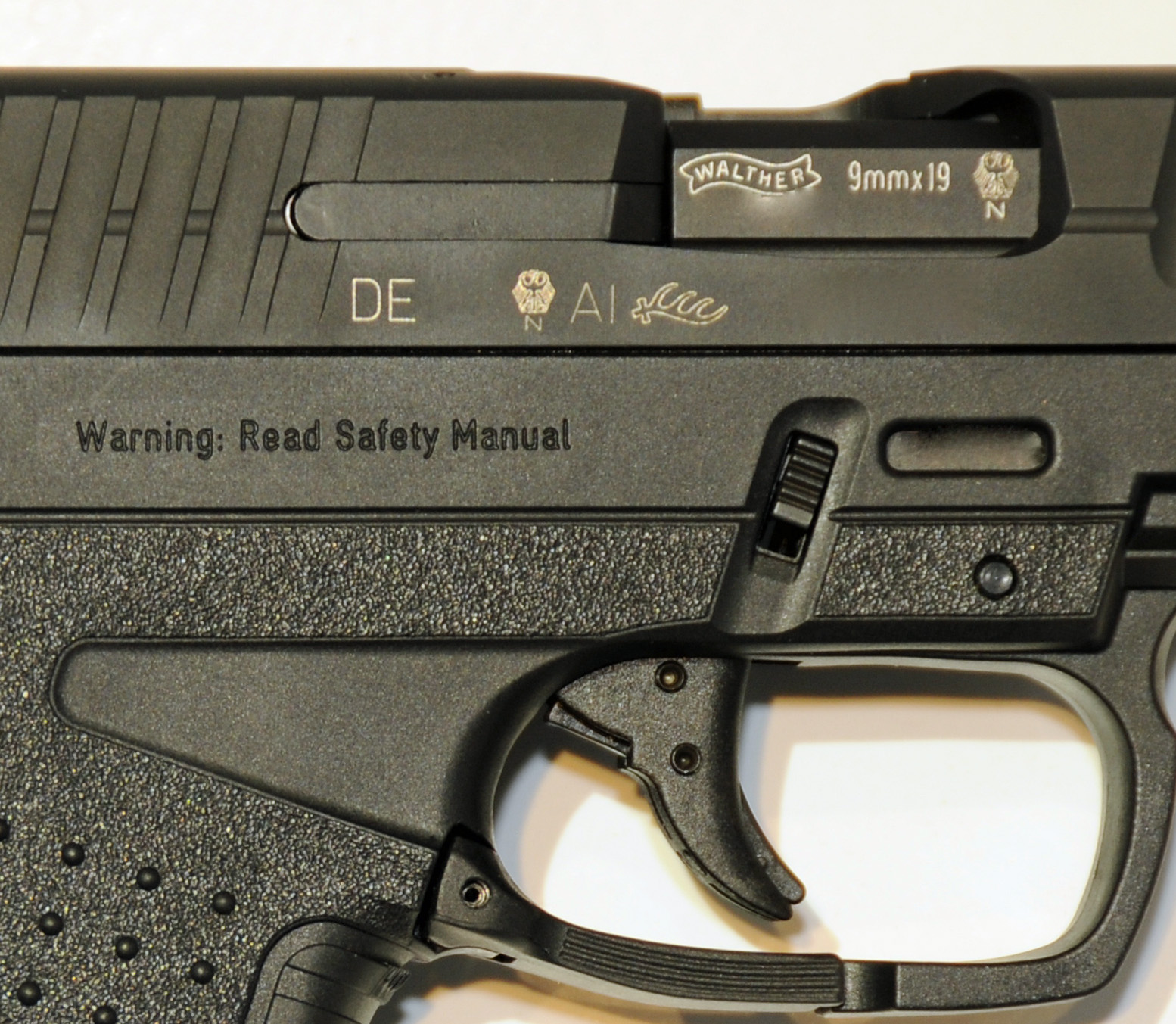
German definitive smokeless powder proof marks (eagle over N figure) issued by the Beschussamt Ulm C.I.P. accredited Proof House (antlers figure) on a Walther PPS pistol.

Small arms manufacturers and importers within C.I.P. member countries are obliged to request one of the accredited Proof Houses to perform proofing of all arms they manufacture or import. No small arm can be marketed in any C.I.P. member state without successful proofing in an accredited proof house, as regulated by the C.I.P.

After the successful proof test, two or three proof marks are applied to the main (highly stressed) parts of the arm: the barrel, the chamber (when not part of the barrel) and the locking mechanism.

These three essential parts are then weighed and their weight is recorded in a database together with the serial number.

Then a serial number indicating the year of proofing is marked on these parts. In case a firearm was voluntarily tested at a higher than required proof-test pressure superior proof marks are applied on the relevant parts.

Only after that is the arm released to the manufacturer or importer to sell or to deliver, if already sold.

== Ammunition approval ==
The C.I.P. also enforces the approval of all ammunition a manufacturer or importer intends to sell in any of the C.I.P. member states. The ammunition manufacturing plants are obliged to test their products during production against the C.I.P. pressure specifications. A compliance report must be issued for each production lot and archived for later verification if needed. The cartridge boxes must also be stamped with a C.I.P. approved number to allow quality/safety traceability according to ISO 9000 principles in case of quality problem though C.I.P. predates the creation of ISO 9000.

Since the very beginning, the C.I.P.’s concern has only been related to arms/ammunition safety from the user's point of view. Thus the C.I.P. is only interested in chamber pressures and not interested in the velocity achieved by the projectiles. As a result, the compulsory ammunition safety control tests by the manufacturers themselves and their approval by the proof houses are only pressure related. The dimensional checking of the ammunition, as described in the C.I.P. Decisions, Texts and Tables, is left to the manufacturers themselves. Headspace is not checked, even on rimless cartridges with taper. The view is that in the very unlikely case (according to the current quality standards) the cartridge is too long, once pressed by the bolt, the pressure will rise too high causing rejection. If it is too short, firing will fail also causing rejection.

The manufacturers do make velocity measurements, however. These measurements are made during production for quality control with respect to the user's performance expectations of the product for its purpose.

One exception is arising due to the market introduction of lead free shotshell ammunition loaded with steel or alloy (e.g., bismuth and tungsten) pellets instead of more traditional lead-based pellets. Due to environmental regulations, hunters in Europe are required to use lead loaded ammunition carefully. For instance, in France, they cannot fire in the vicinity of a pond. In fact, the laws are so complex that some hunters in Europe prefer not to risk getting into trouble for firing lead pellets in the wrong places, so they opt for steel or alloy pellets in all situations. This makes it necessary for manufacturers to market new types of lead free shotgun ammunition loaded with steel pellets. The Vickers hardness test VH1, of the pellet alloy must not exceed a certain level. Many variations in steel and alloy quality exist, but even so, harder metals, especially steel, are known to wear a barrel excessively over time if the shot column velocity and momentum (velocity multiplied by mass) are too great. This leads to potentially harmful situations for the user.

For the above reasons, the measurement of pellet velocity and momentum is also a C.I.P. imposed obligation for manufacture of shotshell gauges for 12, 16, and 20, in standard and high performance versions. The pellet's velocity must be below 425 m/s, 390 m/s, and 390 m/s, respectively, for the standard versions.

=== Handloaded ammunition ===
Although the same approval rules do not apply to hand loaders, given that their products cannot be legally sold in C.I.P. member states, in the interests of safety most Proof Houses afford those parties opportunity to batch test their ammunition to ensure that the associated chamber pressures, velocities and momentum are within acceptable standards. By so doing it reduces the potential for weapons being damaged, thereby injuring the user or innocent bystanders. Previous tests of this nature in the past have indicated the poor standards adopted by some of such parties and the lack of uniformity between rounds of ammunition.

=== NATO use of C.I.P. legislation ===
The NATO military alliance uses a NATO specific recognized class of procedures to control the safety and quality of firearms ammunition called NATO EPVAT testing. The civilian organisations C.I.P. and SAAMI use less comprehensive test procedures than NATO, but NATO test centres have the advantage that only a few NATO chamberings are in military use. The C.I.P. and SAAMI proof houses must be capable of testing hundreds of different chamberings requiring many different test barrels, etc. For all other small arms ammunition for use in "non-NATO Chamber" weapons, NATO has chosen to conform to the procedures as defined by the current C.I.P. legislation.

== C.I.P. Decisions, Texts and Tables ==
The C.I.P. Decisions are updated, modified and published every one or two years in the form of a Comprehensive Edition of Adopted C.I.P. Decisions, Texts and Tables in the form of CD-ROM containing Portable Document Format documents. Part of the Decisions, Texts and Tables are also available on-line on the C.I.P. website.

Official C.I.P. decisions regarding pressure are specified in the unit bar. Though the bar is not a SI unit like the pascal, nor a cgs unit, it is accepted for use with the SI by the US National Institute of Standards and Technology. The bar is widely used in descriptions of pressure because it is only 1.01325% smaller than "standard" atmospheric pressure, and is legally recognized in countries of the European Union. Conversion between the units bar and the MPa is however easy since 10 bar = 1 MPa.

If there are any contradictions between new decisions and preceding decisions adopted at Plenary Session meetings, the most recent decisions prevail. If there are any contradictions between English or German-language translations and the French original text, the latter prevails.

== Conflicting industry standards ==
The American equivalent of C.I.P. is the Sporting Arms and Ammunition Manufacturers' Institute (SAAMI) although operating differently. SAAMI is a manufacturer's association. In contrast to C.I.P.'s decisions the recommendations of SAAMI do not have the force of law.

These two main ammunition standards organisations are cooperating in an effort to unify their rules, though they are still hard at work resolving differences between their rules. The most critical issue is the technical method used the measure chamber pressures causing differences in measured chamber pressures.

To a lesser extent there are also some geometric dimensioning and tolerancing differences in some chamberings known as the Delta L problem. The possibility of chambering and/or feeding problems in a firearm caused by the Delta L problem can not be compared with SAAMI's Unsafe Arms and Ammunition Combinations which details situations where a smaller cartridge may fit in a firearm designed for a larger cartridge, but would be unsafe to use.

=== Ammunitions approval differences ===
The C.I.P. almost exclusively uses one type of piezoelectric sensor (called a "channel sensor") made by the Swiss company Kistler or the Austrian-made HPi GP6 that both require drilling of the cartridge case before firing the proofing cartridge in a specially made test barrel. SAAMI uses another type of piezoelectric sensor (called a "conformal transducer") that conforms to the contours of individual chambers and that therefore does not require prior drilling of the cartridge case. These are mostly made by the US company PCB Piezotronics. Conformal piezo transducers are more expensive to use because every different chamber wall shape requires a separate transducer whose piston matches that wall contour at the pressure sampling hole location. The channel sensor type is more economical to own because each sensor may be moved between all chambers that have the same size sample hole, of which there are only two.

For shotshell ammunition, the technical variations are easier to solve since only one type of piezoelectric sensor (called "tangential sensor") is available from the PCB Piezotronics and Kistler International companies to be used without drilling and which does not vary between SAAMI standards and C.I.P. rules.

=== Proof test differences ===
Under C.I.P. proof test standards a drilled case is used and the piezo measuring device (transducer) is positioned at a predefined distance from the breech face when the length of the cartridge case permits that, including limits. When the length of the cartridge case is too short or too long, pressure measurement will take place at a cartridge specific location defined at a shorter or longer distance from the breech face and depending on the dimensions of the case.

Under SAAMI proof test procedures, for bottlenecked cases the centre of the transducer is located 0.175 inches (4.4 mm) behind the shoulder of the case for large diameter (0.250 inches (6.4 mm)) transducers and 0.150 inches (3.8 mm) for small diameter (0.194 inches (4.9 mm)) transducers. For straight cases the centre of the transducer is located one-half of the transducer diameter plus 0.005 inches (0.13 mm) behind the base of the seated bullet. Small transducers are used when the case diameter at the point of measurement is less than 0.35 inches (8.9 mm).

The difference in the location of the pressure measurement gives different results than the SAAMI standard.

== Reference cartridges system ==
In order to solve the problems of conflicting industry standards, efforts are currently made to produce a notion regarding "reference cartridges" similar to the system used by NATO armies (NATO EPVAT testing). In this system every manufacturer has set aside a batch (also named "lot") of ammunition they consider to be of very good quality and representative of what they need to produce later. It is planned that these batches be sent to the C.I.P. proof houses and to SAAMI approved centers where "reference firings" should be performed.

The system is not in place due to two critical issues. One is the number of cartridges (more than 500) to be referenced which makes the operation excessively costly and lengthy. A second issue is the United States ITAR regulations which makes it very complex administratively to move ammunition back and forth from the United States to Europe, and vice versa.

== Proof houses ==
The testing and proofing of firearms and ammunition in the C.I.P. member states is performed at these C.I.P. accredited Proof Houses:

- Proof House Austria
  - Beschussamt Ferlach, Beschussamt Wien
- Proof House Belgium
  - Banc d’Epreuves de Liège
- Proof House Chile
  - Banco de Pruebas de Chile, Santiago
- Proof House Czech Republic
  - Czech Proof House for Arms and Ammunition (Český úřad pro zkoušení zbraní a střeliva), Prague
- Proof House Finland
  - The Proof House of Finland, Riihimäki
- Proof House France
  - Banc Officiel d’Epreuves de Saint-Étienne
- Proof Houses Germany
  - Beschussamt Hannover, Beschussamt Kiel, Beschussamt Köln, Beschussamt Mellrichstadt, Beschussamt München, Beschussamt Suhl, Beschussamt Ulm-Jungingen
- Proof House Hungary
  - PKLV, Polgári kézilőfegyver- és lőszervizsgáló Kft. (CSAAT, Civil Small Arms and Ammunition Testing Ltd.), Budapest
- Proof House Italy
  - Banco Nazionale di Prova per le Armi da Fuoco Portatili e per le Munizioni Commerciali, Gardone Val Trompia (BS)
- Proof Houses Russia
  - ProofHouse for the proof of small arms, Klimovsk (two proof houses), ProofHouse for civil and service arms, Izhevsk, ProofHouse "Test", Krasnozavodsk
- Proof House Serbia
  - Proof House Kragujevac
- Proof House Slovakia
  - Konštrukta Defence, a.s., Lieskovec
- Proof House Spain
  - Banco Oficial de Pruebas de Armas de Fuego de Eibar
- Proof House United Arab Emirates
  - Emirates Proof House, Villa #9, AL Muroor Rd, P.O. Box 94499, Abu Dhabi
- Proof Houses United Kingdom
  - The London Proof House, The Birmingham Proof House

== Synopsis of C.I.P. homologation TDCC data ==
- C.I.P. HOMOLOGATION List of TDCC – Tab I – Rimless cartridges
- C.I.P. HOMOLOGATION List of TDCC – Tab II – Rimmed cartridges
- C.I.P. HOMOLOGATION List of TDCC – Tab III – Magnum cartridges
- C.I.P. HOMOLOGATION List of TDCC – Tab IV – Pistol and revolver cartridges
- C.I.P. HOMOLOGATION List of TDCC – Tab V – Rimfire cartridges – Crusher
- C.I.P. HOMOLOGATION List of TDCC – Tab V – Rimfire cartridges – Transducer
- C.I.P. HOMOLOGATION List of TDCC – Tab VI – Cartridges for industrial use
- C.I.P. HOMOLOGATION List of TDCC – Tab VII – Shot cartridges
- C.I.P. HOMOLOGATION List of TDCC – Tab VIII – Cartridges for alarm weapons
- C.I.P. HOMOLOGATION List of TDCC – Tab IX – Dust shot cartridges
- C.I.P. HOMOLOGATION List of TDCC – Tab X – Cartridges for other weapons

== See also ==
- Ammunition
- Small arms ammunition pressure testing
- Overpressure ammunition
- SAAMI, an American standardization organization for firearm cartridges
- NATO EPVAT testing
- DEVA, a German firearms test institute
- Wildcat cartridge
