= Howa 1500 =

Howa M1500
- Type: Bolt-action rifle
- Place of origin: Japan

Production history
- Manufacturer: Howa Machinery, Ltd.
- Produced: 1979–present

Specifications
- Mass: 3400g (DX); 4200g (heavy barrel)
- Length: 1080mm (DX); 1118mm (heavy barrel)
- Cartridge: Mini action (Note: From 2015 onwards. Short-action and Long-action have been available since rifle was introduced in 1979.): .223 Remington, 7.62x39, 6.5 mm Grendel; Short action: .22-250, .223 Remington, .204 Ruger, .308 Winchester, 6.5 Creedmoor. Long action: .270 Winchester, 6.5×55mm .30-06, .300 Winchester Magnum, .338 Winchester Magnum, 7mm Remington Magnum, .375 Ruger
- Action: Bolt-action, Mauser type
- Muzzle velocity: Depends on caliber
- Effective firing range: Depends on caliber
- Maximum firing range: Depends on caliber
- Feed system: 3-5 (internal magazine, varies on caliber), 5 or 10 (detachable box magazine)

The Howa 1500 or Howa M1500 (豊和M1500, hōwa-M1500) is a bolt-action rifle produced in Japan by Howa Machinery. Introduced in 1979, it has been used by hunters as a hunting rifle with various cartridge offerings. It is also utilized by military and law enforcement elements as a sniper rifle. It is sold under the name of Howa Model 1500 Rifle for overseas markets.

== Overview ==
The M1500 followed the Howa Golden Bear hunting rifle that Howa Industries manufactured previously. Howa used the Weatherby Mark V - which was manufactured by Howa Industries on an OEM basis - as the reference. However, whereas Mark V's bolt opening / closing angle is 54 degrees narrow, the M1500 uses the more general 90 degree opening / closing angle.

The M1500 is one of three large-caliber bolt-action rifles produced in Japan, and is sold as Howa's representative rifle not only in Japan, but throughout the world. The others are the Browning AB3 and X-Bolt platforms, produced by Miroku, located in Kochi, Japan.

The rifle has a Mauser type one-piece structure, cock-on opening. The trigger is a two-stage trigger that enhances accuracy. In 2011, a new two-stage trigger system called HACT (Howa Actuator Controlled Trigger) was introduced.

The safety device is relatively rudimentary and locks the trigger with a US patented three-position system that has a safety position where only the trigger is locked and a safety position where the bolt is locked at the same time as the trigger.

The internal magazine can hold 3–5 rounds, loaded through the open action, similar to the Type 38 infantry rifle. For models sold overseas, an optional removable box magazine is available for the M1500 as well. These magazines come with 5- and 10-round capacity.

Barrels are chromoly, not chrome-lined as seen the Type 64 rifle. They are offered in both sporting length, weight and profile as well as Varmint length and weight. All guns circulating within Japan undergo fire-testing at the Toyokazu Company, and every new rifle has its paper test target enclosed with the firearm.

There are two models available on the Japanese market. The Deluxe model fitted with open sights and the sightless varmint-hunting model, known as the Heavy Barrel. Both versions are available either blued or in stainless steel, for a total of four models on sale, independent of caliber. Short action and long action (Note: Short-action is used for .30-06 or smaller cartridge, while long-action is used for .300 Winchester Magnum or larger cartridge.) calibers are available including, but not limited to .22-250 Remington, .223 Remington, .204 Ruger, 6.5×55mm Swedish, .300 Winchester Magnum, .308 Winchester, .30-06 Springfield, .338 Winchester Magnum, and .375 Ruger, so the user can freely choose to suit their purpose. In 2015, Howa introduced the "mini action" for .223 Remington, 7.62x39, and 6.5 mm Grendel. Since introduction of mini-action, in certain markets, short action is now called "standard action".

For foreign exports, the barreled action with trigger mechanism are also supplied in a stripped-down form to various small arms manufacturers. It is common that a maker will choose and attach its own stock to Howa's barreled actions, and then sell it under their own brand. Weatherby Vanguard is such an example. Previously, Smith & Wesson, O.F. Mossberg & Sons and Inter-Arms sold them as the M1500. Currently in the United States, Legacy Sports International, a firearms manufacturer and distributor in Reno, Nevada, markets and sells bolt-action rifles that use the Howa M1500 barreled action. Their latest rifle to use the Howa M1500 barreled action is the HCR (Howa Chassis Rifle) which accepts some AR-15 components

For overseas specifications, the M1500 standard 24-inch (about 60 cm) barrel was shortened to 22 inches (about 56 cm) in 1982, and the M1700LS was made lighter by omitting iron sights, similarly to the Heavy Barrel model, based on the likelihood that the rifle would be used with a scope. In 1985, at the request of Mossberg, the M1550, which was based on the M1500 and had a 5-round magazine from the beginning, was additionally sold, but both are now discontinued.

In addition, among the models sold overseas, if a defect in the rifle's bolt is detected, Howa will provide a new bolt, free of charge, for the target serial number.

The M1500, while being comparatively low priced compared to other overseas models, has been judged to have all the delicacy and robustness one would expect from Japanese engineering. In a live-fire test by overseas enthusiasts, a video showing that succeeful sniping of an empty can from 800 yards (730 meters) away was released.

Spare parts have also sold fairly well, however starting with the incursion of Remington into the Japanese domestic market, foreign companies with stronger brand recognition and more competitive prices have caused M1500 sales to become sluggish. For this reason, more than 95% of Howa M1500s are produced in stripped down form for overseas export.

In March 2020, the Howa 1500 was the third best-selling bolt-action rifle on GunBroker.

== Variants ==
- Three action lengths:
  - Howa 1500 Mini action: .223 Remington, .22 ARC, 7.62x39 mm, 6.5 mm Grendel, .300 AAC, .350 Legend, and 6 mm ARC.
  - Howa 1500 Short action: .22-250 Remington, .223 Remington, .204 Ruger, 6.5 Creedmoor, 6.5×55 mm Swedish, and .308 Winchester.
  - Howa 1500 Long action: .30-06 Springfield, .300 Winchester Magnum, .338 Winchester Magnum, 7 mm Remington Magnum, and .375 Ruger
- Hogue - with 22 or 24 in (560 or 610 mm) barrel options
- Alpine Mountain - 20 in (510 mm) lightweight barrel
- Scout - Scout rifle with 18.5 in (470 mm) threaded barrel, available in .308 Winchester only.
- HCR (Howa Chassis Rifle) - accepts AR-15-style furniture for customization.
- HS Precision - 22 and 24 in (560 and 610 mm) Standard Barrel or 26 in (660 mm) Semi Heavy Barrel

== Adoption ==
=== Japanese law enforcement ===
The M1500 was originally sold as a hunting rifle, but prefectural police departments in Japan have adopted it as a sniper rifle. (Note: As an example similar to the 1500, overseas, the Remington Model 700 is used for hunting as well as for sniping by the military and police.) This particular model was designated the Heavy Barrel. Heavy barreled "Varmint" or colloquially, "Sniper" rifles are fitted with longer, heavier barrels to increase projectile velocity, resist heat soak, and provide more accurate follow-up shots.

In addition, the Japanese police stipulate that equipment other than pistols are to referred to as special guns, and the M1500 is designated as the Special Gun Type-I (特殊銃I型, Tokushujū I-gata). The police-issued M1500 features a wooden stock, alongside a bipod and a scope.

In addition to regular police snipers, the M1500 is also adopted by the Special Assault Team, Special Security Team, Anti-Firearms Squads, and the Fukui Prefectural Police's Nuclear Special Guard Unit.

It is also utilized by the Japan Coast Guard. However, on the ocean, it is said that the Howa Type 64 designated marksman rifles capable of firing faster than the M1500 are used more frequently.

== See also ==
- Howa Machinery, Ltd.
- SIG Sauer 200 STR
- Tikka T3
