= Weatherby Mark V =

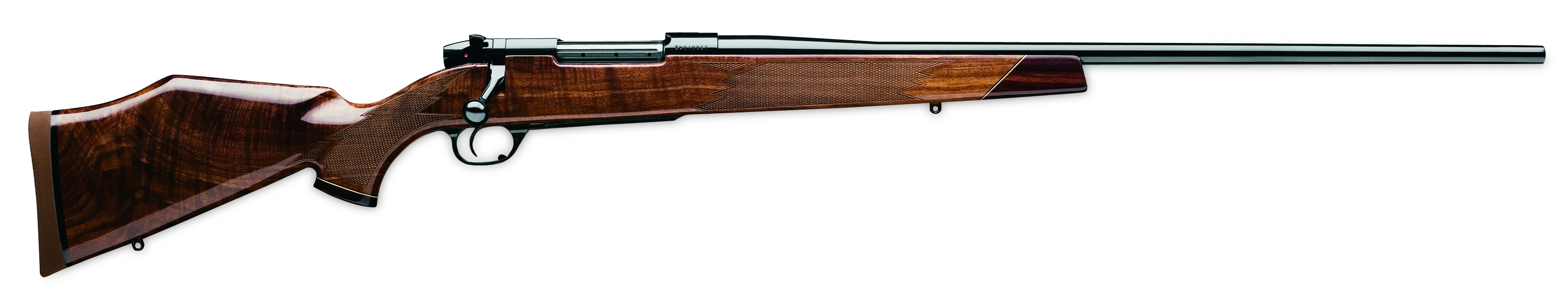
- Type: bolt-action rifle
- Place of origin: United States

Service history
- Used by: Argentina
- Wars: Falklands War

Production history
- Designer: Roy Weatherby, Fred Jennie
- Designed: 1955
- Manufacturer: J.P. Sauer & Sohn; Howa Machinery, Ltd. Weatherby, Inc
- Produced: 1957
- Variants: Weatherby Magnum, Non-Magnum, and Varmintmaster^{*} Mark V action variants. Models produced include Accumark, Accumark Pistol^{*}, Alaskan^{*}, Center Fire Pistol^{*}, Classicmark^{*}, Compact Firing Platform (CFP)^{*} Crown Custom^{*}, Dangerous Game Rifle (DGR)^{*}, Dangerous Game Rifle Custom, Deluxe, Euromark^{*}, Euromark Custom, Europa^{*}, Eurosport^{*}, Fibermark, Lazermark, Outfitter Custom, Royal Ultramark Custom, Safari Custom, Safari Grade^{*}, Silhouette Pistol^{*}, Special Varmint Rifle^{*}, Sporter, Stainless^{*}, Stainless Fluted^{*}, Stainless Laminate Sporter^{*}, Super Big Gamemaster^{*}, Super Predator Master^{*}, Super Varmintmaster^{*}, Synthetic, Threat Response Rifle (TRR), Threat Response Rifle Custom, Threat Response Rifle Sub MOA, Ultra Lightweight, Ultramark, Varmintmaster^{*} and Weathermark^{*} (* Discontinued)

Specifications
- Cartridge: .224 Weatherby Magnum^{*}; .240 Weatherby Magnum; .257 Weatherby Magnum; 6.5 Weatherby RPM; .270 Weatherby Magnum; 7 mm Weatherby Magnum; .300 Weatherby Magnum; .30-378 Weatherby Magnum; .340 Weatherby Magnum; .338-378 Weatherby Magnum; .375 Weatherby Magnum; .378 Weatherby Magnum; .416 Weatherby Magnum; .460 Weatherby Magnum; .22-250 Remington^{*}; .243 Winchester; .25-06 Remington; .270 Winchester; 7mm-08 Remington; 7 mm Remington Magnum; .308 Winchester; .30-06 Springfield; .300 Winchester Magnum; .338-06; .338 Weatherby RPM; .338 Winchester Magnum^{*}; .375 H&H Magnum; .416 Remington Magnum; .458 Winchester Magnum; .458 Lott; .460 Weatherby Magnum
- Action: Cock-upon-open bolt-action rifle
- Feed system: 2- to 5-round internal box magazine (depending on caliber)
- Sights: Drilled and tapped for scope mounts. Iron sights included on some models.

The Weatherby Mark V is a centerfire, bolt-action rifle manufactured by Weatherby of Sheridan, Wyoming. The rifle was introduced in 1957 by Weatherby and was designed to safely contain the high pressures associated with the Weatherby line of high performance cartridges. It is the flagship rifle of the Weatherby line of firearms.

The Weatherby Mark V rifles are considered prestigious or luxury firearms by many. This is due in part to Roy Weatherby who presented the rifles to royalty, politicians, gun writers and actors including Prince Abdorreza Pahlavi of Iran, Generals James Doolittle (USAF) and Chuck Yeager (USAF), Jack O'Connor, Warren Page, Elgin Gates and Lorne Greene and was able to use this fact as a marketing tool.

== Early development ==
Ever since Roy Weatherby began manufacturing rifles he had to rely on a third party to provide the actions for his rifles. Beginning in 1949 Weatherby began building his rifles around the FN Belgian Mauser action. In 1955 Schultz & Larsen actions were added to the mix while adding the Mathieu left handed action to his rifle action line up. With the addition of the large capacity .378 Weatherby Magnum a new action type was warranted so the Brevex Magnum Mauser action was added. A little later the FN Sako Mauser actions were added to action types used by Weatherby to build his rifles.

Roy Weatherby had been disappointed by the length of time that was taken discussing and negotiating before coming to an agreement with his European manufacturing partners. With five European companies supplying actions, the frequent trips made to Europe left him little time to run the day-to-day business operations in South Gate, California.

Roy Weatherby had found the Mauser-type wanting due to the case head not being completely enclosed and supported within the breech. While these action types could easily withstand a high pressure of about 70,000 C.U.P., he felt that one which would have the capability of handling 200,000 C.U.P. would fare better with the Weatherby line of cartridges. He had been aware that many handloaders were overloading their cartridges seeking higher performance, which was resulting in blown primers and ruptured case heads. This in turn would lead to hot gases making their way through the bolt and into the shooter's face and eyes and causing injuries to his customers.

Weatherby's requirements included a bolt face which was countersunk into the bolt which would enclose the cartridge's case head while the bolt head was enclosed in a counterbored barrel breach, which in turn would prevent the case head from rupturing. If a rupture should occur, the bolt would have holes through which hot gases could be vented safely towards the side and away from the shooter's face. Further as an extra safety measure he required an enclosed or shrouded bolt sleeve that would prevent the hot gases from making their way through the bolt mechanism to the shooter's face. To Weatherby, the safety and strength of the design were paramount.

The Weatherby Mark V action uses an interrupted screw breech as used on many artillery pieces. The nine lugs are actually sections of a screw thread. The bolt cams forward slightly as the bolt is closed following the pitch angle of the screw thread. Weatherby designed the action type with nine locking lugs arranged in three rows. It was determined early on that these lugs would not protrude outside the bolt but would be of the same diameter as the bolt body itself. Such a design would be conducive to a smooth fluid movement of the bolt through its feeding and extraction cycles.

In spring 1955 Weatherby demonstrated his new action at the annual NRA meetings in Washington, D.C. The action type was shown to Burt Munhall of H.P. White Ballistics Laboratory and to General Julian Hatcher to elicit their opinion of the design. Both were impressed with the design and encouraged Weatherby to commercialize the action as soon as possible. At this time Weatherby had been looking for someone to provide the technical design, drawings and specifications for the design of his new action. General Hatcher suggested that John Garand (of the M1 Garand rifle fame) would be suitable for the job. However, when contacted Garand expressed disinterest in the project as he was enjoying his retirement.

Walter Howe, the editor of the American Rifleman magazine suggested the Mathewson Tool Company of New Haven which had worked with Winchester, Remington, and the U.S. government designing and building prototypes. While Dave Mathewson managed to build and deliver the design details, the prototype did not include all the features which Weatherby had required, while taking longer than anticipated to provide the prototype design.

It was not until 1957 that the first prototype rifle was built. This was the fifth design model of the rifle as four previous designs had been abandoned. The rifle was shown to Elgin Gates who suggested that the rifle be named the Mark V. This fifth prototype was designed and built with the assistance of Fred Jennie, an engineer hired by Roy Weatherby. It was more streamlined and had a more simplified trigger and safety which would lead to lower manufacturing and tooling costs.

In 1956 Weatherby visited Europe in an attempt to find a supplier for the Mark V action. Steyr-Daimler-Puch, which had been manufacturing the Mannlicher rifle, was eager to work with Weatherby, but the high cost of the initial tooling charges of $200,000 was found to have been too excessive. Schultz & Larsen, which had been building the .378 Weatherby Magnum, was also contacted, but due to an anticipated rise in labor costs Weatherby had to keep looking elsewhere. When Sako of Finland, which was working on the FN Mauser action for Weatherby rifles was approached, it indicated that it had a backlog of production yet to complete and that such a project would have to wait for a year and a half. Also, labor costs in Finland had been rising, which would increase the price per unit cutting into profits. The Birmingham Small Arms Company Limited (BSA) of Birmingham was extremely receptive to the idea of building the action and even attempted to absorb the initial tooling costs. However, it was unable to manufacture the action with the nine locking lugs.

While several companies bid on the contract, Weatherby settled on Precision Foundry Inc. (PFI) of San Leandro, California in 1957. It was decided that all major parts would use the investment casting process. Another firm, Gardner Machine Co. of Hollywood, California, would finish all these parts to their final dimensions and Picco Industries of Sierra Madre, California would manufacture the magazine floorplate catch, the trigger sear, and the thumb safety. All the parts thus manufactured would be delivered to Weatherby's South Gate facility where the final polishing, bluing, and assembly would take place. The barrel and stocks were made in-house by Weatherby at the company's South Gate facility.

Due to the investment casting process and issues with porosity of metal, PFI manufactured actions did not easily accept the high-luster bluing process which was a trademark of Weatherby rifles, which resulted in high rejection rates of over 50%. Furthermore, the delivery of component parts by PFI had been irregular, which led to a backlog of orders.

In 1957 Weatherby went back to Europe to visit J.P. Sauer & Sohn, which was at the time primarily a shotgun manufacturer. Udo van Meeteren wanted not only to manufacture the action but also the complete rifle as well. Within two months of the visit a contract with J.P. Sauer & Sohn was signed. In 1958 Fred Jennie visited the Sauer plant in Eckernförde, Germany to help with the setup process. At this time it was decided that receiver and bolt would be made from forgings instead of the investment casting process as Sauer was more familiar with the process. Rifle barrels would be hammer-forged by Sauer, which promoted greater uniformity from breech to muzzle and which in turn led to greater accuracy and longer barrel life. By employing this method of hammer-forging barrels, Weatherby became the first U.S. company to offer hammer-forged barrels in the United States.

In 1970 Weatherby moved production to the Howa factory in Japan. The move was a result of increased costs of production in Europe; Howa was able to make the rifles and at a greater cost savings. The strength of the actions was never compromised—to many, fit and finish are superior to German models and compete well with U.S. models. Howa manufactured Mark Vs until production was brought to the United States in 1994.

== Proof testing of the Mark V action ==
Weatherby had intended that the new action would be the safest and strongest bolt action available. The rifle was marketed as "The World's Strongest Bolt Action". The Mark V action has been tested to be able to contain up to 200,000 CUP (Copper Units of Pressure).

The testing of the rifle was conducted on a production rifle chambered for the .300 Weatherby Magnum. Before testing was to be conducted, very thorough measurements of the rifle were taken so as to provide a benchmark for the testing which was to be undertaken.

The first test was conducted using a 180 gr (12 g) bullet propelled by 82 gr (5.3 g) of Du Pont #4350 powder. This load provided 65,000 psi (4,500 bar) of pressure. This load did not show any pressure or extraction issues with the new Mark V action but caused a slight sticking of the cartridge case in the Mauser style rifle design. Subsequent testing was performed using the same 180 gr (12 g) bullet and using a powder charge of Du Pont #4350 which increased by increments of 2 gr (0.13 g) for each test thereafter.

The second testing which was conducted with the 84 gr (5.4 g) showed no signs of pressure nor issues with extraction even though the measured pressure was close to 75,000 psi (5,200 bar). Firing this load in the Mauser rifle led to a blown primer and extreme difficulty was experienced in extracting the spent case.

Using 86 gr (5.6 g) of Du Pont #4350 the cartridge began to show signs of pressure in the Mark V action. However, the case did not stick and extraction was performed easily. Breech pressure was found to be between 85,000–95,000 psi (5,900–6,600 bar). Measurements of the spent case showed that the case had stretched at the belt a mere .0005 in (0.013 mm).

The spent case from the 88 gr (5.7 g) test led to a slightly sticking case, which in turn led to a slight difficulty in opening of the bolt. Measurements from the case belt showed that the belt had expanded from .533 in (13.5 mm) to .535 in (13.6 mm). The pressure generated by this load was 100,000 psi (6,900 bar).

The fifth test was conducted used a load of 90 gr (5.8 g) of Du Pont 4350. Firing this load led to some difficulty in opening the bolt, and the case was extracted when opened. The belt of the case still measured .535 in (13.6 mm). A difference in the diameter between the bolt head and the diameter of the barrel of .002 in (0.051 mm) per side was noted. No bulging of the bolt, receiver or the barrel was noted. Headspace was measured to be the same as prior to the testing.

Further testing was conducted with a 180 gr (12 g) bullet lodged into the throat of the barrel. A cartridge loaded with the standard charge of 78 gr (5.1 g) of Du Pont 4350 and a 180 gr (12 g) bullet was fired into the back of the first bullet. It was found that both bullets exited the barrel. The primer had been pierced and the exiting gas entered into the bolt and hit the firing pin sleeve, which was loosened slightly. The bolt was opened by hand but the cartridge stayed stuck in the chamber. When the case was tapped out, it was found to be in good condition except for its pierced primer. It was found that the barrel, just in front of the receiver ring, had expanded from 1.147 in (29.1 mm) to 1.1496 in (29.20 mm). The diameter of the bolt head had expanded from .7178 in (18.23 mm) to .7190 in (18.26 mm). The head space had increased from .2163 in (5.49 mm) to .2174 in (5.52 mm). All other dimensions had stayed constant. This test was conducted 15 times. A test was conducted with a 220 gr (14 g) bullet lodged into the bore of the rifle and a 180 gr (12 g) grain bullet was fired into the back of this bullet. The result of this test found that the cartridge case head had expanded to .545 in (13.8 mm). After these additional 15 tests it was found that the head space was set back only a mere .001 in (0.025 mm).

=== Action variants ===
The Weatherby Mark V action has remained virtually unchanged from the original design of Fred Jennie and Roy Weatherby which is a testament to the longevity of the design. Nevertheless, some refinement to the design has occurred over time. The Mark V action is a front locking, push feed, bolt action repeater. The lug arrangement allows for 54° bolt lift. This shorter bolt lift allows for increased clearance between the bolt handle and any accessories such as scopes that may be mounted on the rifle and arguably provides for faster cycling of the action. This compares favorably with the Mauser style rifles which have a 90° bolt lift.

The bolt body, including the handle is made of a single piece of machined steel. To remove any play and reduce any chance of the bolt binding during the cycling of the action, the bolt head is smaller with the locking lugs being the same diameter as the body itself. The bolt has three gas vents along the bolt body which will allow for the venting of hot gases should the case not seal the chamber or if a pierced primer should occur. Shortly after production began in Germany, the bolt body was fluted to provide further positive feeding and extraction of the cartridges.

=== 9 Lug/Magnum ===
The 9 Lug/Magnum action was the original design which went into production and was also the design which was subject to the strength testing conducted by Weatherby. The original 9 Lug design lacked the bolt fluting and featured a safety mounted on the receiver. These rifles were made by PFI and J.P. Sauer & Sohn in the early 1960s. The refinements to the original design included a fluted bolt and a redesigned safety allowing for smoother feeding and extraction and a safer design. The 9 Lug action is considered the archetypal Mark V action. The 9 Lug design features a bolt head with nine locking lugs arranged in three rows with each row having three locking lugs. The Magnum Mark V bolt is the heaviest bolt available in a commercially produced rifle.

The 9 Lug Mark V action is currently available in rifles chambered for Weatherby calibers. However, late production Sauer and very early Howa manufactured Mark V rifles in .30-06 Springfield and .270 Winchester were chambered in the 9 Lug Mark V actions. As the production run of these rifles was short such rifles are a rarity and considered collectibles.

=== Varmintmaster ===
In 1963 Weatherby introduced a scaled down version of the 9 Lug design which was made specifically for chambering smaller varmint cartridges. The Varmintmaster was introduced together with the .224 Weatherby Magnum cartridge. The Varmintmaster was also chambered in the .22-250 Remington.

This action featured six lugs arranged in two rows. The 9 Lug design was found to be too large and too long for use with varmint cartridges and this new action addressed this issue. The action features a shorter one piece bolt of a smaller diameter than the 6 Lug/Standard design. The Varmintmaster action was later used in the Weatherby Mark V Silhouette handgun as well.

=== 6 Lug/Standard ===
Before Weatherby launched its Rebated Precision Magnum (RPM) cartridge family in 2019 with the 6.5 Weatherby RPM, the 6 Lug design was only available in non-Weatherby cartridges and was offered beginning with the .30-06 Springfield and the .270 Winchester cartridges. Like the Varmintmaster (which predates the 6 Lug/Standard action design) it features six locking lugs arranged in two rows. The bolt is shorter and is considerably lighter than the 9 Lug/Magnum design. Coupled with a narrower receiver, the Standard Mark V action is better suited to most cartridges.

This action type is also used by the Weatherby CFP (Center-fire Pistol) as it provided a greater flexibility as to which cartridges could be chambered. The Standard Mark V action was also used in the Super Varmintmaster rifle rather than the original Varmintmaster action due to cost and production constraints. The only Weatherby cartridges that are compatible with the Standard Mark V action are those of the RPM family (currently the 6.5 RPM and .338 RPM, the latter introduced in 2022).
