= Mk 47 =

Mk 47 may refer to:

- Mk 47 Striker, United States automatic grenade launcher
- CMMG Mk47 Mutant, United states semi-automatic rifle
