= Remington Model 799 =

- Type: Rifle
- Place of origin: Serbia

Production history
- Manufacturer: Zastava Arms
- Produced: 2006–2008

Specifications
- Mass: 7.75 lb (3.52 kg)
- Length: 39.5–42.5 in (100–108 cm)
- Barrel length: 20–26 in (51–66 cm)
- Cartridge: .22 Hornet; .222 Remington; .223 Remington; .22-250 Remington; 7.62×39

The Remington Model 799 is a bolt-action repeating hunting rifle made by Serbian Zastava and branded under Remington Arms. The action is based on a modified Mauser 98 action. Before it was marketed by Remington Arms, the gun was imported into the United States by Charles Daly of Charles Daly firearms. The Charles Daly version was less expensive, and was also offered as barreled actions.
