= Howa Golden Bear =

- Type: Bolt-action rifle, Hunting rifle
- Place of origin: Japan

Production history
- Manufacturer: Howa Machinery, Ltd.
- Produced: 1967-1979
- Variants: Deluxe, Presentation, Medallion

Specifications
- Mass: 3,300g (.30-06), 3,200g (.308Win)
- Length: 1,160mm (.30-06), 1,075mm (.308Win)
- Barrel length: 616mm (.30-06), 565mm (.308Win)
- Cartridge: .30-06, .308 Winchester, others
- Caliber: 7.62mm
- Action: Bolt-action, Mauser type
- Muzzle velocity: Depends on caliber
- Effective firing range: Depends on caliber
- Maximum firing range: Depends on caliber
- Feed system: 5-rounds

Howa Golden Bear is a bolt-action rifle that was manufactured by Howa Industries in the past.

== History ==
Howa Industries established its firearms manufacturing plant in 1960 after World War II. In the same year, Howa released the M300 (Note: Based on the M1 Carbine) as a hunting gun for domestic markets. Soon after releasing the Howa M300, the company began working on a new type of a hunting rifle in order to meet the demand for large-caliber bolt-action rifles in Japan. During the development, the designers used the Finnish SAKO L61R "Finnbear" as the basis of the design.

In 1967, Howa introduced the Howa Golden Bear large-caliber rifle at the US Open rifle exhibition in Chicago, USA. At the time, it was the only large caliber hunting rifle available domestically in Japan. (Note: Excluding Murata rifles that were manufactured or sold as rifles before World War II.) Approximately 3000 golden bear rifles were sold to the United States and passed every test at the renowned HP White Laboratory, one of the world's most renowned firearms testing facilities. Following the launch of the weapon, Howa gained popularity and acceptability in the American market.

The Golden Bear was launched in Japan and the United States in 1967, and the export specification grades were three types: deluxe, presentation, and medallion. In Japan, only the deluxe model was sold.

In the United States, the Howa rifles were sold by Dickson Roses company as "Dickson-Howa Golden Bear". Also in the US Market, Weatherby, which had business connections with Howa, also sold Howa rifles (OEM) under the name of Weatherby Vanguard. (Note: Later, Howa M1500 was also OEM-supplied to Weatherby, Inc. under the same name.)

In 1979, an updated design/model of the Howa Golden Bear, the M1500 were introduced, with the older Golden Bear model becoming discontinued in same year.

== Design ==
Howa Golden Bear is very similar to its parent weapon, the Sako L61R "Finnbear".

== Use by Japanese law enforcement ==
Despite being designed for hunting, the Golden Bear was adopted by elements within Japanese law-enforcement.

Based on the lessons learned from the Kin Kiro incident in 1968, the National Police Agency deployed a Golden Bear rifles to the prefectural police as equipment for taking down criminals and rescuing hostages. Additionally, all police Golden Bear rifles came with a scope.

When the Setouchi Seajacking incident occurred in 1970, the Osaka Prefectural Police Special Gun Corps (currently the Anti-Firearms Squadron) sniper took down the criminal with a Golden Bear rifle, allowing other officers to rescue the hostages.

The Golden Bear is also said to have used the Tokyo Metropolitan Police Department's Special Squadron (now the SAT).

According to Megumi Tsukiji of Far East Gun Sales, the Golden Bear used by the Japanese police was chambered in .30-06 Springfield and equipped with an Bushnell Corporation 3-9 scope with magnification.
