= 7.62×39mm =

Soviet military intermediate rifle cartridge

7.62×39 mm
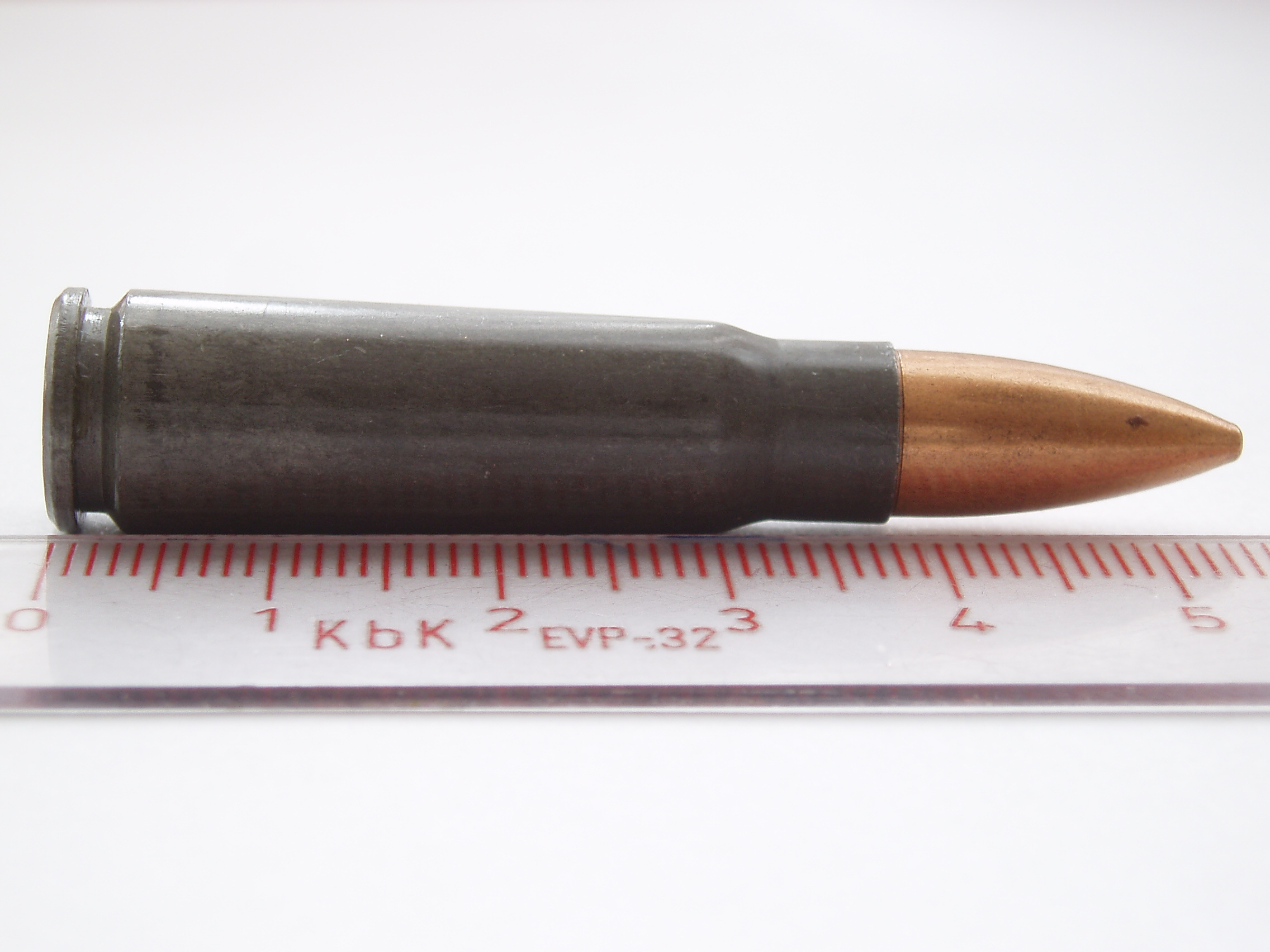
- A steel-cased 7.62×39 mm FMJ cartridge
- Type: Rifle
- Place of origin: Soviet Union

Service history
- In service: 1945–present
- Used by: former Soviet Union, former Warsaw Pact, Iraq, Iran, Russia, China, India, Ethiopia, Egypt, Cambodia, North Korea, Vietnam, Cuba, Finland, Venezuela, many others

Production history
- Designed: 1943
- Produced: 1944–present

Specifications
- Case type: Rimless, bottleneck
- Bullet diameter: 7.85–7.9 mm (0.309–0.311 in) SAAMI; 7.92 mm (0.312 in) CIP
- Land diameter: 7.62 mm (0.300 in)
- Neck diameter: 8.60 mm (0.339 in)
- Shoulder diameter: 10.07 mm (0.396 in)
- Base diameter: 11.35 mm (0.447 in)
- Rim diameter: 11.35 mm (0.447 in)
- Rim thickness: 1.50 mm (0.059 in)
- Case length: 38.70 mm (1.524 in)
- Overall length: 56.00 mm (2.205 in)
- Case capacity: 2.31 cm^{3} (35.6 gr H_{2}O)
- Rifling twist: 240 mm (1 in 9.45 in)
- Primer type: Boxer large rifle (brass); Berdan (steel case)
- Maximum pressure (C.I.P.): 355.0 MPa (51,490 psi)
- Maximum pressure (SAAMI): 310.3 MPa (45,010 psi)
- Filling: SSNF 50 powder
- Filling weight: 1.605–1.63 g

Ballistic performance
| Bullet mass/type | Velocity | Energy |
|---|---|---|
| 7.9 g (122 gr) 57N231 FMJ | 730.3 m/s (2,396 ft/s) | 2,108 J (1,555 ft⋅lbf) |
| 10.0 g (154 gr) SP | 641.3 m/s (2,104 ft/s) | 2,056 J (1,516 ft⋅lbf) |
| 8.0 g (123 gr) FMJ | 738.0 m/s (2,421 ft/s) | 2,179 J (1,607 ft⋅lbf) |
- Test barrel length: 520 mm (20 in) (in Sellier & Bellot tests); Sources: Wolf Ammo Sellier & Bellot

The 7.62×39 mm (also called 7.62 Soviet, formerly .30 Russian Short) round is a rimless bottlenecked intermediate cartridge of Soviet origin. The cartridge is widely used due to the global proliferation of the AK-47 rifle and related Kalashnikov-pattern rifles, the SKS semi-automatic rifle, and the RPD/RPK light machine guns.

The AK-47 was designed shortly after World War II, later becoming the AKM because the production of sheet metal receivers had issues when first initiated. This weapon is now the world's most widespread military-pattern rifle. The cartridge remained the Soviet standard until the 1970s. It was partly replaced in Soviet service by the 5.45×39mm cartridge, which was introduced with the new AK-74 rifle, and continues in service with the modernized current-issue Russian Armed Forces AK-74M service rifle, as well as the AK-12 rifle. In the 21st century, the 7.62×39 mm remains a common service rifle chambering, including for newly developed rifles like the AK-15.

== History ==
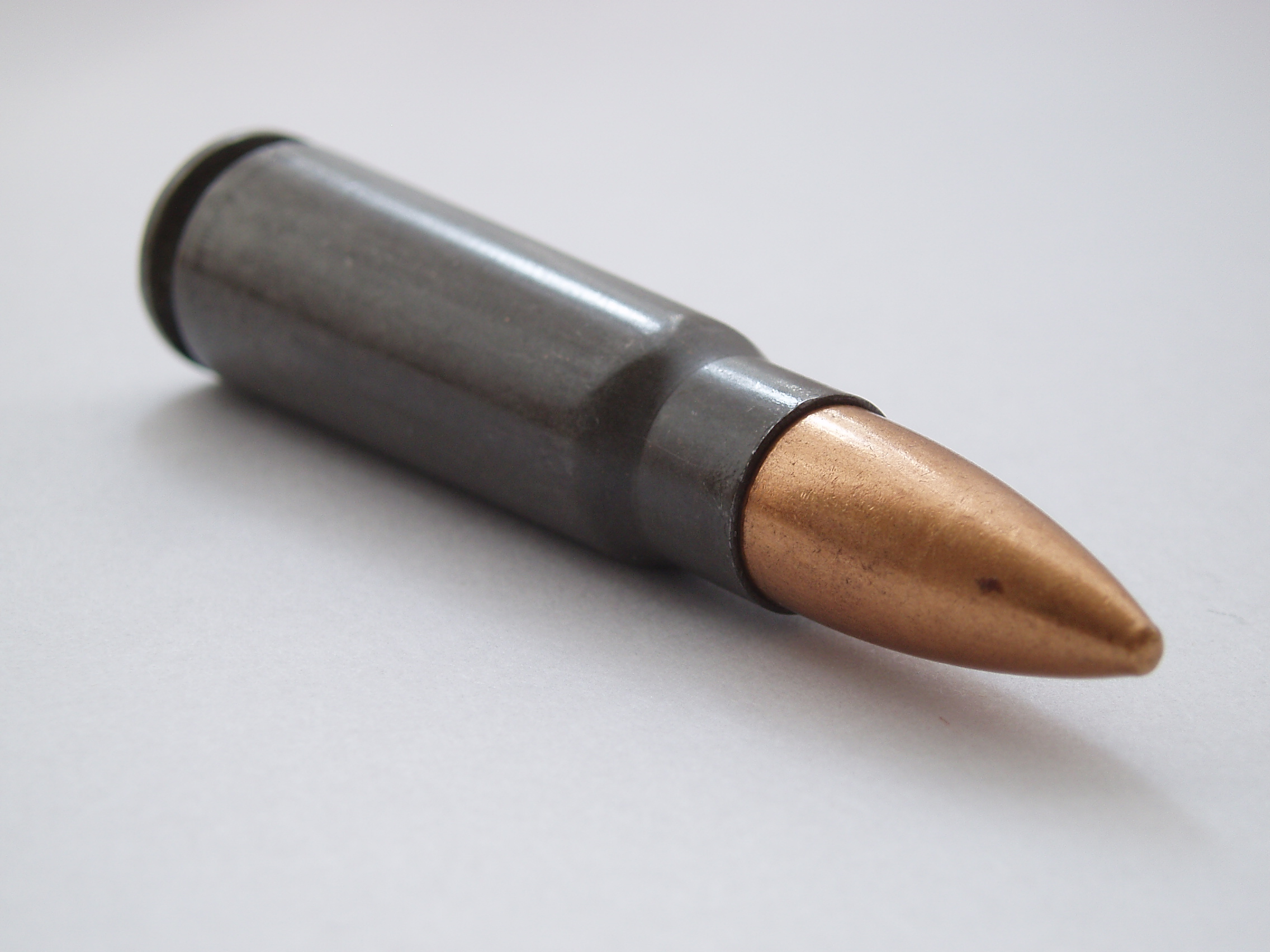
Steel-cased 7.62×39mm FMJ cartridge

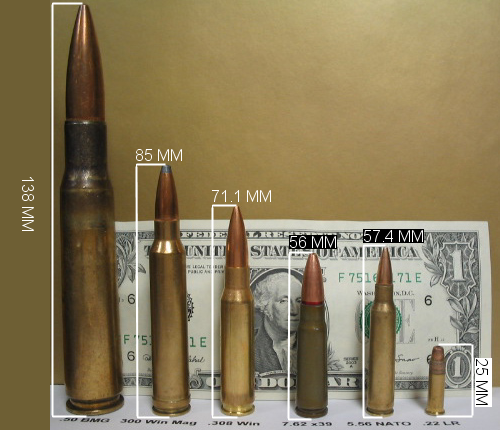
7.62×39mm (fourth from left), shown alongside other cartridges

On July 15, 1943, the Technical Council of the People's Commissariat for Armaments (Russian: Техсовет Наркомата Вооружения) met to discuss the introduction of a Soviet intermediate cartridge. The Soviet planners also decided at this meeting that their new cartridge was to be used in a whole range of infantry weapons, including a semi-automatic carbine, a selective fire submachine gun (in modern terms, a select-fire weapon firing an intermediate cartridge is considered an assault rifle), and a light machine gun. The job of designing the Soviet intermediate cartridge was assigned to a committee led by chief designer N.M. Elizarov (Н.М. Елизаров), assisted by P.V. Ryazanov (П.В. Рязанов), B.V. Semin (Б.В. Семин), and I.T. Melnikov (И.Т. Мельников). Elizarov collaborated closely with some leading weapons designers, including Fedorov, Tokarev, Simonov, and Shpagin. About 314 cartridge designs were considered theoretically, before narrowing the selection down to eight models that were physically constructed and tested. Most of the development work on the new cartridge took place at OKB-44, which was soon thereafter renamed as NII-44, and which in 1949 was merged with NII-61, itself merged with TsNIITochMash ("Central Scientific-Research Institute for Precision Machine Engineering") in 1966.

The first variant of the new cartridge was officially adopted for service after completing range trials in December 1943; it was given the GRAU index 57-N-231. This cartridge actually had a case length of 41 mm, so it is sometimes referred to as the 7.62×41. The bullet it contained was 22.8 mm long and had a core made entirely of lead. This bullet has a somewhat stubbier appearance than later 7.62×39 bullets, with its maximal radius being attained after only 13.01 mm from its tip, and it was lacking a boat tail. After some further refinements, a pilot production series of this cartridge began in March 1944.

After more detailed testing results became available, starting in 1947 the cartridge was tweaked by the Ulyanovsk Machine Building Plant to improve its accuracy and penetration. Initially, the boat tail had been omitted because the Soviet designers had assumed (incorrectly) that it would only make a difference at long ranges, when the bullet became subsonic, and the accuracy of the intermediate cartridge at these ranges was considered inconsequential. However, further testing showed that the boat tail improved accuracy even at shorter ranges, where the bullet was still supersonic. To maintain the overall mass of the bullet, after adding the boat tail, the ogival head section of the bullet was lengthened as well, making the bullet more streamlined overall. The maximum radius was now attained at some 15.95 mm from the tip and the overall length of the bullet increased to 26.8 mm. To preserve the total length of the cartridge, the case sleeve was shortened to 38.7 mm (and by rounding it is customarily referred to as 7.62×39.) Additionally, the new bullet had a core made of lead wrapped in low-carbon steel. The use of low-carbon (mild) steel was guided mostly by the desire to reuse some industrial equipment that was manufacturing the 7.62×25mm Tokarev cartridge rather than by bullet fragmentation considerations. This bullet was given the acronym "7.62 PS" (7.62 ПС). The "S" initially stood for "surrogate" (суррогатированная, surrogatirovannaya), but later the letter was taken to refer to the steel component (стальной, stal'noy) of the core, which accounted for about 50% of the core volume. The 7.62×39 cartridge equipped with the PS bullet finally overcame all objections of the GAU in mid-1947, when it was ordered into series production and given the index 57-N-231S. Field tests of the round and the new prototype AK-47 were carried out at the NIPSVO from December 16, 1947, to January 11, 1948.

The design that was ultimately selected by the Soviets has more dimensional similarities to the GECO cartridge used in the Vollmer M35 than with the Polte round used by the later German Sturmgewehr. Some authors, including C. J. Chivers, have speculated that the Soviets may have had access to the works of GECO and Vollmer during 1940 when Hitler allowed a large number of Soviet engineers to tour various German armament factories. Anthony G. Williams, however, argues that the Soviet M43 round was so different that it was possible to dismiss the idea that it was a copy of any German round in existence at the time.

The 57-N-231S cartridge used a "bimetallic" (steel and copper) case. In the early 1960s, a "lacquered" steel case was introduced, and the new cartridge was initially given the designation 57-N-231SL. In an effort to simplify terminology, sometime thereafter the 57-N-231 designation was recycled to denote all steel-core 7.62×39 Soviet ammunition, irrespective of case build.

In the mid-1950s, Elizarov's team, now working at NII-61, developed a special subsonic bullet for the 7.62×39 cartridge. It was adopted for service in 1962, and given the army designation "7.62 US" (US stood for уменьшенной скоростью, meaning "reduced speed") and the GRAU index 57-N-231U. The subsonic bullet was considerably longer (33.62 mm) and heavier (12.5 g) than the PS bullet, and also had a different, non-layered core structure. The core of its head section was entirely made of tool steel, followed by another section entirely made of lead. The subsonic bullet also has a larger maximum diameter of 7.94 mm compared to all other 7.62×39 bullets that peak at 7.91 mm diameter; the larger diameter of the lead-core section was intended to provide a tighter fit to the barrel by better engaging the rifling grooves. The 7.62 subsonic ammo was intended to be fired from AK-47-type rifles equipped with the PBS-1 silencer and developed a muzzle velocity of about 285–300 m/s. For recognition, this ammo typically has the bullet tips painted black with a green band underneath.

After 1989, the regular (PS) Russian bullets started to be manufactured with a steel core with a higher carbon concentration and subjected to heat treatment. This change improved their penetration by 1.5–2 times. It is not possible to externally distinguish these bullets from the earlier, softer PS ones except by year of fabrication. At about the same time, tool steel was adopted for a normal velocity 7.62×39 bullet. Called BP, this bullet was developed in the 1980s and 1990s. It was officially adopted for Russian service in 2002 under the service name "7.62 BP", and with the GRAU designation 7N23. The BP bullet is claimed to achieve over three times the penetration of the PS bullet; it can defeat the Russian bullet-proof vest with designation 6B5 at distances below 250 meters. The BP cartridge has the tip of its bullet painted black. The BP bullet itself is slightly longer (27.4 mm) compared to the PS bullet, but has the same mass of 7.9 grams.

At the same 1943 meeting that decided the development new cartridge, the Soviet planners decided that a whole range of new small arms should use it, including a semi-automatic carbine, a fully automatic rifle, and a light machine gun. Design contests for these new weapons began in earnest in 1944.

== Variants ==
=== M43 ===
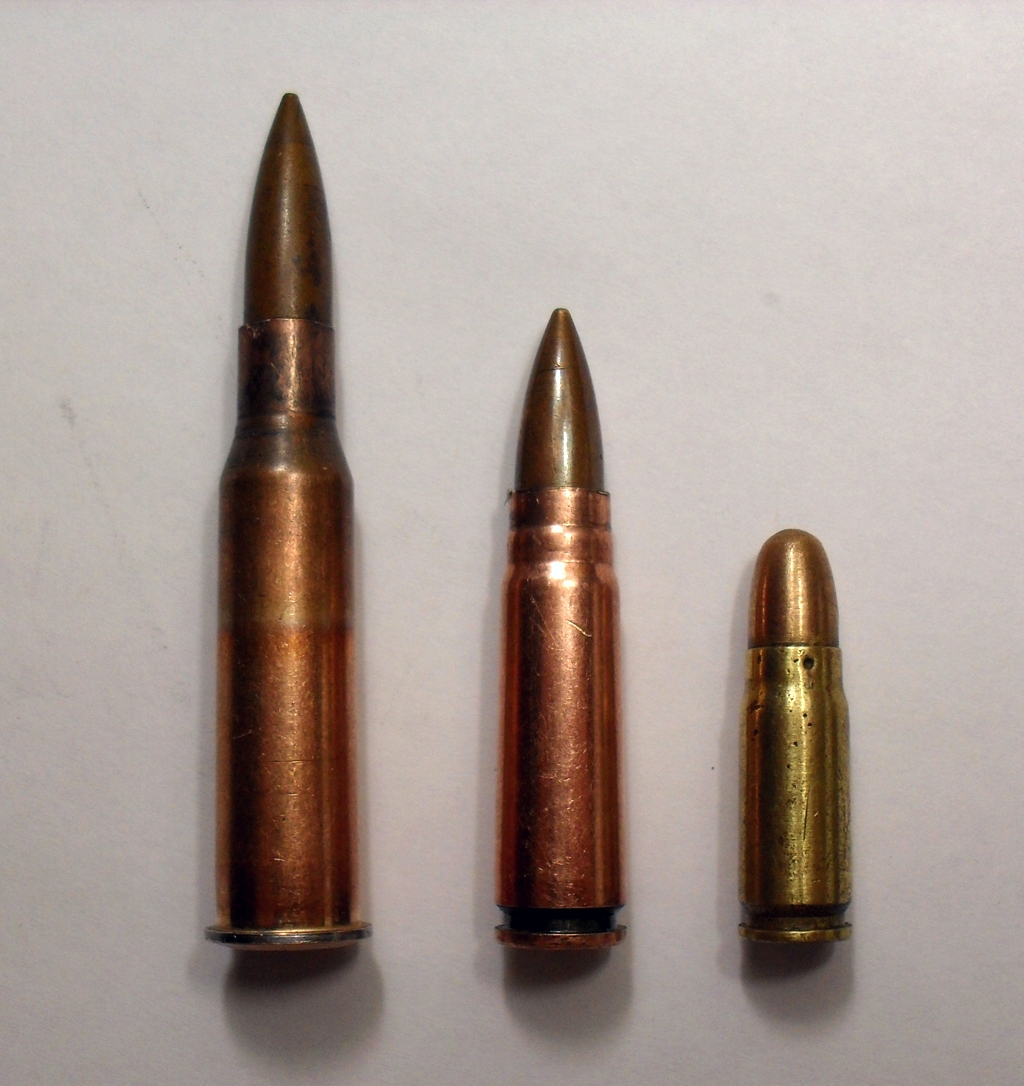
From left to right: 7.62×54mmR, 7.62×39 mm and 7.62×25mm Tokarev

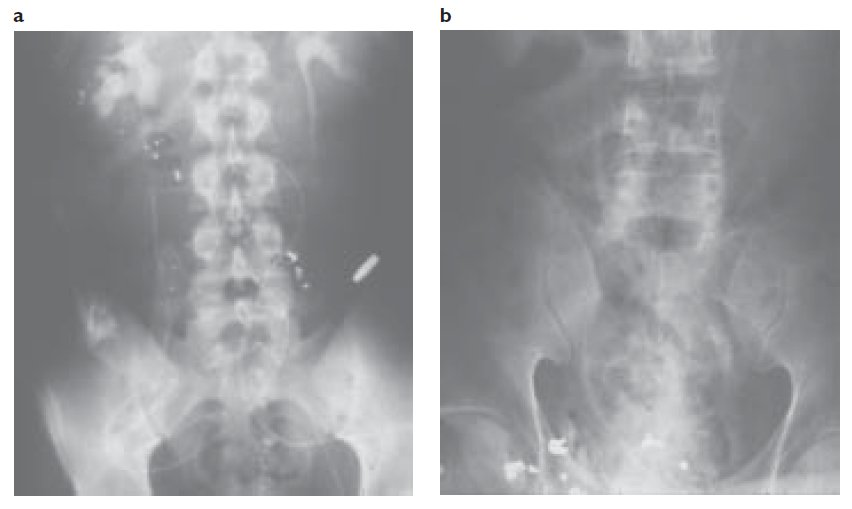
7.62×39 mm bullet wound on an American soldier from the Vietnam War

The original Soviet M43 bullets are 123 grain boat-tail bullets with a copper-plated steel jacket, a large steel core, and some lead between the core and the jacket. The cartridge itself consisted of a Berdan-primed, highly tapered (usually steel) case which seats the bullet and contains the powder charge. The taper makes it very easy to feed and extract the round, since there is little contact with the chamber walls until the round is fully seated. This taper is what causes the AK-47 to have distinctively curved magazines (helping to distinguish AK-47s from AK-74s, which feed from a much straighter magazine). While the bullet design has gone through a few redesigns, the cartridge itself remains largely unchanged. The ballistic coefficient (G7 BC) of the M1943 pattern full metal jacket boat bullet is 0.138.

The complete solidity of the M43 projectile causes its only drawback—it is very stable, even while traversing tissue. It begins to yaw only after traversing nearly 26 cm (10 in) of tissue. This greatly reduces the potential wounding effectiveness of the projectile.

=== Type 56: Chinese mild steel core ===
Chinese (Type 56) military ammunition (developed in 1956) is an M43-style cartridge with a mild steel core (MSC) and a copper-plated steel jacket. In 1956, the Chinese developed their own 7.62×39 mm assault rifle, also designated Type 56. It is a variant of the Soviet-designed AK-47 (specifically Type 3 and AKM) assault rifles. Production started in 1956 at State Factory 66 but was eventually handed over to Norinco, who continues to manufacture the rifle, primarily for export. Norinco developed and produced 7.62×39mm ammunition for the Type 56 rifle. The Chinese ammunition (as well as all other M43 ammunition) is currently banned from importation in the United States because U.S. federal law classifies the round as an armor-piercing handgun round. This classification is based on materials and bullet design rather than on empirical ability to penetrate armor.

=== Kal. 7,62mm×38 "Dutch" ===
In the late 1950s West Germany was investigating the concept of an intermediate service cartridge (Mittelpatrone). As part of a ballistic study, the West German government commissioned reverse-engineered copies of the 7.62 mm M43 round. It was made for use in SKS rifles and RPD light machine guns that they had obtained from East German Army defectors. The Dutch firm Nederlandsche Wapen-en Munitiefabriek (NWM) was contracted in 1958 to make the ammunition. Specifications based on captured samples were drawn up in April 1958 and production began in 1959.

There were two different cartridges commissioned. The first was a lead-core bullet (Weichkern, or "soft core") with a gilding-metal jacket. It had a plain tip and red lacquer around the primer annulus to indicate that it was standard Ball ammunition. The other was an armour piercing bullet (Eisenkern, or "iron core") with a mild steel core and a gilding-metal jacket. It had black lacquer around the primer annulus to indicate it was armour piercing. (The early rounds were marked Pantser (Dutch: "armour", i.e. armour-piercing) on the packaging and had a black lacquered tip as per NATO standard markings). The brass cases were required to have a length between 38.36 and 38.7 mm, so the cartridge was designated the "7.62×38 mm". It was loaded with Kugelpulver [German: "ball powder"] and used non-corrosive Sinoxid primers. The headstamp bore the metric designation (7.62×38 mm) at 12 o'clock, the 2-digit year at 4 o'clock, and the contractor (NWM) at 8 o'clock.

They were packed in 25-round cartons. The early cartons were marked in Dutch with black text on a plain white label. The later cartons were marked in German with a colored border (a red border for ball and a black border for armour-piercing).

=== M67 ===
In the 1960s, Yugoslavia experimented with new bullet designs to produce a round with a superior wounding profile, speed, and accuracy to the M43. The M67 projectile is shorter and flatter-based than the M43. This is mainly due to the removal of the mild steel insert. This has the side effect of shifting the center of gravity rearward in comparison to the M43. This allows the projectile to destabilize nearly 17 cm (6.7 in) earlier in tissue. This causes a pair of large stretch cavities at a depth likely to cause effective wound trauma. When the temporary stretch cavity intersects with the skin at the exit area, a larger exit wound will result, which takes longer to heal. Additionally, when the stretch cavity intersects a stiff organ like the liver, it will cause damage to that organ. However, the wounding potential of M67 is mostly limited to the small permanent wound channel the bullet itself makes, especially when the bullet does not yaw (tumble).

=== Commercial ammunition ===
Commercial Russian-made 7.62×39 mm ammunition, such as those sold under the Wolf Ammunition brand name, are also available in full metal jacket (FMJ), soft-point (SP) and hollow-point (HP) variety. The SP bullets offer improved expansion. Commercial American Made 7.62×39 mm Non-Corrosive Steel Case ammunition, such as those made by and sold under the Advanced Armament Company brand name, are also available in full metal jacket (FMJ) and black tip variety Commercial ammunition differs from most military ammunition in regard to bullet composition, specifically heavy use of lead instead of soft steel or tool steel.

== Cartridge dimensions ==
The 7.62×39 mm has a 2.31 mL (35.6 gr H_{2}O) cartridge case capacity.

7.62×39 mm maximum C.I.P. cartridge dimensions. All sizes in millimeters (mm).

Americans define the shoulder angle at alpha/2 ≈ 16.4 degrees. The common rifling twist rate for this cartridge is 240 mm (1 in 9.45 in), 4 grooves, Ø lands = 7.62 millimetres (0.300 in), Ø grooves = 7.92 millimetres (0.312 in), land width = 3.81 millimetres (0.150 in) and the primer type is usually large rifle, with the exception of commercial Remington/UMC brass using small rifle primers.

According to the official C.I.P. (French: Commission Internationale Permanente pour l'Epreuve des Armes à Feu Portatives) rulings the 7.62×39 mm can handle up to 355.00 MPa (51,488 psi) P_{max} piezo pressure. In C.I.P. regulated countries every rifle cartridge combo has to be proofed at 125% of this maximum C.I.P. pressure to certify for sale to consumers. This means that 7.62×39 mm chambered arms in C.I.P. regulated countries are currently (2015) proof tested at 444.00 MPa (64,397 psi) PE piezo pressure.

The SAAMI maximum average pressure (MAP) for this cartridge is 310 MPa (45,000 psi) piezo pressure.

== Basic specifications of 21st century Russian service loads ==
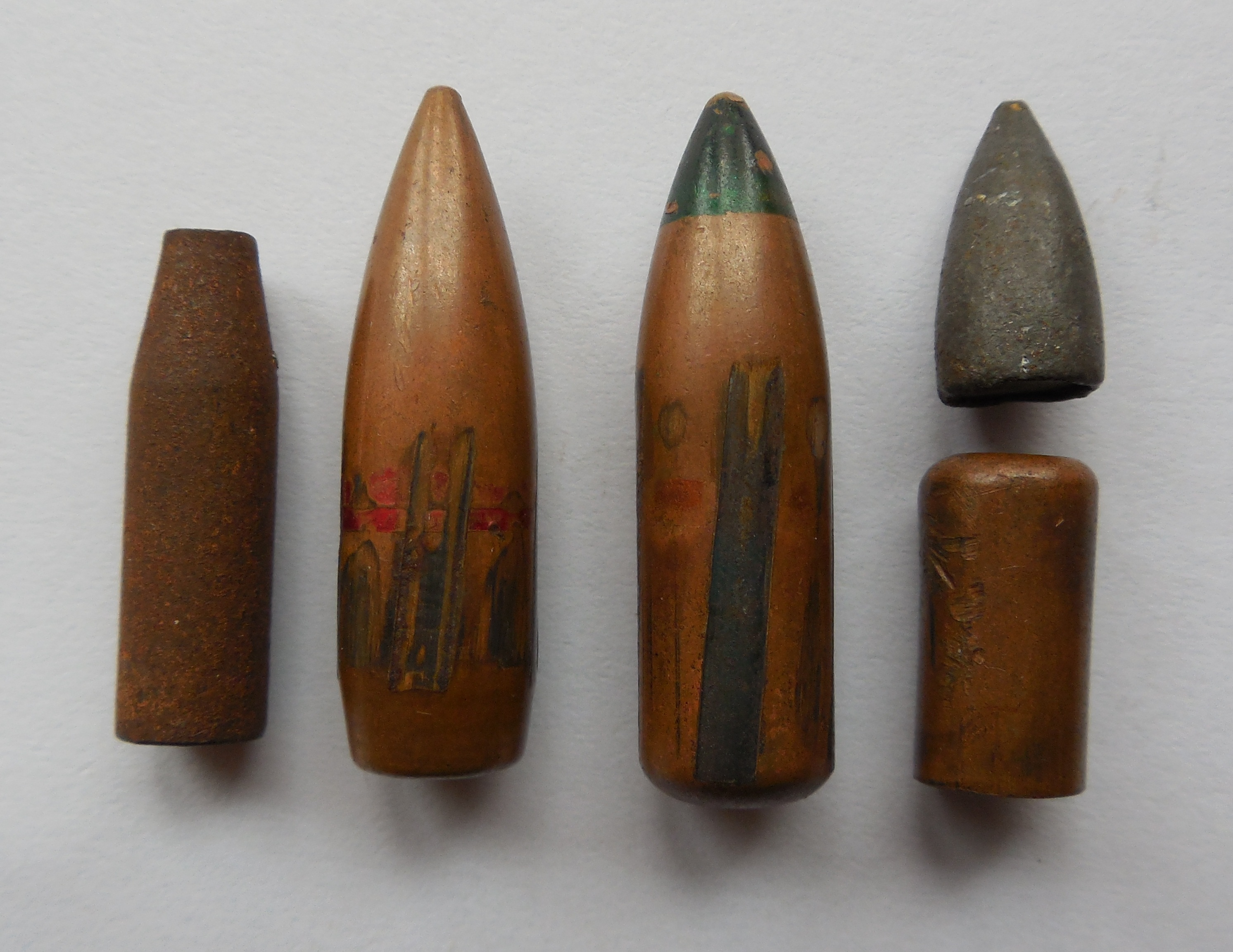
From left to right: steel core, 57-N-231 standard AK military bullet with steel core, green tipped 57-N-231P tracer, the tracer cup (open at the bottom, made from copper washed steel) and lead tip. The jackets of both bullets are copper washed steel.

The 7.62×39 mm rounds in use with the Armed Forces of the Russian Federation are designed for AKM assault rifles and AK-derived light machine guns. As per 2003 there were several variants of 7.62×39 mm produced for various purposes. All use clad metal as case material.

The 57-N-231 conventional steel-core bullet is designed to engage personnel and weapon systems. The bullet has a steel core and has a ballistic coefficient (G1 BC) of approximately 0.304 and (G7 BC) of approximately 0.152. The tip has no distinguishing colour. It can penetrate a 6 mm (0.2 in) thick St3 steel plate at 300 m (328 yd).

The 7N23 armour-piercing bullet, introduced in 2002, has a 3.6 g (55.6 gr) sharp-pointed steel penetrator made of steel U12A and retains the soft lead plug in the nose for jacket discarding. The bullet has a black tip.

The 57-N-231P is a tracer round designed for fire adjustment and target designation. The bullet has a green tip and the tracer burns for 800 m (875 yd). The 57-T-231PM1 is an improved tracer round which initiates at 50 m (55 yd) from the muzzle and burns for 850 m (930 yd).

| Cartridge designation | 57-N-231 | 57-N-231P (tracer) | 57-T-231PM1 (tracer) |
|---|---|---|---|
| Cartridge weight | 16.3 g (252 gr) | 16.1 g (248 gr) | 16.05 g (248 gr) |
| Bullet weight | 7.9 g (121.9 gr) | 7.57 g (116.8 gr) | 7.55 g (116.5 gr) |
| Muzzle velocity | 718 m/s (2,356 ft/s) | 718 m/s (2,356 ft/s) | 718 m/s (2,356 ft/s) |
| Muzzle energy | 2,036 J (1,502 ft⋅lbf) | 1,951 J (1,439 ft⋅lbf) | 1,946 J (1,435 ft⋅lbf) |
| Accuracy of fire at 300 m (328 yd) R_{50}^{[A]} | 75 mm (3.0 in) | 140 mm (5.5 in) | 140 mm (5.5 in) |

^{A} R_{50} at 300 m (328 yd) means the closest 50 percent of the shot group will all be within a circle of the mentioned diameter at 300 m (328 yd).
^{B} Military 7.62×39 mm ammunition is purportedly tested to function well in temperatures ranging from −50 to 50 °C (−58 to 122 °F) cementing its usefulness in cold polar or hot desert conditions.

== Hunting and sport use ==
Since approximately 1990, the 7.62×39 mm cartridge has seen some use in hunting arms in the U.S. for hunting game up to the size of whitetail deer, as it is slightly less powerful than the .30-30 Winchester round, and has a similar ballistic profile with a much smaller case. Large numbers of imported semiautomatic rifles, such as the SKS and AK-47 clones and variants, are available in this caliber. Romania produces a 7.62×39mm AK-style WASR-10 modern sporting rifle designed for the sporting market. The lower cost and higher availability of military surplus ammunition makes this cartridge attractive for many civilian hunters, plinkers, target and metallic silhouette shooters.

In addition, several AR-15 manufacturers have produced the 7.62×39mm option. Some current and past companies include AR-Stoner, Armalite, Colt, Rock River Arms, Olympic Arms, DPMS, Del-Ton Inc, and ModelOne Sales. Custom builds and conversion kits are available as well. Wide availability and low-cost ammo with a wide variety of manufacturers make it a much lower cost of operation compared to other 5.56×45 mm alternatives. Conversions include a new bolt, firing pin, extractor, barrel, and magazine. On December 1, 2014, CMMG introduced the Mk47 Mutant (later rebranded to Resolute line) rifle in 7.62×39 mm, using a cut-down AR10 bolt.

Ruger produces the Ruger Mini Thirty as a 7.62×39 mm version of its popular Ruger Mini-14 rifle. In 2017, Ruger began production of a model of the American Rifle in 7.62×39. They have also offered variants of the bolt-action M77 in this caliber.

Remington Arms advertised the compact Model 799 Mini Mauser bolt-action rifle chambered in 7.62×39 mm in 2006. The Mauser action is a copy of the Gewehr 98 model rifle's action. CZ-USA sells the CZ 527 carbine, a "micro length Mauser style" bolt-action rifle chambered in 7.62×39mm and .223 Remington.

Savage Arms has introduced (around 2010–2011) their own bolt-action 10 FCM scout rifle in 7.62×39 mm. Both the SIG Sauer SIG516 Russian and the SIG 556R are chambered in 7.62×39 mm. In 2016, Howa introduced a bolt-action rifle chambered in 7.62×39 mm that uses their long-standing Howa M1500 barreled action. The model is called the Howa Mini-Action and is specifically designed for shorter intermediate cartridges.

== Gallery ==
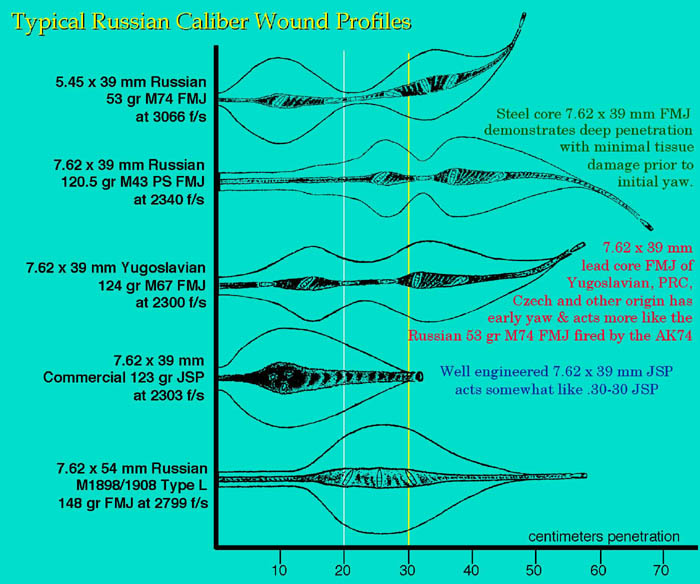
Wound profiles of Russian small-arms ammunition compiled by Martin Fackler on behalf of the U.S. military

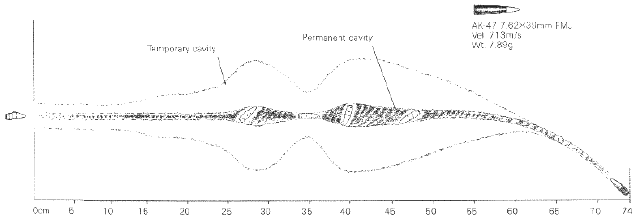
Wound ballistics profile of 7.62×39 mm

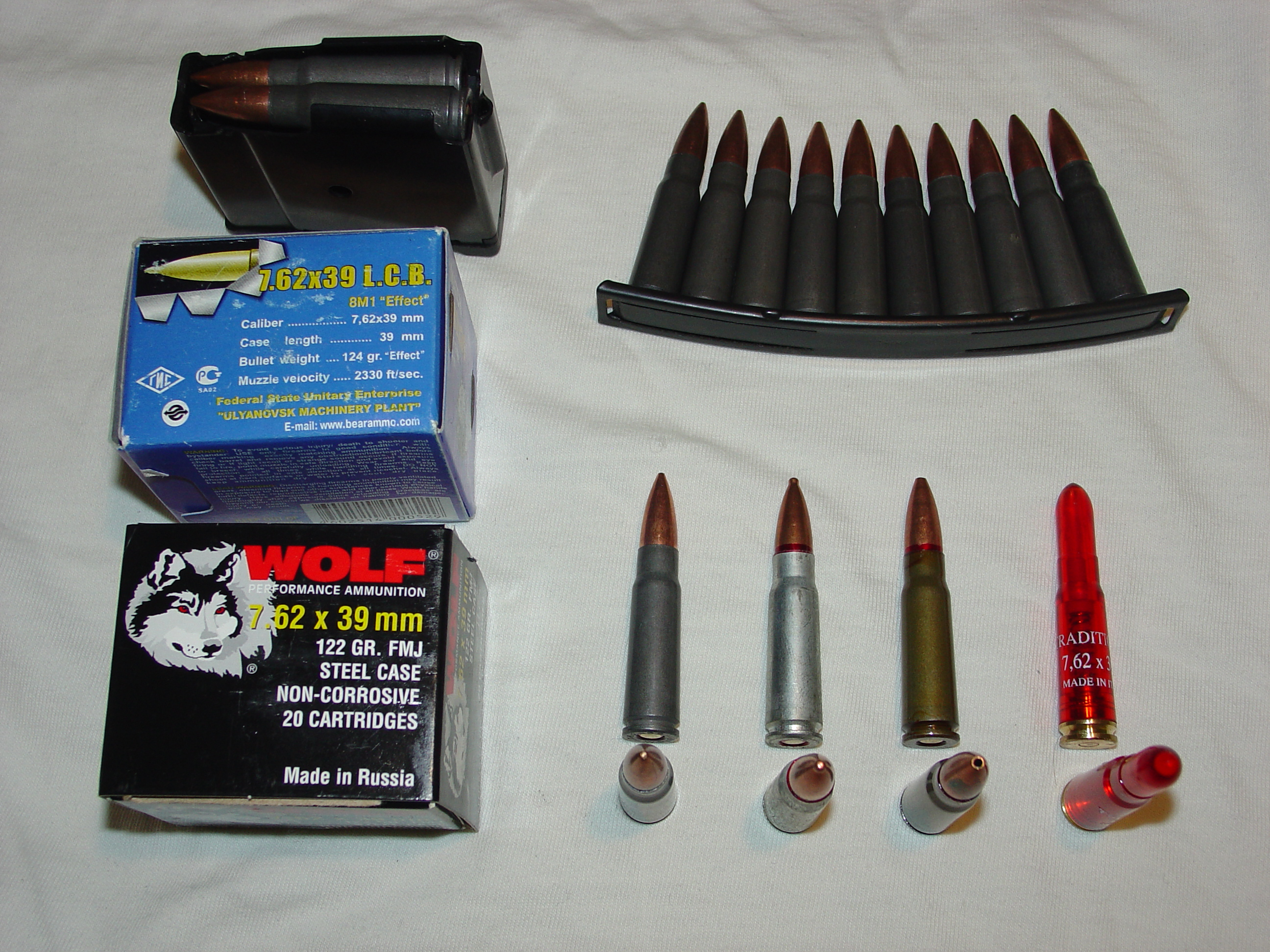
7.62×39 mm ammunition and snap cap

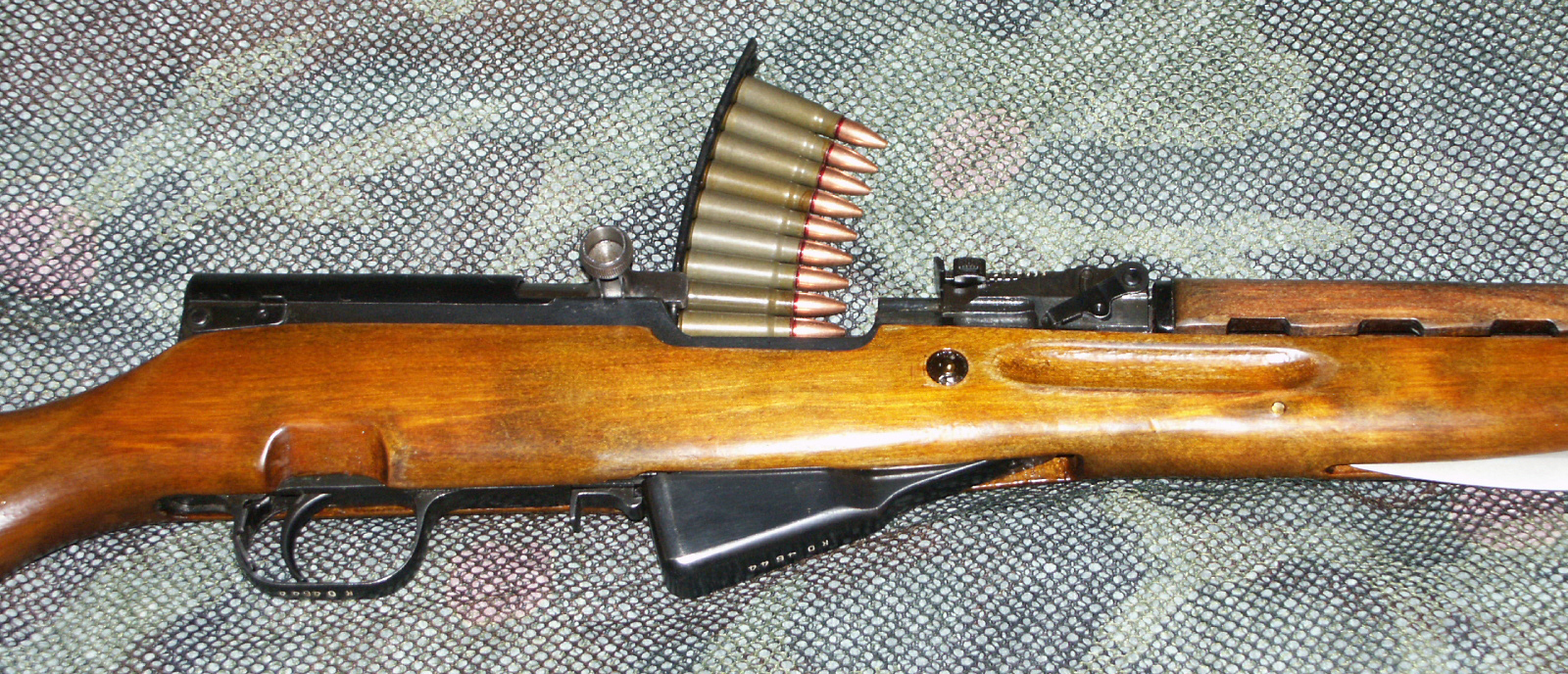
SKS rifle with a 10-round stripper clip of 7.62×39 mm ammunition

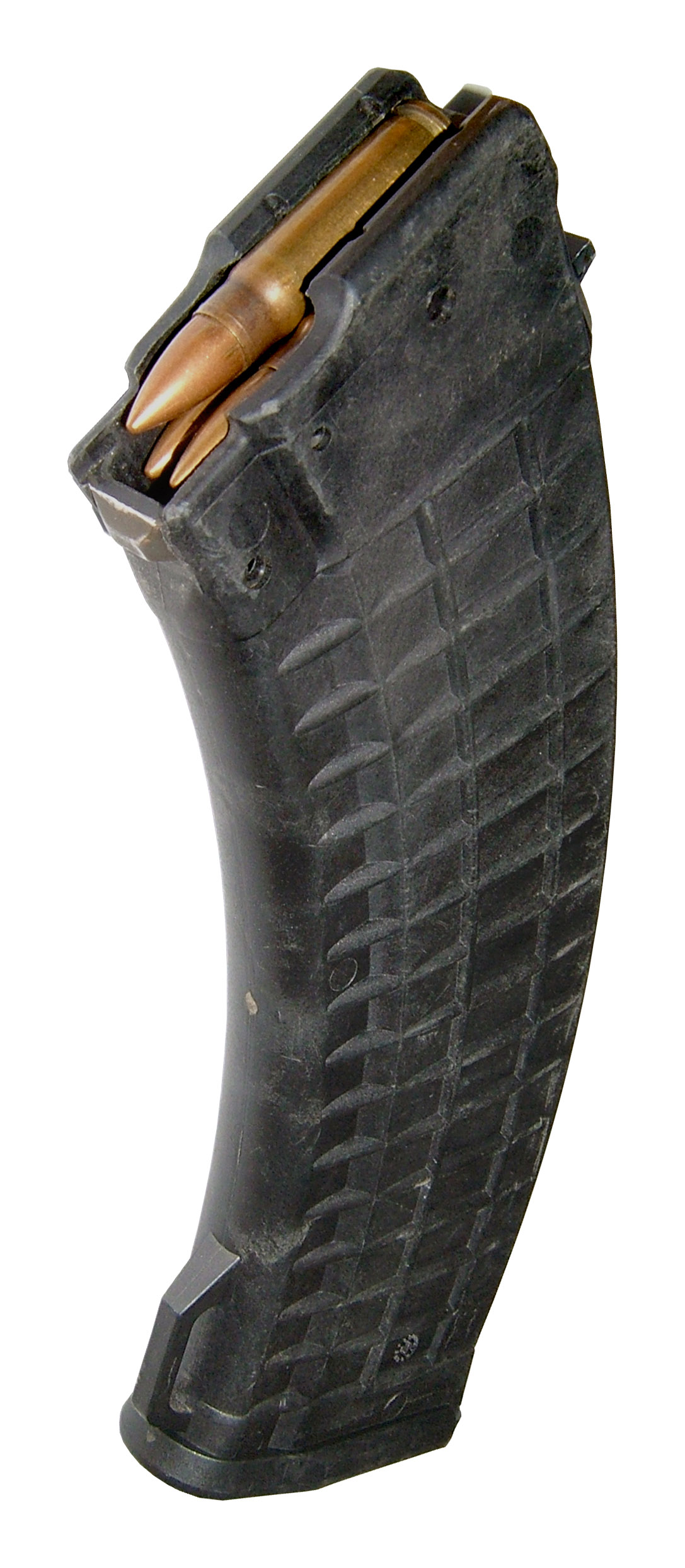
Magazine for a Finnish RK-62 loaded with 7.62×39 mm ammunition

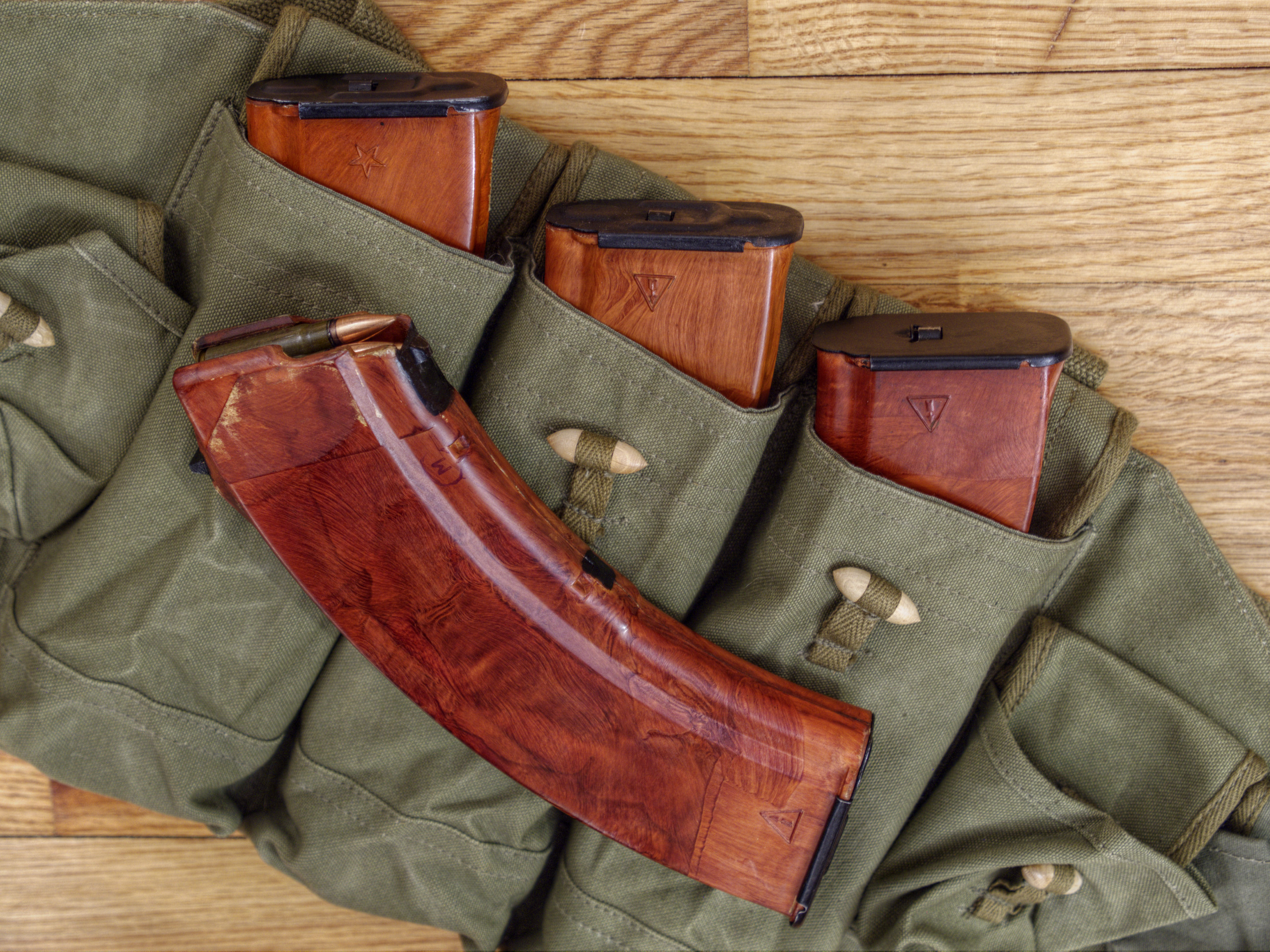
"Bakelite" polymer AK magazines loaded with 7.62×39 mm ammunition

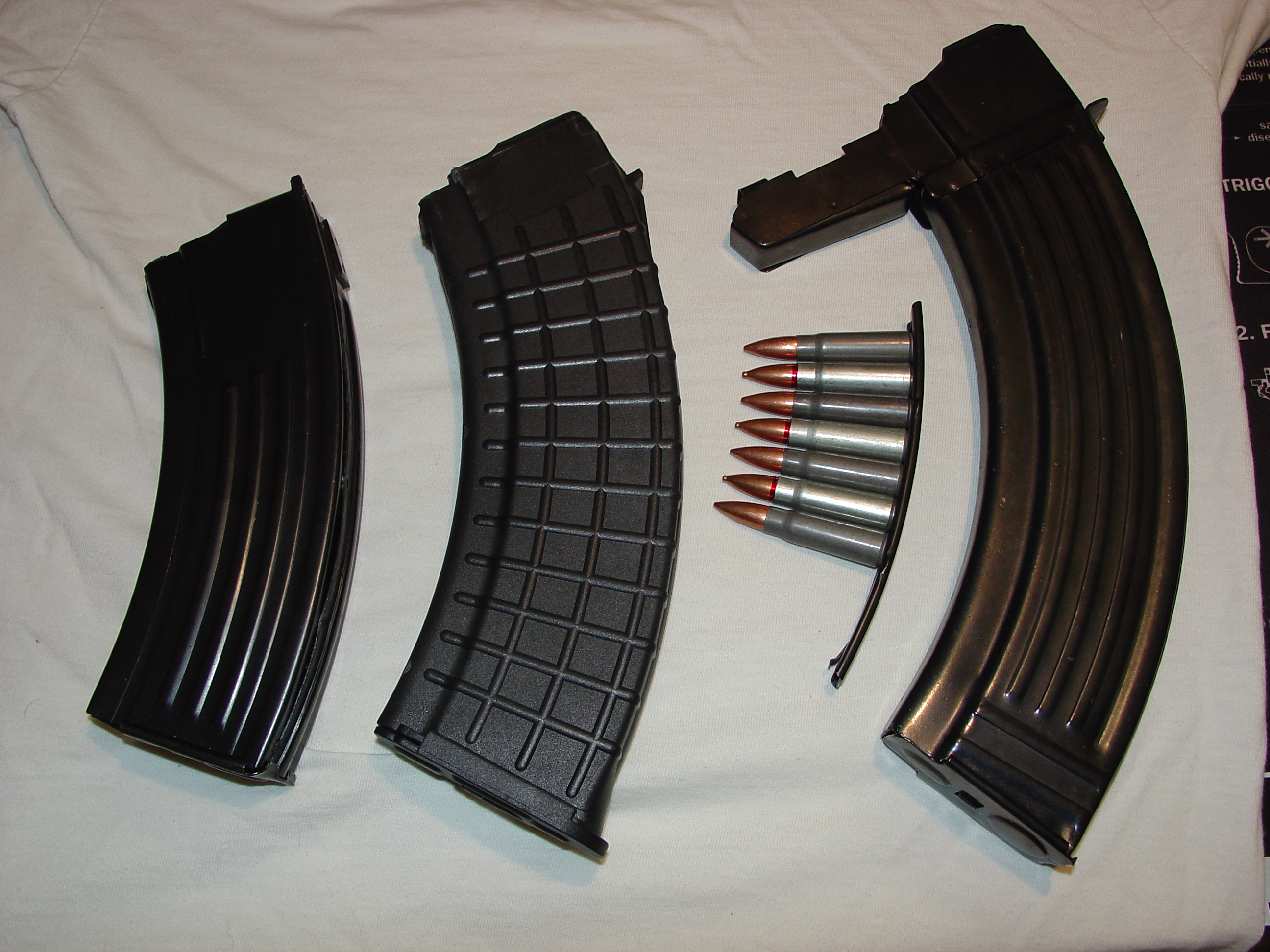
Magazines for three different 7.62×39 mm rifles and a stripper clip loaded with ammunition

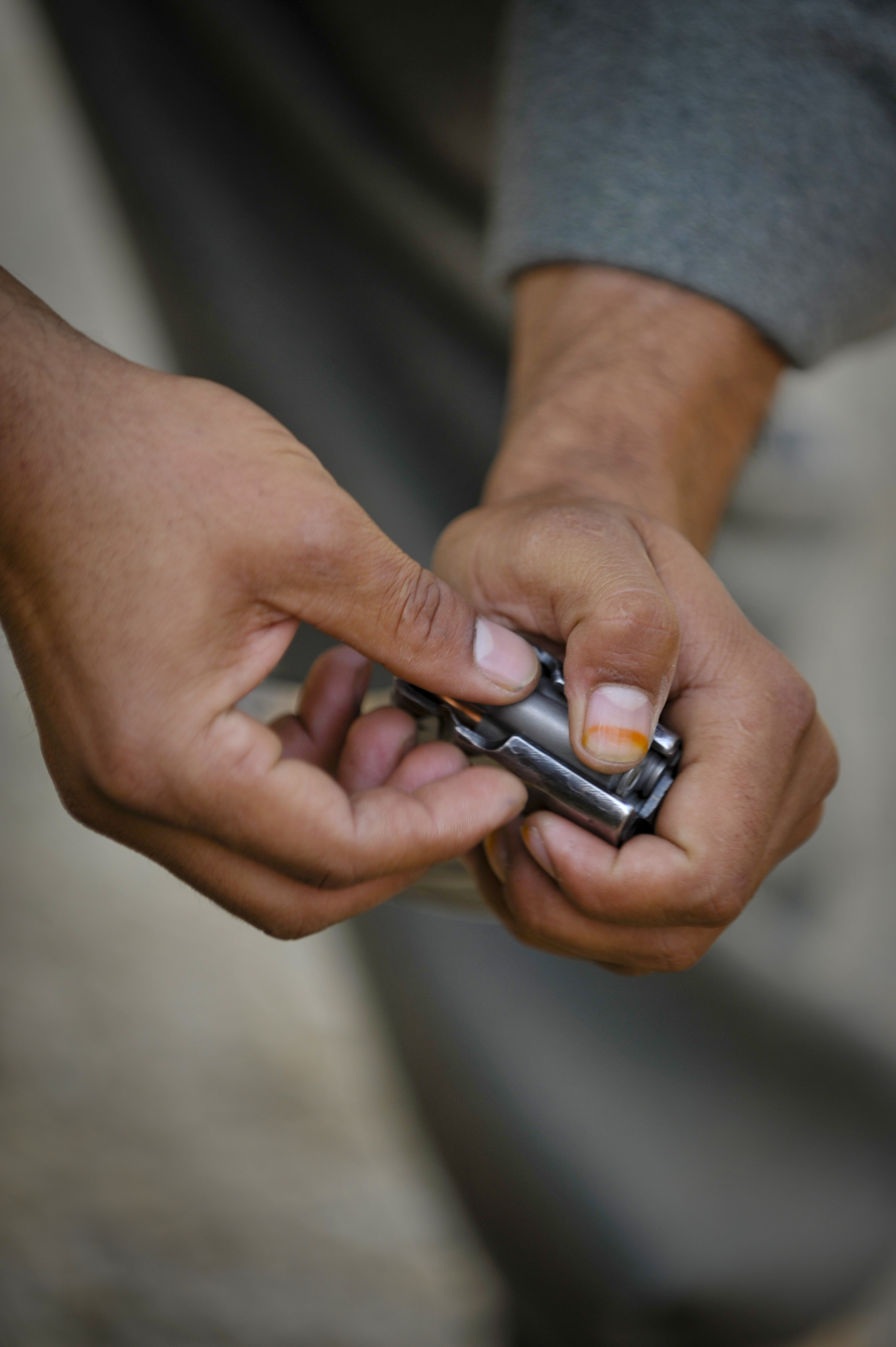
Loading 7.62×39 mm ammunition into an AK magazine

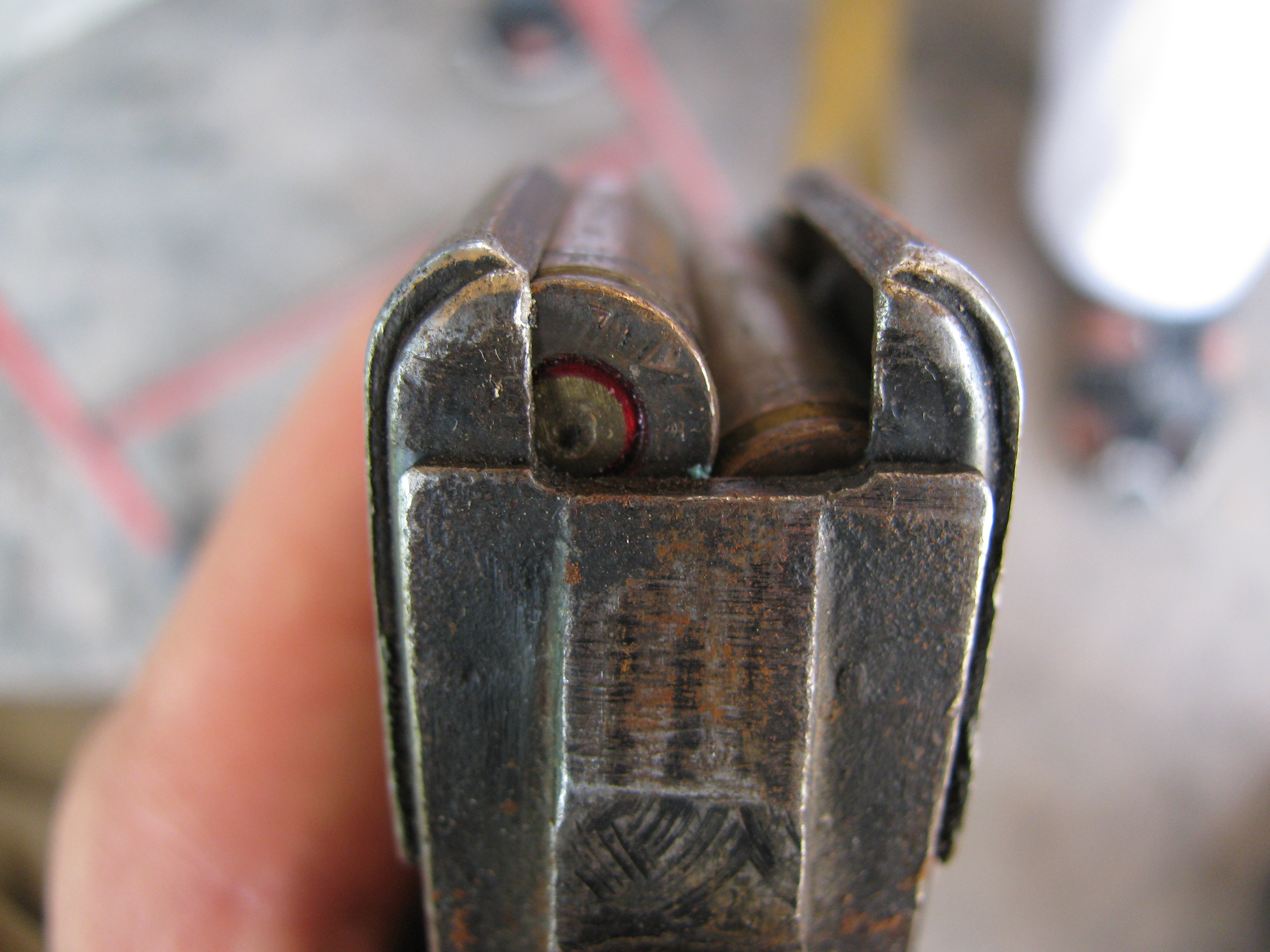
An AK magazine loaded with 7.62×39 mm ammunition

== See also ==
- List of 7.62×39mm firearms
- .220 Russian
- .300 AAC Blackout
- 7.62 mm caliber
- 9×39mm
- List of rifle cartridges
- Table of handgun and rifle cartridges
