= Weatherby Varmintmaster =

Weatherby VarmintMaster
- Type: Bolt-action rifle
- Place of origin: United States

Production history
- Designer: Roy Weatherby, J.P. Sauer & Sohn of West Germany
- Designed: 1963
- Manufacturer: Weatherby, Inc
- Produced: 1963–1994

Specifications
- Cartridge: .224 Weatherby Magnum; .22-250
- Action: Cock upon open bolt-action rifle
- Feed system: five-round internal box magazine
- Sights: Drilled and tapped for scope mounts. Iron sight included on some models.

The Weatherby Varmintmaster is a lighter quicker-handling version of the Weatherby Mark V. It was first offered for sale in 1963 in two barrel lengths: a 24-inch standard weight and 26-inch heavy weight. The price then was $295, same as the Mark V. Compared with the Mark V it weighs 40% less with most parts being reduced in size by 20%. The trigger assemblies are identical. Having a smaller bolt diameter, the Varmintmaster uses a six-lug locking bolt as opposed to nine for the original magnum-sized Mark V. Chambered in .224 Weatherby Magnum with a 55-grain bullet, it achieves a muzzle velocity of 3,750 feet per second (1,140 m/s). Weatherby ceased production of its smallest rifle in 1994.
