= .224 Weatherby Magnum =

Rifle cartridge developed by Roy Weatherby

- Type: Rifle
- Place of origin: USA

Production history
- Designer: Roy Weatherby
- Designed: 1963

Specifications
- Parent case: None, proprietary
- Case type: Belted, bottleneck
- Bullet diameter: .224 in (5.7 mm)
- Neck diameter: .252 in (6.4 mm)
- Shoulder diameter: .394 in (10.0 mm)
- Base diameter: .415 in (10.5 mm)
- Rim diameter: .430 in (10.9 mm)
- Case length: 1.923 in (48.8 mm)
- Overall length: 2.330 in (59.2 mm)
- Rifling twist: Formerly 1-14” (now 1-8”)
- Primer type: Large rifle

Ballistic performance
| Bullet mass/type | Velocity | Energy |
|---|---|---|
| 37 gr (2 g) Hammer Custom | 4,125 ft/s (1,257 m/s) | 1,398 ft⋅lbf (1,895 J) |
| 50 gr (3 g) Hornady V-MAX | 3,700 ft/s (1,100 m/s) | 1,520 ft⋅lbf (2,060 J) |
| 55 gr (4 g) Hornady SP | 3,650 ft/s (1,110 m/s) | 1,627 ft⋅lbf (2,206 J) |
| 80.5 gr (5 g) Berger FBT | 2,925 ft/s (892 m/s) | 1,529 ft⋅lbf (2,073 J) |
- Test barrel length: 24; Source: Weatherby

.224 Weatherby Magnum maximum C.I.P. cartridge dimensions. All sizes in millimeters (mm) plus Imperial (inches).

The .224 Weatherby Magnum (5.56×49mmB) is a sporting cartridge that Weatherby introduced in 1963. The chambering was discontinued in 1994 and reintroduced in 2025. It is the only belted magnum varmint cartridge. It is a proprietary cartridge with no major firearms manufacturers chambering rifles for it other than Weatherby. It was originally called the .224 Weatherby Varmintmaster when it was introduced alongside the Weatherby Varmintmaster rifle, but the rifle was discontinued in 1994 and the cartridge was renamed.

== Design ==
Roy Weatherby devised the .224 years prior to its commercial introduction. The delay was at least in part due to the unavailability of a suitable action. An earlier high-velocity .22 caliber round from Weatherby called the .220 Weatherby Rocket was based on the .220 Swift, though it was never manufactured.

== Performance ==
Performance is similar to the popular .22-250. Once Remington introduced rifles in .22-250, they quickly superseded the .224 Weatherby Magnum in popularity, forcing Weatherby to chamber rifles in .22-250. This was the first time that Weatherby offered rifles in a commercial chambering.

Performance for 55 grain bullet (BC of 0.235)
| | Muzzle | 100 Yds | 200 Yds | 300 Yds | 400 Yds | 500 Yds |
|---|---|---|---|---|---|---|
| Trajectory | - | 2.8 | 3.7 | 0 | -9.8 | -27.9 |
| Energy (ft·lbf) | 1627 | 1244 | 944 | 705 | 516 | 370 |
| Velocity (ft/s) | 3650 | 3192 | 2780 | 2403 | 2056 | 1741 |

== Sporting use ==
.22 caliber rifles are legal in some areas for big game up to the size of deer or larger. Convention holds the .224 Weatherby and similar cartridges are better suited to long-range varminting. Similar statements are made concerning other "big" 22 caliber cartridges like the .220 Swift and .223 WSSM.

Currently many states in the United States do allow 22 caliber rifles on big game, but the majority require a minimum of 6mm. Well known firearms author P.O. Ackley believed that fast 22 caliber cartridges were suitable for medium-large game. Craig Boddington has said that such cartridges are suitable for smaller deer. Bullets suited for hunting big-game are available from major manufacturers such as Nosler and Barnes.

== See also ==
- 5 mm caliber, other cartridges of 5–6 mm (.200–.236 in) caliber.
- List of rifle cartridges
- Table of handgun and rifle cartridges
