= CMMG Mk47 Mutant =

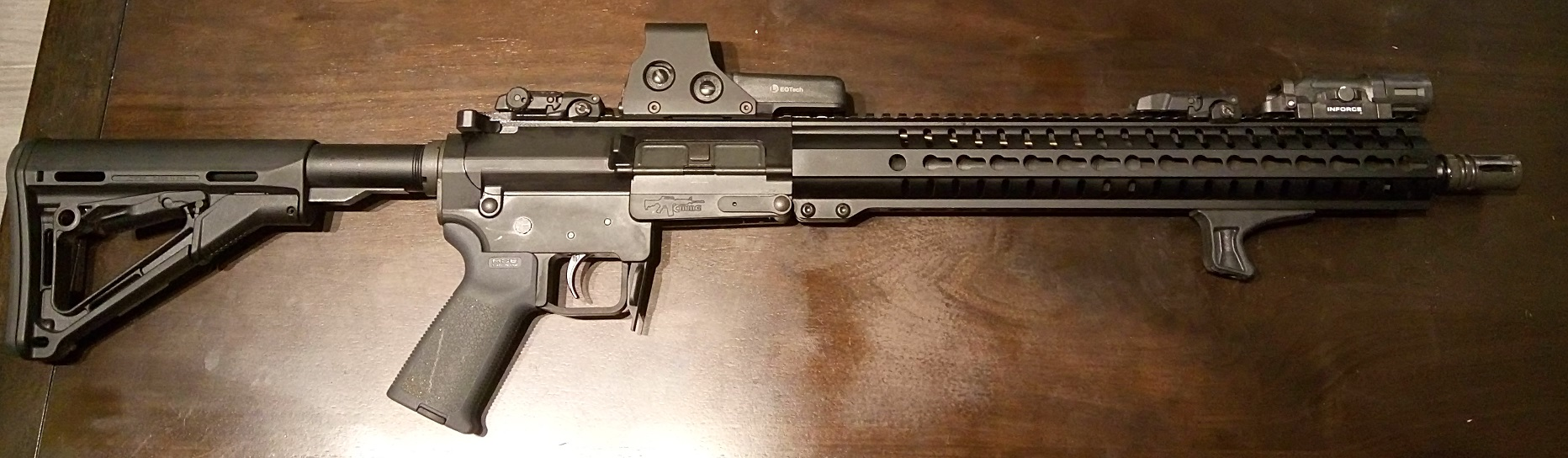
- A CMMG Mk47 Mutant with an EOTech sight, handgrip and BUIS.
- Type: Semi-automatic rifle
- Place of origin: United States

Production history
- Designer: CMMG Inc.
- Manufacturer: CMMG Inc.
- Produced: 2014–present
- Variants: See Variants

Specifications
- Cartridge: 7.62×39mm M43
- Action: Gas-operated, rotating bolt
- Feed system: Detachable box magazine
- Sights: Iron sights

The CMMG Mk47 Mutant is an American-made semi-automatic rifle chambered in 7.62×39mm, made by CMMG [Central Missouri Machine Gun] Inc. It can accept all types of Kalashnikov pattern magazines, including steel, polymer and drum magazines.

== History ==
The Mk47 was publicly announced for a release in 2014. In 2015, CMMG released its first production Mk47s to stores throughout the US.

According to CMMG Production Manager Tyson Bradshaw, he mentioned that CMMG made the rifle due to the need of "consumers to have a reliable, U.S.-made rifle that could properly handle the dimensions of the 7.62×39mm cartridge. To do this properly, it required CMMG to build the rifle around the caliber. Using AK magazines was an easy decision to make, because they are known to be some of the most reliable magazines available that work properly with the tapered cartridge".

In SHOT Show 2015, CMMG representatives have suggested the possibility that they can do a variant of the rifle based on the 5.45×39mm caliber.

== Design ==
The Mk47 Mutant has an AR-10-sized bolt carrier, which was enlarged, with a CMMG RKM KeyMod handguard and an upper/lower receiver manufactured from 7075-T6 billet aluminum.

The rifle has an AR-15-based pistol grip, safety selector, trigger group and a buffer tube. It was influenced by the CMMG Mk3 assault rifles. The Mk47 relies on a direct impingement gas system.

For rifles/pistols being marketed to California, they are sold with Vepr 10-round magazines and with the mandated bullet button on the magazine release.

The Mk47 is fitted with its iconic Kalashnikov styled curved magazine with the capacity of 30 rounds.

== Variants ==
The following variants are made by CMMG:

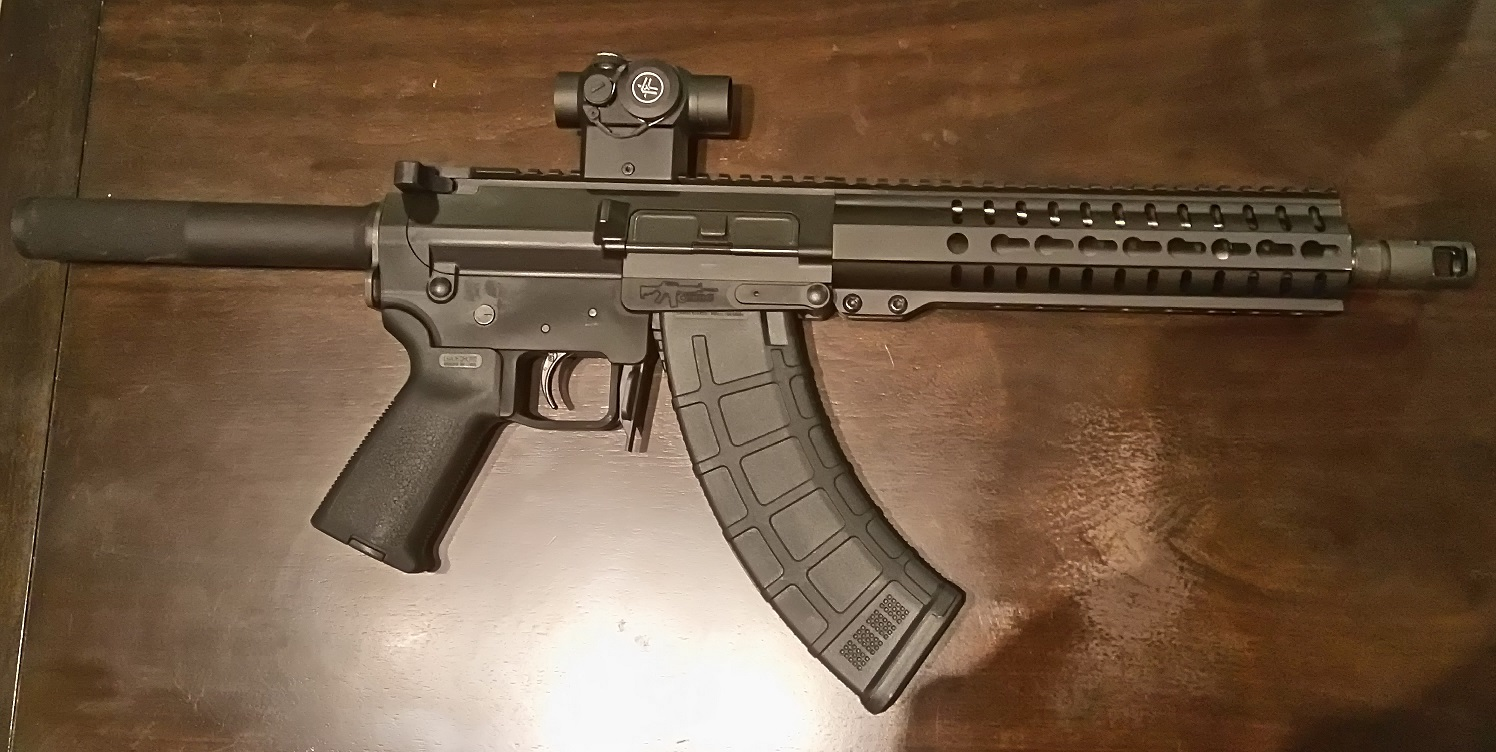
Pistol version of the CMMG Mk47 Mutant

- CMMG Mk47 K Pistol - Has a 10" medium taper profile barrel with a Magpul MOE pistol grip and a CMMG single stage trigger.
- CMMG Mk47 K Short Barrel Rifle - Same specs with the K Pistol, with the addition of a Magpul CTR buttstock.
- CMMG Mk47 Mutant AKM - Has a 16.10" medium taper profile barrel with a SV brake and a CMMG single stage trigger with a Magpul MOE pistol grip and CTR buttstock.
- CMMG Mk47 Mutant AKM CA - Has a 16" medium taper profile barrel with an SV brake with a CMMG single stage trigger.
- CMMG Mk47 Mutant AKM 2 CA - Same specs with the AKM CA, but equipped with a Geissele SS trigger.
- CMMG Mk47 Mutant T CA - Has a 16" medium taper profile barrel, CMMG single stage trigger, A4 6-Position Collapsible Stock and an A2 Pistol Grip.
- CMMG Mk47 AKS8 - Released in 2016, can be used in a pistol and in a SBR configuration with an 8" medium taper profile barrel and a Krink muzzle device.
- CMMG Mk47 AKS13 - Released in 2016, has a 13" medium taper profile barrel and Krink muzzle device.

== Reception ==
The Mk47 underwent several tests in reliability, being manageable to handle, especially with a suppressor. Shooting Illustrated mentioned that the only thing the rifle needs is something to hold the bolt open so that the shooter or someone can see that the weapon is not loaded.
