= Weatherby =

American gun manufacturer

Weatherby, Inc.
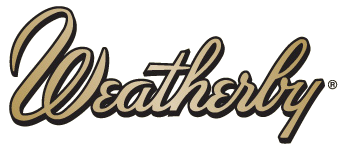
- Company type: Incorporated company
- Founded: 1945; 81 years ago
- Founder: Roy Weatherby
- Headquarters: Sheridan, Wyoming, United States
- Key people: Ed Weatherby; Adam Weatherby
- Products: Firearms; Ammunition; Shooting accessories
- Website: weatherby.com

Weatherby, Inc. is an American gun manufacturer founded in 1945 by Roy Weatherby. The company is best known for its high-powered magnum cartridges, such as the .257 Weatherby Magnum, .270 Weatherby Magnum, .300 Weatherby Magnum, .340 Weatherby Magnum and the .460 Weatherby Magnum. The company's headquarters is in Sheridan, Wyoming.

== History ==
The original production rifles by Roy Weatherby were built on commercial Mauser actions manufactured by FN, Brevex (magnum), and Mathieu (left hand). Weatherby would build a custom rifle from a customer's specifications for bespoke rifles, using any action the customer requested - provided the action was strong enough to tolerate the pressures for their desired cartridge. Weatherby manufactured his rifles for a number of years at his facility in South Gate, California, until 1956, when he contracted with Sako to continue building his firearms based on the Weatherby-FN Mauser actions. Weatherby still produced some custom rifles in South Gate following this contract.

Weatherby's first break from designs based on Mauser actions came in 1956 when he commissioned the Danish firm of Schultz & Larsen to build the 378 Weatherby Magnums utilizing the Schultz & Larsen Model 54 bolt-action. This action was stout and had several features that Weatherby would integrate into future proprietary rifle designs, including a low bolt-lift and triple gas-escape ports in the bolt.

In 1958, after several years of development, Roy Weatherby introduced the Mark V bolt action, his first proprietary design developed in-house by Weatherby himself and with his head engineer, Fred Jennie. Weatherby had to build the newly designed rifle to withstand the higher pressures the experimental cartridges produced, which exceeded 100,000 pounds per square inch [psi] (690,000 kPa). Pacific Founders, Inc. manufactured the first Weatherby Mark V actions in the United States. Weatherby assembled and finished the rifles at the Weatherby facility in South Gate. The demand for the new Mark V rifles quickly exceeded Weatherby's manufacturing capacity, so the company contracted with J. P. Sauer in West Germany to produce the rifles. Manufacturing of the Mark V continued in West Germany until the early 1970s, when material and labor costs led Weatherby to shift production to Howa in Japan. Some say the machining and finishing of the Howa manufactured Mark Vs was an improvement over that of the quality of the Sauer-made guns. Weatherby moved Mark V manufacturing back to the United States in 1995, where the Mark V has been built under contract by both Saco Defense (acquired by General Dynamics in 1998) and Acrometal/ATEK ever since.

The Mark V action remained relatively unchanged during its first five years of production until manufacturing moved from PFI in the United States to J. P. Sauer in Germany. The Sauer-produced version differed from that manufactured in the United States. Weatherby moved the safety from the receiver to the bolt and replaced the smooth surface of the safety found on the U.S.-made versions with a fluted surface. The first major change to the Mark V came in 1963 when Weatherby shortened and trimmed the design of the action around its 224 Weatherby Magnum varmint round, designed in 1964. The bolt in the smaller Mark V action had six locking lugs, as opposed to the nine locking lugs found on the parent rifle chambered in the 378 Weatherby Magnum. Rifles chambered for the new 224 Weatherby Magnum cartridge were dubbed the "Varmintmaster." Weatherby later offered the Varmintmaster chambered for the 22-250 Remington, making this the first non-Weatherby cartridge offered in the Mark V rifle. A version of the Mark V rifle equipped with a nine-lug bolt and chambered in .30-06 was also made available in 1967. The 30-06 and 22-250 cartridges remained the only two non-Weatherby chamberings offered in production Mark V rifles until the mid-1990s. However, Weatherby would still build a custom Mark V to a customer's specifications in virtually any caliber. Weatherby equipped all Mark V rifles made after 1967 that Weatherby chambered for non-Weatherby standard calibers (not magnum cartridges) with the six-lug version of the bolt; this made versions with a nine-lug bolt chambered in 30-06 (whether made in Germany or Japan) somewhat rare.

In the late 1960s, Weatherby contracted with Howa to build a Weatherby rifle that would be more affordable for the average hunter. The result was the Vanguard which Weatherby introduced in 1970, the same year that production of the Mark V moved to Japan. The Vanguard was based on the Howa 1500 bolt action and was initially only offered in standard calibers, and it provided an attractive alternative for buyers in the market for a sporting bolt-action rifle like the Winchester Model 70 or Remington Model 700. Weatherby has since offered the Vanguard chambered for select Weatherby magnum calibers.

In January 2018, the company announced it was relocating from Paso Robles, California to Sheridan, Wyoming.

== Products ==
=== Rifles ===
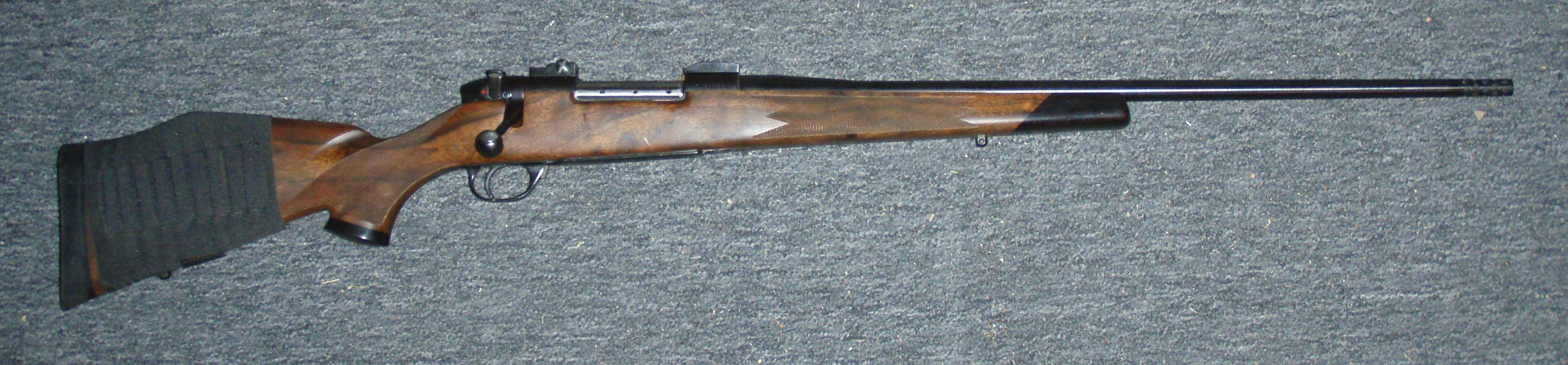
Weatherby Mark V in 7 mm Weatherby

Weatherby currently offers three lines of centerfire rifles: the Mark V, the Vanguard, and the Model 307. ATEK manufactures the Mark V barreled action in Brainerd, Minnesota; Howa still manufactures the barrel and action for the Vanguard. Weatherby performs the final assembly of the Mark V and Vanguard at its company headquarters in Sheridan, Wyoming. The Mark V has two action-size variants. Weatherby uses a larger nine-lug bolt-action for all larger Weatherby magnum calibers. Weatherby uses a smaller six-lug action (in two lengths) for the 240 Weatherby and all other non-Weatherby cartridges (as the 224 Weatherby Magnum is no longer a standard option). Both the Mark V and Vanguard are available as sub-MOA rifles which were replaced with "Range Certified" rifles in various models. These variants range from blued to stainless steel metal with kevlar or wooden stocks and are available in calibers, including the .223 Remington (Vanguard only) through to the .300 Weatherby Magnum. Rifles chambered in either the .340 Weatherby Magnum or the .460 Weatherby Magnum are only available on the Mark V as these cartridges require a stronger bolt.

In 2023, Weatherby began to produce a new model of rifle, the Model 307. The Model 307, positioned in price between the Vanguard and the Mark V, was designed to be compatible with the strong aftermarket for Remington 700 accessories. The name reflects the telephonic area code 307, which includes the current headquarters and factory in Sheridan, Wyoming. As with the Vanguard and Mark V models, the Model 307 is chambered for several currently-popular cartridges.

The Weatherby rifles come with a three-shot sub-MOA guarantee of accuracy from a cold bore on all models using Weatherby or premium ammunition. Generally regarded as of higher quality than Remington or Winchester rifles in the same class, Weatherby Mark V rifles are considerably more expensive in terms of unit cost and ammunition. However, Weatherby competitively prices the Vanguard models with other makes and models, while the Model 307 is somewhere in between the aforementioned two models.

=== Scopes ===
Weatherby no longer manufactures rifle scopes or other optical products. The company produced a Mark XXI Scope between 1964 and 1989. The company offered the Sightmaster Spotting Scope with magnification ranges of 20x-45x from 1972 to 1982 and 20x-60x from 1983 to 1989. Earlier optics also included the Imperial Scope and were produced for Weatherby by Hertel & Reuss and manufactured in West Germany between 1964 and 1973. Weatherby manufactured its Premier Scopes from 1973 to 1982 and its Supreme Scopes from 1983 to 1994.

=== Shotguns ===
Weatherby offers a line of shotguns for bird hunting and skeet shooting. Weatherby produces four types of shotguns, each type available in two different models: over-under double barrel, side-by-side double barrel, pump-action, and semi-automatic. Weatherby's shotguns (the "D'Italia" line) are made in Italy through a collaborative effort with Italian gunmaker Fausti Arms.

=== Cartridges ===
Firearms designer and cartridge pioneer Charles Newton, often colloquially referred to as the "Father of High Velocity", was the first to build a hunting cartridge and rifle capable of firing a bullet at over 3,000 feet per second (910 m/s). Weatherby developed its rifles following this new trend in designing high-velocity hunting calibers. In the late 1980s, Remington's Ultra Mag series of unbelted magnum cartridges - returning to the Newton-style cartridge design - provided Weatherby with new competition. However, Weatherby still makes the most powerful commercially available hunting cartridge in the world with its .460 Weatherby.

Weatherby has designed almost all of its cartridges with belts; curved, double-radius shoulders; and considerable freebore. The .224 Weatherby Magnum, introduced in 1963, was the first and, for more than 50 years, the only Weatherby cartridge to have an angled shoulder but included the company's other distinctive features. The first major departure from the classic Weatherby design was the 6.5 Weatherby Rebated Precision Magnum (often abbreviated as RPM), a non-belted cartridge with an angled shoulder and no freebore introduced in 2019. In 2022, a second cartridge in the RPM family, the .338 Weatherby RPM, was introduced, again with no belt and an angled shoulder.

According to Weatherby's website, the company's full lineup of cartridges consists of the:

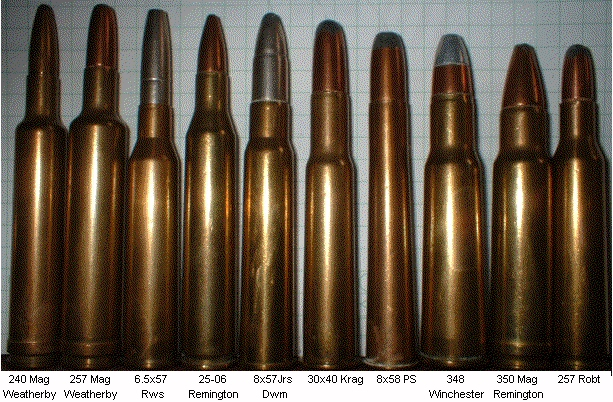

- .224 Weatherby Magnum
- .240 Weatherby Magnum
- .257 Weatherby Magnum
- 6.5 RPM (Rebated Precision Magnum)
- 6.5-300 Weatherby Magnum
- .270 Weatherby Magnum
- 7mm Weatherby Magnum
- .300 Weatherby Magnum
- .338 Weatherby RPM
- .340 Weatherby Magnum
- .30-378 Weatherby Magnum
- .338-378 Weatherby Magnum
- .375 Weatherby Magnum
- .378 Weatherby Magnum
- .416 Weatherby Magnum
- .460 Weatherby Magnum

Weatherby also produced the .220 Weatherby Rocket cartridge, designed by Roy Weatherby. It does not have the typical double-radius shoulder like almost all other Weatherby cartridges, and it is not a belted magnum. Weatherby described it as an "improved" version of the .220 Swift.

Some Weatherby cartridges (circle size proportional to recoil)
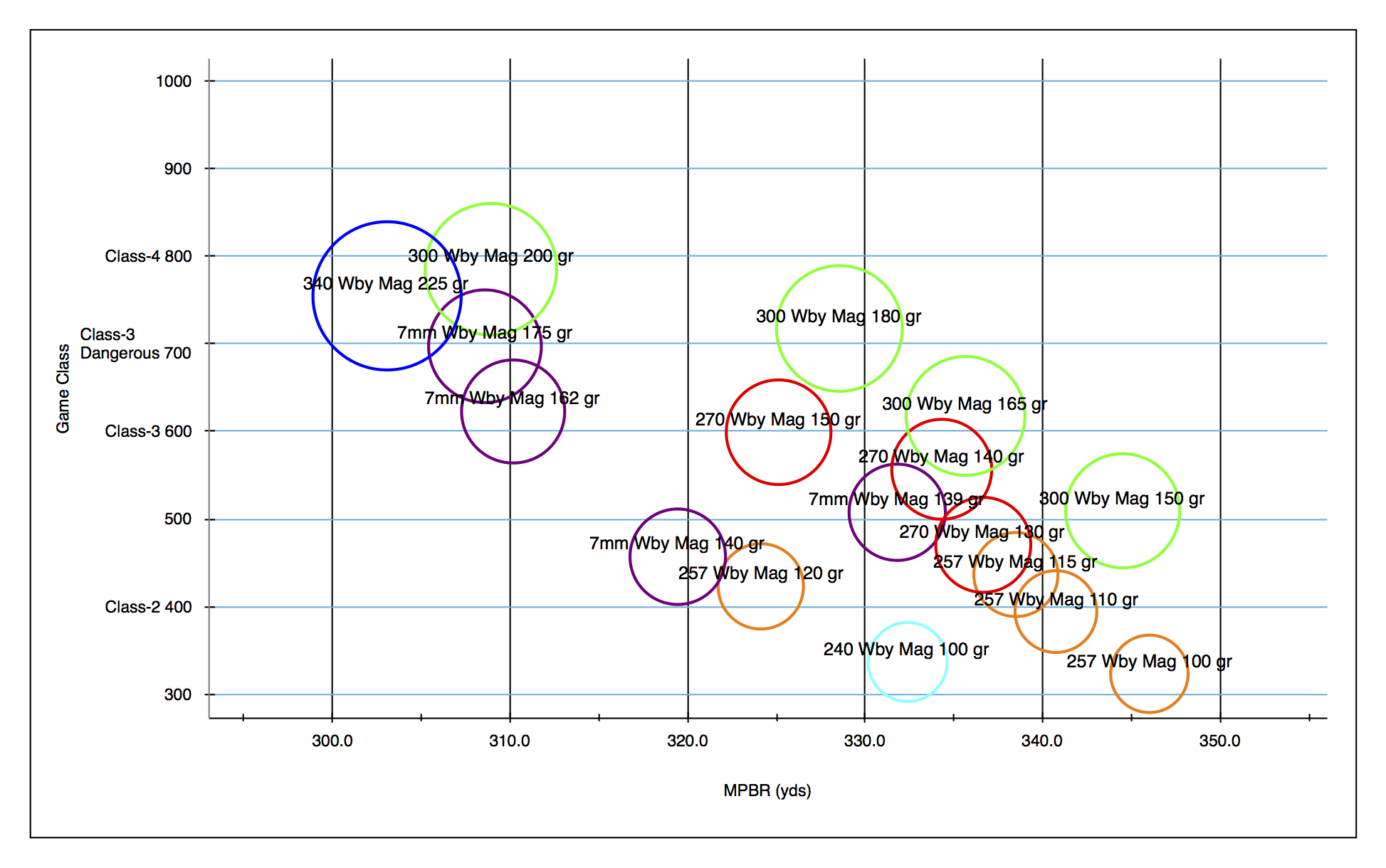
Game class vs. 6-inch maximum point blank range

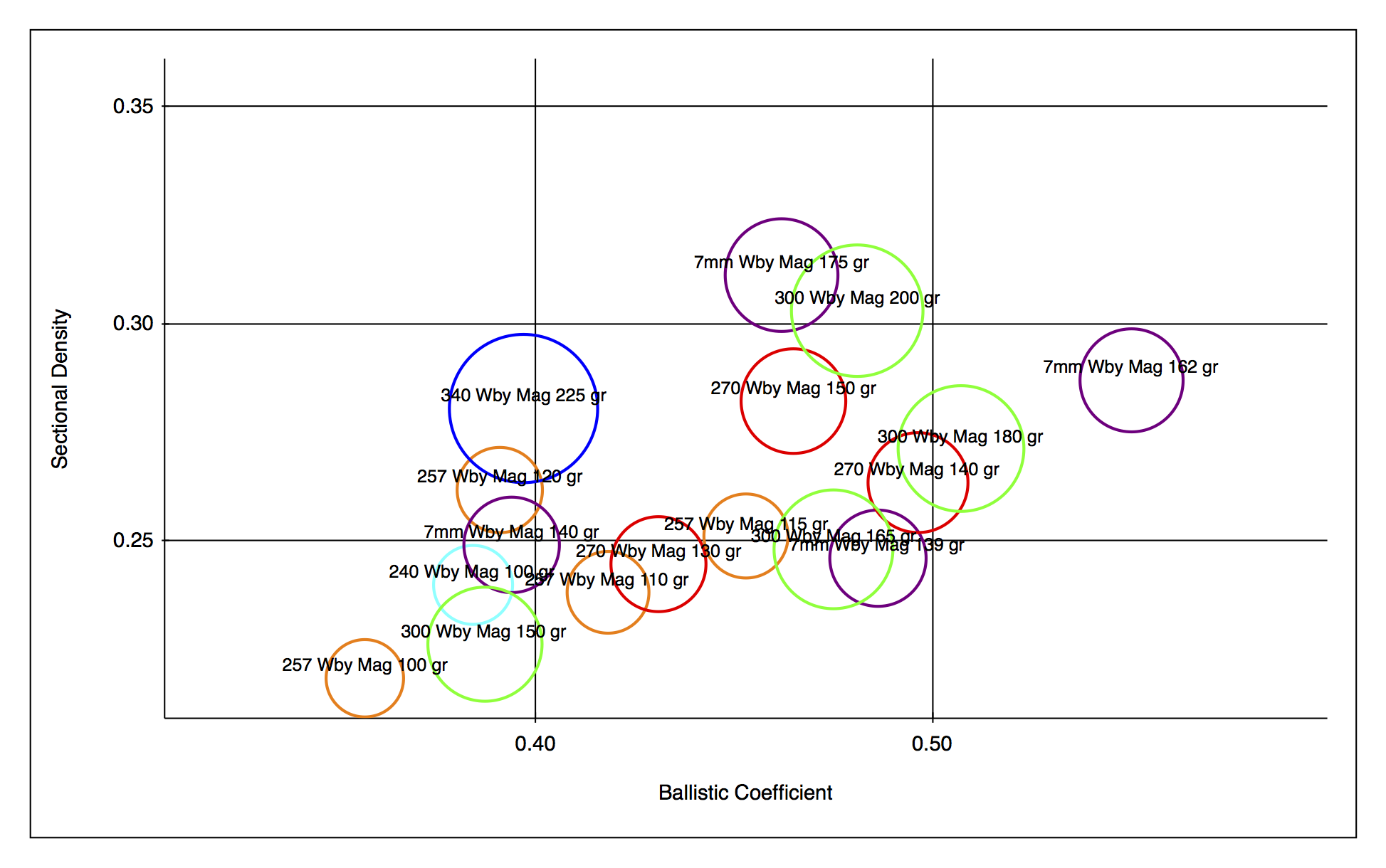
Sectional density vs. ballistic coefficient

Currently, Weatherby offers rifles chambered in the following standard non-Weatherby cartridges:

- .223 Remington
- .22-250 Remington
- .243 Winchester
- .25-06 Remington
- 6.5mm Creedmoor
- 6.5mm PRC
- .270 Winchester
- 7mm Backcountry
- 7mm PRC
- 7mm-08 Remington
- .280 Remington AI
- 7mm Rem Mag
- .308 Winchester
- .30-06 Springfield
- .300 PRC
- .300 Winchester Magnum
- .350 Legend

Weatherby shotguns are available in several common cartridges from the .410 bore up to the 12 gauge.

== References in Popular Culture ==
"Weatherby" is mentioned in "Yvette" by Jason Isbell on the Southeastern album.

== See also ==
- Weatherby Hunting and Conservation Award
