= Howa =

Japanese machinery and firearms manufacturing company

Howa Machinery, Ltd.
- Native name: 豊和工業株式会社
- Company type: Public (K.K)
- Traded as: TYO: 6203; NAG: 6203
- ISIN: JP3840600005
- Industry: Machinery
- Founded: February 9, 1907; 119 years ago
- Headquarters: Kiyosu, Aichi Prefecture 452-8601, Japan
- Key people: Takahiro Tsukamoto (President)
- Products: Machine tools; Firearms; Construction equipment
- Revenue: ▲JPY 22.3 billion (FY 2018) (US$ 202 million)
- Net income: ▲JPY 1.1 billion (FY 2018) (US$ 10 million)
- Number of employees: 849 (consolidated, as of March 31, 2019)
- Website: www.howa.co.jp

Howa Machinery, Ltd. (豊和工業株式会社, Hōwa Kōgyō Kabushiki-gaisha) (/ˈhoʊwɑː/ HO-wah) is a Japanese machinery manufacturer known internationally for their production of military and civilian firearms. They also manufacture products such as machine tools, sweeping vehicles, windows and doors.

== History ==
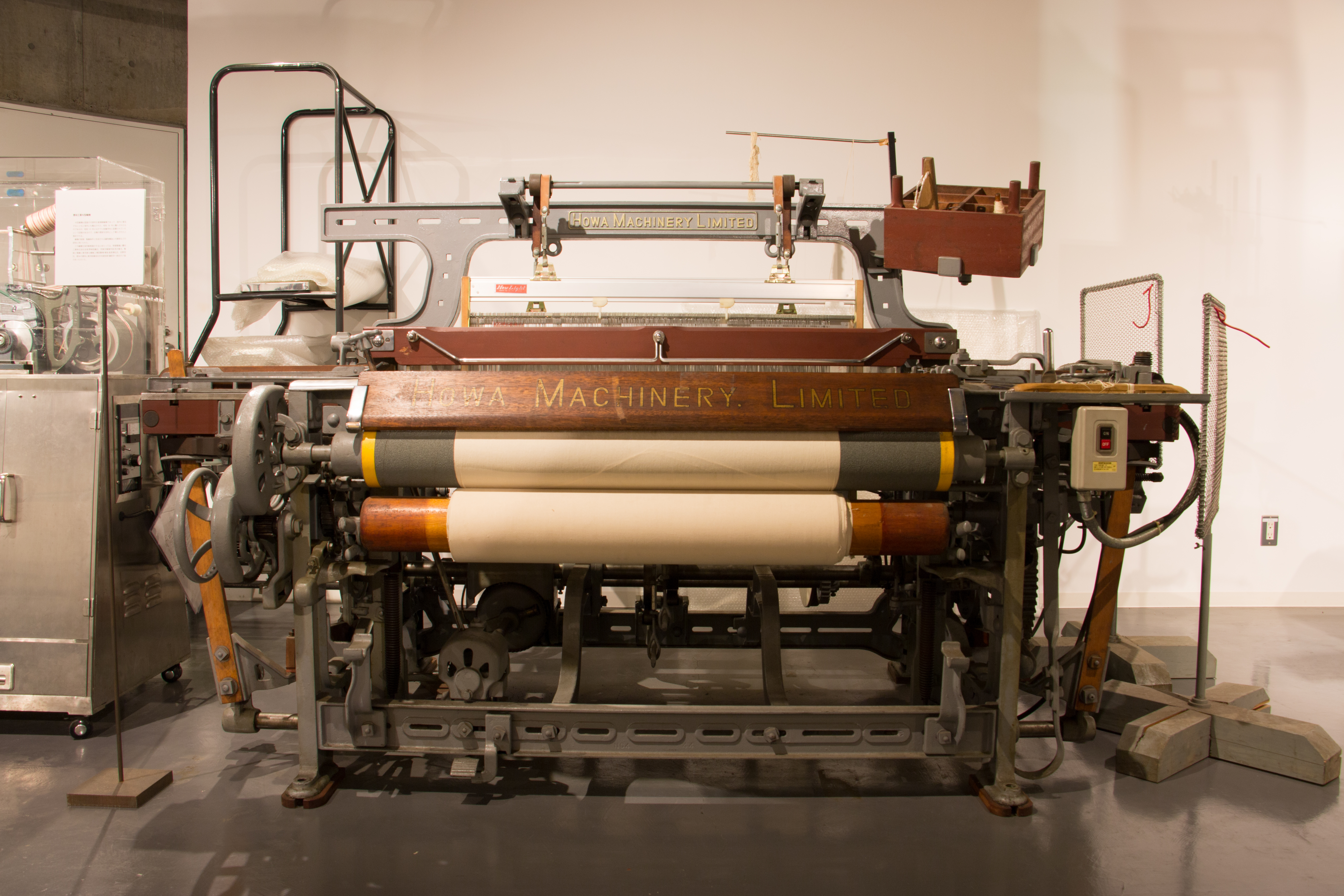
Howa N-Type power loom on display at the Tokyo Institute of Technology

Toyoda's Loom Works, Ltd. (豊田式織機株式会社) was established by Sakichi Toyoda in February 1907. In 1941, Toyoda's Loom Works merged with Showa Heavy Industries (昭和重工業株式会社; established in 1936 to produce rifles, artillery shells and airplane parts) and was renamed Howa Heavy Industries, Ltd. (豊和重工業株式会社). The company was renamed to its current name at the end of World War II and restarted manufacturing textile machinery.

=== Weapon manufacturing ===
==== Military use ====
Toyoda's Loom Works began manufacturing armaments in 1932.

===== During World War II =====
Since 1940, Howa has been heavily involved in the Japanese armaments industry, and was involved in manufacturing the famous Arisaka rifle series including Type 99 rifle, parts of Type 38 rifle, artillery pieces, airplane parts, and ammunition. Many of their World War II-era weapons are highly sought after collector's items.

===== Post WWII =====
Howa created copies of the US M1 Garand and the M1 carbine for the Japanese Self Defense Forces during the early days of the Cold War.

Howa also designed and manufactured firearms for JGSDF use, including the following types (models):

- Howa Type 64
- Howa Type 89
- AR-18 (licensed production for Armalite Inc.)
- Howa Type HR-13
- Howa Type 96
- Howa Type 20
- Howa 84mm Recoilless Rifle (licensed copy of the Swedish Carl Gustaf 84 mm Recoilless Rifle)
- 12.7mm Spotting rifle mount for Type 60 recoilless rifles.
- Mortar mount for Type 96 mortar carrier

During the early 1970s, Howa produced the AR-18 and AR-180 5.56mm assault rifle as a license from Armalite Inc. of Costa Mesa, California, which marketed the rifle to various military forces. Japanese government restrictions on the sales of military small arms to foreign countries eventually forced Howa to cease production of the AR-18/AR-180, moving production back to Armalite.

==== Civilian use ====
Howa has produced a long line of civilian hunting and target practice rifles in a range of calibers. Howa has also manufactured products or components for other firearm companies, such as Mossberg, Smith & Wesson, and Weatherby. The Smith & Wesson Model 1000 shotgun of the 1970s and 1980s was designed and manufactured by Howa.

- Howa M300: Based on the M1 / M2 carbine military automatic rifle designed in the United States, it was developed for hunting and sports. Produced between 1960-1996.
- Howa Golden Bear: A bolt-action rifle that was once manufactured by Howa Industries between 1967-1979.
- Howa M1500: A bolt-action rifle, is produced in sporting, varmint and heavy barrel configurations, which are sold in the U.S. via Legacy Sports International. In Canada, various retailers stock Howa rifles, including Prophet River, Cabela's, and North Pro Sports. In the United Kingdom, Highland Outdoors imports the Howa rifles.
