= .22-250 Remington =

Rifle cartridge

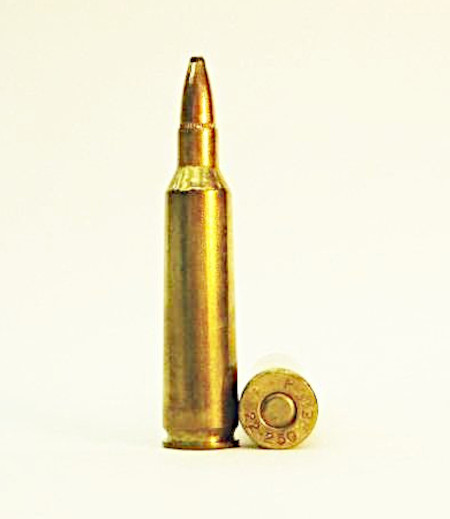
- Type: Rifle
- Place of origin: US

Production history
- Designer: Grosvenor Wotkyns, J.E Gebby & J. Bushnell Smith
- Designed: 1937
- Manufacturer: Remington
- Produced: 1965–present
- Variants: .22-250 Ackley Improved

Specifications
- Parent case: .250-3000 Savage
- Case type: Rimless, bottleneck
- Bullet diameter: .224 in (5.7 mm)
- Neck diameter: .254 in (6.5 mm)
- Shoulder diameter: .414 in (10.5 mm)
- Base diameter: .470 in (11.9 mm)
- Rim diameter: .473 in (12.0 mm)
- Case length: 1.912 in (48.6 mm)
- Overall length: 2.35 in (60 mm)
- Rifling twist: 1-12, 1-14
- Primer type: Large rifle
- Maximum pressure: 65,000 psi (450 MPa)

Ballistic performance
| Bullet mass/type | Velocity | Energy |
|---|---|---|
| 40 gr. (2.6g) BT | 4,224 ft/s (1,287 m/s) | 1,585 ft⋅lbf (2,149 J) |
| 50 gr. (3.2g) SP | 3,945 ft/s (1,202 m/s) | 1,728 ft⋅lbf (2,343 J) |
| 55 gr. (3.6g) SP | 3,786 ft/s (1,154 m/s) | 1,751 ft⋅lbf (2,374 J) |
| 60 gr. (3.9g) BT | 3,580 ft/s (1,090 m/s) | 1,708 ft⋅lbf (2,316 J) |
| 64 gr. (4.1g) Power Point | 3,500 ft/s (1,100 m/s) | 1,741 ft⋅lbf (2,360 J) |

.22-250 Remington maximum C.I.P. cartridge dimensions. All sizes in millimeters (mm) / Imperial (inches).

The .22-250 Remington / 5.7x48mm is a very high-velocity, short action, .22 caliber rifle cartridge primarily used for varmint hunting and small game hunting. It is capable of reaching over 4,000 feet per second. This cartridge is also sometimes known as the .22 Varminter or the .22 Wotkyns Original Swift. Along with the .220 Swift, the .22-250 was one of the high-velocity .22 caliber cartridges that developed a reputation for remote wounding effects known as hydrostatic shock in the late 1930s and early 1940s.

== History ==
The .22-250 started life as a wildcat cartridge developed from the .250-3000 Savage case necked down to take a .224 caliber bullet. In the early days of cartridges there were several different versions that varied only slightly from one to the next, including one developed in 1937 by Grosvenor Wotkyns, J. E. Gebby and J. B. Smith who named their version the 22 Varminter.

The .22-250 is similar to, but was outperformed by, the larger .220 Swift cartridge. However, it is in much wider use and has a larger variety of commercially available factory ammunition than the Swift, making it generally cheaper to shoot. The smaller powder load also contributes to more economical shooting for users who load their own ammunition. Due to its rimless case the 22-250 also feeds from a box magazine more reliably than the Swift, a semi-rimmed cartridge susceptible to rim lock.

In 1937 Phil Sharpe, one of the first gunsmiths to build a rifle for the .22-250 and long-time .220 Swift rifle builder, stated, "The Swift performed best when it was loaded to approximately full velocity," whereas, "The Varminter case permits the most flexible loading ever recorded with a single cartridge. It will handle all velocities from 1,500 ft/s up to 4,500 ft/s."

Sharpe credited the steep 28-degree shoulder for this performance. He insisted that it kept the powder burning in the case rather than in the throat of the rifle, as well as prevented case stretching and neck thickening. "Shoulder angle ranks along with primer, powders, bullets, neck length, body taper, loading density and all those other features," he wrote. "The .22 Varminter seems to have a perfectly balanced combination of all desirable features and is not just an old cartridge pepped up with new powders."

Accuracy was consistently excellent, with little need for either case trimming or neck reaming, and Sharpe pronounced it "my choice for the outstanding cartridge development of the past decade." He finished by saying he looked forward to the day when it would become a commercial cartridge.

== Commercial acceptance ==
In 1963, the Browning Arms Company started to chamber its Browning High Power rifle in .22-250, at the time a wildcat cartridge. This was a historic move on Browning's part as there was no commercial production of the .22-250 at the time. John T. Amber, reporting on the development of the Browning rifle in the 1964 Gun Digest, called the event "unprecedented". "As far as I know", he wrote, "this is the first time a first-line arms-maker has offered a rifle chambered for a cartridge that it—or some other production ammunition maker—cannot supply". Amber foresaw difficulties for the company but "applauded Browning's courage in taking this step". He said he had his order in for one of the first heavy-barrel models, expected in June 1963, and added, "I can hardly wait."

Two years later, in 1965, Remington Arms adopted the .22-250, added "Remington" to the name and chambered their Model 700 and 40 XB match rifles for the cartridge along with a line of commercial ammunition, thus establishing its commercial specification.

The .22-250 was the first non-Weatherby caliber offered in the unique Weatherby Mark V rifle.

== Military acceptance ==
Both the British Special Air Service and the Australian Special Air Service Regiment used Tikka M55 sniper rifles chambered in .22-250 for urban counter-terrorism duties in the 1980s, in an attempt to reduce excessive penetration and ricochets.

== Platforms ==
| Manufacturer | Model | Type | Country |
|---|---|---|---|
| Chattahoochee Munitions | CM10 | Semi-automatic rifle | United States |

== Performance ==
Typical factory-loaded .22-250 Remington can propel a 55 grain (3.56 g) spitzer bullet at 3,680 ft/s (1122 m/s) with 1,654 ft⋅lbf (2,243 J) of energy. Many other loads with lighter bullets are used to achieve velocities of over 4,000 ft/s (1,219 m/s), while still having effective energy for use in hunting small game and medium-sized predators. CIP lists the performance as: Transducer method pressures (energies): max average Pmax = 4,050 bar, PE (proof pressure) = 5,060 bar, EE (Min proof energy) = 2,370 joules

It is particularly popular in the western states of the US, where high winds often hinder the effectiveness of other varmint rounds in prairie dog hunting. Many states in the US have minimum-caliber restrictions on larger game such as deer, although the majority of states allow the .22 centerfire cartridges to be used for big game. In other countries such as Australia and New Zealand the cartridge is often used on kangaroos, fallow deer and other medium sized animals.

== See also ==
- 5 mm caliber
- Delta L problem
- List of rifle cartridges
- Table of handgun and rifle cartridges
