= European Cartridge Research Association =

Non-profit organisation

European Cartridge Research Association (ECRA) is a nonprofit organization which aims to promote interest and knowledge about ammunition of all types and forms. The organization was founded in 1965 under the name European Cartridge Collectors Club by the Belgian Emile Timmermans, and later changed name to the European Cartridge Research Association. While ECRA consists of European member associations, it also has individual members from outside Europe.

== History ==
The founder of ECRA, Emile Timmermans, had started collecting in 1945, and in 1964 wrote a letter to 10 other collectors in Germany, England, France and Switzerland where he described his ideas, whereupon he received 20 enthusiastic answers. On 1 January 1965, the first edition of the bulletin The Cartridge Researcher was published, written by Emile Timmermans. The Bulletinen has always been published with English as its main language, but has also been translated. Today there are five language groups within ECRA, which covers English, French, Spanish, German and Dutch. The Cartridge Researcher bulletin is published monthly.

On 20 September 1980, Norwegian and Swedish cartridge collectors met in the town of Grums in Sweden and agreed that a Scandinavian organization should be to established. This led to the Scandinavian Ammunition Research Association (SARA) which was formally founded on 22 August 1981 in the city of Arvika in Sweden. SARA today has increased its activity to also include collectors from Denmark, Finland and Iceland, and as such acts as the Nordic branch of ECRA.

Independently from ECRA, the U.S. based International Ammunition Association (IAA) was founded in 1955.

== Resources ==
ECRA edits the ECRA Caliber Data Viewer (ECDV) which is regarded as one of the most important cartridge identification databases in the world, with more than 15000 registered small caliber cartridges up to 50 mm.

== Member associations ==
- Argentinian Collectors Association
- Czech and Slovak Ammunition Collectors Association
- Dutch Association for Research of Ammunition and Ballistics
- German Research Association for Ammunition
- Italian Cartridge Collectors Association
- New Zealand Cartridge Collectors Club
- Scandinavian Ammunition Research Association is the Nordic branch of ECRA, and represents collectors from Norway, Denmark, Sweden, Finland and Iceland. SARA publishes a member magazine called the Bulletin.
- Portuguese Collectors Association
- Southern Africa Arms and Ammunition Collectors Association
- Spanish Cartridge Collectors Association
- Swiss subdivision of the German Research Association for Ammunition

== See also ==
- International Cartridge Collectors Association
- Air travel with firearms and ammunition
- CIP, a European standardization organization for firearm cartridges
- SAAMI, an American standardization organization for firearm cartridges
