= Ammunition =

Material fired, scattered, dropped, or detonated from a weapon or weapon system

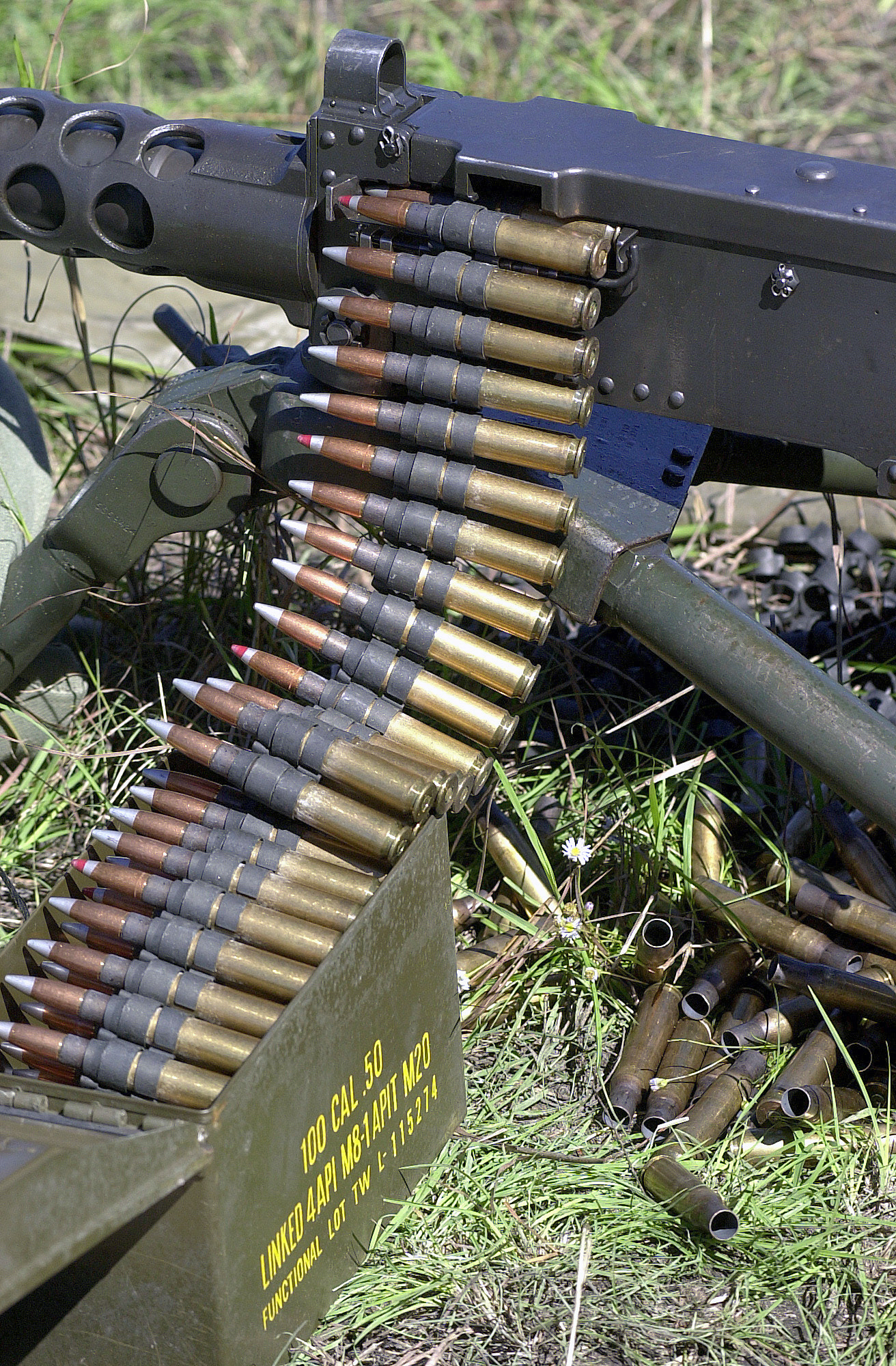
A belt of 0.50 caliber ammunition loaded into an M2 Browning. Every fifth round (red tip) is an M20 (armor piercing incendiary tracer).

Ammunition, also known as ammo, is the material fired, scattered, dropped, or detonated from any weapon or weapon system. The term Ammunition includes both expendable weapons (e.g., bombs, missiles, grenades, land mines), and the parts of other weapons that create the effect on a target (e.g., bullets and warheads).

The purpose of ammunition is to project a force against a selected target to have an effect (usually, but not always, lethal). An example of ammunition is the firearm cartridge, which includes all components required to deliver the weapon's effect in a single package. Until the 20th century, black powder was the most common propellant used, but it has now been replaced in nearly all cases by modern compounds.

Ammunition comes in a wide range of sizes and types and is often designed to work only with specific weapon systems. However, there are internationally recognized standards for certain ammunition types (e.g., 5.56×45mm NATO) that enable their use across different weapons and by different users. There are also specific types of ammunition that are designed to have a specialized effect on a target, such as armor-piercing shells and tracer ammunition, used only in certain circumstances. Ammunition is commonly labeled or colored in a specific manner to assist in its identification and to prevent the wrong ammunition types from being used accidentally or inappropriately.

== Glossary ==
- A round is a single cartridge containing a projectile, propellant, primer and casing.
- A shell is a form of ammunition that is fired by a large caliber cannon or artillery piece. Before the mid-19th century, these shells were usually solid and relied on kinetic energy for effectiveness. However, since that time, they are more often filled with high explosives (see artillery).
- A shot is a single release of a weapons system. This may involve firing just one round or piece of ammunition (e.g., from a semi-automatic firearm), but can also refer to ammunition types that release a large number of projectiles at the same time (e.g., cluster munitions or shotgun shells).
- A dud is loaded ammunition that fails to function as intended, typically failing to detonate on landing. However, it can also refer to ammunition that fails to fire inside the weapon (a misfire) or to ammunition that only partially functions (a hang fire). Dud ammunition, which is classified as an unexploded ordnance (UXO), is regarded as highly dangerous. In former conflict zones, it is common for dud ammunition to remain buried in the ground for many years. Large quantities of ammunition from World War I continue to be regularly found in fields throughout France and Belgium, and occasionally still claim lives. Although classified as UXO, landmines left behind after conflict are not considered duds, as they have not failed to function and may still be fully operational.
- A bomb or, more specifically, a guided or unguided bomb (also called an aircraft bomb or aerial bomb), is typically an airdropped, unpowered explosive weapon. Mines and the warheads used in guided missiles and rockets are also referred to as bomb-type ammunition.

== Etymology ==
The term ammunition dates back to the mid-17th century. The word comes from the French la munition, for the material used for war. Ammunition and munition are often used interchangeably, although munition now usually refers to the actual weapons system with the ammunition required to operate it. In some languages other than English ammunition is still referred to as munition, such as: Dutch ("munitie"), French ("munitions"), German ("Munition"), Italian ("munizione") and Portuguese ("munição").

== Design ==
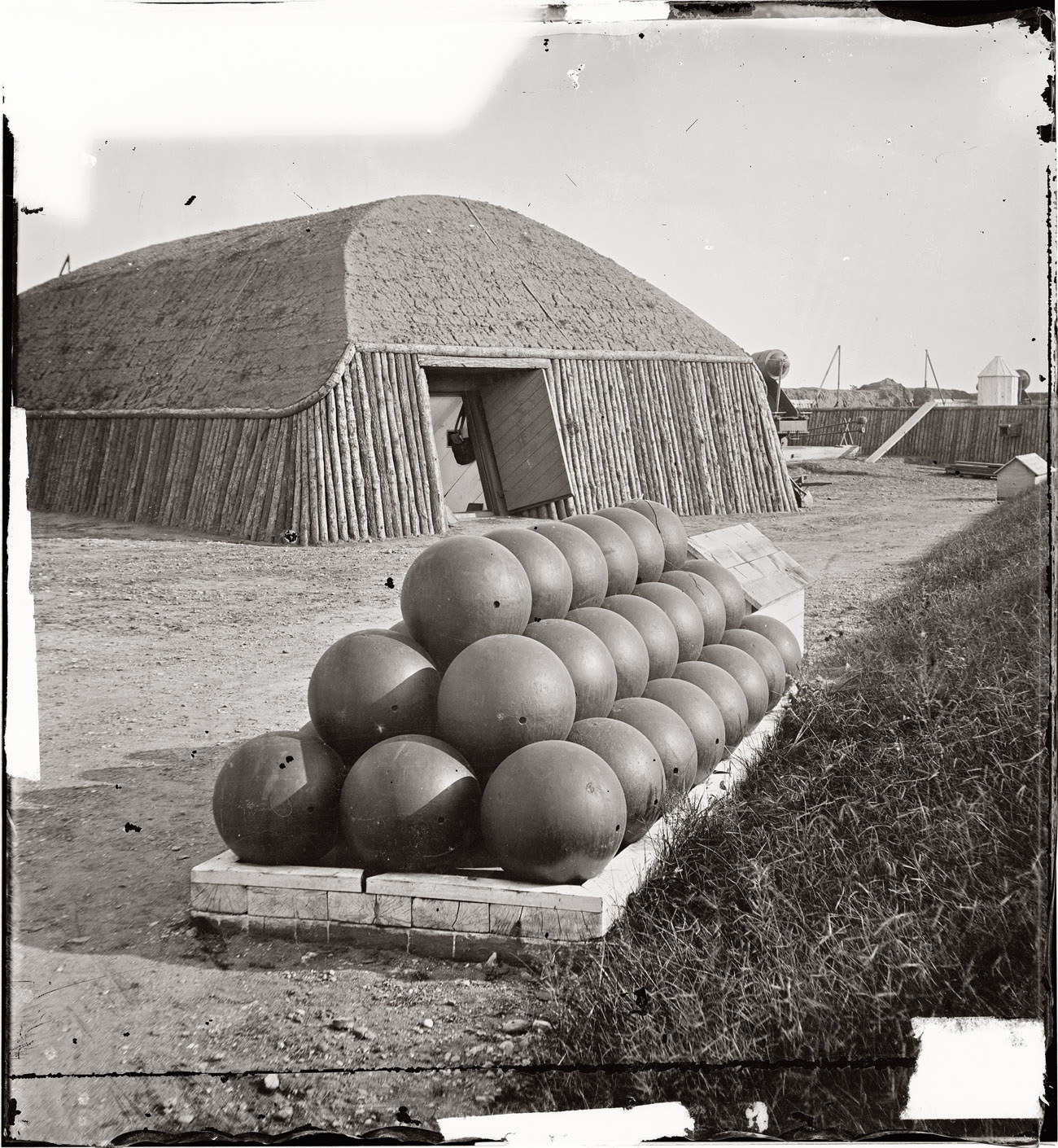
Cannonballs from the American Civil War

Ammunition design has evolved throughout history as different weapons have been developed and different effects required. Historically, ammunition was of relatively simple design and build (e.g., sling-shot, stones hurled by catapults), but as weapon designs developed (e.g., rifling) and became more refined, the need for more specialized ammunition increased. Modern ammunition can vary significantly in quality but is usually manufactured to very high standards.

For example, ammunition for hunting can be designed to expand inside a target, maximising the damage inflicted by one round. Anti-personnel shells are designed to fragment into many pieces and can affect a large area. Armor-piercing rounds are specially hardened to penetrate armor, while smoke ammunition creates a fog that screens people from view. More generic ammunition (e.g., 5.56×45mm NATO) can often be modified slightly to achieve a more specific effect (e.g., tracer, incendiary), whilst larger explosive rounds can be altered by using different fuzes.

== Components ==
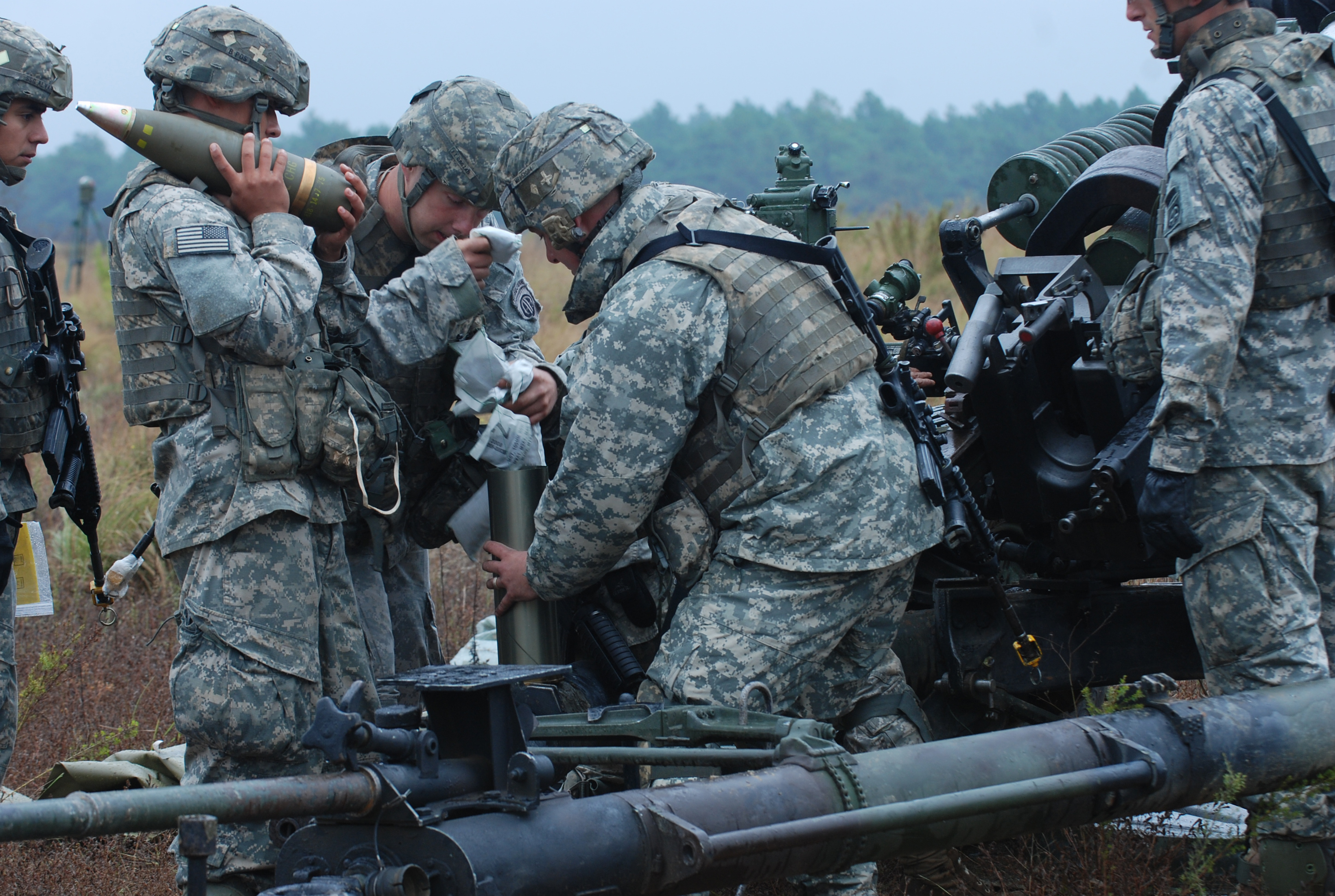
Preparing 105 mm M119 howitzer ammunition: powder propellant, cartridge, and shell with fuze

The components of ammunition intended for rifles and munitions may be divided into these categories:

- fuze or primer
- explosive materials and propellants
- projectiles of all kinds
- cartridge casing

=== Fuzes ===
The term fuze refers to the detonator of an explosive round or shell. The spelling is different in British English and American English (fuse/fuze respectively), and they are unrelated to a fuse (electrical). A fuse was earlier used to ignite the propellant (e.g., such as on a firework) until the advent of more reliable systems, such as the primer or igniter that is used in most modern ammunition.

The fuze of a weapon can be used to alter how the ammunition works. For example, a common artillery shell fuze can be set to "point detonation" (detonation when it hits a target), delay (detonate after it has hit and penetrated a target), time-delay (explode a specified time after firing or impact) and proximity (explode above or next to a target without hitting it, such as for airburst effects or anti-aircraft shells). These allow a single ammunition type to be altered to suit the situation it is required for. There are many fuze designs, ranging from simple mechanical to complex radar- and barometric-based systems.

Fuzes are typically armed by the acceleration force of firing the projectile and are armed several meters after clearing the weapon's bore. This helps to ensure the ammunition is safer to handle when loading into the weapon and reduces the chance of the detonator firing before the ammunition has cleared the weapon.

=== Propellant or explosive ===
The propellant is the component of ammunition that is activated inside the weapon and provides the kinetic energy required to move the projectile from the weapon to the target. Before the use of gunpowder, this energy would have been produced mechanically by the weapons system (e.g., a catapult or crossbow); in modern times, it is usually a form of chemical energy that rapidly burns to create kinetic force, and an appropriate amount of chemical propellant is packaged with each round of ammunition. In recent years, compressed gas, magnetic energy, and electrical energy have been used as propellants.

Until the 20th century, gunpowder was the most common propellant in ammunition. However, it has since been replaced by a wide range of fast-burning compounds that are more reliable and efficient.

The propellant charge is distinct from the projectile charge, which is activated by the fuze, which causes the ammunition effect (e.g., the exploding of an artillery round).

=== Cartridge case or container ===
Ordnance workers inspecting cartridge cases in Los Angeles, 1943

The cartridge is the container that holds the projectile and propellant. Not all ammunition types have a cartridge case. In its place, a wide range of materials can be used to contain the explosives and parts. With some large weapons, the ammunition components are stored separately until loaded into the weapon system for firing. With small arms, caseless ammunition can reduce the weight and cost of ammunition and simplify the firing process, increasing the firing rate, but the technology is still maturing and has functional issues.

=== Projectile ===
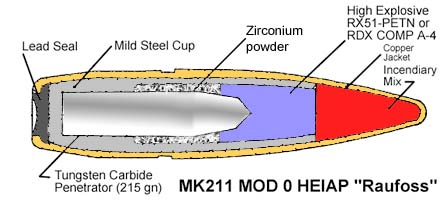
The inside of a modern 12.7 mm "anti-materiel" rifle bullet

The projectile is the part of the ammunition that leaves the weapon and affects the target. This effect is usually either kinetic (e.g., as with a standard bullet) or explosive.

== Storage ==
An ammunition dump is a military facility for storing live ammunition and explosives to be distributed and used at a later date. Such a storage facility is extremely hazardous, with a high risk of accidents during unloading, packing, and transferring the ammunition. In the event of a fire or explosion, the site and its surrounding area are immediately evacuated, and the stored ammunition is left to detonate completely, with limited firefighting attempts from a safe distance. In large facilities, there may be a flooding system to extinguish a fire or prevent an explosion automatically. Typically, an ammunition dump will have a large buffer zone surrounding it to avoid casualties in the event of an accident. There will also be perimeter security measures in place to prevent unauthorised personnel from accessing the area and to guard against potential threats from enemy forces.

A magazine is a place where a quantity of ammunition or other explosive material is stored temporarily before being used. The term may be used for a facility that stores large quantities of ammunition, although this is normally referred to as an ammunition dump. Magazines are typically located in the field for quick access when engaging the enemy. The ammunition storage area on a warship is referred to as the "ship's magazine". On a smaller scale, magazine is also the name given to the ammunition storage and feeding device of a repeating firearm.

Gunpowder must be stored in a dry place (stable room temperature) to keep it usable for at least 10 years. It is also recommended to avoid hot places, because friction or heat might ignite a spark and cause an explosion.

== Common types ==
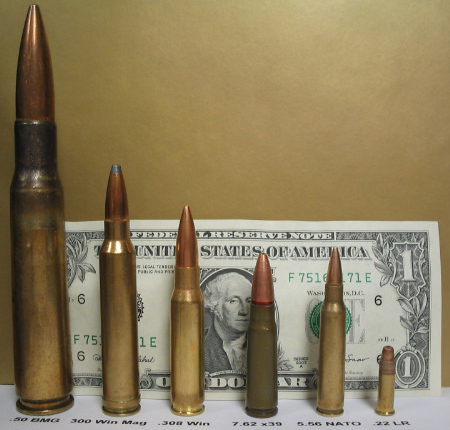
Various rifle cartridges compared to the height of a US$1 bill.

=== Small arms ===
The standard weapon of a modern soldier is an assault rifle, which, like other small arms, uses cartridge ammunition sized for the weapon. Ammunition is carried on the person in box magazines specific to the weapon, ammunition boxes, pouches, or bandoliers. The amount of ammunition carried depends on the soldier's strength, the expected action required, and the ammunition's ability to move through the logistical chain to replenish the supply. A soldier may also carry a smaller amount of specialised ammunition for heavier weapons, such as machine guns and mortars, thereby spreading the burden of squad weapons among many people. Too little ammunition threatens the mission, while too much limits the soldier's mobility and also threatens the mission.

=== Shells ===
A shell is a payload-carrying projectile which, as opposed to a shot, contains explosives or other fillings, in use since the 19th century.

==== Artillery ====
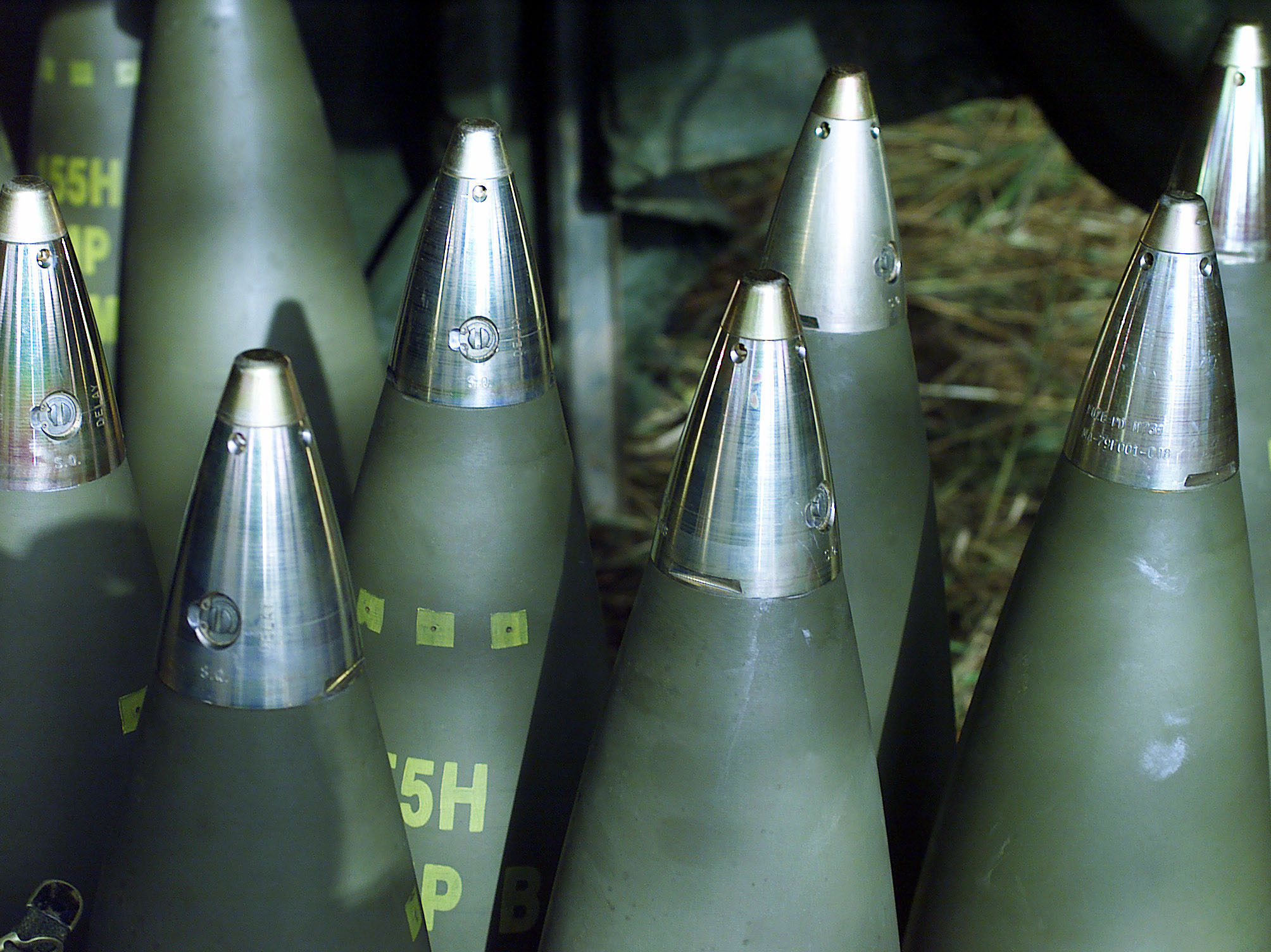
M107 shells

Artillery shells are ammunition that is designed to be fired from artillery, which has an effect over long distances, usually indirectly (i.e., out of sight of the target). There are many different types of artillery ammunition, but they are usually high-explosive and designed to shatter into fragments on impact to maximize damage. The fuze on an artillery shell can alter how it explodes or behaves, giving it a more specialized effect. Common types of artillery ammunition include high explosive, smoke, illumination, and practice rounds. Some artillery rounds are designed as cluster munitions. Artillery ammunition will almost always include a projectile (the only exception being demonstration or blank rounds), fuze, and propellant of some form. When a cartridge case is not used, another method of containing the propellant bags is used, usually in a breech-loading weapon; see Breechloader.

==== Tank ====
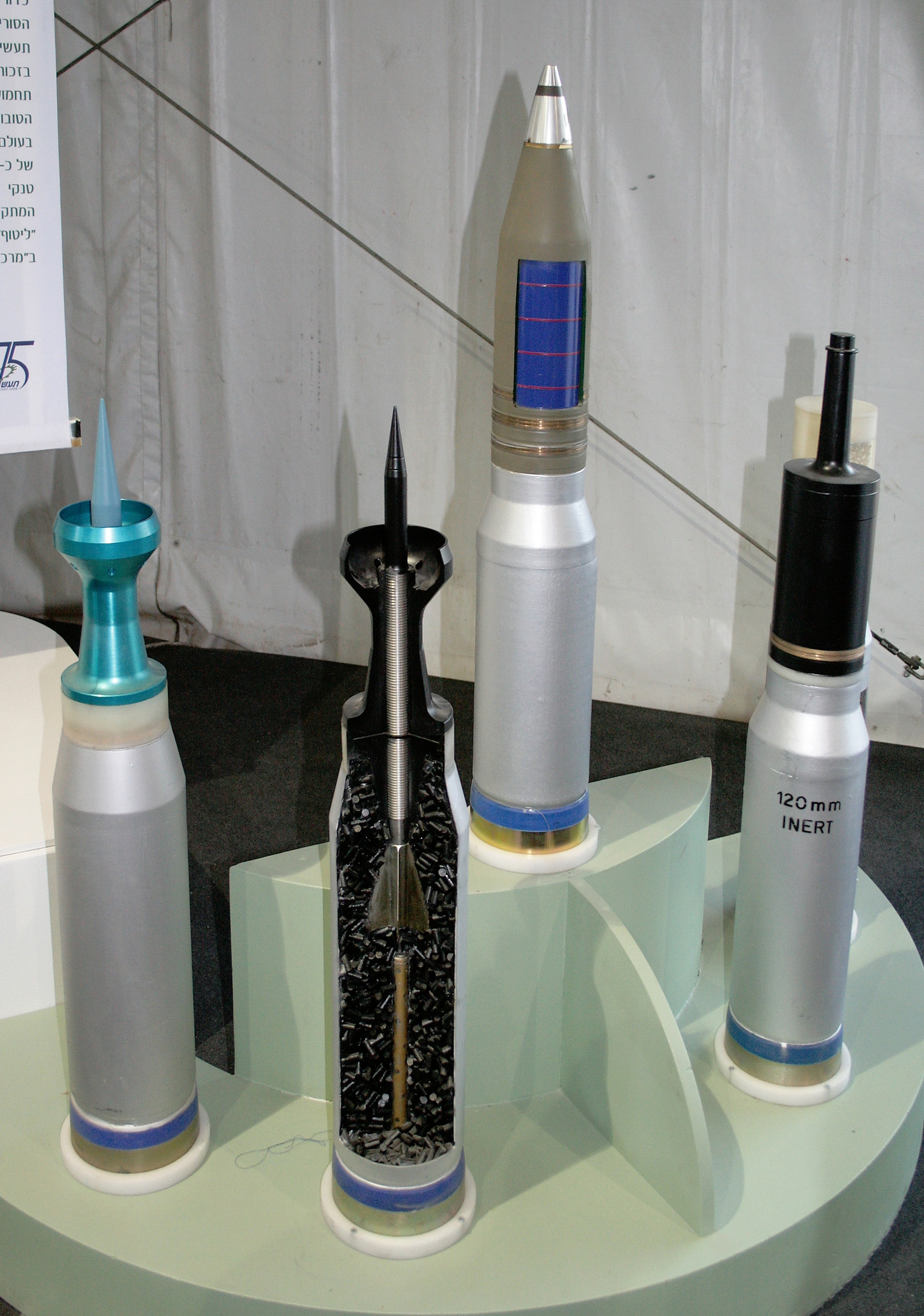
Modern 120 mm tank gun cartridges with different projectiles

Tank ammunition was developed in World War I as tanks first appeared on the battlefield. However, as tank-on-tank warfare developed (including the development of anti-tank warfare artillery), more specialized forms of ammunition were developed, such as high-explosive anti-tank (HEAT) warheads and armour-piercing discarding sabot (APDS), including armour-piercing fin-stabilized discarding sabot (APFSDS) rounds. The development of shaped charges has had a significant impact on anti-tank ammunition design, now common in both tank-fired ammunition and in anti-tank missiles, including anti-tank guided missiles.

==== Naval ====
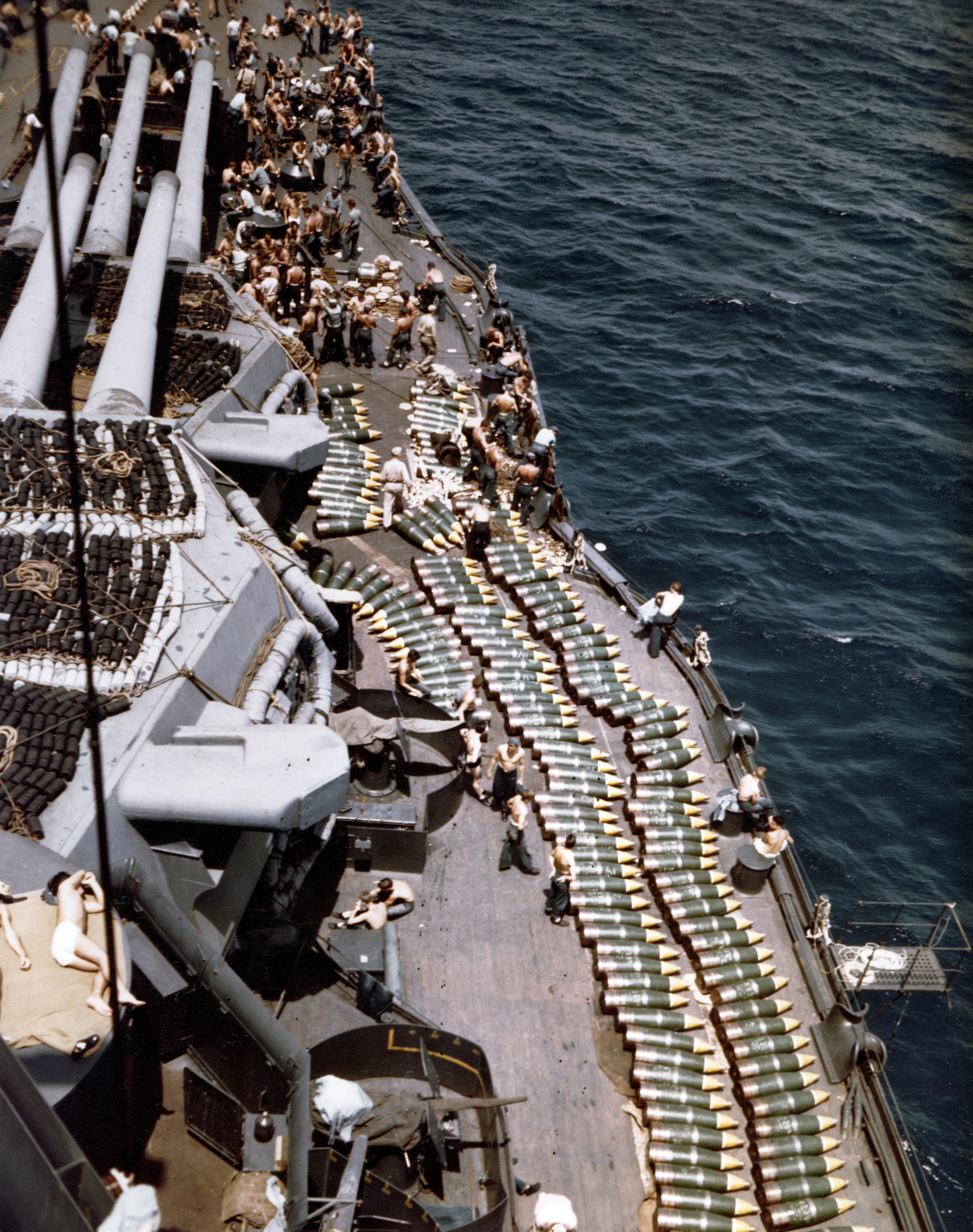
Fourteen-inch ammunition on the deck of a battleship in 1944.

Naval weapons were originally the same as many land-based weapons, but the ammunition was designed for specific use, such as a solid shot designed to hole an enemy ship and chain-shot to cut rigging and sails. Modern naval engagements have occurred over far longer distances than historic battles, so as ship armor has increased in strength and thickness, the ammunition to defeat it has also changed. Naval ammunition is now designed to reach very high velocities (to improve its armor-piercing abilities) and may have specialized fuzes to defeat specific types of vessels. However, due to the extended ranges at which modern naval combat may occur, guided missiles have largely supplanted guns and shells.

== Logistics ==
With every successive improvement in military arms, a corresponding change has occurred in the method of supplying ammunition in the required quantities. As soon as projectiles were required (such as javelins and arrows), there needed to be a method of replenishment. When non-specialized, interchangeable, or recoverable ammunition was used (e.g., arrows), it was possible to pick up spent arrows (both friendly and enemy) and reuse them. However, with the advent of explosive or non-recoverable ammunition, this was no longer possible, and new ammunition supplies would be needed.

The weight of ammunition required, particularly for artillery shells, can be considerable, necessitating extra time to replenish supplies. In modern times, there has been an increase in the standardization of many ammunition types among allies (e.g., the NATO Standardization Agreement) that has enabled the sharing of ammunition types (e.g., 5.56×45mm NATO).

== Environmental problems ==
As of 2013, lead-based ammunition production is the second-largest annual use of lead in the US, accounting for over 60,000 metric tons consumed in 2012. Lead bullets that miss their target or remain in a carcass or body that was never retrieved can enter environmental systems and become toxic to wildlife. The US military has experimented with replacing lead with copper as a slug in their green bullets which reduces the dangers posed by lead in the environment as a result of artillery. Since 2010, this has eliminated over 2000 tons of lead in waste streams.

Hunters are also encouraged to use monolithic bullets, which exclude any lead content.

== Unexploded ordnance ==
Unexploded ammunition can remain active for a very long time and poses a significant threat to both humans and the environment.

== See also ==
- Air travel with firearms and ammunition
- Ammunition box
- Ammunition column
- Armor-piercing shell
- Breaching round
- Expanding bullet
- Firearm propellant
- Full metal jacket bullet
- Handloading
- High-explosive incendiary
- Hollow-point bullet
- Howitzer
- International Ammunition Association
- KE munition
- List of handgun cartridges
- List of rebated rim cartridges
- List of rifle cartridges
- Naval artillery
- Overpressure ammunition
- Proximity fuze
- Rotation of ammunition
- Shot (pellet)
- Table of handgun and rifle cartridges
- Tubes and primers for ammunition
