= International Ammunition Association =

The International Ammunition Association (IAA) is a nonprofit organization whose stated purpose is to foster interest and knowledge in ammunition of all types and forms.

It was founded in 1955 as the International Cartridge Collectors Association (ICCA), and later changed to its current name. The organization publishes a bi-monthly journal called the IAA Journal.

== See also ==
- European Cartridge Research Association
- Air travel with firearms and ammunition
- CIP, a European standardization organization for firearm cartridges
- SAAMI, an American standardization organization for firearm cartridges
