= Lehigh Defense =

American ammunition manufacturer

Lehigh Defense, LLC
- Company type: Bullet manufacturer
- Industry: Ammunition
- Headquarters: Clarksville, Texas, USA
- Products: bullets
- Website: Lehigh Defense

Lehigh Defense is a US bullet manufacturer, known primarily (in the civilian market) for its line of solid copper monolithic bullets, located in Clarksville, Texas. Wilson Combat bought the company in 2021.
