= Explosives shipping classification system =

Part of the United Nations Recommendations on the Transport of Dangerous Goods

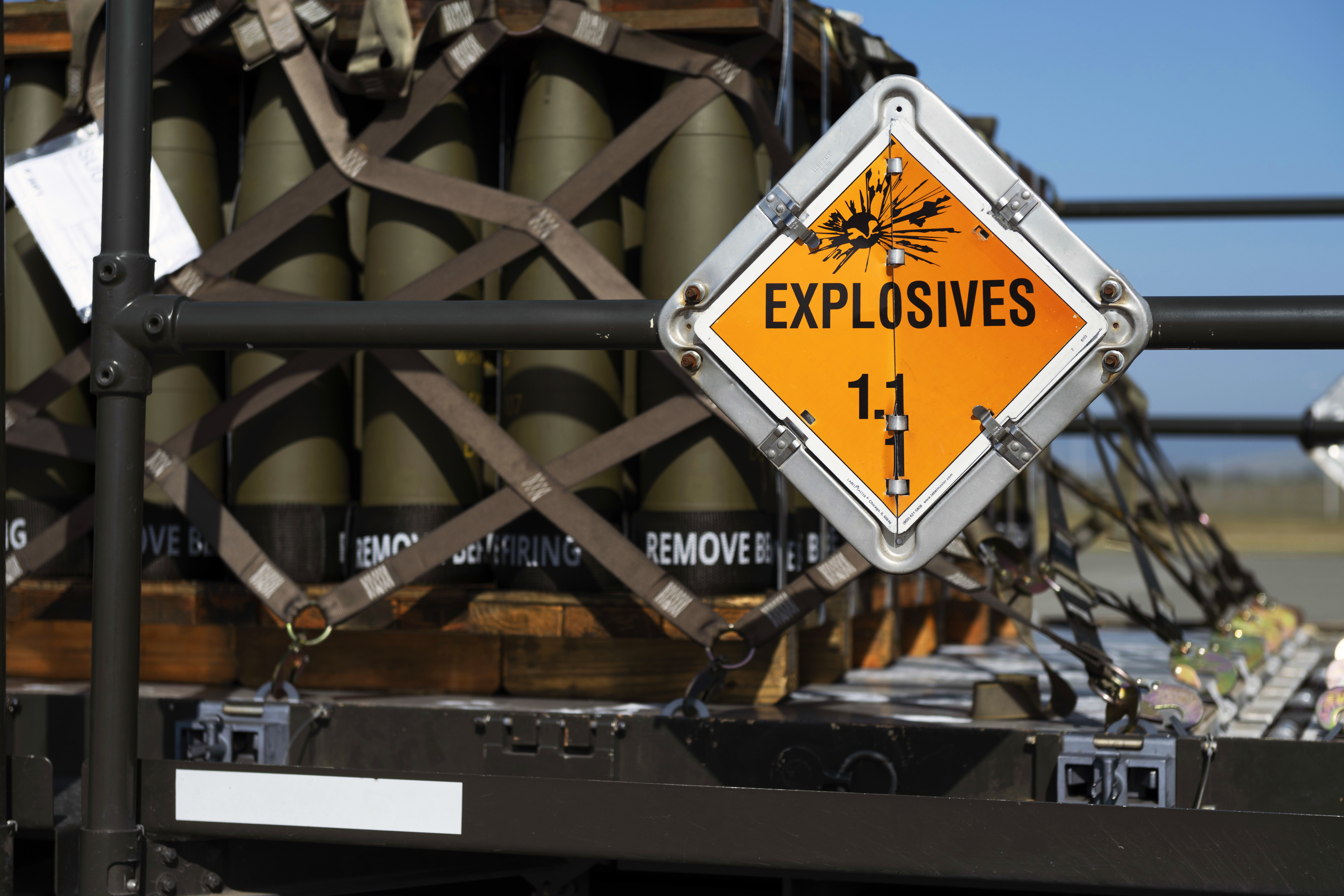
Munitions Transport of Division 1.1 Explosives

The Explosive Shipping Classification System exists as part of the United Nations Recommendations on the Transport of Dangerous Good: Model Regulations. (Note: Referred to as ′UN Model Regulations′ from this point forward) The system describes the classification of explosives, divisions within that class that describe the type of hazard they present and compatibility groups that identify the specific type of explosive substance, and what articles are compatible for transport and storage.

== Classification ==
=== Class ===
Substances and goods subject to these regulation are assigned to one of 9 Classes detailed within the UN Model Regulations, determined by the predominant hazard of the substance or goods. Class 1 Goods and Substances are classified as Explosives, under the UN Explosive Hazard Classification System and Codes that is also outlined within the International Ammunition Technical Guideline (IATG).

=== Divisions ===
Class 1 goods are subdivided further into one of 6 distinct divisions, that describes the predominant explosive hazard that exists if that article was to detonate or activate while in transport or storage. These divisions are as follows:

- Class 1: Explosives
  - Division 1.1: Explosive that has a mass explosion hazard. A mass explosion is a detonation of almost entire load instantaneously.
  - Division 1.2: Goods and Substances without a mass explosion hazard, but with a projection (shrapnel/fragmentation).
  - Division 1.3: Goods and substances with a mass fire hazard, and a minor, blast and/or projection hazard, but without a mass explosion hazard
  - Division 1.4: Goods and substances with no significant explosive hazard. Explosive effect mostly contained by packaging. A fire must not cause an instantaneous mass explosion.
  - Division 1.5: Very insensitive goods and substances, with a mass explosion hazard (explosive considered so insensitive that initiation or transition from burning to detonation very unlikely under normal transport conditions).
  - Division 1.6: Extremely insensitive goods and substances without a mass explosion hazard (articles that contain predominantly extremely insensitive explosives, with negligible probability of accidental detonation, initiation, or propagation.

Explosive article are assigned a Class and a Division to determine a specific Hazard Division (HD) under this regulation, following a classification process and a number of tests. Under the UN Dangerous Goods classification, explosive hazard Divisions are awarded using the UN Manual of Criteria and Tests, by following the process flow chart '10.3 Procedure for assignment to a division of the class of explosives' and conducting the appropriate tests either UN series 5, series 6, or series 7 tests. Series 5 tests are used to determine if an article can be assigned to HD1.5 'Very Insensitive Explosive'; series 6 tests are used to determine the classification of an article within Hazard Divisions 1.1, 1.2, 1.3, or 1.4; and series 7 tests are used to determine if an article can be assigned to HD 1.6 as an article containing predominantly 'Extremely Insensitive Explosives'.

UN HD 1.4S Transport Placard

=== Compatibility Group ===
Generally speaking Dangerous Goods should not be transported together in the same container, this includes the shipment of different kinds of explosives, as the potential for an inadvertent detonation can increase dramatically if two highly incompatible explosives are transported together. To enable efficient transportation and storage, and, to allow the transportation of some explosives together, a further classification system is used called compatibility groups (CGs). Compatibility groups helps to group explosives of a similar type together, or allow the transportation of combinations that have been deemed safe. Hazard divisions and compatibility groups don't classify specific explosive compounds or substances, but rather an HD and CG classifies a specific article of explosive, including its packaging.

Compatibility groups further divide Class 1 explosives on the basis of the type explosive compound and risk of activation, or for CG 'S' the article's packaging, in order to determine which types of explosives are safe to transport with each other. Most explosives will be classified into groups, A, B, C, D, E, F and S. The other groups classify It is possible that two articles containing a number of the same explosive product (i.e. electric detonators) with different inner and outer packaging, could have Hazard Classifications of 1.2B and 1.4S, making one of the articles significantly safer to transport with other explosives.

==== Groups ====
The following is a list of compatibility groups, and a description of the substances or articles in that group. A substance is an explosive compound on its own; an article is an end user explosive product.

- Group A: Primary explosive substance.
- Group B: Article containing a primary explosive substance and not containing two or more effective protective features. Some articles, such as detonators for blasting, detonator assemblies for blasting and primers, cap-type, are included, even though they do not contain primary explosives.
- Group C: Propellant explosive substance or other deflagrating explosive substance or article containing such explosive substance.
- Group D: Secondary detonating explosive substance or black powder or article containing a secondary detonating explosive substance, in each case without means of initiation and without a propelling charge, or article containing a primary explosive substance and containing two or more effective protective features.
- Group E: Article containing a secondary detonating explosive substance, without means of initiation, with a propelling charge (other than one containing flammable liquid or gel or hypergolic liquid).
- Group F: Article containing a secondary detonating explosive substance with its means of initiation, with a propelling charge (other than one containing flammable liquid or gel or hypergolic liquid) or without a propelling charge.
- Group G: Pyrotechnic substance or article containing a pyrotechnic substance, or article containing both an explosive substance and an illuminating, incendiary, tear-producing or smoke-producing substance (other than a water-activated article or one containing white phosphorus, phosphide or flammable liquid or gel or hypergolic liquid).
- Group H: Article containing both an explosive substance and white phosphorus
- Group J: Article containing both an explosive substance and flammable liquid or gel
- Group K: Article containing both an explosive substance and a toxic chemical agent.
- Group L: Explosive substance or article containing an explosive substance and presenting a special risk (e.g., due to water-activation or presence of hypergolic liquids, phosphides or pyrophoric substances) needing isolation of each type.
- Group N: Articles predominantly containing extremely insensitive substances.
- Group S: Substance or article so packed or designed that any hazardous effects arising from accidental functioning are limited to the extent that they do not significantly hinder or prohibit fire fighting or other emergency response efforts in the immediate vicinity of the package.

Explosive Hazard Division and Compatibility Group Combination Matrix
Hazard Division	Compatibility Group												
Hazard Division	A	B	C	D	E	F	G	H	J	K	L	N	S
1.1	1.1A	1.1B	1.1C	1.1D	1.1E	1.1F	1.1G		1.1J		1.1L		
1.2		1.2B	1.2C	1.2D	1.2E	1.2F	1.2G	1.2H	1.2J	1.2K	1.2L		
1.3			1.3C			1.3F	1.3G	1.3H	1.3J	1.3K	1.3L		
1.4		1.4B	1.4C	1.4D	1.4E	1.4F	1.4G						1.4S
1.5				1.5D									
1.6												1.6N	

== Hazard Classification and Compatibility Matrix ==
Compatibility Group → Explosive Hazard ↓	A	B	C	D	E	F	G	H	J	K	L	N	S
1.1 Mass explosion	1.1A Mercury fulminate, Lead azide Etc.	1.1B Blasting caps, ingitors	1.1C Rocket motors, smokeless powder	1.1D Detonating cord, explosive boosters, blackpowder, most secondary explosives	1.1E	1.1F	1.1G Flash powder, Bulk Salutes, very large fireworks		1.1J Liquid fuelled cruise missiles and torpedoes, incendiary bombs		1.1L		
1.2 Projection, no mass explosion		1.2B Detonating fuzes	1.2C Rocket motors, propelling charges	1.2D Hand grenades, shaped charges	1.2E Rockets with bursting charges	1.2F	1.2G Large fireworks, practice grenades	1.2H White phosphorus grenades	1.2J	1.2K Chemical shells	1.2L Hypergolic fuelled rocket motors		
1.3 Fire, minor blast			1.3C Smokeless powder, rocket motors			1.3F Fuzed hand grenades	1.3G Display Fireworks, smoke grenades, flares	1.3H	1.3J	1.3K	1.3L Hypergolic fuelled rocket motors		
1.4 Minor hazard		1.4B Blasting Caps	1.4C Model rocket motors	1.4D Det. Cord	1.4E	1.4F	1.4G Consumer Fireworks, Proximate Pyro						1.4S Proximate Pyro, Blasting Caps, Small Arms Ammunition
1.5 Very insensitive, mass explosion				1.5D Blasting Agents									
1.6 Extremely insensitive												1.6N Extremely Insensitive Explosives	

=== Permitted Compatibility Mixing ===
Example of an explosives placard 1.1B

In some cases it may be appropriate and safe to mix explosives when transporting or storing them, certain compatibility groups may be mixed with others and still remain safe.

Permitted Mixing of Compatibility Groups
Compatibility Group	A	B	C	D	E	F	G	H	J	K	L	N	S
A	^{a.}												
B		X											X^{g.}
C			X	X^{c,d,}	X^{c.}		X^{f.}					X^{d.}	X^{g.}
D			X^{c,d,}	X	X^{c.}		X^{f.}					X^{d.}	X^{g.}
E			X^{c.}	X^{c.}	X		X^{f.}					X^{d.}	X^{g.}
F						X							X^{g.}
G			X^{f.}	X^{f.}	X^{f.}		X						X^{g.}
H								X					X^{g.}
J									X				X^{g.}
K										X			X^{g.}
L											X^{b.}		
N			X^{d.}	X^{d.}	X^{d.}							X	X^{g.}
S		X^{g.}	X^{g.}	X^{g.}	X^{g.}	X^{g.}	X^{g.}	X^{g.}	X^{g.}	X^{g.}		X^{g.}	X

X Denotes compatibility groups that can be mixed in transport.

Detonators/blasting caps, may not be packaged together with any other explosive.

a. Different explosives of compatibility group A should be packaged separately

b. Explosives of compatibility group L shall only be packed with an identical explosive.

c. Explosive articles of the compatibility group C, D, or E may be packed together, and the whole packaged shall be treated as belonging to compatibility group E.

d. Explosive articles of the compatibility group C and D may be packed together, and the whole packaged shall be treated as belonging to compatibility group D.

e. Explosive articles of the compatibility group C, D, E or N may be packed together, and the whole packaged shall be treated as belonging to compatibility group D.

f. Explosive belonging to the compatibility group G except for fireworks, may be packaged together with compatibility groups C, D, and E, provided they are not carried in the same compartment, carry box, or vehicle, and the whole packaged shall be treated as belonging to compatibility group E.

g. Explosive of compatibility group S, may be packaged together with explosives of any other group, except A or L, and the combined packaged may be treated as belonging to any of the compatibility groups most appropriate, except S.

== See also ==
- Air travel with firearms and ammunition
- List of UN numbers 0301 to 0400 – Numbers, classes, and proper shipping names allocated to dangerous goods

== Links ==
- INTERNATIONAL AMMUNITION TECHNICAL GUIDELINE (IATG) 01.50, UN explosive hazard classification system and codes, Second edition, 2015-02-01
- Guiding Principles for the Development of the UN Model Regulations - 19th Revised Edition 2015
- UN Manual of Criteria and Tests 7th Revised Edition 2019
- Transport Canada, Transportation of Dangerous Goods Regulations
- Transport Canada, Statutory Instruments (Regulations) SOR/2008-34
- Australian Code for the Transport of Explosives by Road or Rail - Third Edition
