= Rotation of ammunition =

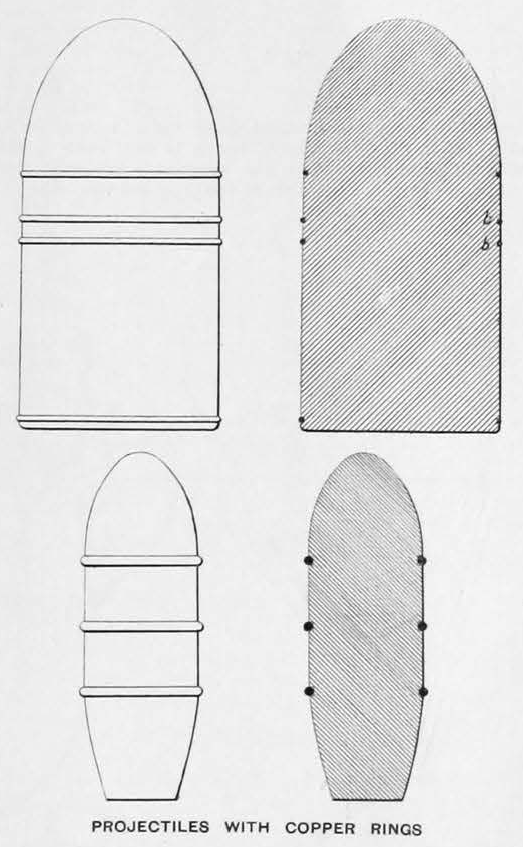
Examples of projectiles with copper rings, shown in The Engineer, November 20, 1908.

Rotation of ammunition is a term used with reference to guns. Projectiles intended for RML (rifled muzzle-loading) guns were at first fitted with a number of gun-metal studs arranged around them in a spiral manner corresponding to the twist of rifling. Invented in mid-1840s by Giovanni Cavalli, this method was defective, as it allowed, as in the old smooth-bore guns, the powder gas to escape by the clearance (called "windage") between the projectile and the bore, with a consequent loss of efficiency; it also quickly eroded the bore of the larger guns. Multiple solution to the problems were invented in two following decades, both for muzzle-loaders and breech-loaders.

In 1855 Andrew Hotchkiss patented an RML projectile, in which two parts squeezed a lead ring to obturate the barrel under the pressure of gunpowder fumes. After his death in 1858 his brother Benjamin, later a renowned arms designer and industrialist, adapted the design to practical use, and the Union Army fired them during the American Civil War.

In the same year Joseph Whitworth patented polygonal projectiles mechanically fitted with polygonal rifling in the muzzle-loaders. They were used in the same war by the Confederates.

Later the rotation was effected by a cupped copper disc called an "automatic gas-check" attached to the base end of the projectile. The powder gas pressure expanded the rim of the gas check into the rifling grooves and prevented the escape of gas; it also firmly fixed the gas check to the projectile, thus causing it to rotate. A more regular and efficient action of the powder gas was thus ensured, with a corresponding greater range and an improvement in accuracy.

With the earlier Armstrong (RBL or rifled breech loading) guns the projectiles were coated with lead (the late Lord Armstrong's system), the lead being forced through the rifling grooves by the pressure of the exploded powder gas. The lead coating is, however, too soft with the higher velocities of modern B.L. guns.

Vavasseur devised the plan of fitting by hydraulic pressure a copper "driving band" into a groove cut around the body of the projectile and patented it in 1866. This is now universal. It not only fulfills the purpose of rotating the projectile, but renders possible the use of large charges of slow-burning explosive. The copper band, on being forced through the gun, gives rise to considerable resistance, which allows the propelling charge to burn properly and thus to exert its enormous force on the projectile.

The laws which govern projectile designs are not well-defined. Certain formulae are used which give the thickness of the shell walls for a known chamber pressure in the gun, and for a particular stress on the shell material. The exact proportions of the shell depend, however, greatly on experimental knowledge.
