= Monolithic bullet =

Homogeneous bullet made from one solid material

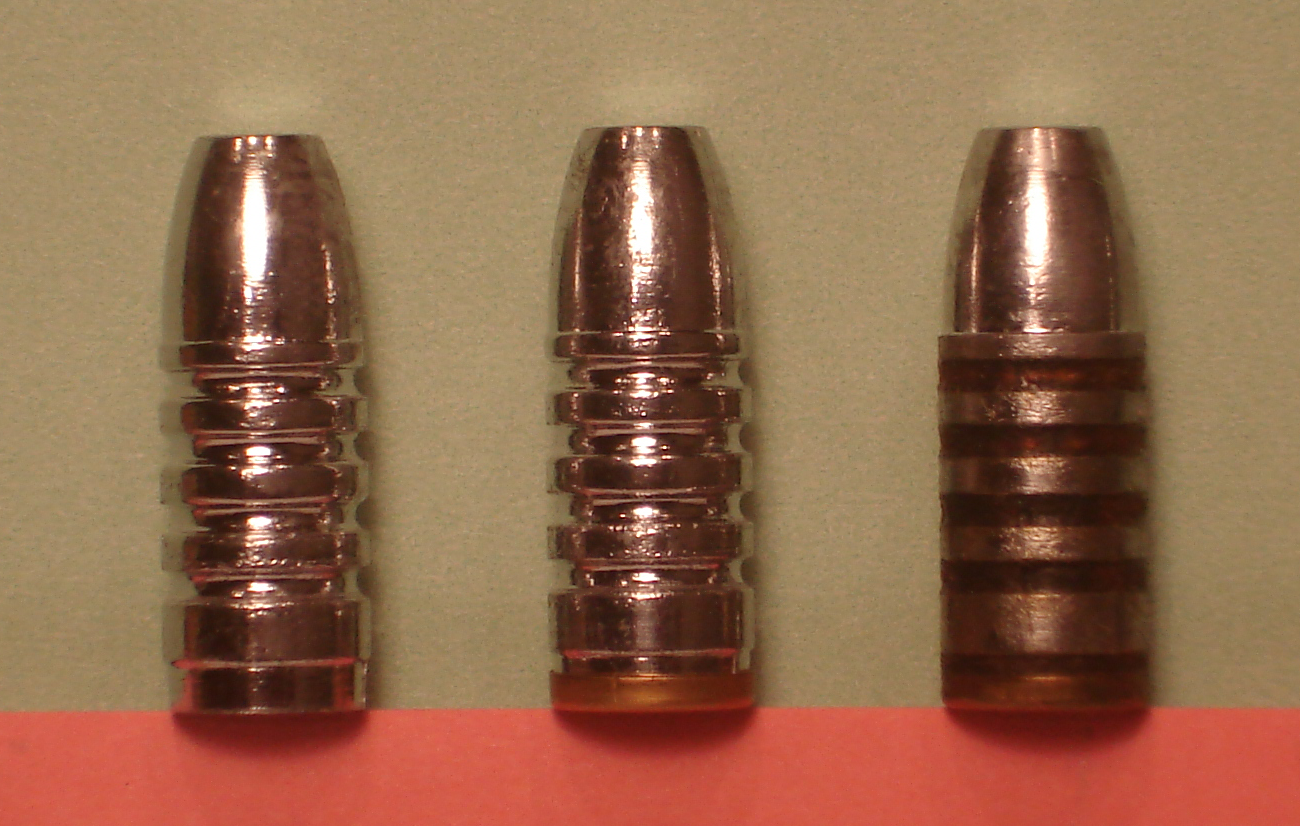
Hard cast solid bullet (left), with gas check (center) and lubrication (right)

Monolithic bullets are bullets constructed from a one solid material, usually metal, and do not have multiple components. Unlike jacketed hollow point bullets (JHP), monolithic bullets do not have a jacket, cup, core, or tip. They are instead a solid material, typically copper or a copper-zinc brass alloy, although historically any bullet made of a single type of metal can be referred to as a monolithic bullet. Monolithic bullets depart quite dramatically from the better known lead- or jacketed bullet, and offer a more environmentally friendly alternative to the toxicity associated with lead bullets. As a result of increasing environmental concerns over the toxicity levels found in lead-based bullets, some areas in the United States of America have banned the use of lead bullets for hunting purposes. This increasing awareness of the dangers of lead bullets has led to the development of the modern monolithic bullet, which now provides a viable and accurate alternative to the use of lead for shooting.

== Differences between lead and monolithic bullets ==
Monolithic bullets are less toxic to the environment, humans and animals

- Monolithic bullets retain their weight better than lead bullets. However, lead bullets perform better at velocities lower than 1800 feet per second, as at these lower velocities, most monolithic bullets will not expand.

At distances beyond 300 yards premium lead bullets are more accurate due to a higher ballistic coefficient.

- Lead is a much denser material than copper. Lead also tends to mold itself better to the shape of the barrel, whilst monolithic copper bullets tend to retain their shape in the barrel. Due to the soft nature of the copper in monolithic bullets, copper barrel fouling has been a concern amongst hunters in the past. New generation monolithic bullets, such as those manufactured by Peregrine Bullets in South Africa, Hammer bullets from Montana, or Lehigh Defense LLC, are designed in such a way that copper fouling is no longer a concern.
- Accuracy achieved when using monolithic bullets is comparable to premium lead hunting bullets at moderate hunting distances, however at longer ranges due to the higher ballistic coefficient premium lead hunting bullets are more accurate. For example, fired from the same rifle at comparable velocities, at 500 yards a .338-calibre, 225-grain Barnes "Tipped Triple-Shock X" monolithic bullet drops 77 inches from the muzzle, while a Nosler "Partition" (a lead-cored bullet) of the same calibre and weight drops 73 inches from the muzzle.
- Monolithic bullets are about the same price as premium lead hunting bullets. For example a box of 50 Barnes TTSX (monolithic) and Nosler Accubonds (bonded lead) is ~$30 USA,

== Modern development ==
Monolithic bullets have been used for hunting big game in the USA for decades. The first popular all-copper bullet was the Barnes X bullet in 1986. Since then, most bullet companies have a monolithic bullet on the market, including Nosler E-tips, Hornady GMX, Barnes TTSX, LRX, VOR-TX, Federal Trophy Copper, Winchester Powercore 95/5, Hammer bullets, Cutting Edge Bullets, Lehigh Defense, G9 Defense etc.

Although many attempts have been made throughout the years to develop a successful monolithic bullet, numerous difficulties with the use of copper as the bullet material have hindered progress in this regard. These difficulties included the following:

- Increased bullet length to achieve similar weights to lead bullets.
- Increased pressure on the chamber and barrel of the rifle (due to greater start pressure needed to get the harder solid bullet into the bore, and to greater bullet length).
- Decreased barrel life due to copper barrel fouling.
- Inflexibility of the monolithic bullet in the barrel of the rifle.

As monolithic bullets have developed, their performance in terms of penetration and weight retention versus hydrostatic shock varies. For example, the monolithics Nosler E-Tip and Barnes TSX at 400 yards the expansion range dropped slightly while the monolith Cutting Edge Copper Raptor expanded even at 400 yards

== Fluid transfer monolithic ==
Fluid transfer monolithic bullets (FTM) are monolithic bullets which contain a geometry designed to move fluid dense tissue in order to cause wounding to a soft target. Unlike jacketed hollow point bullets (JHP), FTMs do not rely on expansion to function as designed. The geometry of the bullet channels the fluid within a soft target radially away from the bullet's path causing significant trauma and tissue tearing. Because fluid generally has low compressibility it is particularly effective as a cutting tool.

By removing the common failure points associated with a JHP bullet (late/early expansion, failure to expand, jacket separation), FTMs have proven extremely consistent and reliable. Additionally, FTMs are known to be "Barrier Blind", meaning that they do not fail on barriers such as auto glass or sheet metal. The FTM's barrier blind attributes are mostly due to the fact that a monolithic metal bullet (commonly constructed of copper), has greater hardness and lower density than a lead bullet. Therefore, FTMs are able to achieve higher velocity and maintain their structural integrity on contact with barriers, whereas lead core JHPs are traveling at lower velocity and often deform on barriers. Notable examples of FTM bullets include G9 Defense EHP and Woodsman, Lehigh Defense E-XD and XC, Inceptor Ammunition ARX, Black Hills Honey Badger, and the Winchester Hybrid-X.

== Applications ==
By nature, modern monolithic bullets are very effective for hunting particularly larger game. This is due to the fact that these bullets retain their size and shape far better than lead alternatives and therefore often penetrate more deeply. With larger animals, this gives a better chance of penetrating to the vitals and deliver kinetic energy to disrupt them. Not only does this mean that the thicker, tougher skin of larger animals can be more effectively penetrated, it also makes the bullet more adept at breaking bone and delivering a terminal impact. As a result, monolithic bullets are particularly useful when hunting larger game such as moose and bear, or to take on hunting trips to Africa, where very large game, such as elephants, have often successfully been hunted with monolithic bullets.

An additional benefit is an exit hole which allows for more efficient blood trailing, important for long-hair game such as bears.

As a result of the monolithic bullet's feature to retain their mass so well these bullets have also gained popularity for hunting smaller game and even varmints. As a bullet that retains its shape the monolithic bullet will not break apart and cause meat damage to downed game of any size. This is a big benefit when hunting small targets that generally have little meat. In addition, there is less of a health hazard in terms of human food compared to bonded lead bullets.

Finally, lead-based bullets are typically used for target competitions where accuracy is the goal. From long range bench shooting, to Olympic biathlon, bonded lead bullets are used.
