= Air travel with firearms and ammunition =

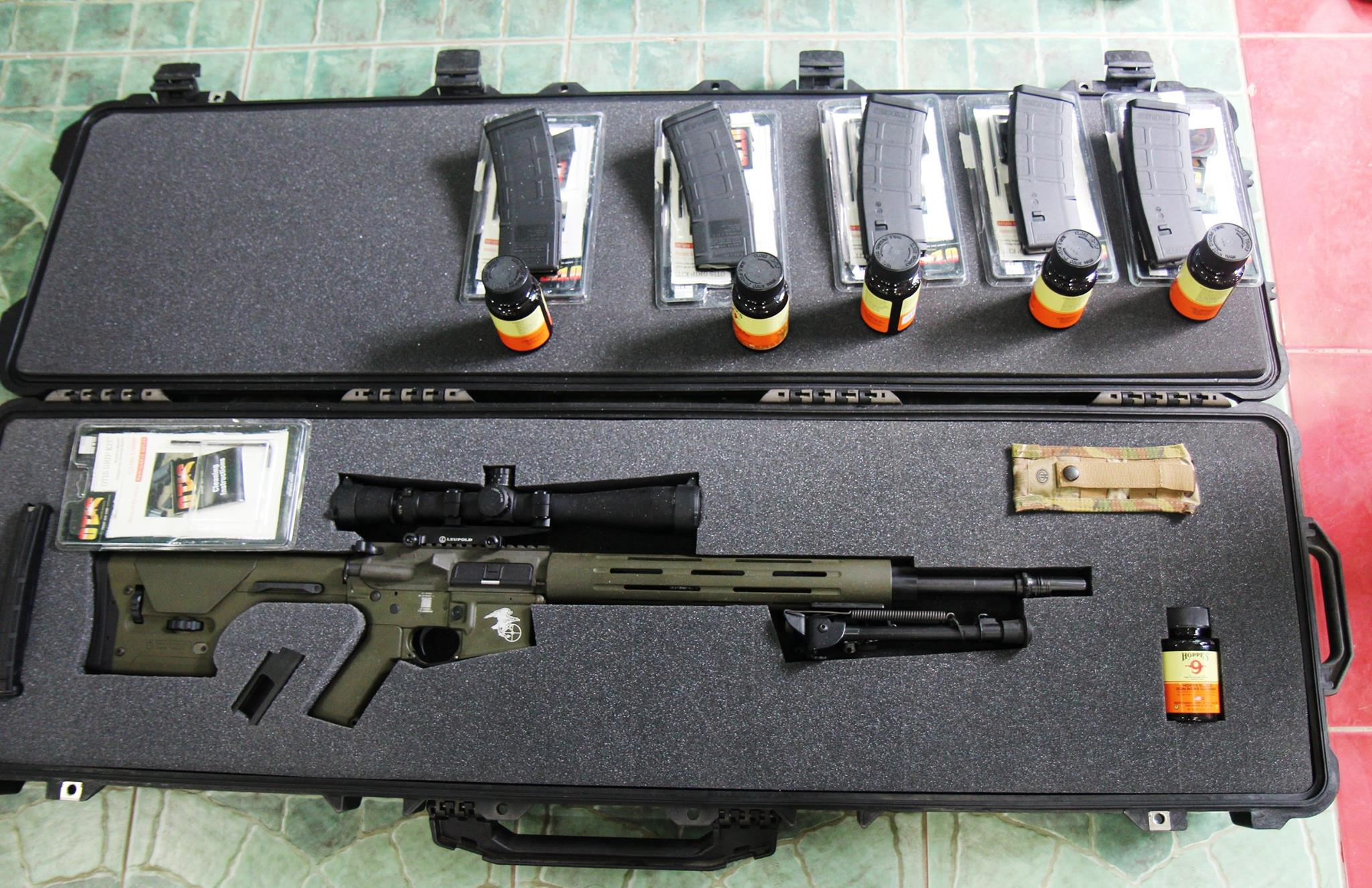
Hardcase firearm cases and/or ammunition cases are often required for air travel with firearms and ammunition.

Air travel with firearms and ammunition involves a number of laws, regulations and practices that travelers with firearms or ammunition must comply with and should be familiar with before travel. The main rules are set by the International Air Transport Association (IATA), but there are a number of local variations between airlines and local laws that sometimes are conflicting.

Ammunition categories are used to define firearm ammunition types considered safe for transport. The UN Division system and UN Number system categorizes any explosive material by the speed of burning and amount of explosive. The United Nations has also instituted a categorisation system specifically for handgun ammunition. Both these systems can be used together to define safe amounts of ammunition that can be carried on various modes of transport, including civilian scheduled flights.

== IATA airline scheduled flight permissions and approvals ==
The phrase Div. 1.4S, UN 0012 or UN 0014 denotes the categories of ammunition that the IATA permits to be carried on passenger flights. In simple terms, each passenger may carry up to 5 kg of weapons cartridges of less than 19.1 mm caliber being either blanks or with solid projectiles, in their checked baggage. The IATA published the minimum requirement for an airline for the carriage of dangerous goods in a table, where ammunition of the following nature can only be carried subject to the following permissions and approvals:

Ammunition (cartridges for weapons), securely packaged (in Div. 1.4S, UN 0012 or UN 0014 only), in quantities not exceeding 5 kg (11 lb) gross weight per person for that person's own use, excluding ammunition with explosive or incendiary projectiles. Allowances for more than one passenger must not be combined into one or more packages.

- Permitted in carry on baggage: NO
- Permitted in or as checked baggage: YES
- Permitted on one's person: NO
- The approval of the operator(s) is required: YES
- The pilot in command must be informed of the location: NO

== Local deviations from the IATA rules ==
Local gun laws may deviate from IATA rules by prohibiting it with some types of weapons or having special rules for transport that sometimes conflict with IATA regulations. Airlines may also have their own rules and procedures that sometimes conflict with each other, with IATA rules or even local laws and regulations. For example, some jurisdictions require the firearm and ammunition to be transported in separate cases, while other jurisdictions require them to be transported in the same case. This may, depending on jurisdiction, be solved by using two or more separate cases fitted inside a common larger case. Some jurisdictions even require integral parts of the firearm to be disassembled and put into two separate cases, while others require the firearm to be complete. Travelers are therefore encouraged to check all relevant regulations depending on where they travel, both in regards to the departure, destination and any stopovers. Permits or licenses may be required.

== General ammunition fire safety ==
Firearm cartridges in general are regarded as being constructed such that they pose little danger during fires. If ignited by intense heat the cartridge will burst, but the particles will typically not travel very far, and protective firefighter clothing is generally considered sufficient to stop the fragments.

However, if cartridges are stored in an airtight metal chamber, dangerous pressures may occur during a fire. For this reason, it is generally recommended to transport ammunition in original boxes sold by the manufacturer or plastic boxes intended for safe transport.

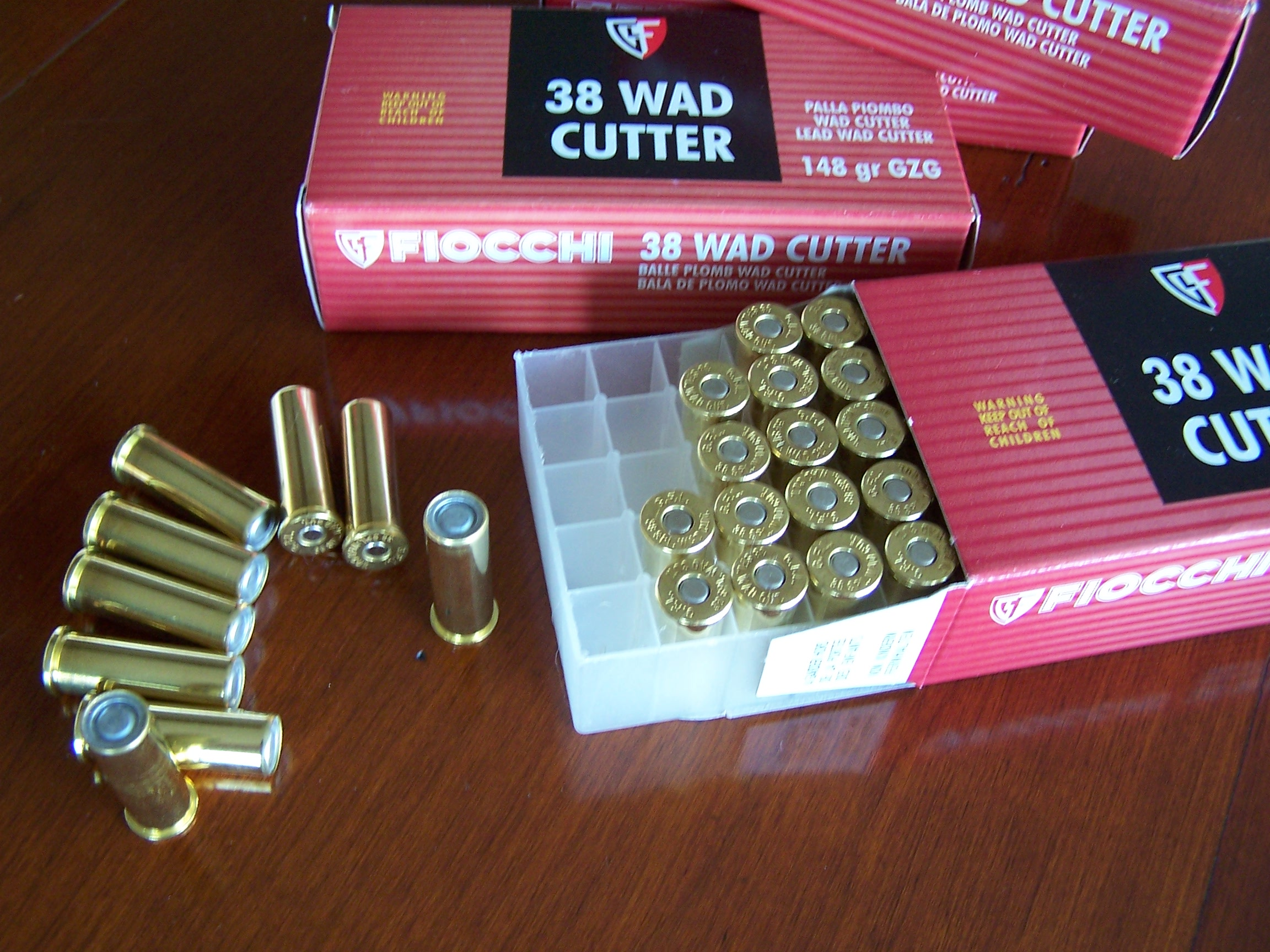
Cardboard containers, generally permitted as checked in luggage.

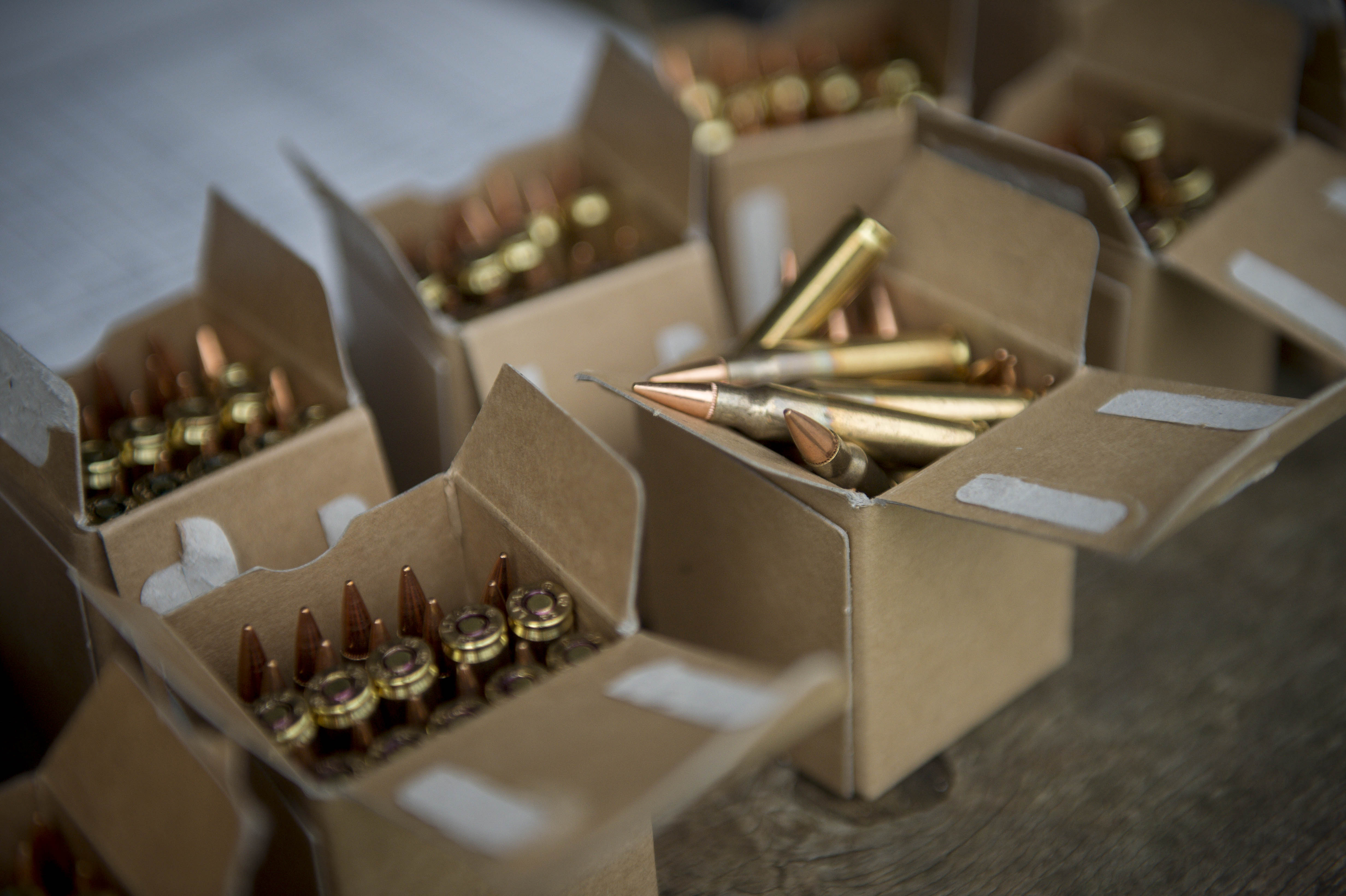
Cardboard containers, generally permitted as checked in luggage.

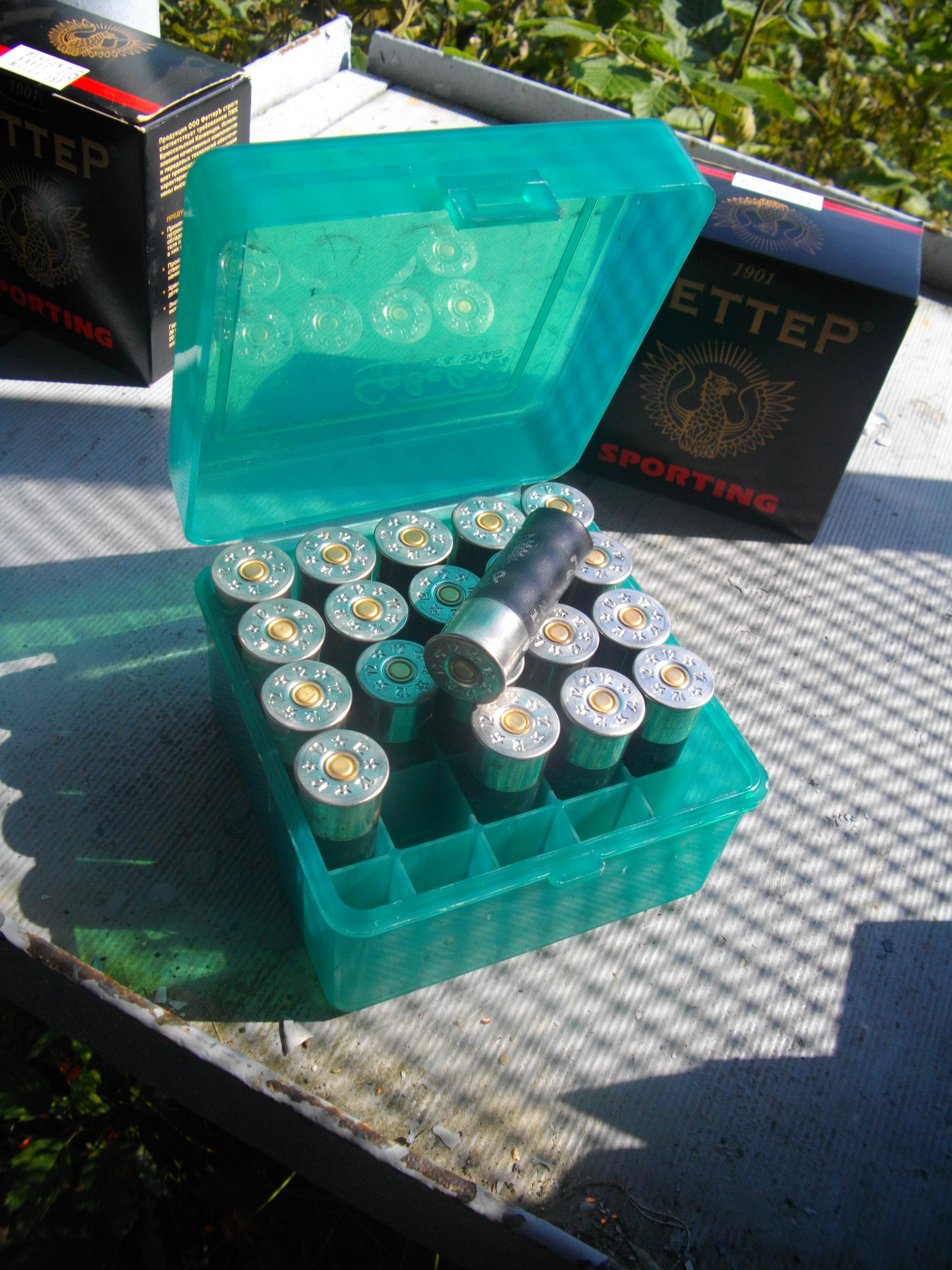
Plastic containers, sometimes permitted as checked in luggage.

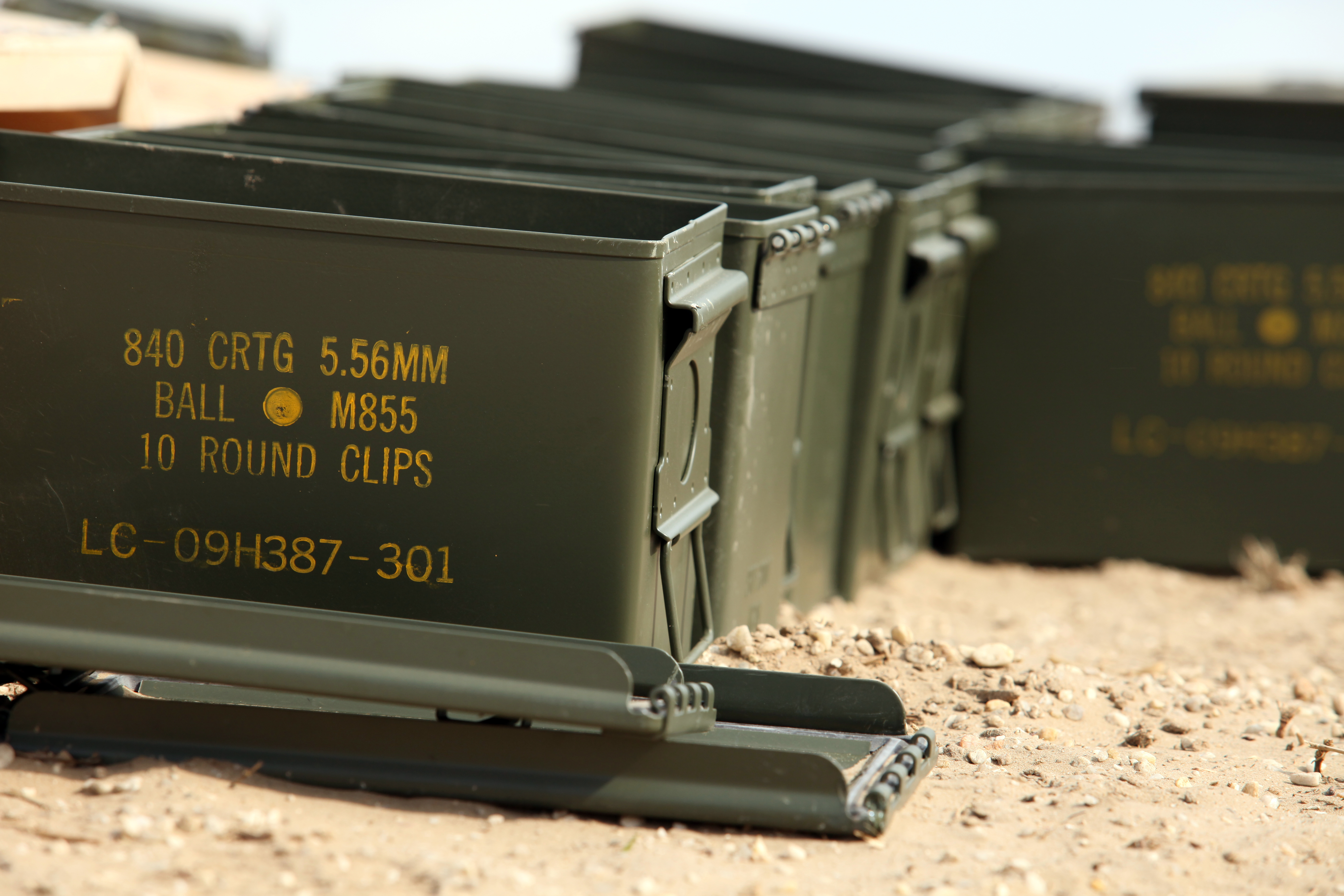
Metal containers, typically not approved as checked in luggage.

== Ammunition categories ==
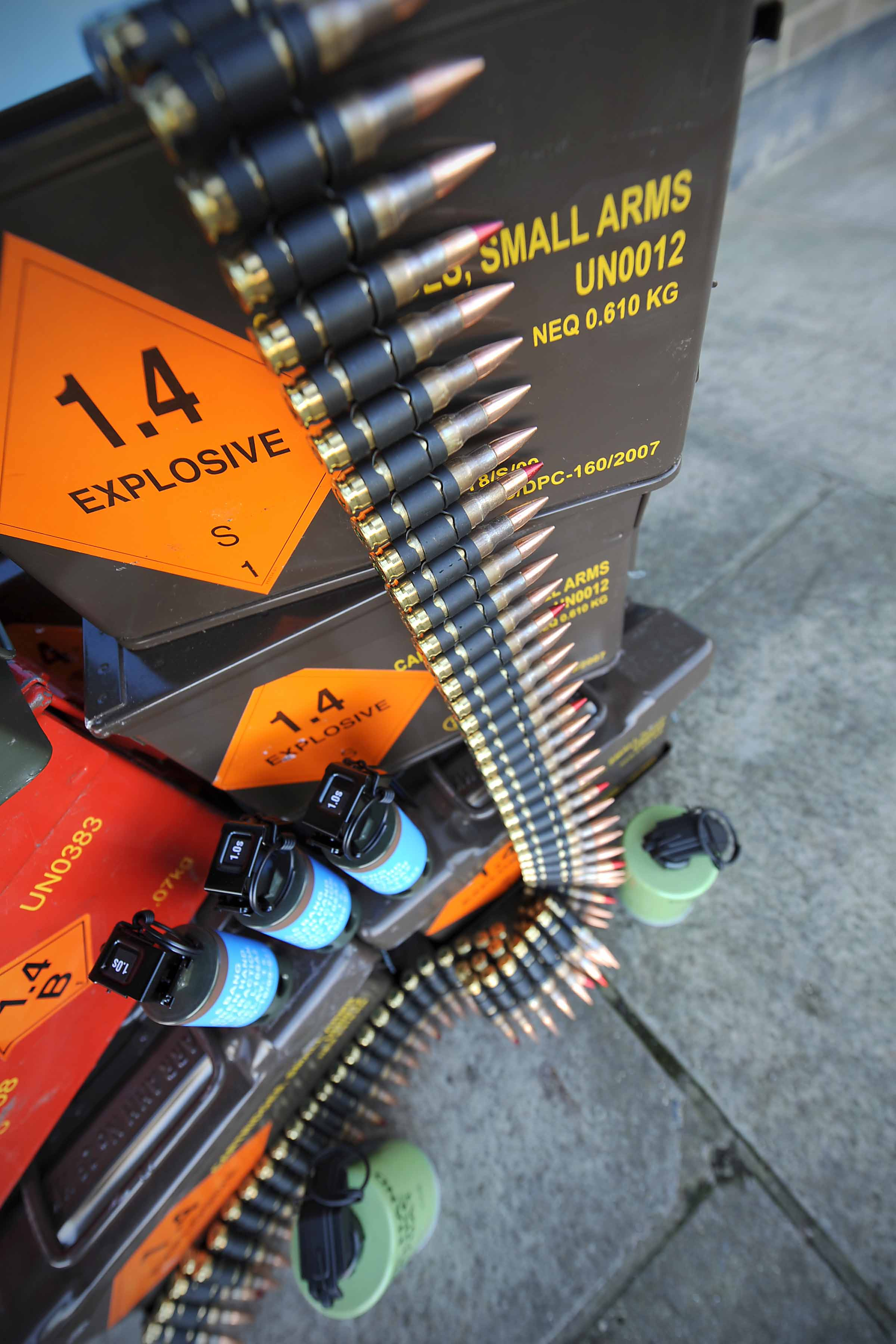
Ammunition box with markings for UN Division 1.4S and UN Number 0012.

=== UN Divisions ===
Most types of civilian firearms ammunition is classified as division 1.4S. The division 1.4 in the UN explosives shipping classification system covers cargo with minor explosion hazard, while the suffix "S" refers to the packaging being made so as to not hinder nearby firefighters. Division 1.4S is referred to by IATA as follows:

Division 1.4S

Articles and substances that present no significant hazard. This division comprises articles and substances, which present only a small hazard in the event of ignition or initiation during transport. The effects are largely confined to the package and no projection of fragments of appreciable size or range is to be expected. An external fire must not cause virtually instantaneous explosion of almost the entire contents of the package.

Note: Articles and substances in this division are placed in Compatibility Group S when they are so packed or designed that any hazardous effects arising from accidental functioning are confined within the package unless the package has been degraded by fire, in which case all blast or projection effects are limited to the extent that they do not significantly hinder fire-fighting or other emergency response efforts in the immediate vicinity of the package.

=== UN Numbers ===
The United Nations has categorised all forms of dangerous goods, and the categories regarding explosive materials are listed at List of UN numbers#UN 0001 to 1000. The most relevant UN numbers for civilian ammunition transport is UN 0012 and UN 0014.

United Nations UN 0012
UN 0012 defines the category 'Cartridges for weapons, inert projectile or Cartridges, small arms', being "Ammunition consisting of a cartridge case fitted with a centre or rimfire primer and containing both a propelling charge and solid projectiles. They are designed to be fired in weapons of calibre not larger than 19.1 mm. Shotgun cartridges of any calibre are included in this definition."

United Nations UN 0014
UN 0014 defines the category 'Cartridges for weapons, blank or Cartridges, small arms, blank'

== See also ==
- Airport security – Measures to prevent crime at an airport
- European Firearms Pass
- Firearms license – License that allows the licensee to buy, own, possess, or carry a firearm
