= Handloading =

Manual assembly of ammunition

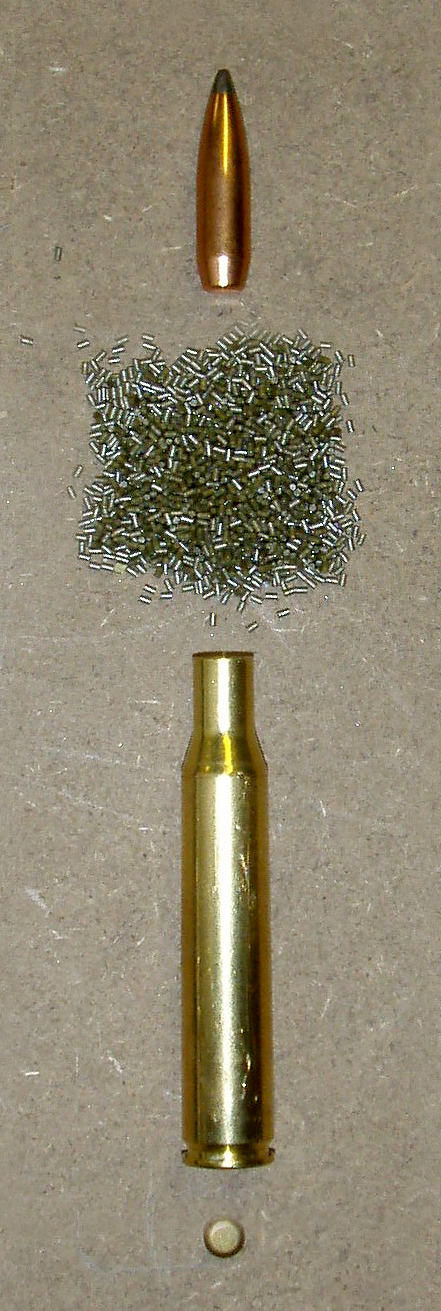
Components of a modern bottleneck rifle cartridge. Top-to-bottom: Copper-jacketed bullet, smokeless powder granules, rimless brass case, Boxer primer.

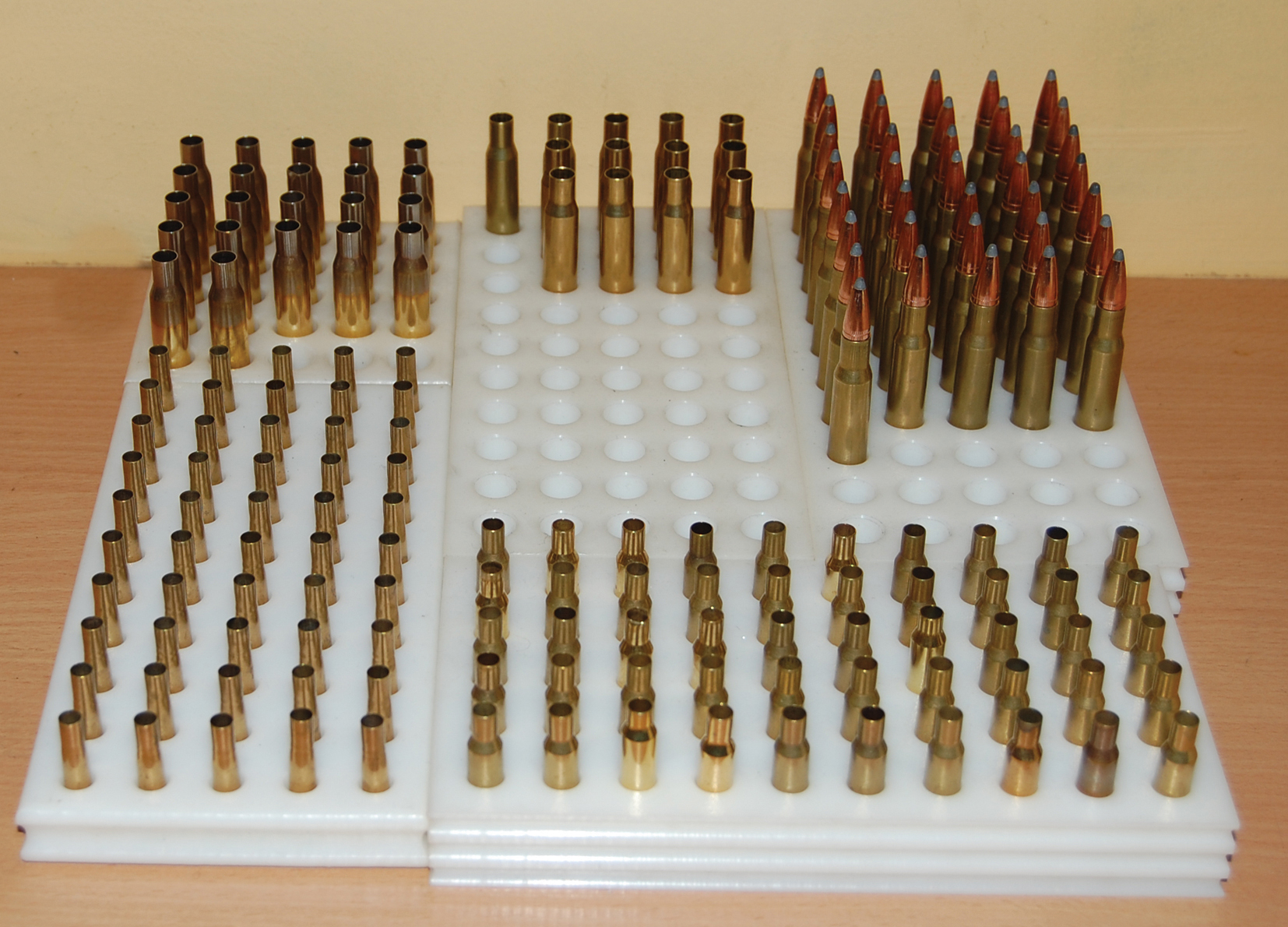
Slotted trays or "loading blocks" that hold empty cases awaiting handloading and completed cartridges (top right area)

Handloading is the practice of making firearm cartridges by manually assembling the individual components (metallic/polymer case, primer, propellant and projectile), rather than purchasing mass-produced, factory-loaded commercial ammunition. Handloading using previously fired cartridge cases or shotshells is called reloading (should not be confused with the reloading of a firearm with cartridges, such as by swapping detachable magazines, or using a stripper clip or speedloader to quickly insert new cartridges into a magazine). While the root "loading" refers to the filling of muzzle loading firearms with propellant (originally with black gunpowder or less commonly smokeless powder) and a bullet, most of the actual handloading process involves the cartridge case and its preparation. Unlike the propellant, primer and projectile (bullets, shot and slugs), which are all single-use consumables, the case is the only reusable component and its shape, internal capacity and crimping tension are crucial factors influencing the internal ballistics of the cartridge.

The term handloading is the more technical term that refers generically to any manual assembly of ammunition cartridges, although reloading is often used interchangeably since handloading more often than not involves used cases and the loading techniques are largely the same regardless whether the cases are brand new or having been previously fired (used). The only differences lie in the initial preparations — new cases are generally ready for loading straight out of the box, while previously fired cases often need additional procedures to prepare them for loading. This can include basic operations such as removal of expended primers ("depriming"), case cleaning (with water, ultrasound or abrasive media to remove fouling and/or corrosion residue) and/or burnishing/polishing, deburring and resizing to return the case to its pre-fired shape or to reform from fire forming or to experiment with custom modifications (wildcatting), trimming the cases to length, or more advanced operations such as reshaping (to correct any pre-existing deformations, or for caliber conversion).

There are also other informal terms that describe specific situations of handloading, such as hot loading (filling the case with more propellant charges than recommended) and underloading (filling with less propellant than recommended), the former often in "wildcat" experiments (and can be potentially dangerous due to excessive pressure), and the latter often in the production of blanks and less-lethal cartridges with wax/rubber/plastic projectiles and can result in squib loads. Dummy rounds are also made via handloading techniques by completely skipping the propellant loading, primer installation and by marking the cartridge (usually by drilling holes in the case or using specific colors).

Handloading is a popular practice among shooting sport enthusiasts, especially those involved in precision-focused benchrest or long-range shooting. It is a method of accurizing that involves trial-and-error experiments with different combinations of projectile (different weights and profiles), propellant quantity, propellant types/brands, seating depth and whether to crimp the bullet or not. These changes are done one at a time because changing more than one variable at a time is usually self defeating. Each cartridge combination (known as a load) is then field-tested with a chosen firearm (usually the gun the load is intended for) and fine tuned (again by changing one variable at a time) until a combination with minimal variations in muzzle velocities (measured with chronographs) and the smallest shot grouping is achieved. Best practices dictate that the reloader keep all load and performance data so loads can be readily reproduced in the future as well as not repeating previous, less than optimal, loads. Also, all reloaded ammunition is to be labeled with all data to avoid confusion in the future.

== Advantages ==
Some consider handloading cartridges or shotshells a hobby, but reloading can save the shooter money, providing a greater quantity of higher quality ammunition within a given budget. However, hobbyists' enjoyment of the reloading process may be a significant benefit.

=== Economy ===
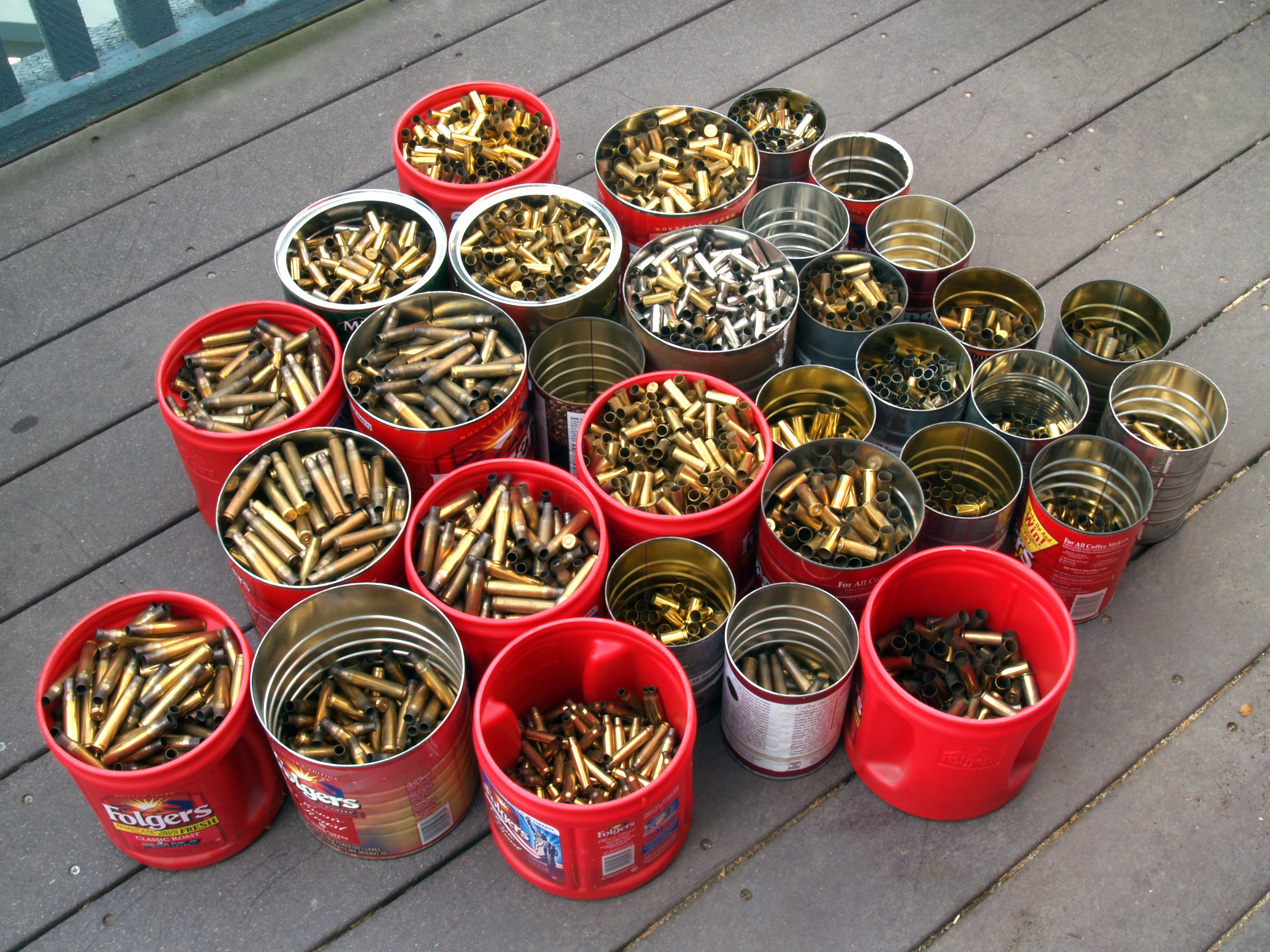
Spent brass cases of various sizes being collected in buckets for recycled uses

Handloading ammunition avoids the labor costs of commercial production lines, reducing the expenditure to only the cost of purchasing components and equipment. Reloading may not be cost effective for occasional shooters, as it takes time to recoup the cost of needed equipment, but those who shoot more frequently will see cost-savings over time, as the brass cartridge cases and shotgun shell hulls, which are often the most expensive components, can be reused with proper maintenance.

=== Improved ballistic performance ===
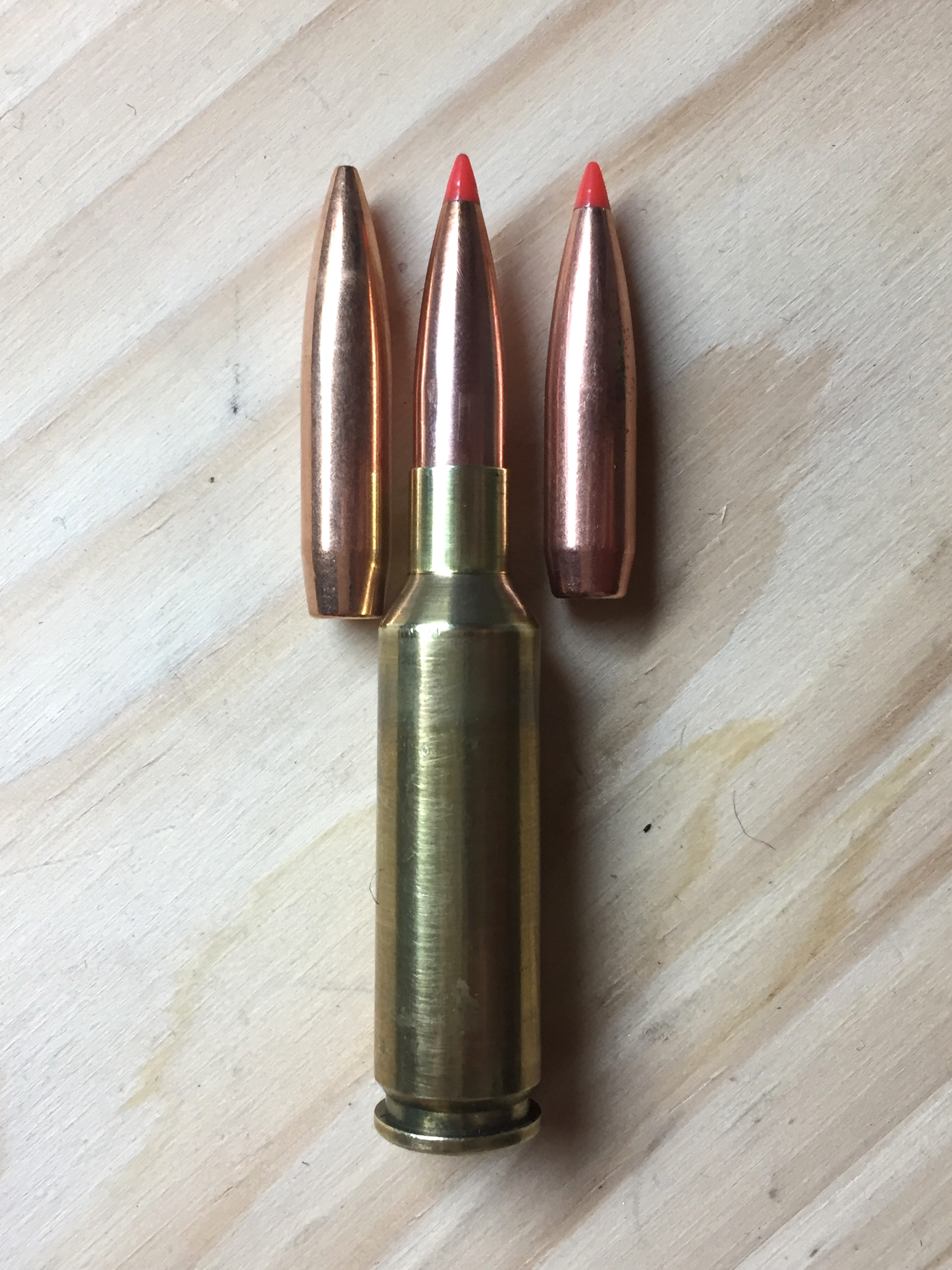
A 6.5×47mm Lapua cartridge with Hornady A-Max plastic-tipped bullet (center and right), whose plastic nose cone allows the same external ballistics as a FMJ bullet (left) while retaining the hollow point's terminal expansion

There are three aspects to ballistics: internal ballistics, external ballistics, and terminal ballistics. Internal ballistics refers to things that happen inside the firearm during and after firing, but before the bullet leaves the muzzle. The handloading process can realize increased accuracy and precision through improved consistency of manufacture, by selecting the optimal bullet weight and design, and tailoring bullet velocity to the purpose. Each cartridge reloaded can have each component carefully matched to the rest of the cartridges in the batch. Brass cases can be matched by volume, weight, and concentricity, bullets by weight and design, powder charges by weight, type, case filling (amount of total usable case capacity filled by charge), and packing scheme (characteristics of granule packing).

Handloading is a fundamental prerequisite for success where the most extreme accuracy is demanded, such as in rifle benchrest shooting, but can only be done consistently accurately following load development to determine what cartridge components work best with a specific rifle.

Customized performance is a common goal of handloaders. Hunters may desire cartridges with specialized bullets with specific terminal performance. Target shooters often experiment extensively with component combinations in an effort to achieve the best and most consistent bullet trajectories, often using cartridge cases that have been fire formed in order to best fit the chamber of a specific firearm. Shotgun shooters can make specialty rounds unavailable through commercial inventories at any price. Some handloaders even customize cartridges and shotshells to reduce recoil for shooters who might otherwise avoid shooting sports because of the high recoil of certain firearms. Some handloaders make increased-power ammunition (i.e. "hot loads") if higher muzzle velocities (hence flatter trajectories) are desired.

=== More versatility over commercial ammunition ===
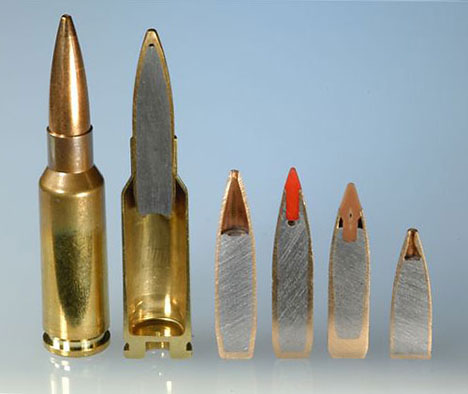
6.5mm Grendel with different projectile options: (from left) 123 gr Lapua Scenar (open-tip), 144 gr Lapua FMJ, 123 gr Lapua Scenar (same as previous, but sectioned), 129 gr Hornady SST (polymer tip), 120 gr Nosler (polymer tip), and 90 gr TNT (Speer, open-tip)

The equipment used to assemble the cartridge has an effect on its uniformity/consistency and optimal shape/size. Dies used to size the cartridges can be matched to the chamber of a given gun. Modern handloading equipment enables a firearm owner to tailor fresh ammunition to a specific firearm, and to precisely measured tolerances far improving the comparatively wide tolerances within which commercial ammunition manufacturers must operate.

Recurring shortages of commercial ammunition are also reasons to reload cartridges and shotshells. Store-bought ammunition may be unavailable when commercial supplies are exhausted, but having the ability to reload one's own cartridges and shotshells allows continue shooting despite shortages.

Handloaders can also experiment with resizing and create newer-specification cartridges for which no commercial equivalent has ever existed — so-called wildcat cartridges, some of which can eventually acquire mainstream acceptance if the ballistic performance is proven to be good enough. Once the new cartridge has achieved widespread market adoption, handloading components can also be acquired at discounted prices when purchased in bulk. Examples of such cartridges include the .22-250, 6mm PPC, 7mm-08 and .260 Remington. Some cartridges initially purely designed for handloaded target shooting, such as the 6.5mm Creedmoor and the 6.5mm Grendel, have not only gained mainstream acceptance in the civilian market but also partial adoption by regular military.

Ammunition for special uses can also be loaded including; For new or recoil sensitive shooters, reduced pressure loads can be assembled. These loads allow for less flinch inducing recoil. Handoading also enables hunters to use the same rifle and caliber to hunt a greater diversity of game. For instance, in the same cartridge/rifle combination, using a light for caliber bullet for varmint and heavy for caliber for large game. Collectors of rare, antique and foreign-made firearms must often turn to handloading because the appropriate cartridges and shotshells are no longer commercially available.

== Components ==
The following components are needed for handloading ammunition:

- Cases or shotshells. Steel and aluminum cases do not have the correct qualities for reloading, so a brass case is essential (although nickel-plated brass cases, while not as reformable as plain brass, can also be reloaded). For shotshells, plastic or paper cases can be reloaded, though plastic is more durable.
- Propellant of an appropriate type. Generally, handgun cartridges (due to shorter barrels) and shotshells (due to heavier projectile weights) use faster-burning propellants, and rifle cartridges use slower-burning powder. The powder is generally the nitrocellulose-based smokeless powder in modern cartridges, although on occasion the older black powder or "gunpowder" may be used.
- Projectiles, such as bullets for handguns and rifles, or shots or slugs (both contained in a wad) for shotguns.
- Primers, most commonly a Boxer-type centerfire primer.

Case lubrication may also be needed depending on the dies used. Carbide pistol dies do not require case lubricant. For this reason, they are preferred by many, being inherently less messy in operation. In contrast, all dies for bottleneck cartridges, whether made of high-strength steel or carbide, and steel dies for pistols do require the use of a case lubricant to prevent a case become stuck in a die. (In the event that a case does ever become stuck in a die, there are stuck case remover tools that are available to remove a stuck case from the die, albeit at the loss of the particular case that became stuck.) Powder should always be stored in original containers since they are designed to split open at low pressure to prevent a dangerous pressure buildup, and any cabinet they are stored in should similarly prevent pressure buildup by allowing venting and expansion.

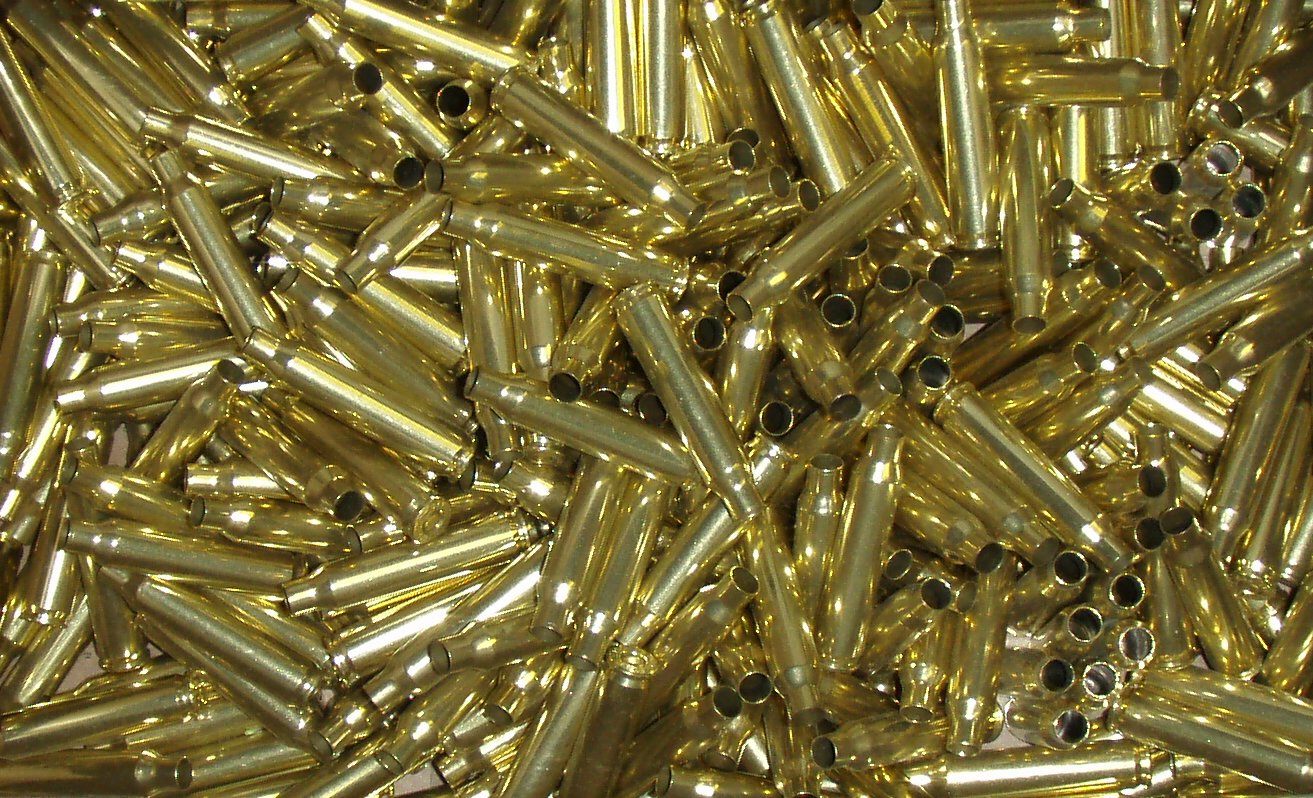
Winchester-branded .223 Remington brass cases sold in bulk

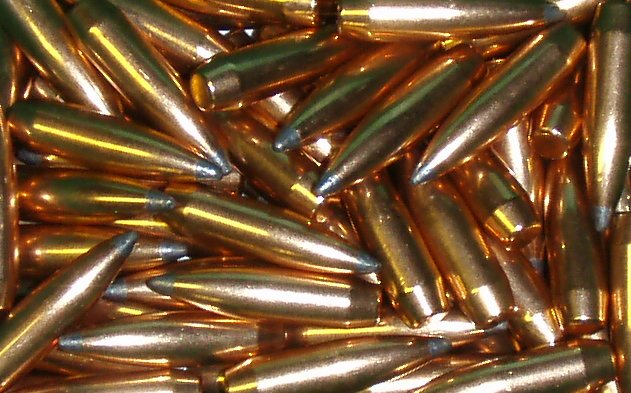
.270 caliber Sierra SBT GameKing soft-point bullets

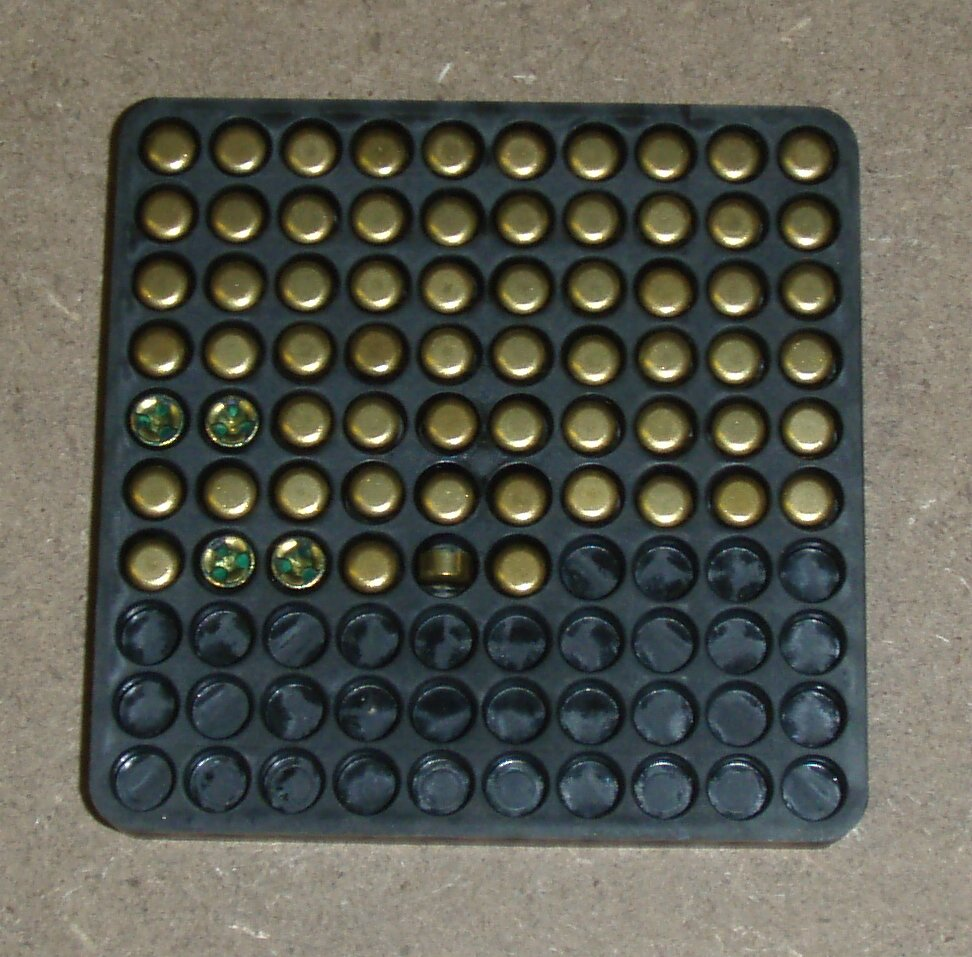
Large rifle primers (Boxer type)

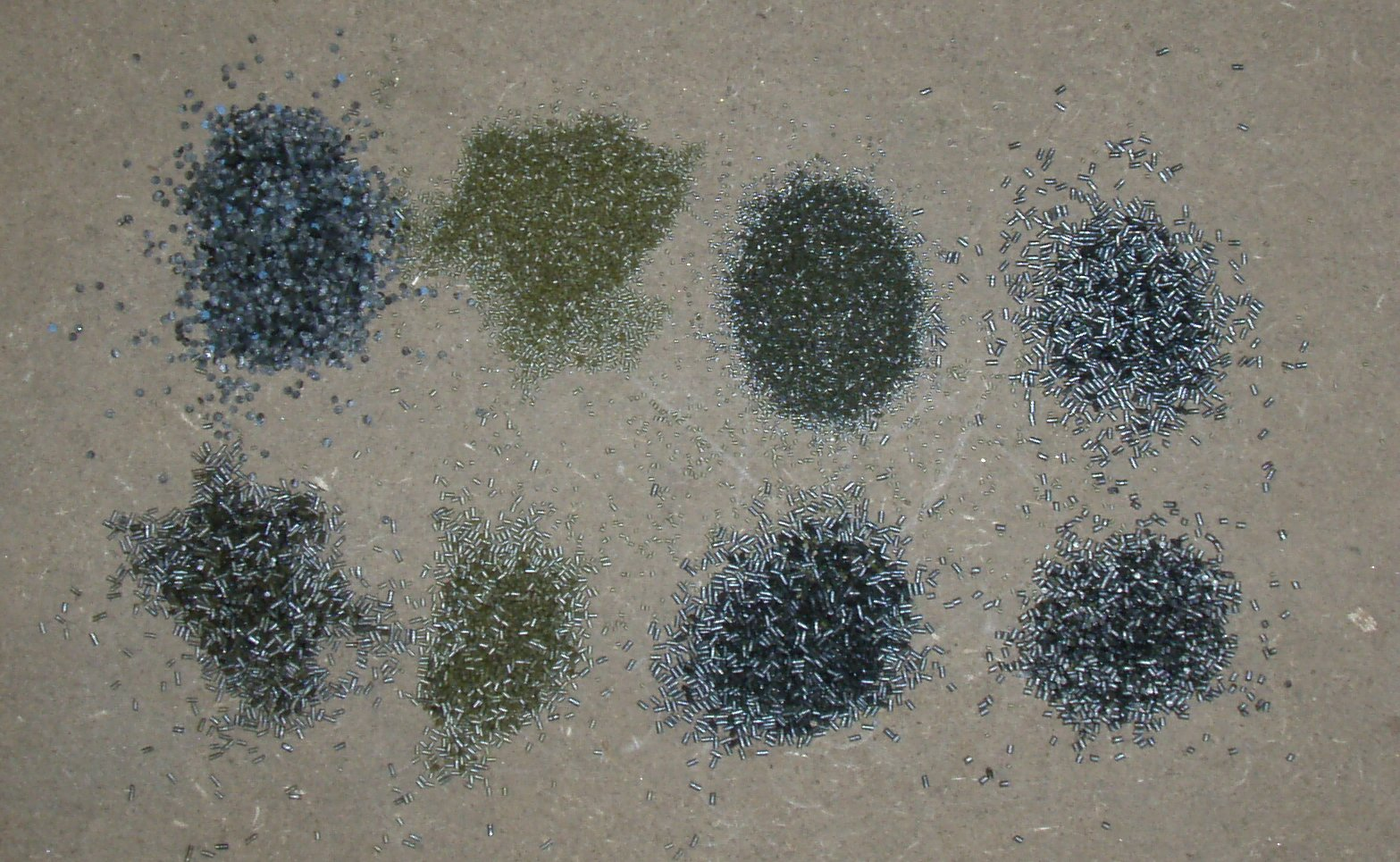
Different samples of propellant powder

== Equipment ==
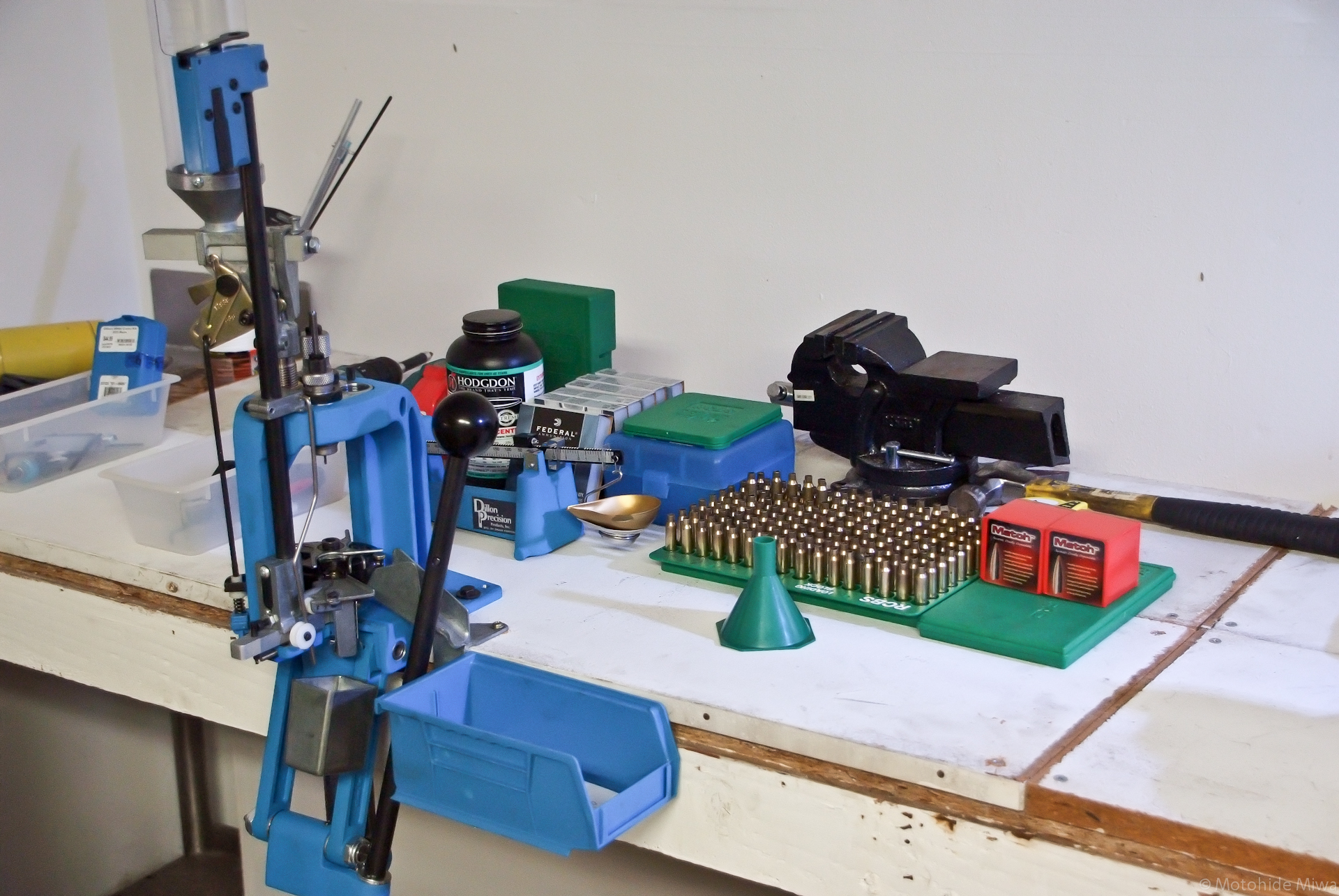
Standard setup of a handloading workbench

Inexpensive "tong" tools have been used for reloading since the mid-19th century. They resemble a large pair of pliers and can be caliber-specific or have interchangeable dies. However, modern handloading equipment can be sophisticated tools that emphasize precision and reliability. There are also a myriad of various measuring tools and accessory products on the market for use in conjunction with handloading.

=== Presses ===
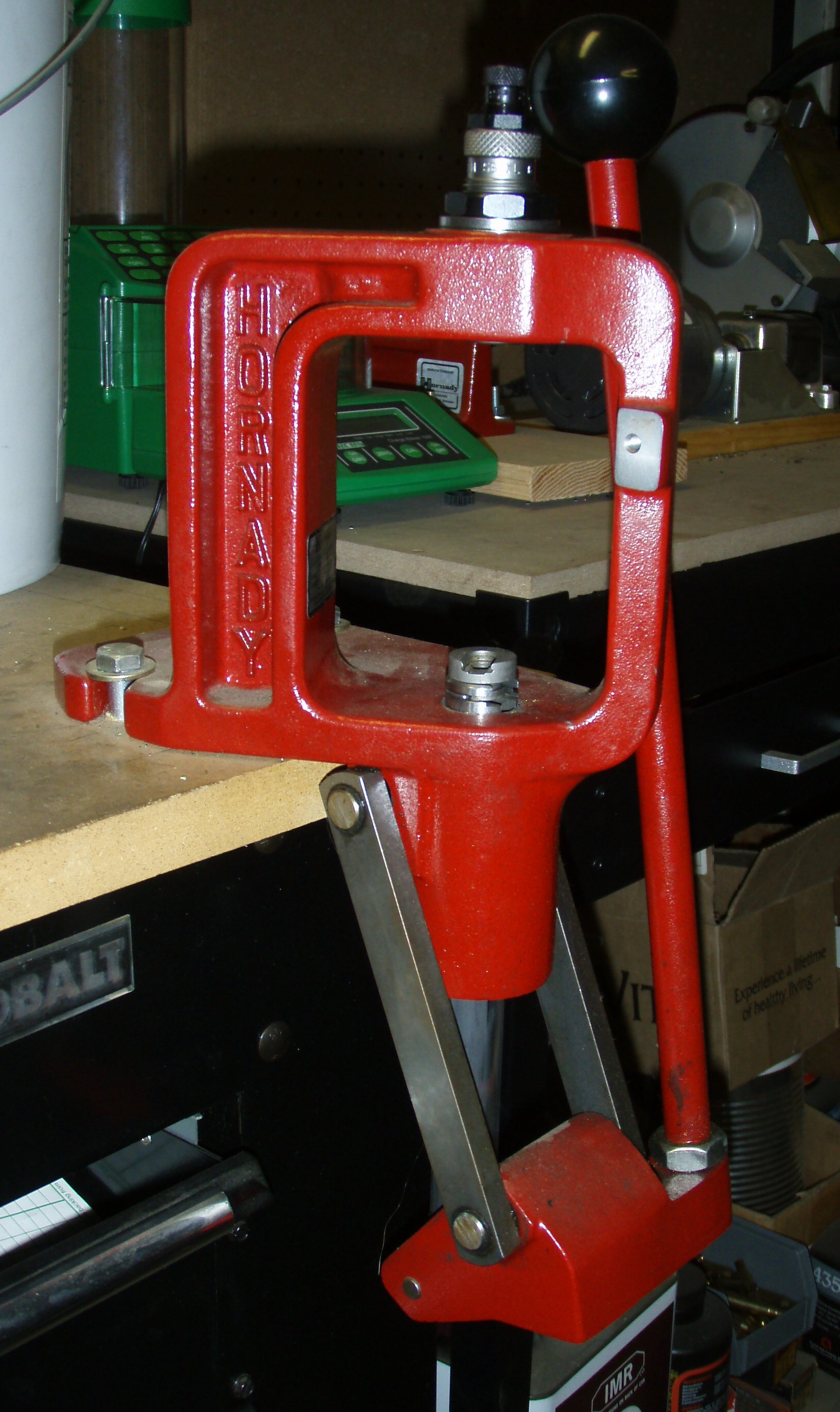
Hornady single-stage reloading press ("O" frame) with die

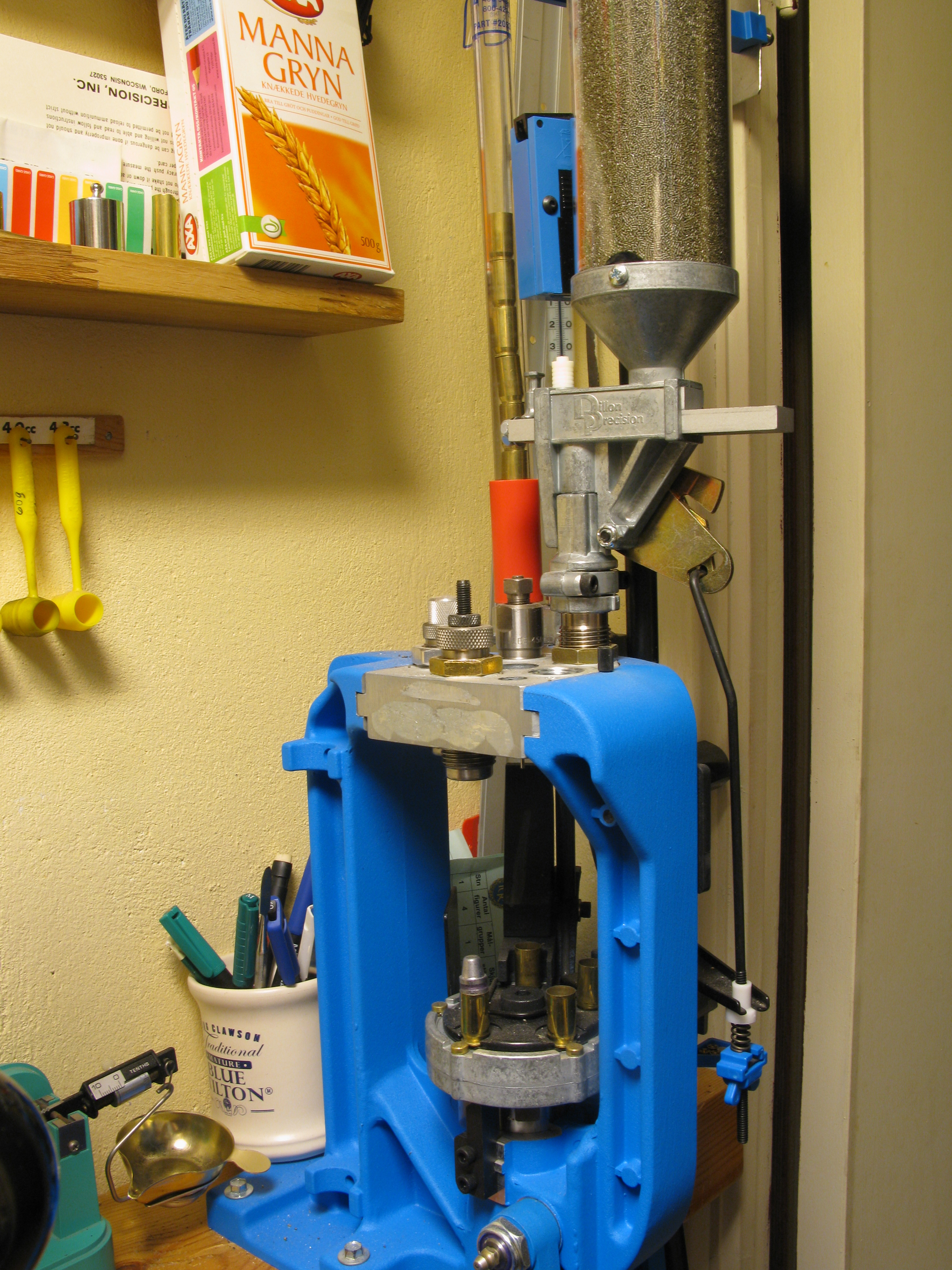
A Dillon progressive press

The quintessential handloading equipment is the press, which uses compound leverage to push the cases into a die that performs the loading operations. Presses vary from simple, inexpensive single-stage models, to complex "progressive" models that can perform multiple operations with each pull of the lever, like an assembly line, at rates exceeding 500 rounds per hour.

Loading presses are often categorized by the letter of the English alphabet that they most resemble in shape: "O", "C", and "H". The sturdiest presses, suitable for bullet swaging functions as well as for normal reloading die usage, are of the "O" type, which has a frame that completely encloses the die mechanism. The "C" frame, usually a less sturdy press, is suitable for most handloading operations other than bullet swaging. Iron, steel and aluminum construction are seen with all presses. Some users prefer "C" style presses over "O" presses, as access to the operational area is much more open. Shotshell style presses, intended for non-batch use, for which each shotshell or cartridge is cycled through the dies before commencing onto the next shotshell or cartridge to be reloaded, commonly resemble the letter "H".

Single-stage press, generally of the "O" or "C" type, is the simplest of press designs. These presses can only hold one die and perform a single procedure on a single case at any time. Each operation, resize, deprime, bullet seating, bullet crimping, etc., requires the user to change the dies or setup. When using a single-stage press, cases are loaded in batches, one step for each cartridge per batch at a time. The batch sizes are usually kept small, usually 100 cases or less at a time. Single-stage presses are commonly used for high-precision rifle cartridge handloading, but may be used for almost any reloading operation. Single stage presses are also popular for load development prior to producing large numbers of cartridges on a progressive press.

Turret presses, most commonly of the "C" type, are similar to a single-stage press, but have a mounting disc (also called a die head) that indexes at each die position. This allows multiple dies to be mounted to the machine and quickly rotated into position. Batch operations are performed similar to a single-stage press, different procedures can be performed by simply rotating the turret to place the appropriate die into position. Although turret presses operate much like single-stage presses, they eliminate much of the setup time required by removing and installing individual dies. There are also automatic indexing turret presses which rotate the turret one position with each pull of the handle. These presses allow the user to quickly change caliber by swapping die heads (turrets) and produce one complete round with 3-6 pulls of the handle.

Progressive presses are far more complex in design and operation and initial setup usually takes longer. However, the benefit is increased output. Progressives can handle several cases at once. These presses have a rotating shell holder/plate that indexes at each individual station with each pull of the lever. Progressives can hold 3 or more dies in interchangeable toolhead assemblies. The toolhead assembly allows the user to quickly change calibers with minimal readjustment of the dies. The dies, and sometimes loading modules (which can include case hopper/feeder, primer feeder, powder measure and/or bullet feeder), are mounted to be in alignment with the corresponding index position on the shell holder/plate. Progressives can have 4 or more stations, extra stations allow for the addition of optional equipment such as a powder level checkers. Progressive presses can load hundreds of cartridges an hour with their streamlined efficiency. All the user has to do is pull the lever to produce one finished round per stroke.

==== Shotshell presses ====
Shotshell presses are generally a single unit of the "H" configuration that handles all functions, dedicated to reloading just one gauge of shotshell. Shotshell reloading is similar to cartridge reloading, except that, instead of a bullet, a wad and a measure of shot are used, and after loading the shot, the shell is crimped shut. Both 6 and 8 fold crimps are in use, for paper hulls and plastic hulls. Roll crimps can be used for metallic, paper, and plastic hulls. The shotshell loader contains stations to resize and deprime the hull, reprime the hull, measure powder, insert the wad, measure shot, and crimp the shell.

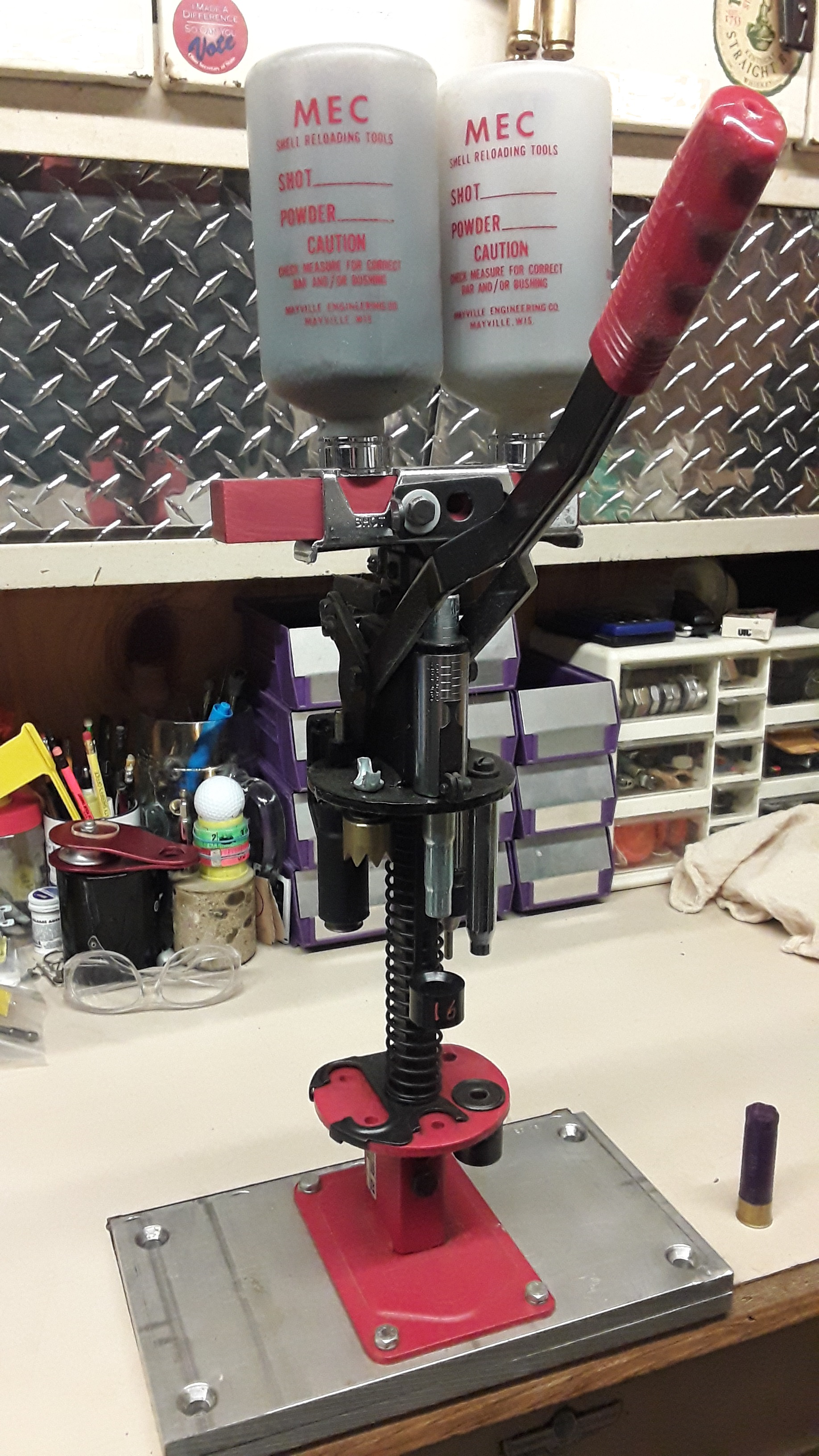
MEC 600 Jr Mark V shotgun reloading press

Due to the low cost of modern plastic shotshells, and the additional complexity of reloading fired shells, shotshell handloading is not as popular as cartridge handloading. For example, unlike when handloading rifle and pistol cartridges, where some of the various components (cases and bullets of the same weight) from different manufacturers are usually interchangeable, shotshell loads are usually restricted to using only the particular brand or design of shotshell hull, a specific brand/style of wad or shot column components, primer and powder that are called for in the recipe. Substitution of components is not considered safe, as changing just one component, such as a brand of primer, can increase pressures by as much as 3500 PSI, which may exceed SAAMI pressure limits. Reloading shotshells is therefore more along the lines of precisely following a recipe with non-fungible components.

Where shotshell reloading remains popular is for making specialized shotgun shells, such as for providing lowered recoil, for achieving better shot patterns, to make low-cost "poppers" (blanks) used to acclimate hunting dogs to the sound of gunfire without actually shooting projectiles or to manufacture obsolete shotshells that are no longer commercially manufactured. Handloading also allows the loader to make other improvements or features not available in commercially loaded shotshells.

Metallic reloading presses are not usually dedicated to reloading a single caliber of cartridge, although they can be, but are designed to allow for reloading various cartridge calibers through changing the dies. In contrast, shotshell presses are most often configured for reloading just one gauge of shotshell, e.g., 12 gauge, and are rarely, if ever, reconfigured for reloading other gauges of shotshells, as the cost of tooling and time to switch gauges on a shotshell press often exceeds the cost of buying a new shotshell press outright, as shotshell presses typically come from the factory already set up to reload one gauge or bore of shotshell. Hence, it is common to use a dedicated shotshell press for reloading each gauge or bore of shotshell used.

The price of shot for reloading shotshells over the last several years has also risen significantly, such that lead shot that was readily available for around $0.50/lb. (c. 2005) now reaches $2.00 per pound (2013.) Due to this large increase in the price of lead shot, the economy of reloading 12 gauge shotshells vs. just using promotional (low-cost) 12 gauge shotshells only starts to make economic sense for higher volume shooters, who may shoot more than 50,000 rounds a year. In contrast, the reloading of shotshells that are usually not available in low-cost, promotional pricings, such as .410 bore, 12 ga. slugs, 16 ga, 20 ga., and 28 ga., becomes more economical to reload in much smaller quantities, perhaps within only 3-5 boxes of shells per year. Reloading .410 bore, 12 ga. slugs, 16 ga., 20 ga, and 28 ga. shells, therefore, remains relatively common, more so than the reloading of 12 gauge shotshells, for which promotional shotshells are usually readily available from many retailers. These smaller bore and gauge shotshells also require much less lead shot, further lessening the effect of the rapid rises seen in the price of lead shot. The industry change to steel shot, arising from the US and Canadian Federal bans on using lead shotshells while hunting migratory wildfowl, has also affected reloading shotshells, as the shot bar and powder bushing required on a dedicated shotshell press also must be changed for each hull type reloaded, and are different than what would be used for reloading shotshells with lead shot, further complicating the reloading of shotshells.

With the recent rampant rise in lead shot prices, though, a major change in handloading shotshells has also occurred. Namely, a transition among high volume 12 gauge shooters from loading traditional 1-1/8 oz. shot loads to 7/8 oz. shot loads or even 24 gm. (so-called International) shot loads have occurred. At 1-1/8 oz. per shotshell, a 25 lb. bag of lead shot can only reload approximately 355 shotshells. At 7/8 oz. per shotshell, a 25 lb. of lead shot can reload 457 shotshells. At 24 grams per shotshell, a 25 lb of lead shot can reload approximately 472 shotshells. Stretching the number of hulls that it is possible to reload from an industry-standard 25 lb. bag of lead shot by 117 shells has significantly helped mitigate the large increase in the price of lead shot. That this change has also resulted in minimal changes to scores in shooting sports such as skeet and trap has only expedited the switch among high volume shooters to shooting 24 gm. shotshells with their lesser amounts of shot.

With the recent shortages over 2012–2013 of 12 gauge shotshells in the United States (among all other types of rifle and pistol ammunition), the popularity of reloading 12 gauge shotshells has seen a widespread resurgence. Field use of the International 24 gm. 12 gauge shells has proven them to be effective on small game, while stretching the number of reloads possible from a bag of shot, and they have subsequently become popular for hunting small game. Since shot shells are typically reloaded at least 5 times, although upwards of 15 times are often possible for lightly loaded shells, this transition to field use of 24 gm. loads has helped mitigate ammunition shortages for hunters.

Shotshell presses typically use a charge bar to drop precise amounts of shot and powder. Most commonly, these charge bars are fixed in their capacities, with a single charge bar rated at, say, 1-1/8 oz. of lead shot, with a switchable powder bushing that permits dropping precisely measured fixed amounts of different types of powder repetitively (e.g., MEC.) On the other hand, some charge bars are drilled to accept bushings for dropping different fixed amounts of both shot and powder (e.g. Texan.) For the ultimate in flexibility, though, universal charge bars with micrometers dropping fixed volumes of powder and shot are also available; these are able to select differing fixed amounts of both powder and shot, and are popular for handloaders who load more than just a few published recipes, or, especially, among those who wish to experiment with numerous different published recipes. Fixed charge bars are rated for either lead or steel shot, but not for both. Universal charge bars, on the other hand, are capable of reloading both lead and steel shot, being adjustable.

Like their pistol and rifle counterparts, shotshell presses are available in both single-stage and progressive varieties. For shooters shooting fewer than approximately 500 shells a month, and especially shooting fewer than 100 shells a month, a single-stage press is often found to be adequate. For shooters shooting larger numbers of shells a month, progressive presses are often chosen. A single-stage press can typically reload 100 hulls in approximately an hour. Progressive presses can typically reload upwards of 400 or 500 hulls an hour.

Shotshell presses are most commonly operated in non-batch modes. That is, a single hull will often be deprimed, reshaped, primed, loaded with powder, have a wad pressed in, be loaded with shot, be pre-crimped, and then be final crimped before being removed and a new hull being placed on the shotshell press at station 1. An alternative, somewhat faster method, often used on a single stage press is to work on 5 hulls in parallel sequentially, with but a single processed hull being located at each of the 5 stations available on a single stage shotshell press, while manually removing the finished shotshell from station 5 and then moving the 4 in-process hulls to the next station (1 to 2, 2 to 3, 3 to 4, 4 to 5) before adding a new hull at the deprimer (station 1) location. Both these modes of shotshell reloading are in distinct contrast to the common practice used with reloading pistol and rifle cartridges on a single-stage press, which is most often processed in batch modes, where a common operation will commonly be done on a batch of up to 50 or 100 cartridges at a time, before proceeding to the next processing step. This difference is largely a result of shotshell presses having 5 stations available for use simultaneously, unlike a single-stage cartridge press which typically has but one station available for use.

In general, though, shotshell reloading is far more complex than rifle and pistol cartridge reloading, and hence far fewer shotshell presses are therefore used relative to rifle and pistol cartridge reloading presses.

==== .50 BMG and larger cartridge presses ====
Reloading presses for reloading .50 BMG and larger cartridges are also typically caliber-specific, much like shotshell presses, as standard-size rifle and pistol reloading presses are not capable of being pressed into such exotic reloading service. The reloading of such large cartridges is also much more complex, as developing a load using a specific lot of powder can require nearly all of a 5 lb. bottle of powder and a load must be developed with a single load of powder for reasons of safety.

=== Dies ===
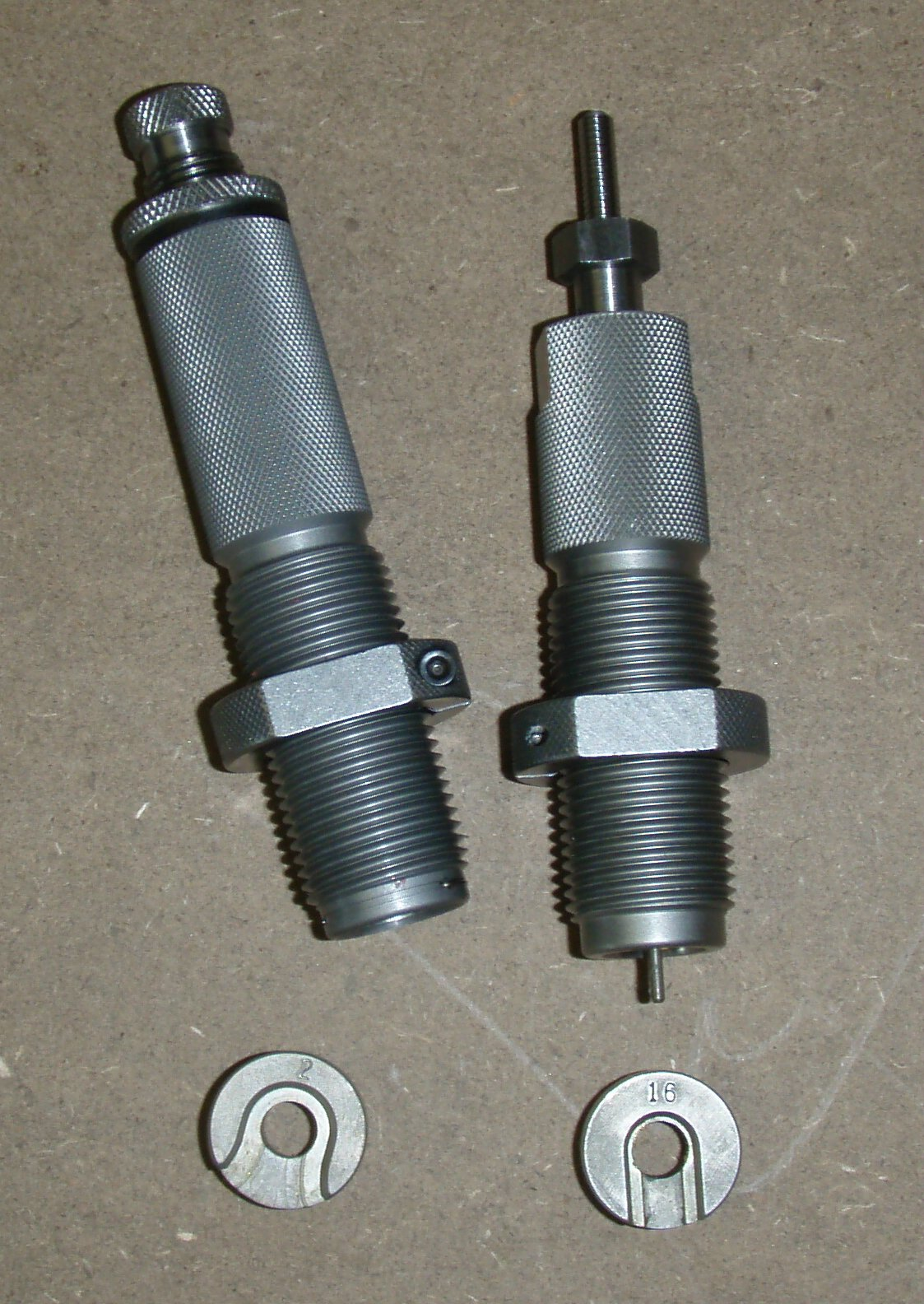
Reloading dies and shell holders for 7.5mm Swiss

Dies are generally sold in sets of two, three or four units, depending on the type and shape of the case. A three-die set is needed for straight cases, while a two-die set is used for bottlenecked cases. The first die of either set performs the sizing and decapping operation, except in some cases in the 3-die set, where decapping may be done by the second die. The middle die in a three-die set is used to flare the case mouth as well as allows powder to be added to the case (and decap in the case where this is not done by the first die), while in a two-die set the entire neck is expanded as the case is extracted from the first die. The second or third die in the set seats the bullet and may apply a crimp. A fourth die is often used to apply crimps after the bullet is seated. Sometimes an additional "die" is used to mount powder measures which makes dispensing powder into the case a part of the process. This die usually flares the case mouth to allow easier bullet insertion.

Standard dies are made from hardened steel, and require that the case be lubricated for the resizing operation, which requires a large amount of force. Bottleneck and longer straight cartridges require lubrication of every case, due to the large amount of force required, while shorter straight wall cartridges (9mm or .45ACP for example) can get away with alternating lubricated and unlubricated cases. Carbide dies have a ring of tungsten carbide, which is far harder and slicker than tool steel, carbide straight wall dies do not require lubrication, however bottle neck dies do.

Modern reloading dies are generally standardized with 7/8-14 (or, for the case of .50 BMG dies, with 1-1/4×12) threads and are interchangeable with all common brands of presses, although older dies may use other threads and be press-specific.

==== Crimping dies ====
Sometimes die sets include a separate die for crimping and this is done as an extra operation. There are two types of crimp, roll and taper. Crimping is required for several reasons such as autoloading firearms, firearms with a tubular magazine or pistols with massive recoil (.500 S&W), where the cycling or recoil of the firearm may cause the bullet to move in the case, resulting in poor accuracy, increased pressures or malfunctions. Some reloaders will only crimp only if absolutely necessary.

Roll crimping is usually appropriate for everything except cartridges that headspace on the case mouth (I.E. 9MM and .45ACP). Magnum straight wall and bottleneck cartridges ar usually roll crimped. Bullets that require roll crimping usually have a cannelure on the bullet, this prevents bullet deformation when crimping.

Cases which headspace on the case mouth, on the other hand, require a taper crimp, because they require a flat surface at the case mouth; roll crimping will cause headspacing problems on these cartridges.

==== Special dies ====
There are also specialty dies. Bump dies are designed to move the shoulder of a bottleneck case back just a bit to facilitate chambering. These are frequently used in conjunction with neck dies, as the bump die itself does not manipulate the neck of the case whatsoever. A bump die can be a very useful tool to anyone who owns a fine shooting rifle with a chamber that is cut to minimum headspace dimensions, as the die allows the case to be fitted to this unique chamber. Another die is the "hand die". A hand die has no threads and is operated—as the name suggests—by hand or by use of a hand-operated arbor press. Hand dies are available for most popular cartridges, and although available as full-length resizing dies, they are most commonly seen as neck sizing dies. These use an interchangeable insert to size the neck, and these inserts come in 1/1000-inch steps so that the user can custom fit the neck of the case to his own chamber or have greater control over neck tension on the bullet.

=== Shellholders ===
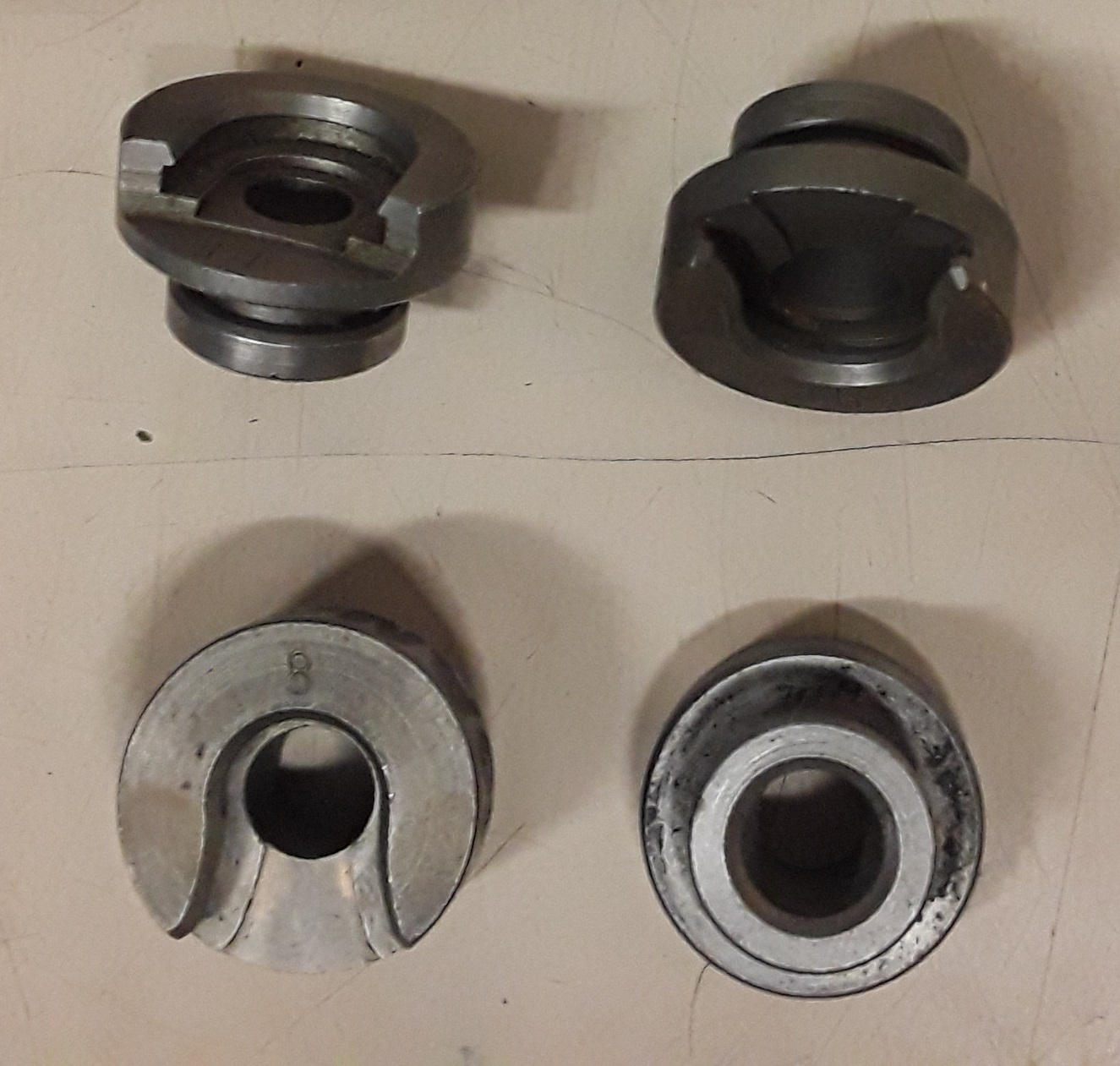
Different views of a standard type of shell holder.

A shell holder, generally sold separately, is needed to hold the case in place as it is forced into and out of the dies. The reason shellholders are sold separately is that many cartridges share the same base dimensions, and a single shell holder can service many different cases. While most modern single stage presses use a standard shell holder some older presses may need special holders.

Progressive presses, however, may use shell holders specific to the press manufacturer, and will generally only fit a certain make and model of reloading press. A different type of shell holder is also required for use with some hand priming tools (e.g., Lee Autoprime tool) as well as trimming tools.

=== Case cleaning ===
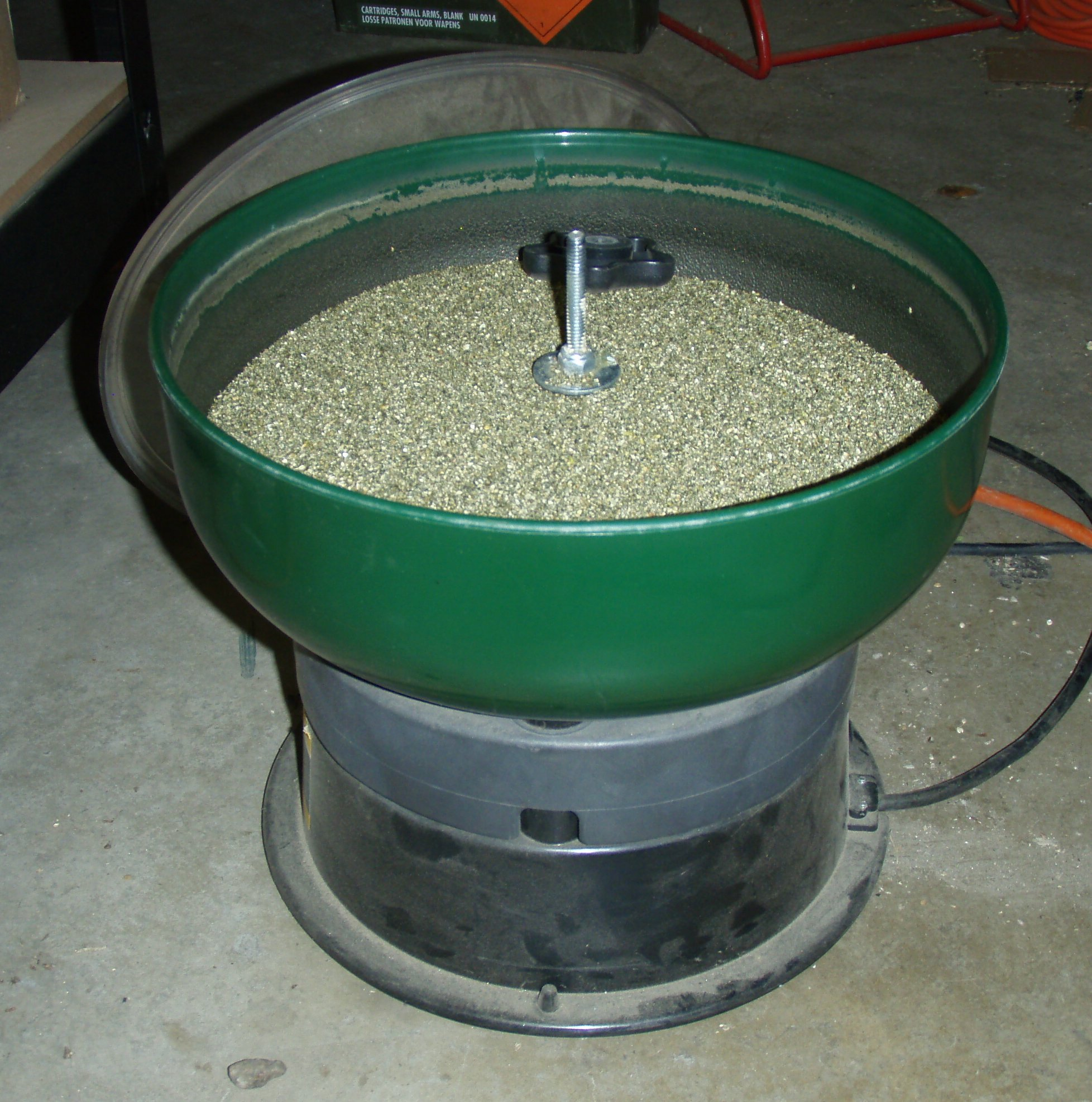
A vibratory ("dry") case tumbler

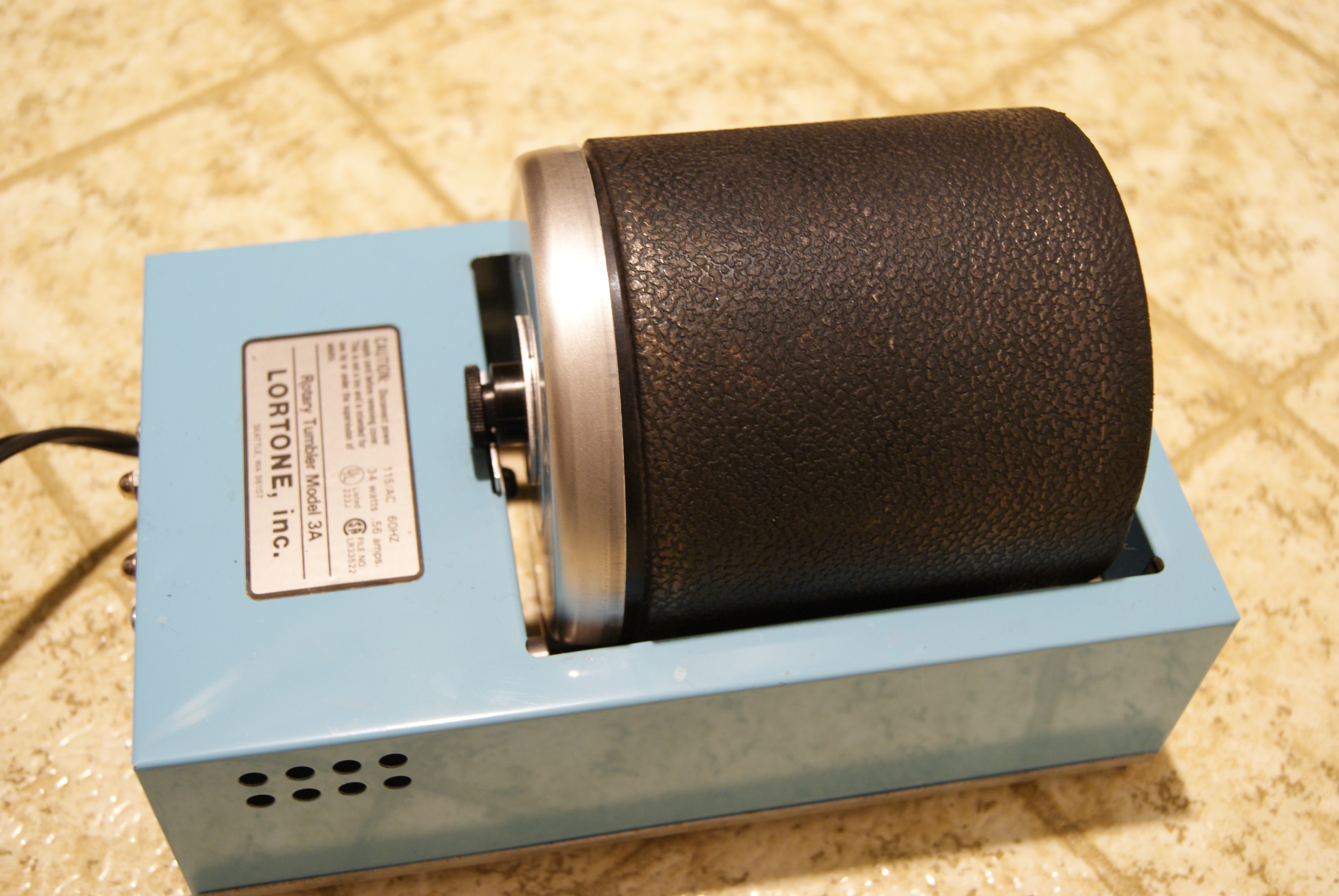
A rotary ("wet") case tumbler

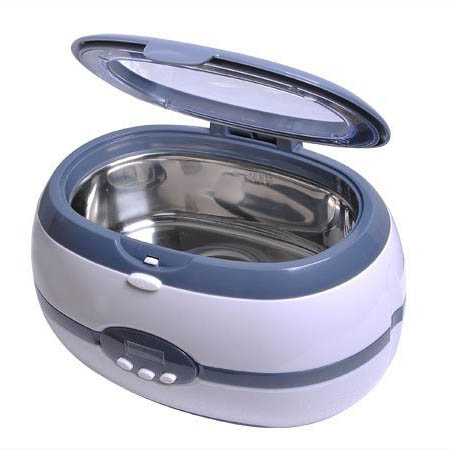
An ultrasonic cleaner

Case cleaning is needed if the cartridge cases used are recycled from previous firings, and is done mainly to remove internal fouling as well as to polish the case exterior for a more cosmetically pleasing finish. It can be done with an ultrasonic cleaner, or more commonly with a mass finishing device known as a case tumbler. Case tumblers use abrasive granules known as tumbling media (which can be stone or ceramic granules, fragments of corncob or walnut/coconut shells, or small segments of stainless steel wire often called "pins") to burnish the cases, and can be either a vibratory type ("dry tumbling"), which resembles a hot pot; or a water/detergent-based rotary type ("wet tumbling"), which resembles the drum of a front-loading washing machine. In either type, when the cleaning is completed, a "media separator" is needed to sieve out and remove the abrasive media. In the "wet" rotary tumbling, a food dehydrator-like convection dryer is sometimes used to eliminate moisture retention that might later interfere with handloading. Cases should be inspected both before and after cleaning and any cases with serious problems (corrosion, case head sepparation, torn rims, split necks, etc.) should be discarded.

==== Primer pocket tools ====
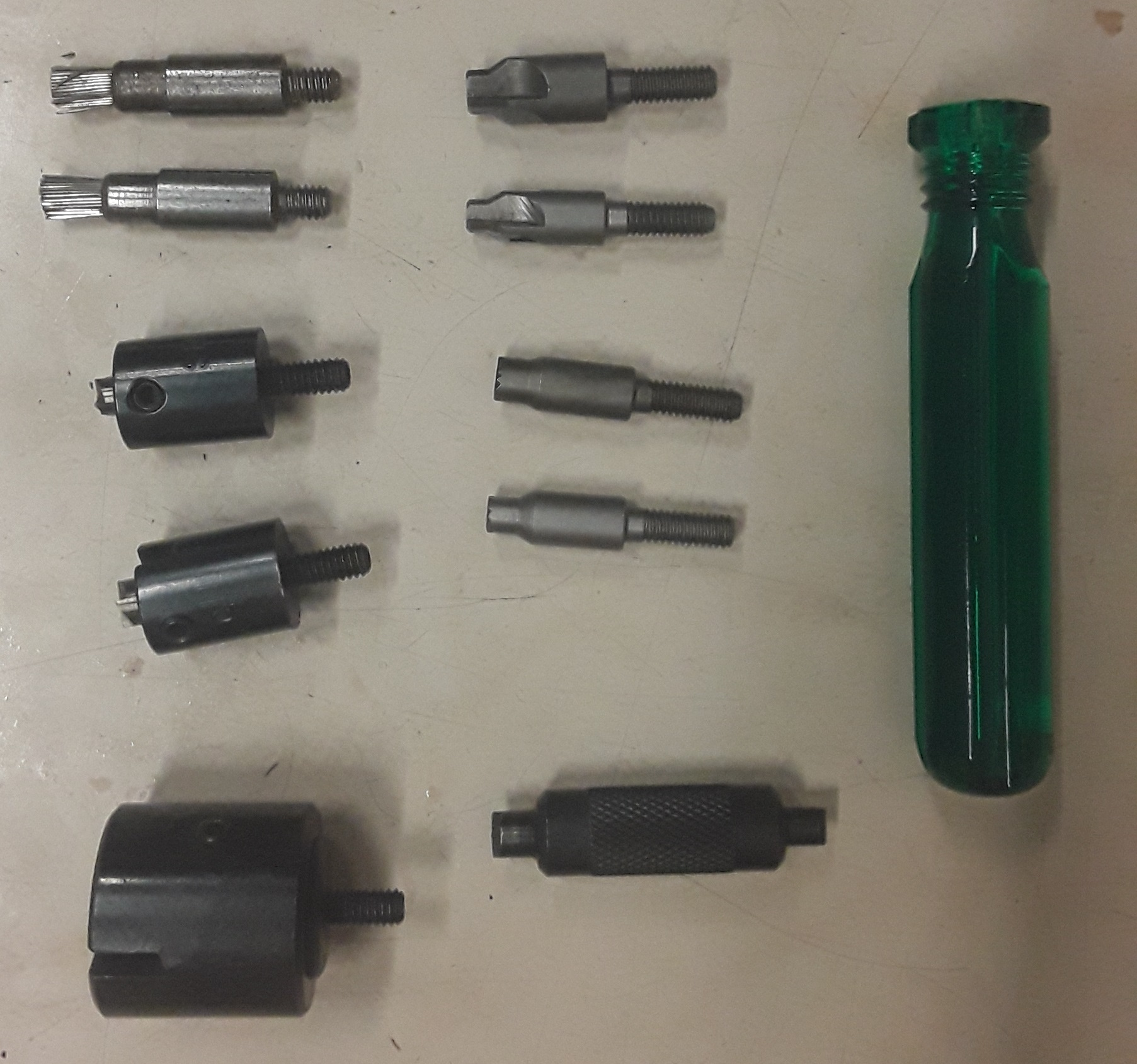
Assortment of primer pocket tools from RCBS, Hornady, Lee and Lyman with a handle.

Primer pocket cleaning tools are used to remove residual combustion debris remaining in the primer pocket; both brush designs and single blade designs are commonly used. Dirty primer pockets can prevent setting primers at, or below, the cartridge head. Primer pocket reamers or swagers are used to remove military crimps in primer pockets.

Primer pocket uniformer tools are used to achieve a uniform primer pocket depth. These are small endmills with a fixed depth-spacing ring attached, and are mounted either in a handle for use as a handtool, or are sometimes mounted in a battery-operated screwdriver. Some commercial cartridges (notably Sellier & Bellot) use large rifle primers that are thinner than the SAAMI standards common in the United States, and will not permit seating a Boxer primer manufactured to U.S. standards; the use of a primer pocket uniformer tool on such brass avoids setting Boxer primers high when reloading, which would be a safety issue. Two sizes of primer pocket uniformer tools exist, the larger one is for large rifle (0.130-inch nominal depth) primer pockets and the smaller one is used for uniforming small rifle/pistol primer pockets.

Primer pocket swages can be either standalone, bench-mounted, specialized presses, or, alternatively, a special swage anvil die that can be mounted into a standard "O" style loading press, along with a special shell holder insert with either a large or a small primer pocket insert swage that is then inserted into the position on the "O" press where a normal shell holder is usually clicked into position. This way, both small and large primer pockets on different types of military cases can be properly processed to remove primer pocket crimps. Both types of presses can be used to remove either ring crimps or stab crimps found on military cartridges when reloading them. Reamers for removing primer pocket crimps are not associated with presses, being an alternative to using a press to remove military case primer pocket crimps.

Flash hole uniforming tools are used to remove any burrs, which are residual brass remaining from the manufacturing punching operation used in creating flash holes. These tools resemble primer pocket uniformer tools, except being thinner, and commonly include deburring, chamfering, and uniforming functions. The purpose of these tools is to achieve a more equal distribution of flame from the primer to ignite the powder charge, resulting in consistent ignition from case to case.

=== Case trimmer ===
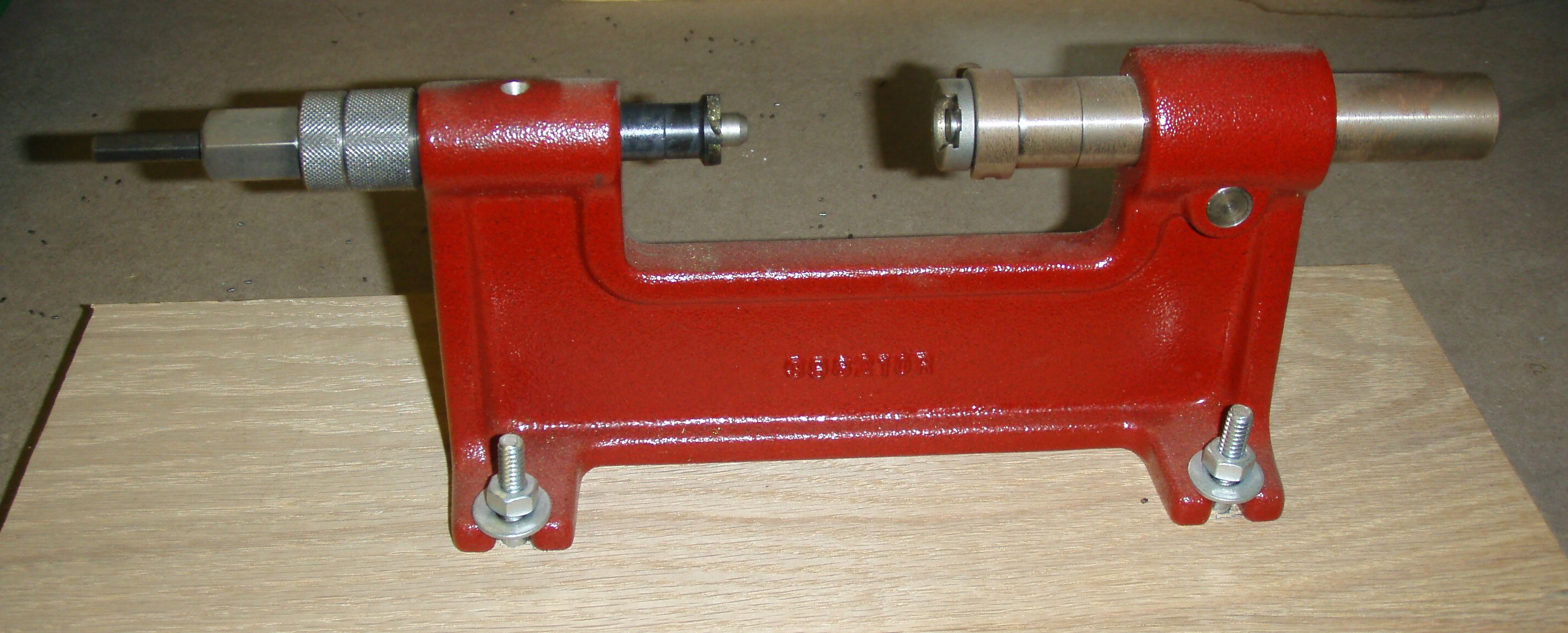
Hornady Manual Case Trimmer

Cases that have been fired and reloaded numerous times will need trimming due to brass flowing forward during firing, especially bottleneck cases. How much a case will grow depends upon load pressure, cartridge design, chamber size, functional cartridge headspace (usually the most important factor), and other variables. Periodically cases need to be trimmed to bring them back to proper specifications. Most reloading manuals list both a trim size and a max length. Long cases can create a safety hazard through improper headspace and possible increased pressure.

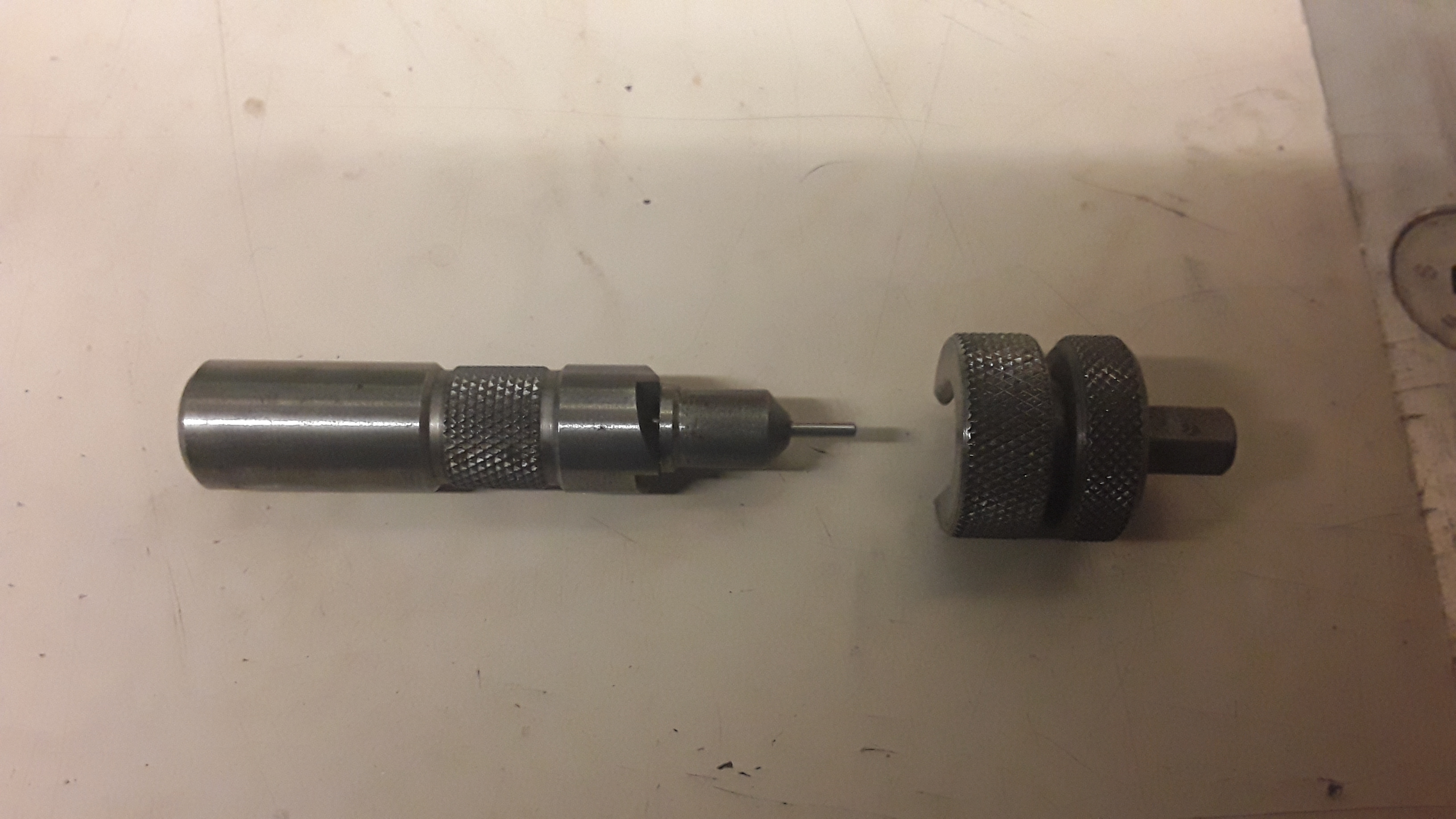
Lee hand trimmer

Several kinds of case trimmers are available. Die-based trimmers have an open top and allow the case to be trimmed with a file during the loading process. Manual trimmers usually have a base that has a shellholder at one end and a cutting bit at the opposite end, with a locking mechanism to hold the case tight and in alignment with the axis of the cutter, similar to a small lathe. Typically the device is cranked by hand, but sometimes they have attachments to allow the use of a drill or powered screwdriver. Powered case trimmers are also available. They usually consist of a motor (electric drills are sometimes used) and special dies or fittings that hold the case to be trimmed at the appropriate length, letting the motor do the work of trimming.

=== Priming tool ===
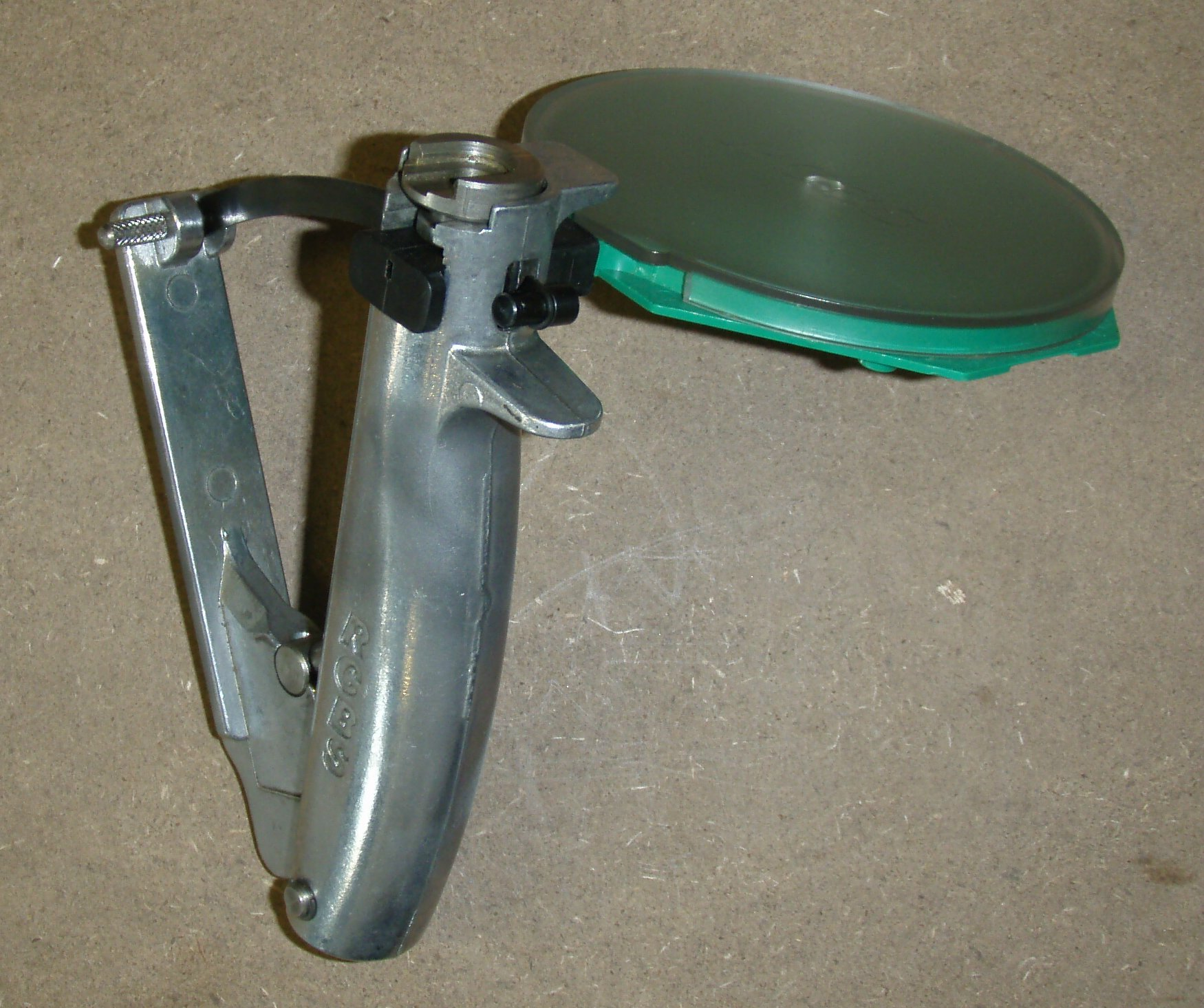
An RCBS hand primer

Single-stage presses often do not provide an easy way of installing primers to ("priming") cases. Various add-on tools can be used for priming the case using the press, or a separate tool can be used. Since cases loaded by a single-stage press are done in steps, with the die being changed between steps, a purpose-made, separate, priming tool is often faster than setting up a press to prime. Also, hand primers can be more consistent in setting primer depth due to being able to "feel" what the tool is doing.

=== Weighing scale ===
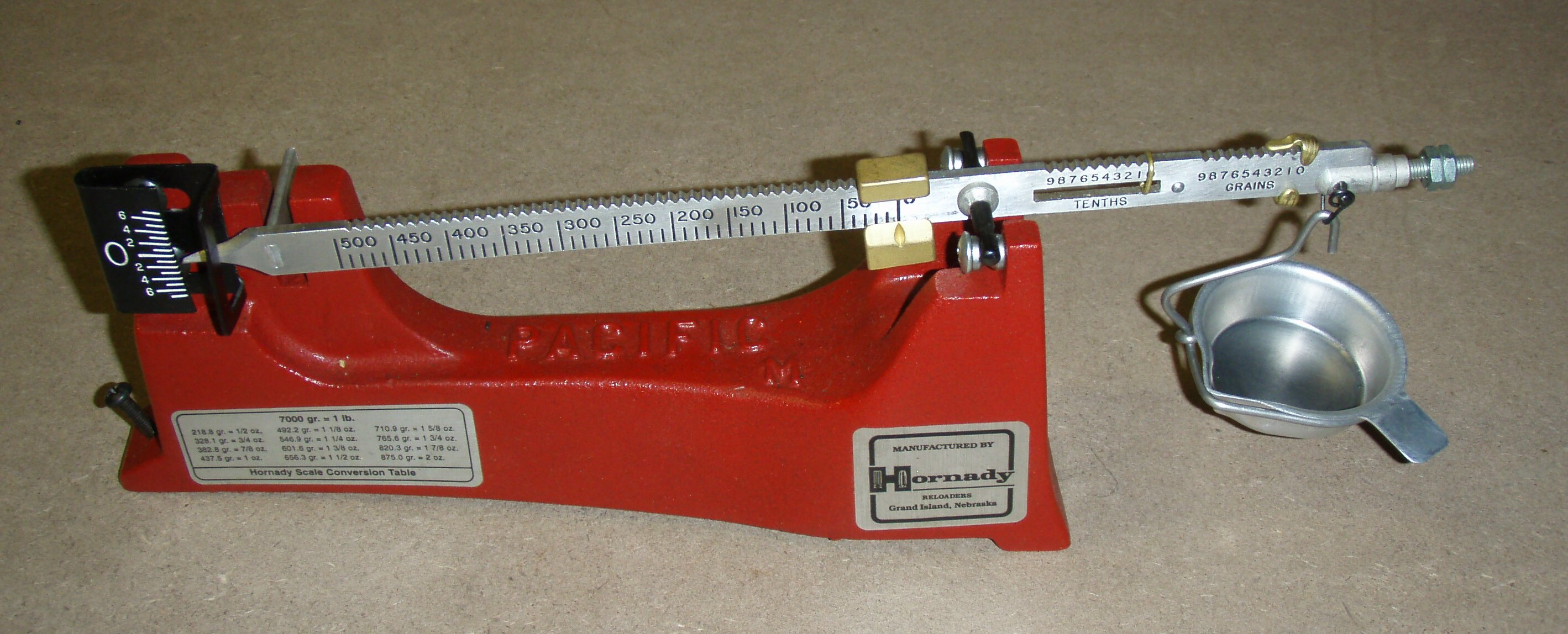
Hornady Powder Scale

A precision weighing scale is a near necessity for reloading. While it is possible to load using nothing but a powder measure and a weight-to-volume conversion chart, this greatly limits the precision with which a load can be adjusted, increasing the danger of accidentally overloading cartridges with powder for loads near or at the maximum safe load. With a powder scale, an adjustable powder measure can be adjusted to more precisely meter the powder charge. Additionally, periodically checking the powder charge during a reloading session can make sure that the measure is not drifting. With a powder trickler, a charge can be measured directly into the scale, giving the most accurate measure.

A scale also allows bullets and cases to be sorted by weight, which can further increase consistency. Sorting bullets by weight has obvious benefits, as each set of matched bullets will perform more consistently. Sorting cases by weight is done to group cases by case volume, and match cases with similar interior volumes.

There are 3 types of reloading scales:

- Mechanical reloading scale (they are measured manually with no usage of power).
- Digital Scales (they need electricity or batteries to operate).
- Digital Scales with dispenser (they unite both reloading scales and dispense options into one version).

=== Powder dispenser ===
Powder is measured by weight (usually grains or grams) but can dispensed by volume. Beginning reloading kits often include a weight-to-volume conversion chart for a selection of common powders and a set of powder volume measures graduated in small increments. By adding the various measures of powder the desired charge can be measured with a safe degree of accuracy. However, since weighing individual powder charges or using "dippers" can be time-consuming, a powder measuring dispensor is often used. A powder measure has a changeable or adjustable cavity to adjust the volume of the charge. A powder measure accurate to 1/10 grain (6.5 mg) is desirable.

A final type of dispenser is an all in one electronic scale and trickler. These will automatically dispense the next charge after the pan is returned to the scale.

Additionally, a powder trickler can be used to slowly add powder to a volumetrically measured charge on a scale to bring the charge up to the desired amount. Tricklers allow very precise powder charges.

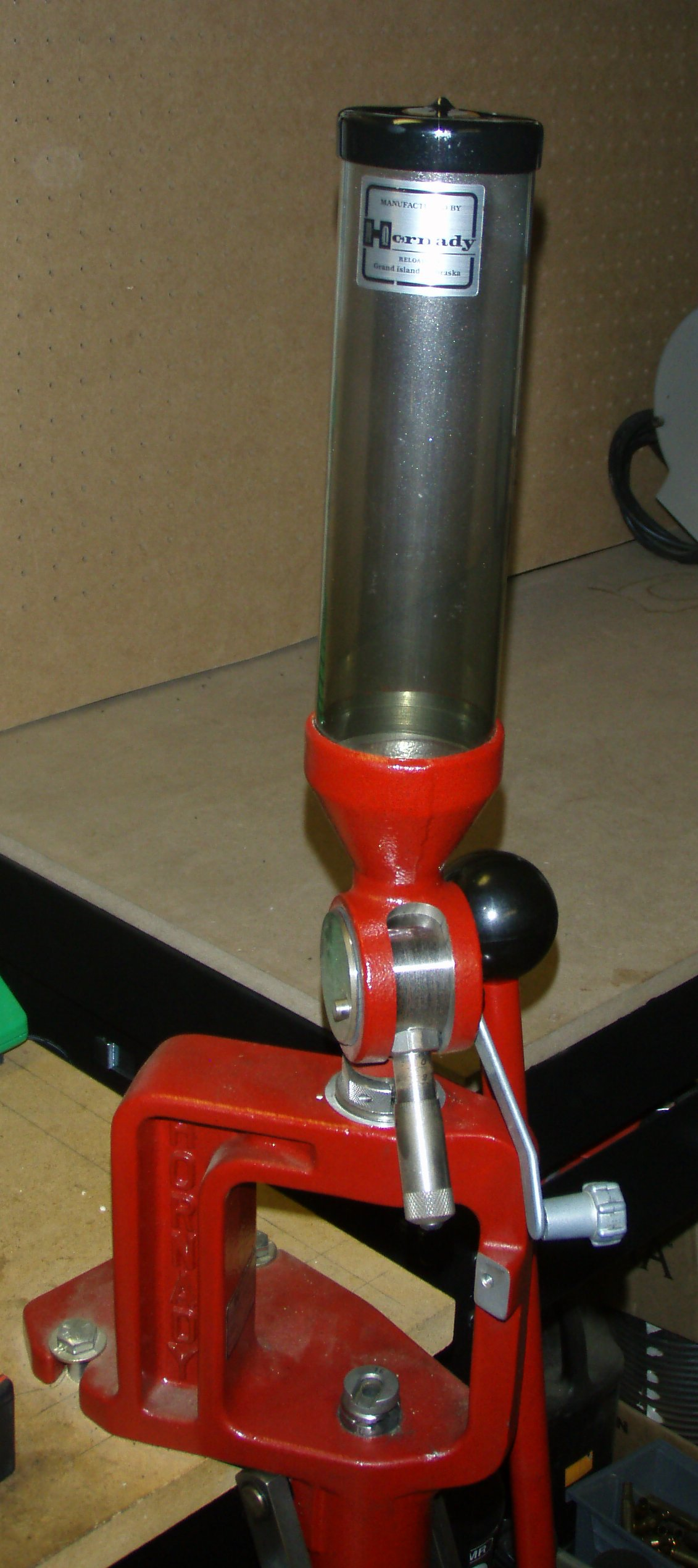
Hornady Lock‑N‑Load® Bench Rest Grade Powder Measure

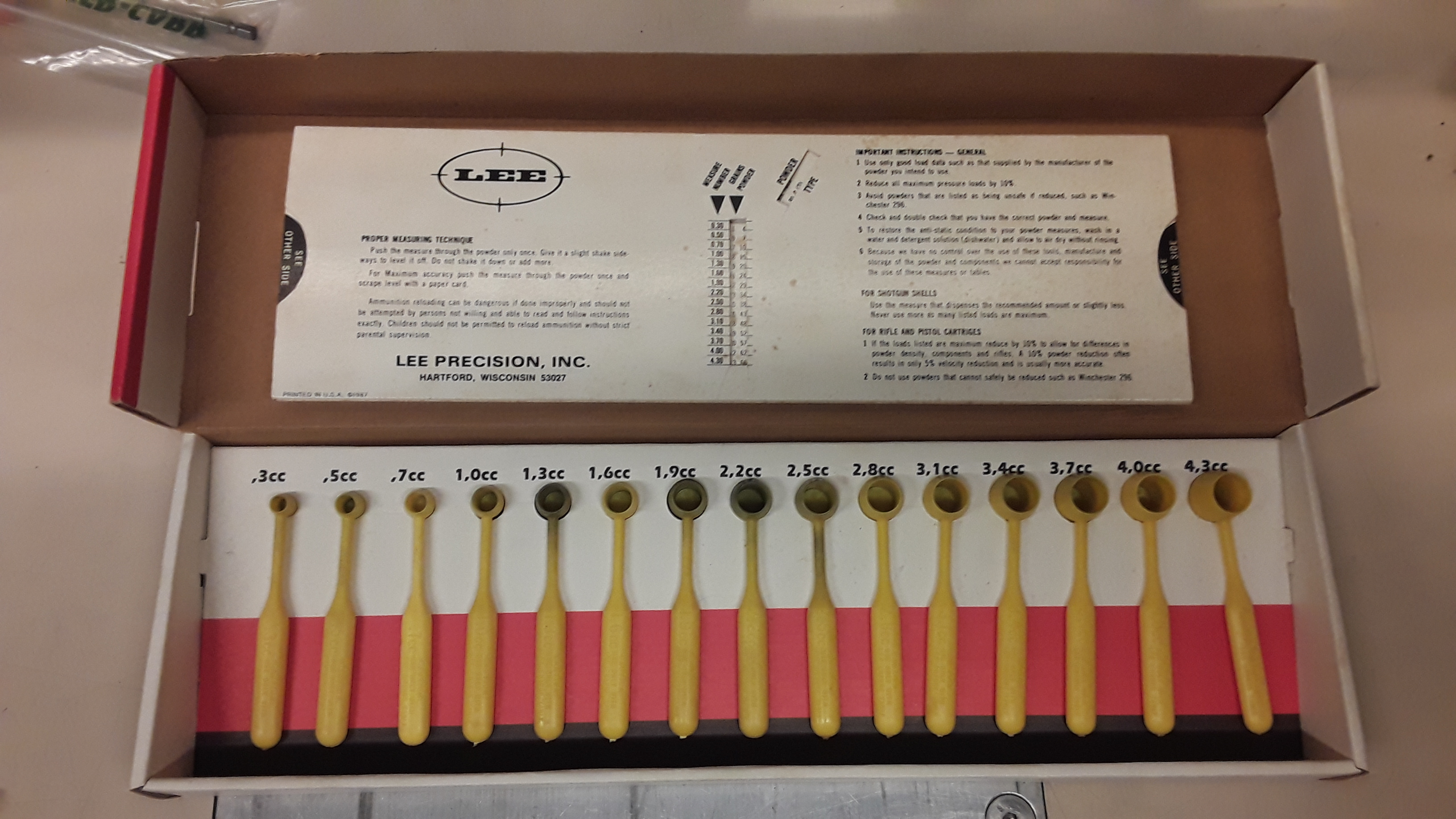
Lee Powder Measure Dipper Kit

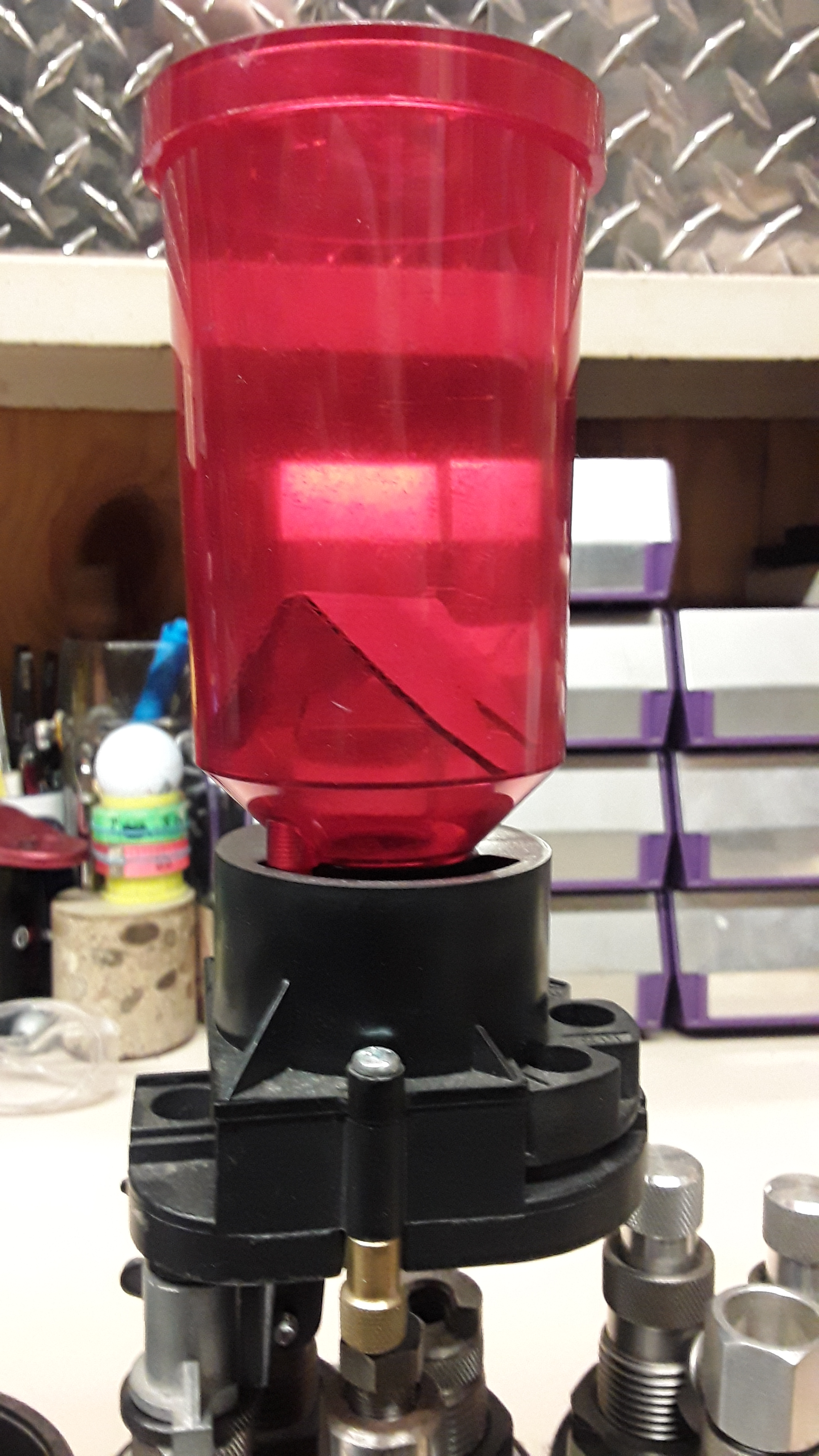
Lee Pro Auto Disk automatic powder measure

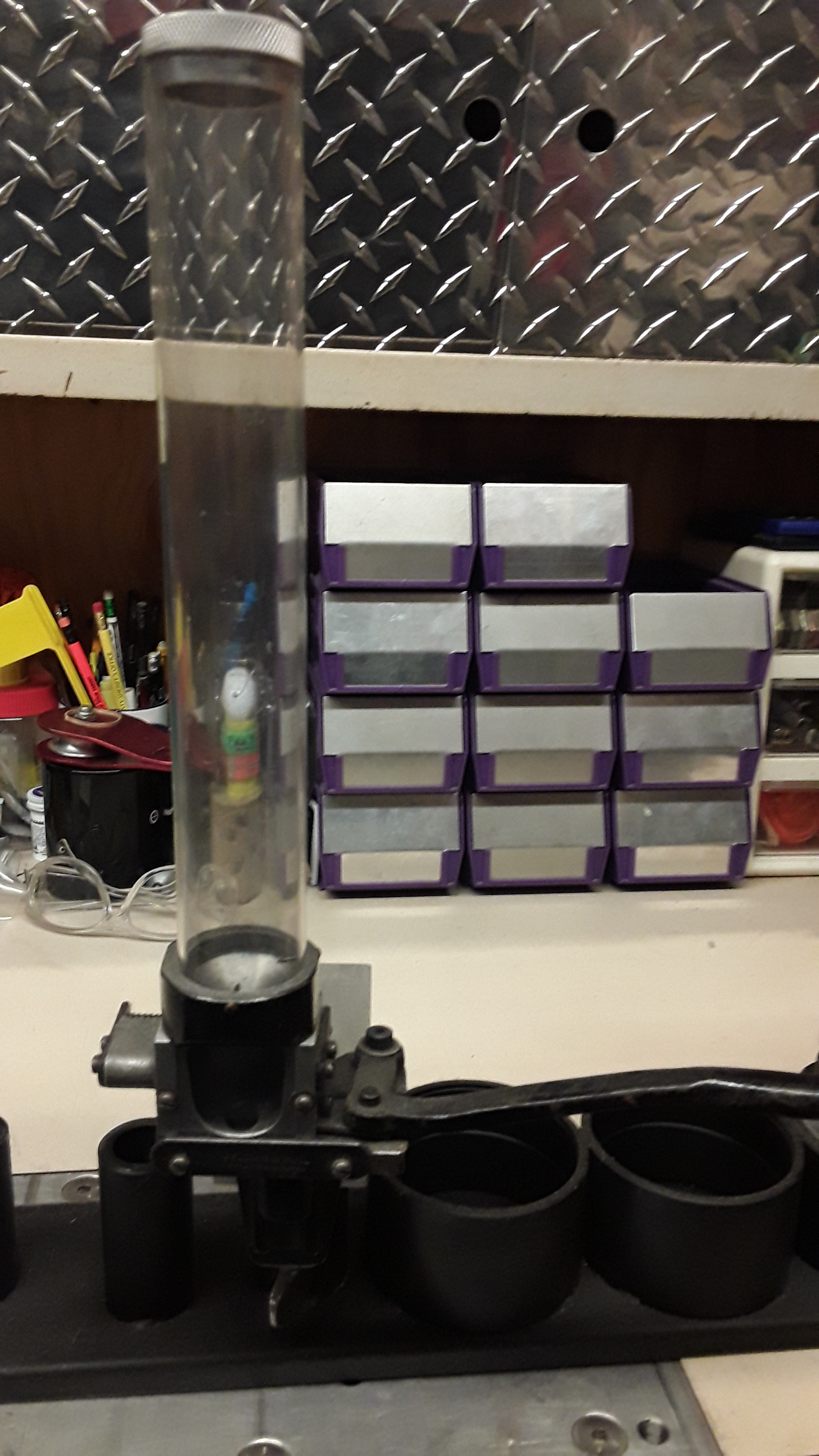
Belding & Mull Visible Powder Measure

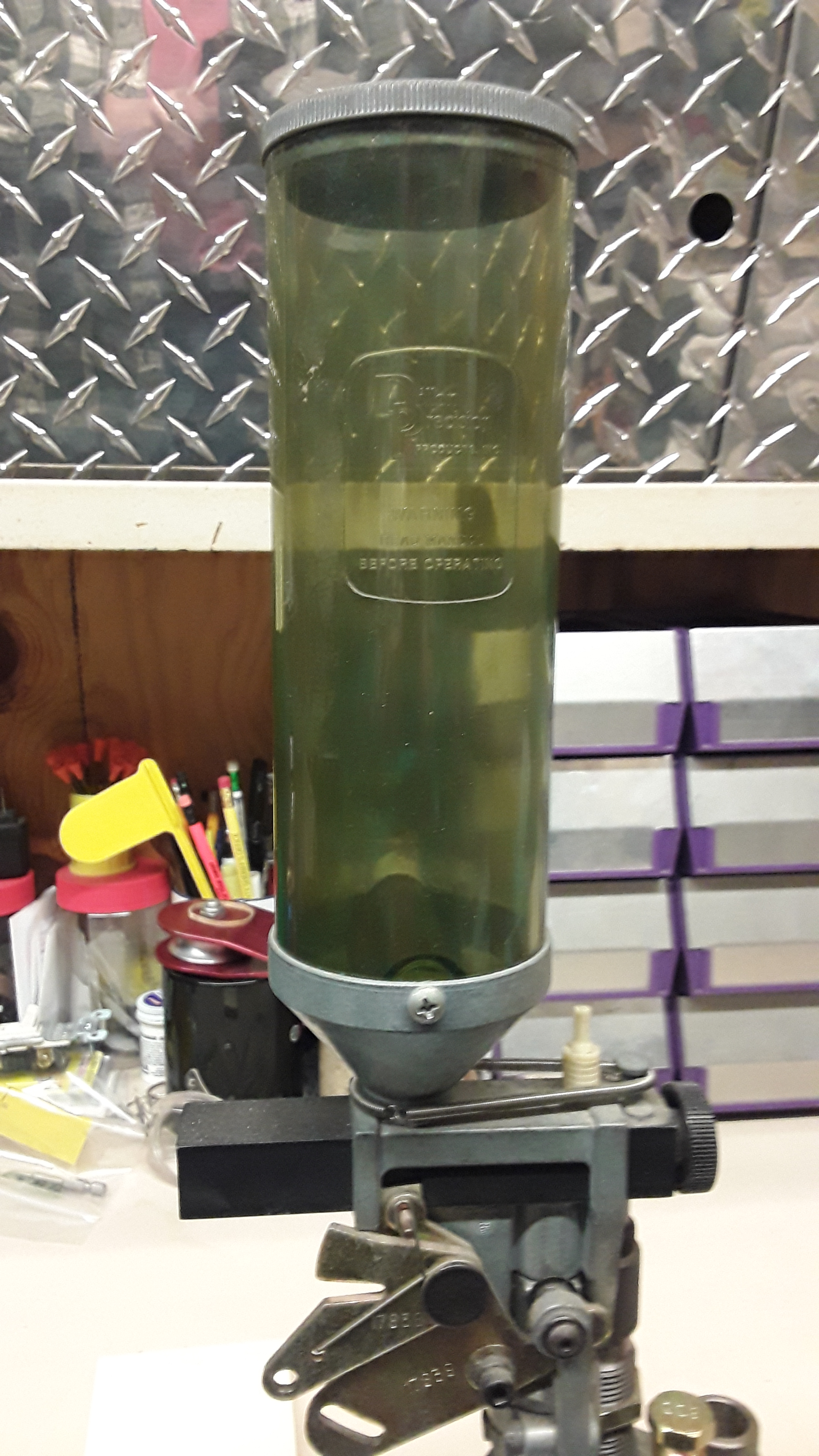
Dillon Powder Measure

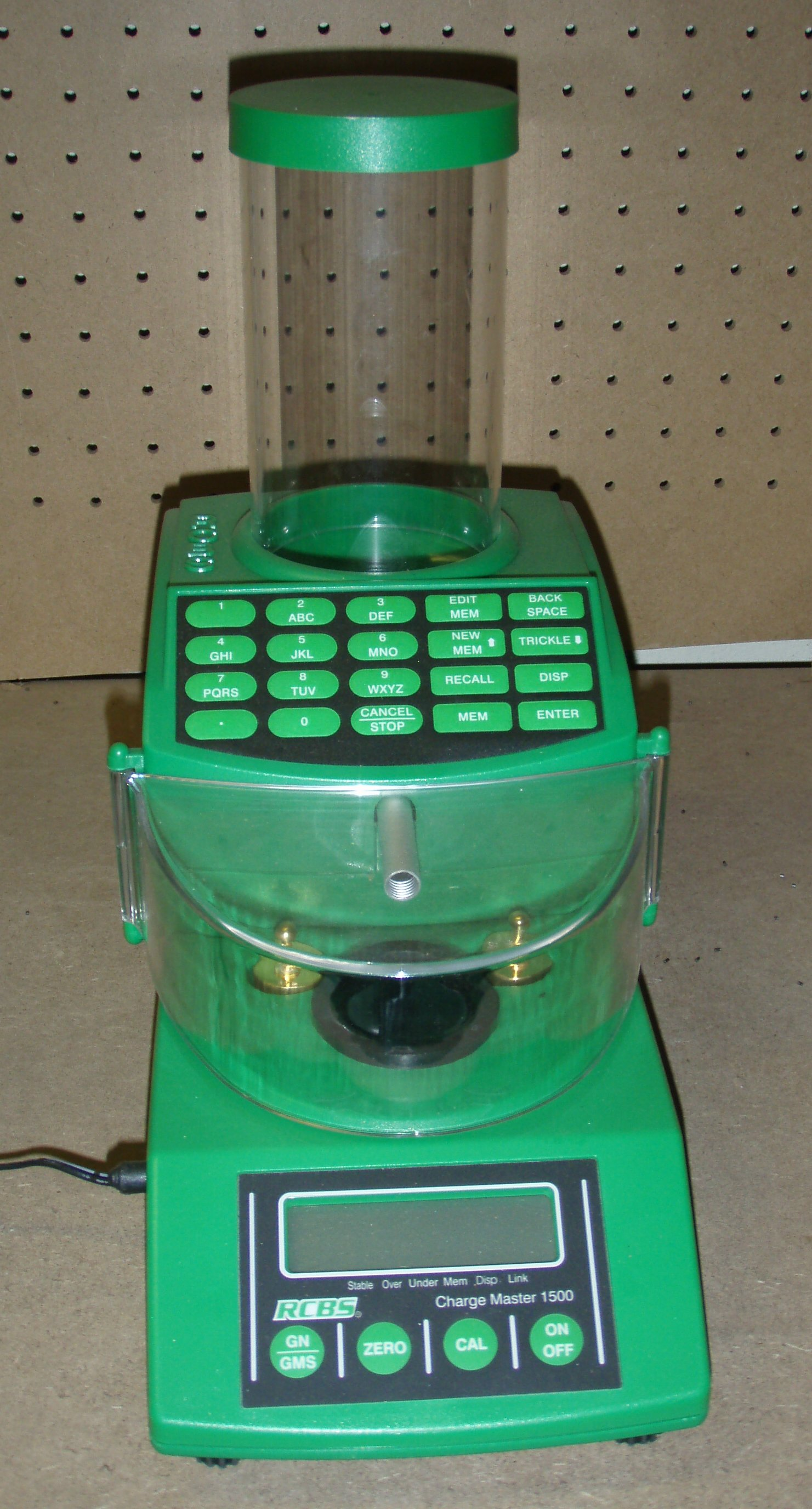
RCBS Chargemaster 1500 powder dispenser

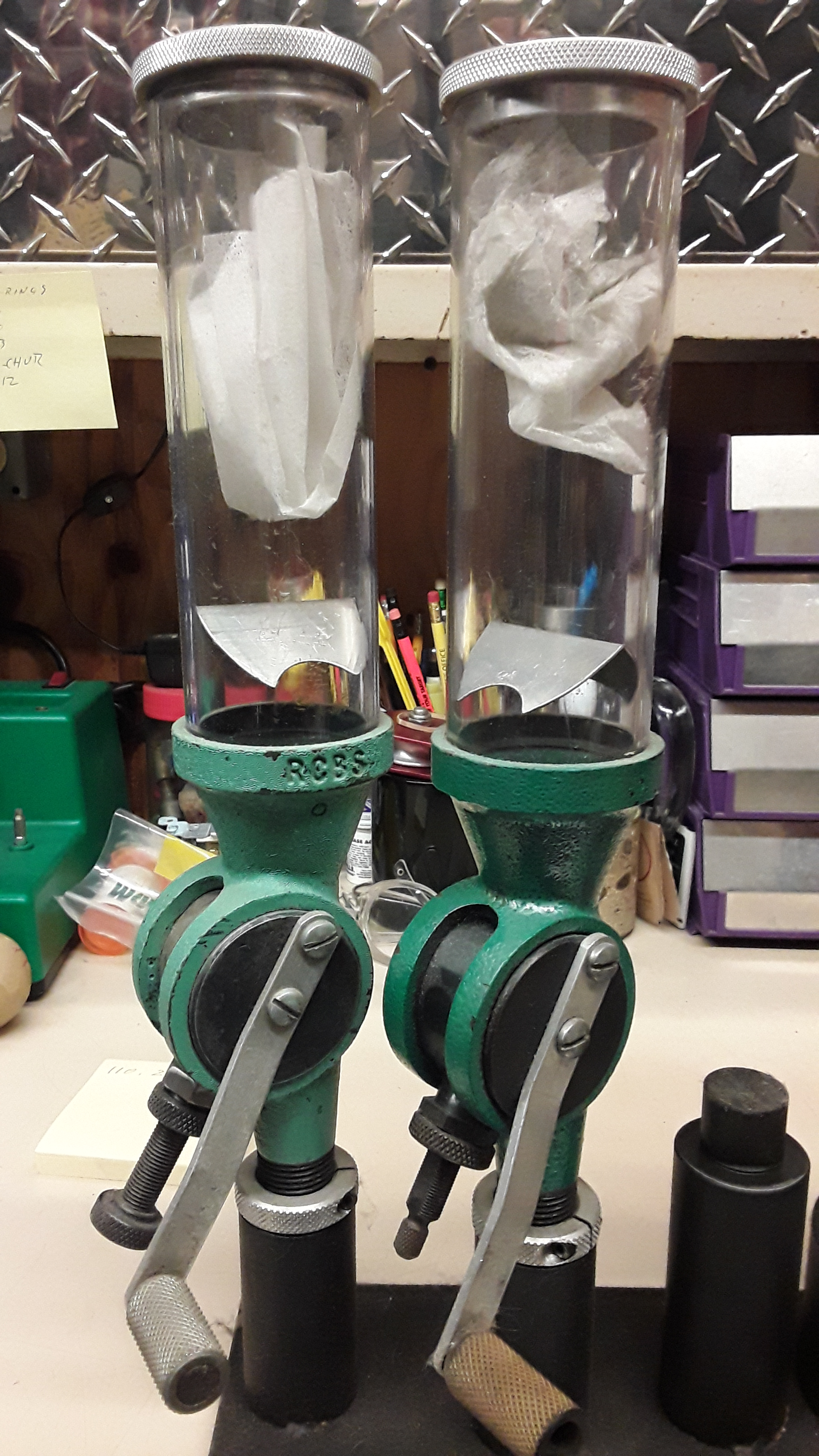
RCBS Uniflow Powder Measures

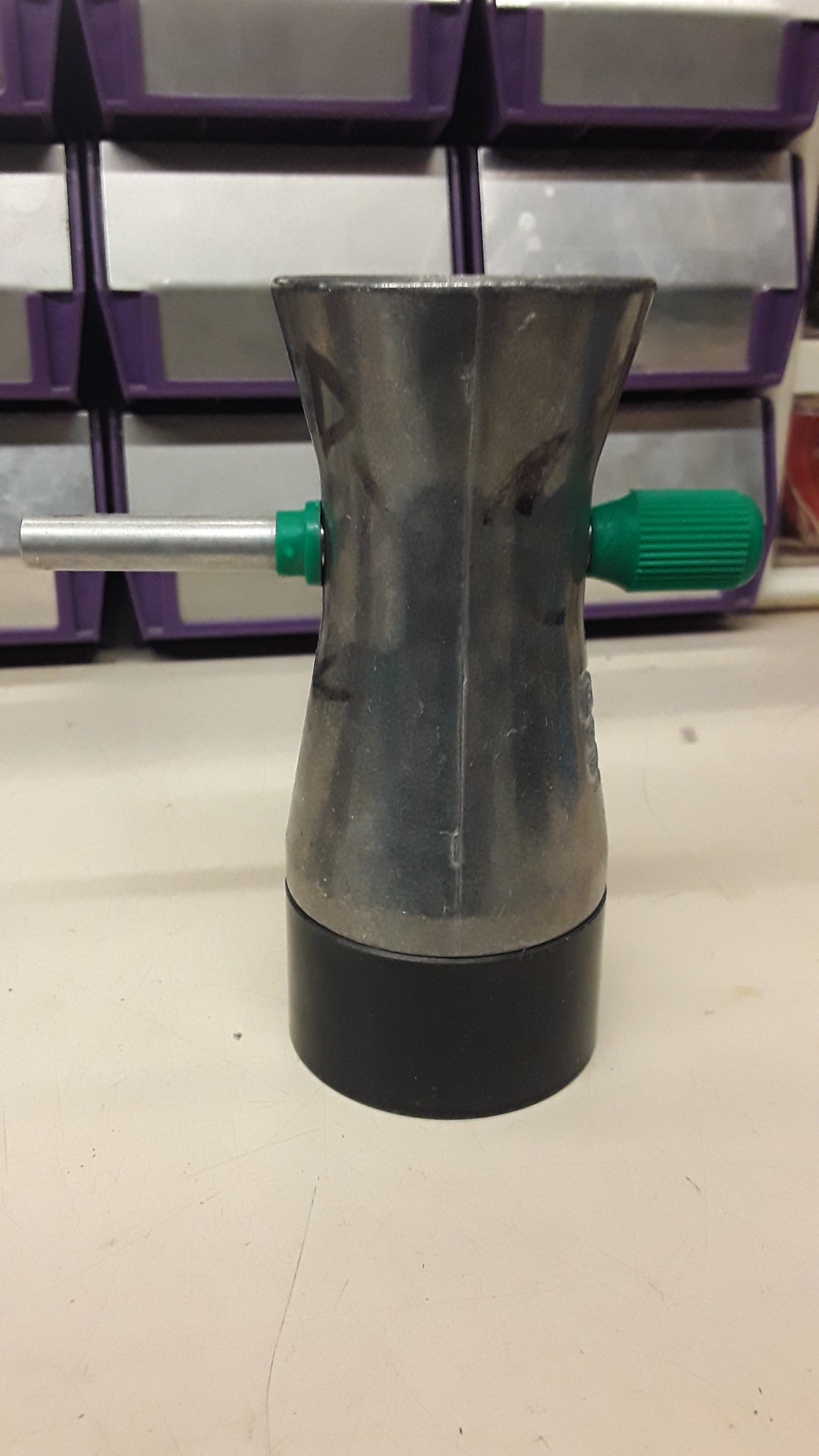
RCBS Powder Trickler

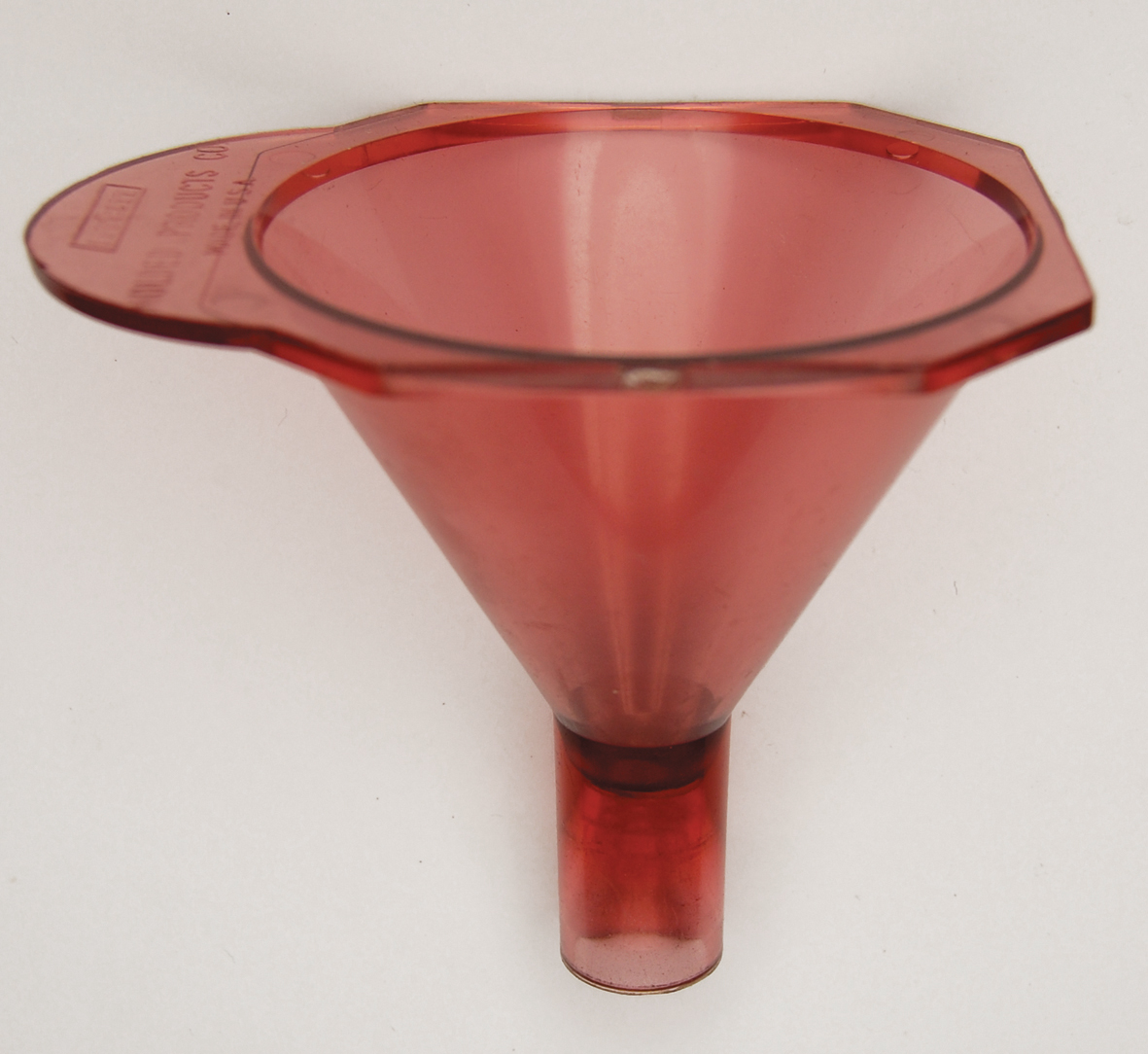
A typical powder funnel for manual dispensing

=== Headspace gauges and modified case gauges ===
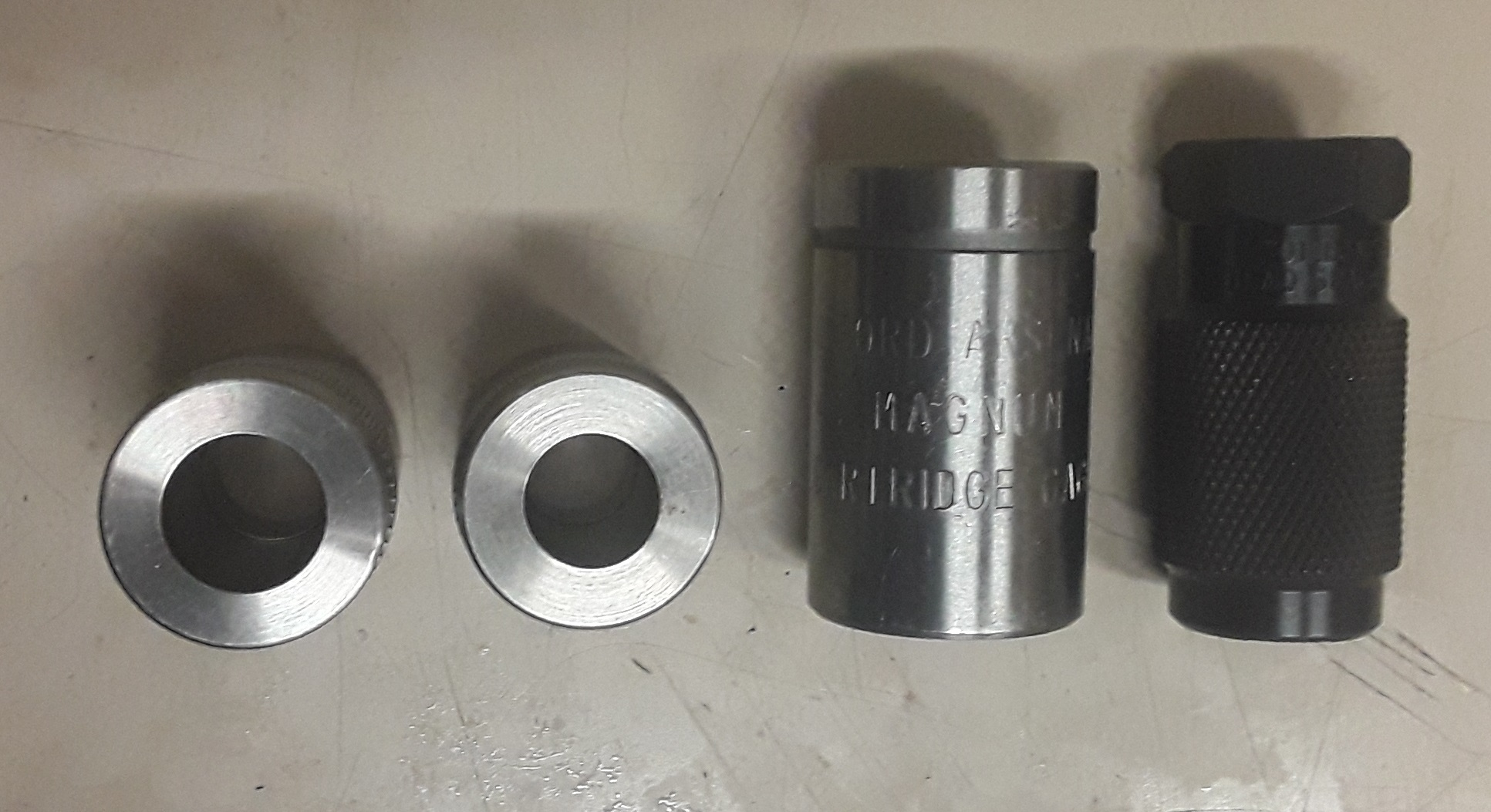

Bottleneck rifle cartridges are particularly prone to encounter incipient head separations if they are full-length re-sized and re-trimmed to their maximum permitted case lengths each time they are reloaded. In some such cartridges, such as the .303 British when used in Enfield rifles, as few as 1 or 2 reloadings can be the limit before the head of the cartridge will physically separate from the body of the cartridge when fired. The solution to this problem, of avoiding overstretching of the brass case, and thereby avoiding the excessive thinning of the wall thickness of the brass case due to case stretching, is to use what is called a "headspace gauge". Contrary to its name, it does not actually measure a rifle's headspace. Rather, it measures the distance from the head of the cartridge to the middle of the shoulder of the bottleneck cartridge case. For semi-automatic and automatic rifles, the customary practice is to move the midpoint of this shoulder back by no more than 0.005 inches, for reliable operation, when resizing the case. For bolt-action rifles, with their additional camming action, the customary practice is to move this shoulder back by only 0.001 to 0.002 inches when resizing the case. In contrast to full-length resizing of bottleneck rifle cartridges, which can rapidly thin out the wall thickness of bottleneck rifle cartridges due to case stretching that occurs each time when fired, partial length re-sizing of the bottleneck case pushes shoulders back only a few thousandths of an inch will often permit a case to be safely reloaded 5 times or more, even up to 10 times, or more for very light loads.

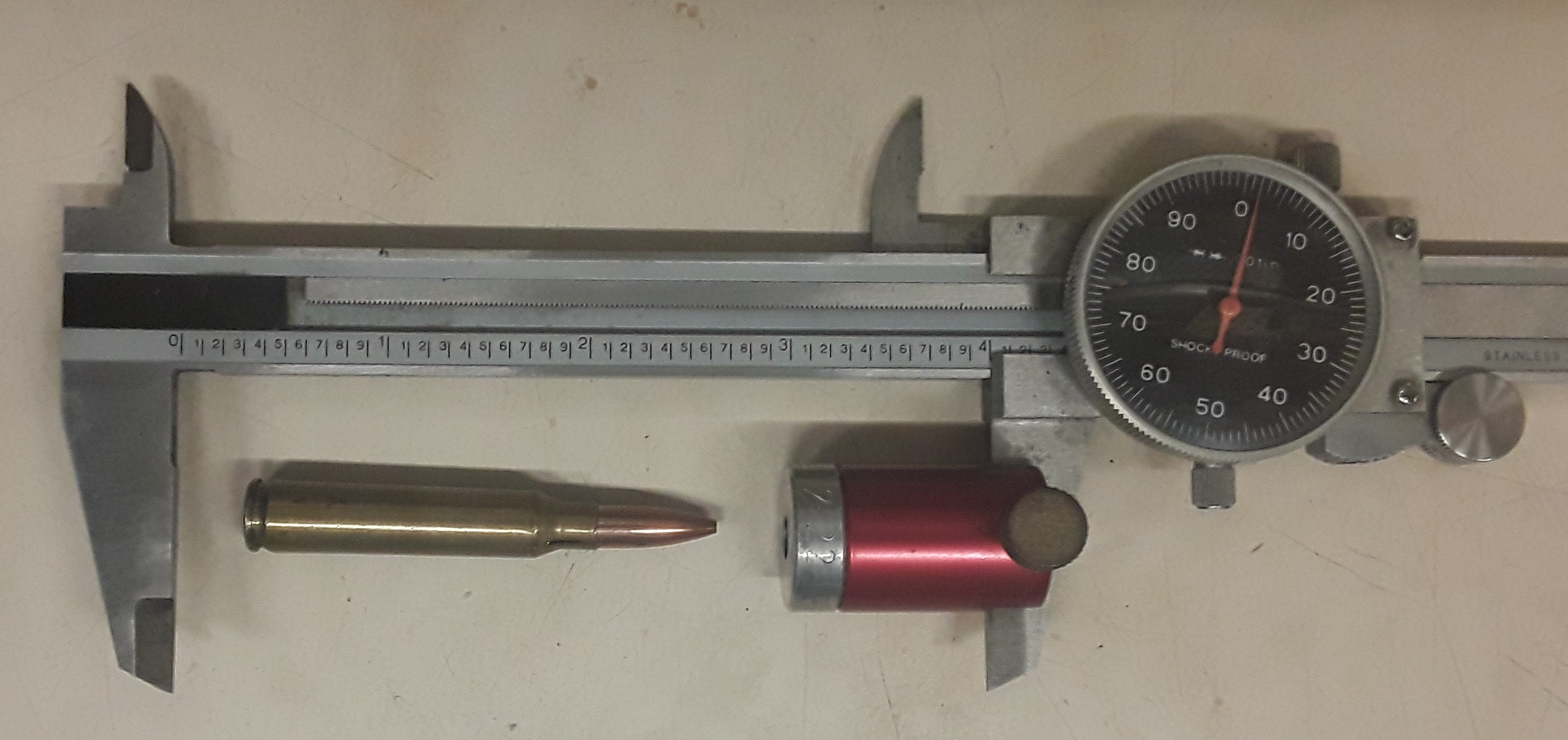

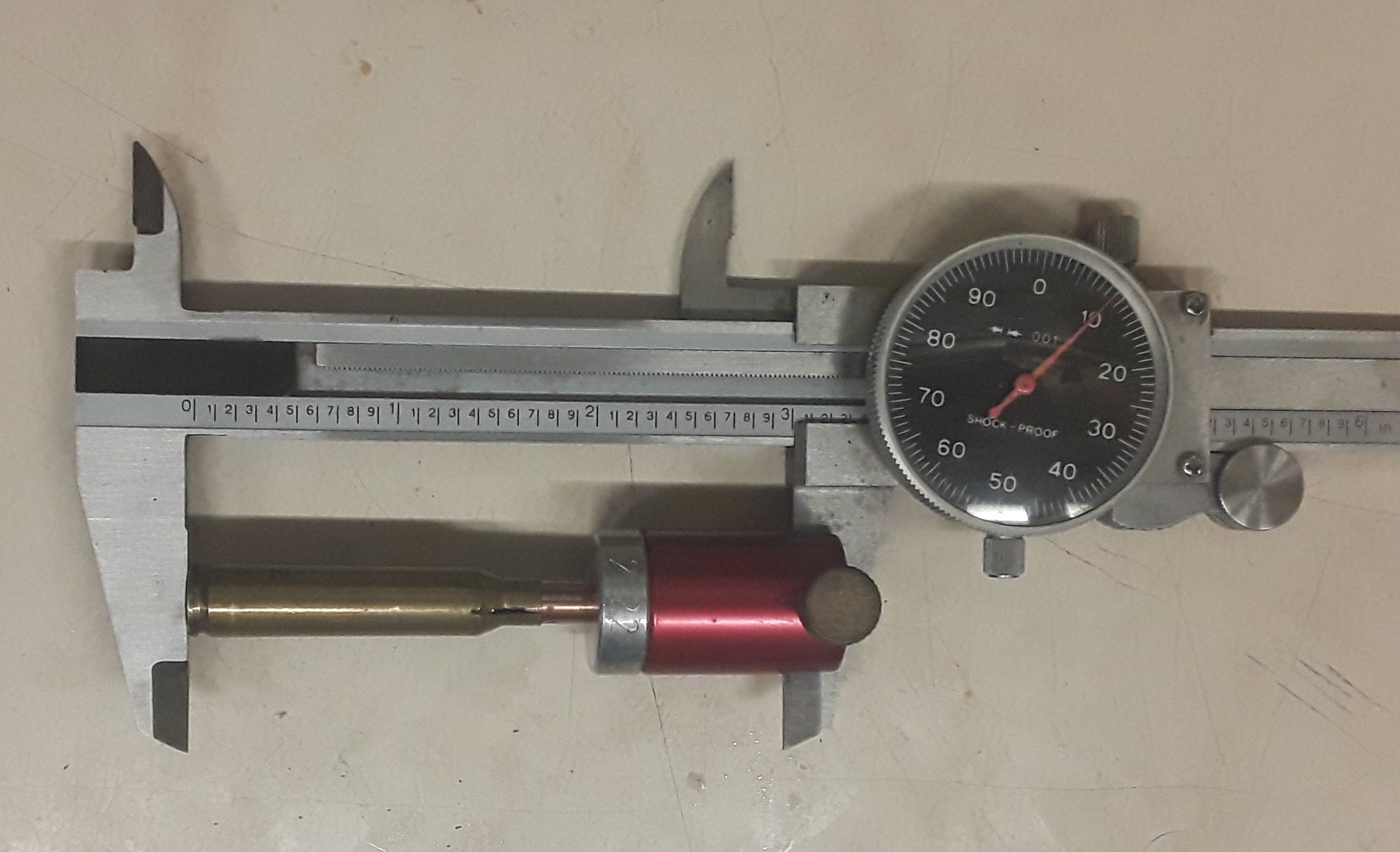
Modified case and ogive gauge in use

Similarly, by using modified case gauges, it is possible to measure precisely the distance from a bullet ogive to the start of rifling in a particular rifle for a given bottleneck cartridge. Maximum accuracy for a rifle is often found to occur for only one particular fixed distance from the start of rifling in a bore to a datum line on a bullet ogive. Measuring the overall cartridge length does not permit setting such fixed distances accurately, as different bullets from different manufacturers will often have a different ogive shape. It is only by measuring from a fixed diameter point on a bullet ogive to the start of a bore's rifling that proper spacing can be determined to maximize accuracy. A modified case gauge can provide the means by which to achieve an improvement in accuracy with precision handloads.

Such head space gauges and modified case gauges can, respectively, permit greatly increasing the number of times a rifle bottleneck case can be reloaded safely, as well as improve greatly the accuracy of such handloads. Unlike the situation with using expensive factory ammunition, handloaded match ammunition can be made that is vastly more accurate, and, through reloading, that can be much more affordable than anything that can be purchased, being customized for a particular rifle.

=== Bullet puller ===
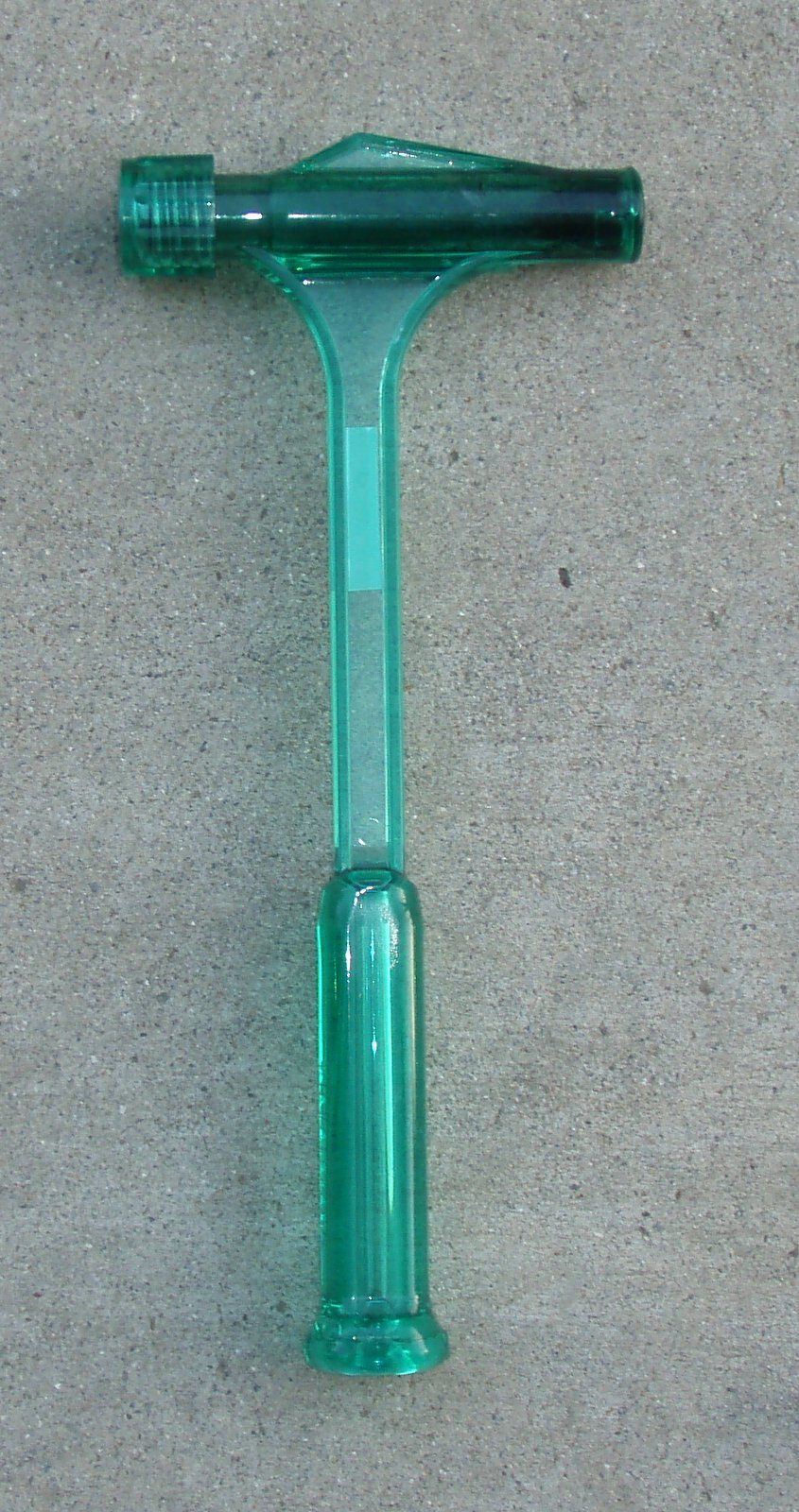
Impact Bullet Puller

Like any complex process, mistakes in handloading are easy to make, and a bullet puller device allows the handloader to disassemble mistakes. Most pullers use inertia to pull the bullet, and are often shaped like hammers. When in use, the case is locked in place in a head-down fashion inside the far end of the "hammer", and then the device is swung and struck against a firm surface. The sharp impact will suddenly decelerate the case, but the inertia exerted by the heavier mass of the bullet will keep it moving and thus pull it free from the case in a few blows, while the powder and bullet will get caught by a trapping container within the puller after the separation. Collet-type pullers are also available, which use a caliber-specific clamp to grip the bullet, while a loading press is used to pull the case downwards. It is essential that the collet be a good match for the bullet diameter because a poor match can result in significant deformation of the bullet.

== Procedures ==
=== Pistol/rifle cartridges ===
The operations performed when handloading cartridges are:

- Case preparation
  - Depriming — the removal of any old, expended primers from previously fired cases. Usually done with a thin rod that is inserted into the flash hole via the case mouth and push out the primer from inside.
  - Case cleaning — removal of foulings and tarnishes from the cases, optional but recommended for reused rifle or pistol cases.
    - Primer pocket cleaning and flash hole uniforming (optional) — the primer pockets and flash holes will have deposits from previous primer combustion, as well as occasional deformation, that need fixing; generally only benchrest shooters perform these.
  - Case inspection — looking for cracks or other defects, and discard visibly imperfect cases. The interior may be inspected by a wire-feeler or feeler gauge to detect emerging interior cracks. Bent case mouths may be repaired during resizing.
  - Reaming or swage crimping the primer pocket (reloading military cases only), or milling the primer pocket depth using a primer pocket uniformer tool
  - Gauging and trimming — measuring the case length and removing excess length from the case neck (as needed; rarely required with handgun cases)
  - Deburring and reaming — smoothing the case mouth edge (optional, as-needed; only trimmed cases need to be deburred); some benchrest shooters also do exterior neck turning at this stage in order to make the cartridge case have a uniform thickness, so the bullet will be crimped and released with the most uniformity.
  - Case lubrication — applying surface lubricant on the exterior surface of the cases to prevent them from getting stuck inside the die (tungsten carbide dies do not require lubrication).
    - Cleaning excess lubricant off the cases
- Resizing and reshaping — modifying the shape of the case neck/shoulder and/or removing any dents and deformities.
  - Expanding or chamfering the case mouth — to allow easier, smoother seating of the bullet before pressing (not required for boat-tailed bullets)
- Priming — seating a new primer into the case (primer pockets often become loose after multiple loadings; a lack of effort being required to seat new primers indicates a loose primer pocket; cases with loose primer pockets are usually discarded, after crushing the case to prevent its reuse)
- Powder charging — adding a measured amount of propellant powder into the case. This is a critical step, as incorrect powder charges are extremely dangerous, both undercharged (which can lead to a squib load) as well as overcharged (which can cause the gun to suffer catastrophic failure and explode).
- Bullet seating — positioning the bullet in the case mouth for the correct cartridge overall length (OAL) and for aligning bullet cannelure (if present) with the case mouth
- Crimping — Pressing and tightening the case mouth to fix the bullet in place; some may hold the bullet with neck tension alone.
- Final cartridge inspection

When previously fired cases are used, they must be inspected before loading. Cases that are dirty or tarnished are often polished in a tumbler to remove oxidation and allow easier inspection of the case. Cleaning in a tumbler will also clean the interior of cases, which is often considered important for handloading high-precision target rounds. Cracked necks, non-reloadable cases (steel, aluminum, or Berdan primed cases), and signs of head separation are all reasons to reject a case. Cases are measured for length, and any that are over the recommended length is trimmed down to the minimum length. Competition shooters will also sort cases by brand and weight to ensure consistency.

Removal of the primer, called decapping or depriming, is usually done with a die containing a steel pin that punches out the primer from inside the case. Berdan primed cases require a different technique, either a hydraulic ram or a hook that punctures the primer cup and levers it out from the bottom. Military cases often have crimped-in primers, and decapping them leaves a slightly indented ring (most common) or, for some military cartridges, a set of stabbed ridges located on the edge of the primer pocket opening that inhibits or prevents seating a new primer into a decapped case. A reamer or a swage is used to remove both these styles of crimp, whether ring crimps or stab crimps. The purpose of all such primer crimps is to make military ammunition more reliable under more extreme environmental conditions. Some military cartridges also have sealants placed around primers, in addition to crimps, to provide additional protection against moisture intrusion that could deactivate the primer for any ammunition exposed to water under battlefield conditions. Decapping dies, though, easily overcome the additional resistance of sealed primers, with no significant difficulty beyond that encountered when removing non-sealed primers.

When a cartridge is fired, the internal pressure expands the case to fit the chamber in a process called obturation. To allow ease of chambering the cartridge when it is reloaded, the case is swaged back to size. Competition shooters, using bolt-action rifles that are capable of camming a tight case into place, often resize only the neck of the cartridge, called neck sizing, as opposed to the normal full-length resizing process. Neck sizing is only useful for cartridges to be re-fired in the same firearm, as the brass may be slightly oversized in some dimensions for other chambers, but the precise fit of the case to the chamber will allow greater consistency and therefore greater potential accuracy. Some believe that neck sizing will permit a larger number of reloads with a given case in contrast to full-size resizing, although this is controversial. Semi-automatic rifles and rifles with SAAMI minimum chamber dimensions often require a special small base resizing die, that sizes further down the case than normal dies, and allows for more reliable feeding.

Once the case is sized down, the inside of the neck of the case will actually be slightly smaller than the bullet's diameter. To allow the bullet to be seated, the end of the neck is slightly expanded to allow the bullet to start into the case. Boattailed bullets need very little expansion, while unjacketed lead bullets require more expansion to prevent shaving of lead when the bullet is seated.

Priming the case is the most dangerous step of the loading process since the primers are pressure-sensitive. The use of safety glasses or goggles during priming operations can provide valuable protection in the rare event that an accidental detonation takes place. Seating a Boxer primer not only places the primer in the case, but it also seats the anvil of the primer down onto the priming compound, in effect arming the primer. A correctly seated primer will sit slightly below the surface of the case. A primer that protrudes from the case may cause a number of problems, including what is known as a slam fire, which is the firing of a case before the action is properly locked when chambering a round. This may either damage the gun and/or injure the shooter. A protruding primer will also tend to hang when feeding, and the anvil will not be seated correctly so the primer may not fire when hit by the firing pin. Primer pockets may need to be cleaned with a primer pocket brush to remove deposits that prevent the primer from being properly seated. Berdan primers must also be seated carefully, and since the anvil is part of the case, the anvil must be inspected before the primer is seated. For reloading cartridges intended for use in military-surplus firearms, rifles especially, "hard" primers are most commonly used instead of commercial "soft" primers. The use of "hard" primers avoids slamfires when loading finished cartridges in the military-surplus firearm. Such primers are available to handloaders commercially.

The quantity of gunpowder is specified by weight, but almost always measured by volume, especially in larger-scale operations. A powder scale is needed to determine the correct mass thrown by the powder measure, as loads are specified with a precision of 0.10 grain (6.5 mg). One grain is 1/7000 of a pound. Competition shooters will generally throw a slightly underweight charge, and use a powder trickler to add a few granules of powder at a time to the charge to bring it to the exact weight desired for maximum consistency. Special care is needed when charging large-capacity cases with fast-burning, low-volume powders. In this instance, it is possible to put two charges of powder in a case without overflowing the case, which can lead to dangerously high pressures and a significant chance of bursting the chamber of the firearm. Non-magnum revolver cartridges are the easiest to do this with, as they generally have relatively large cases, and tend to perform well with small charges of fast powders. Some powders meter (measured by volume) better than others due to the shape of each granule. When using volume to meter each charge, it is important to regularly check the charge weight on a scale throughout the process.

Competition shooters also often sort bullets by weight, often down to 0.10 grain (6.5 mg) increments. The bullet is placed in the case mouth by hand and then seated with the press. At this point, the expanded case mouth is also sized back down. A crimp can optionally be added, either by the seating die or with a separate die. Taper crimps are used for cases that are held in the chamber by the case mouth, while roll crimps may be used for cases that have headspace on a rim or on the cartridge neck. Roll crimps hold the bullet far more securely, and are preferred in situations, such as magnum revolvers, where recoil velocities are significant. A tight crimp also helps to delay the start of the bullet's motion, which can increase chamber pressures, and help develop full power from slower burning powders (see internal ballistics).

=== Shotgun shells ===
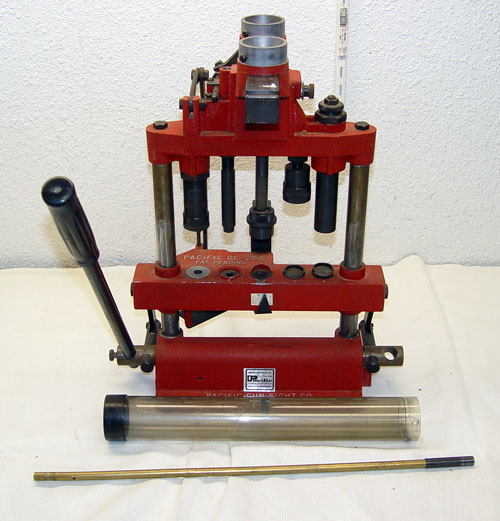
Pacific single stage shotshell reloading press (an inline design), showing the 5 stations standard to shotshell presses.

Unlike the presses used for reloading metallic cartridges, the presses used for reloading shotgun shells have become standardized to contain five stations, with the exact configuration of these five stations arranged either in a circle or in a straight row. Nonetheless, the operations performed using the industry-standard five station shotshell presses when handloading shotshells with birdshot, although slightly different, are very similar as to when reloading metallic cartridges:

- Selecting an appropriate charge bar and powder bushing, or charge bar with shot bushing and powder bushing, or a universal charge bar (if used) for measuring shot and powder, for the shotshell press.
- Verifying that all components are properly selected (hull, primer, powder, wad, and shot). (No substitutions are allowed in components, nor in charge weights of shot and powder. The only substitution allowed is in the brand of shot and the size of the shot (#8, #9, etc. Also, no substitutions are allowed in the shot material itself (whether it is lead shot, Hevi-Shot, steel shot, etc.)), as the malleability of lead shot is noticeably different than steel.)
- Loading shot and powder in the press, and verifying that the as-dropped weights are per an established, published, loading recipe using a calibrated scale. (Typically, five to ten trials of shot and powder drops, each, are recommended by shotshell press or universal charge bar user manuals.)
- Adjusting bushings or universal charge bar settings to account for small differences in densities due to lot-to-lot variations in both powder and shot.
- Inspecting each hull. (Examining for cracks or other hull defects, and discarding any visibly imperfect hulls. Also, turning each hull upside down to remove any foreign object debris before depriming.)
- Removing the fired primer and sizing/resizing the brass outer diameter at the base of the hull (Station 1).
- Inserting a primer in the well of the press, and sizing/resizing the inner diameter of the hull while inserting a new primer (Station 2).
- Verifying primer is fully seated, not raised. If primer is not fully seated, re-running operation at Station 2 until primer is fully seated.
- Positioning primed hull (at Station 3), pulling handle down, toggling charge bar to drop measured amount of powder, raising handle, inserting wad, dropping handle again to seat wad, toggling charge bar to drop measured amount of shot, raising handle.
- Pre-crimping of shell (Station 4).
- Final crimping of shell (Station 5).
- Inspecting crimping on shell. If crimp is not fully flat, re-crimping (Station 5).
- Inspecting bottles of shot and powder on the shotshell press, adding more as needed before it runs out.
- Cutting open four or five shells randomly selected from a large lot of handloaded shells, respectively, and verifying that the as-thrown weights of powder and shot are both within desired tolerances of the published recipe that was followed. (Optional, but recommended.)

The exact details for accomplishing these steps on particular shotshell presses vary depending on the brand of the press, although the presence of 5 stations is standard among all modern presses.

The use of safety glasses or goggles while reloading shotshells can provide valuable protection in the rare event that an accidental detonation takes place during priming operations.

The quantities of both gunpowder and shot are specified by weight when loading shotshells, but almost always measured solely by volume. A powder scale is therefore needed to determine the correct mass thrown by the powder measure, and by the shot measure, as powder loads are specified with a precision of 0.10 grain (6.5 mg), but are usually thrown with a tolerance of 0.2 to 0.3 grains in most shotshell presses. Similarly, shot payloads in shells are generally held to within a tolerance of plus or minus 3-5 grains. One grain is 1/7000 of a pound.

Shotshell reloading for specialty purposes, such as for buckshot or slugs, or other specialty rounds, is often practiced but varies significantly from the process steps discussed previously for handloading birdshot shotshells. The primary difference is that large shot cannot be metered in a charge bar, and so must be manually dropped, a ball at a time, in a specific configuration. Likewise, the need for specialty wads or extra wads, in order to achieve the desired stackup distance to achieve a full and proper crimp for a fixed shell length, say 2-3/4", causes the steps to differ slightly when handloading such shells.

Modern shotshells are all uniformly sized for Type 209 primers. However, reloaders should be aware that older shotshells were sometimes primed with a Type 57 or Type 69 primer (now obsolete), meaning that shotgun shell reloading tends to be done only with modern (or recently produced) components. Being essentially "published recipe" dependent, antique shotshell reloading is not widely practiced, being more of a specialty, or niche, activity. Of course, when reloading for very old shotguns, such as those with Damascus barrels, special shotshell recipes that limit pressures to less than 4500 psi are still available, and these "recipes" are reloaded by some shotgunning enthusiasts. Typical shotshell pressures for handloads intended for modern shotguns range from approximately 4700 psi to 10,000 psi.

Brass shotshells are also reloaded, occasionally, but typically these are reloaded using standard rifle/pistol reloading presses with specialty dies, rather than with modern shotshell presses. Rather than plastic wads, traditional felt and paperboard wads are also generally used (both over powder and over shot) when reloading brass shotgun shells. Reloading brass shotshells is not widely practiced.

Shotguns, in general, operate at much lower pressures than pistols and rifles, typically operating at pressures of 10,000 psi, or less, for 12 gauge shells, whereas rifles and pistols routinely are operated at pressures in excess of 35,000 psi, and sometimes upwards of 50,000 psi. The SAAMI maximum permitted pressure limit is only 11,500 psi for 12 gauge 2-3/4 inch shells, so the typical operating pressures for many shotgun shells are only slightly below the maximum permitted pressures allowed for safe ammunition. Because of this small difference in typical operating vs. maximum industry allowed pressures and the fact that even small changes in components can cause pressure variances in excess of 4,000 psi, the components used in shotshell reloading must not be varied from published recipes, as the margin of safety relative to operating pressures for shotguns is much lower than for pistols and rifles. This lower operating pressure for shotguns and shells is also the reason why shotgun barrels have noticeably thinner walls than rifle and pistol barrels.

== Legal aspects ==
Since many countries heavily restrict the civilian possession of ammunition and ammunition components, including primers and smokeless powder, handloading may be explicitly or implicitly illegal in certain countries. Even without specific restrictions on powder and primers, they may be covered under other laws governing explosive materials. Handloading may require study and passing an exam to acquire a handloading permit prior to being allowed to handload ammunition in some jurisdictions. This is done to avoid catastrophic accidents caused by lack of knowledge/skill as much as possible, and also allows the government to maintain information on who reloads their own cartridges. The standards organization C.I.P. rules that the products of handloaders that do not comply with the C.I.P. ammunition approval rules for commercial ammunition manufacturers cannot be legally sold in C.I.P. member states.

Many firearms manufacturers explicitly advise against the use of handloaded ammunition. Generally, this means that the maker's warranty is void, and the manufacturer is not liable for any damage to the gun or personal injury if handloaded ammunition is used that exceeded established limits for a particular arm. This arises because firearm manufacturers point out that while they have some influence and scope for redress with ammunition manufacturers, they have no such influence over the actions of incompetent or overly ambitious individuals who assemble ammunition.

=== United States ===
In the United States, handloading is not only legal and requires no permit, but is also quite popular. Experts point to potential legal liabilities (depending on the jurisdiction) that the shooter may incur if using handloaded ammunition for defense, such as an implied malice on the part of the shooter, as the use of handloaded ammunition may give the impression that "regular bullets weren't deadly enough". Additionally, forensic reconstruction of a shooting relies on using identical ammunition from the manufacturer, where handloaded ammunition cannot be guaranteed identical to the ammunition used in the shooting, since "the defendant literally manufactured the evidence". In particular, powder residue patterning is used by law enforcement to validate the distance between the firearm and the person shot using known facts from the manufacturer about powder type, content, and other factors.

=== Canada ===
Handloading is legal in Canada. The Explosives Act places limits on the amount of powder (either smokeless or black) that may be stored in a building, on the manner in which it is stored, and on how much powder may be available for use at any time. The Act is the responsibility of Natural Resources Canada. If the quantity of powder stored for personal use exceeds 75 kg, then a Propellant Magazine Licence (Type P) is required. There is no limit on the number of primers that may be stored for non-commercial use.

=== Germany ===
As an example of a European country, handloading in Germany requires a course, terminated in an exam, in handloading and handling of explosive propellants; often, this is offered in combination with a course and exam in muzzle-loading and black powder-shooting. The State's Ministry of the Interior conducts the exam. When passed and the reloader can provide a reason for his will to reload ("Bedürfnisprüfung"), he can apply for a permit to a quota of propellant for five years (after which time he has to extend the permit). Every propellant is recorded in the permit. Primers, cartridges, bullets, and reloading equipment are available without a permit.

As German law gives maximum pressures for every commercial caliber, the handloader is allowed to non-commercially give away his ammunition. He is liable for incorrect loading. His references are data books by propellant manufacturers (like RWS), bullet manufacturers (like Speer), reloading tool manufacturers (like Lyman) or neutral manufacturers institutions like the DEVA. Firearms manufacturers give guarantees as long as the handloaded ammunition is within the correct parameters.

The relevant rules for non-commercial application can be found in §27 of the Explosives Act ("Sprengstoffgesetz").

In order to investigate gun destruction – material fault or incorrectly loaded ammunition – and for handloaders to get data for new loads, gun and/or handloaded cartridges can be sent to the DEVA institute (German institute for testing and examining of hunting and sporting guns); the DEVA returns a pressure diagram and a report whether this load is within legal range for this ammunition.

=== South Africa ===
Handloading or reloading is allowed in South Africa as long as the reloader is in possession of a competency certificate to possess a firearm as well as a license to possess such a firearm. Sport shooters load to make shooting sports more affordable and hunters load to obtain greater accuracy. Powder and primers are strictly controlled by law and can not exceed for 2 kg for powder and 2400 primers. The amount of ammunition a person may have in their possession is also limited to 200 rounds per chambering. If the reloader is a registered dedicated sportsman, the quantities are unlimited, although storage of excess amounts of powder is dangerous due to the potential of fire occurring from accidental ignition. A manual from a South African powder manufacturer Rheinmetall Denel Munition (previously Somchem) is available for reloaders with adequate information and guidelines.

== Atypical handloading ==
Berdan primers, with their off-center flash holes and lack of self-contained anvil, are more difficult to work with than the easily removed Boxer primers. The primers may be punctured and pried out from the rear, or extracted with hydraulic pressure. Primers must be selected carefully, as there are more sizes of Berdan primers than the standard large and small pistol, large and small rifle of Boxer primers. The case must also be inspected carefully to make sure the anvil has not been damaged because this could result in a failure to fire.

Rimfire cartridges (e.g. 22 Long Rifle) are not generally hand-loaded in modern times, although there are some shooters that unload commercial rimfire cartridges, and use the primed case to make their own loads or to generate special rimfire wildcat cartridges. These cartridges are highly labor-intensive to produce. Historically, liquid priming material was available for reloading rimfire ammunition, but the extreme explosive hazard of bulk primer compound and complexity of the process (including "ironing out" the firing pin strike) caused the practice to decline.

Some shooters desiring to reload for obsolete rimfire cartridges alter the firearm in question to function as a centerfire, which allows them to reload. Often it is possible to reform cases from similarly sized ammunition which is in production, and this is the most economical way of obtaining brass for obscure or out-of-production calibers. Even if custom brass must be manufactured, this is often far less expensive than purchasing rare, out-of-production ammunition. Cartridges like the 56-50 Spencer, for example, are not readily obtainable in rimfire form, but can be made from shortened 50-70 cartridges or even purchased in loaded form from specialty dealers.

An unusual solution to the problem of obtaining ammunition for the very old pinfire cartridges is even available. This solution uses specialized cartridges that use a removable pin and anvil which hold a percussion cap of the type use in caplock firearms. To reload a fired case, the pin is removed, allowing the anvil to slide out; a percussion cap is placed in the anvil, it is re-inserted, and the pin serves to lock the anvil in place, as well as to ignite the percussion cap.

Shotshell reloading is sometimes done for scattershot loads, consisting of multiple wads separating groups of shot, which are intended for use at short-distance hunting of birds. Similarly, shotshell reloading for buckshot loads and non-lethal "bean bag" loads are sometimes handloaded. These types of shotshells are rarely handloaded.

== Accuracy considerations ==
Precision and consistency are key to developing accurate ammunition. Various methods are used to ensure that ammunition components are as consistent as possible. Since the firearm is also a variable in the accuracy equation, careful tuning of the load to a particular firearm can yield significant accuracy improvements.

=== Cases ===
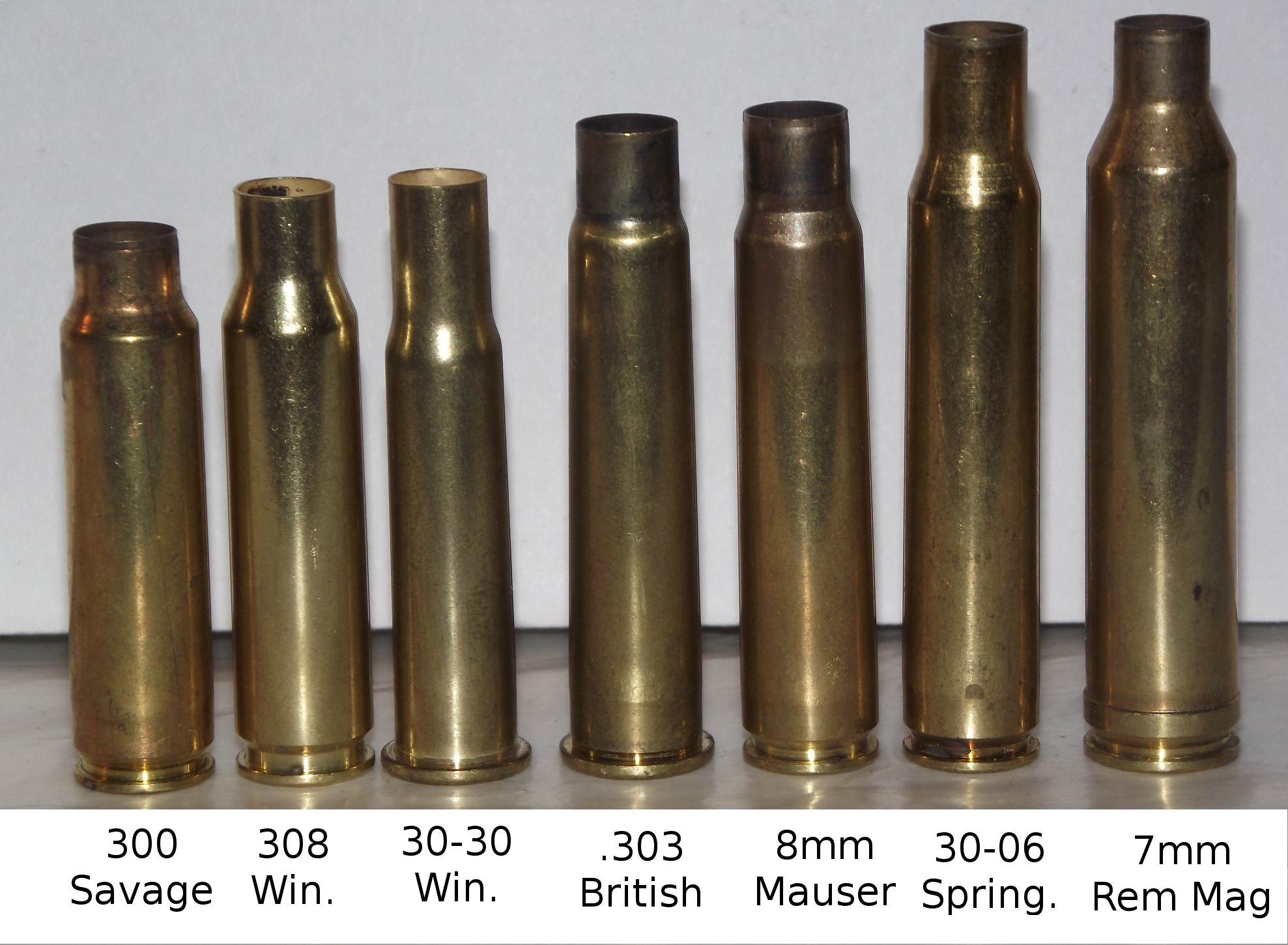
Common Rifle Casings

The internal volume of the cartridge case, or case capacity, significantly affects the pressure developed during ignition, which significantly affects the velocity of the bullet. Cases from different manufacturers can vary in wall thickness, and as cases are repeatedly fired and reloaded the brass flows up to the neck and is trimmed off, increasing capacity as well as weakening the case. The first step to ensuring consistent case capacity is sorting the cases by headstamp, so each lot of cases is from the same manufacturer and/or year. A further step would be to then weigh these cases, and sort by case weight.

The neck of the case is another variable since this determines how tightly the bullet is held in place during ignition. Inconsistent neck thickness and neck tension will result in variations in pressure during ignition. These variables can be addressed by annealing and thinning the neck, as well as by careful control of the crimping operation.

=== Bullets ===
Bullets must be well-balanced and consistent in weight, shape, and seating depth to ensure that they correctly engage the rifling, exit the barrel at a consistent velocity, and fly straight. Measurement of the weight is the easiest, and bullets that are out of round can be detected by rotating the bullet in a concentricity or runout gauge. Additionally, devices are available that will detect variations in jacket thickness and internal voids in jacketed rifle bullets, though such devices are relatively expensive. Bullets manufactured by high-quality sources will help ensure consistency. For ultimate accuracy however some shooters will measure even the best bullets and reject all but the most consistent.

The transition from the case to the barrel is also very important. If the bullets have to travel a varying distance from the case to the point where they engage the rifling, then this can result in variations in pressure and velocity. The bearing surface of the bullet should ideally be seated as close as possible to the rifling. Since it is the bearing surface that matters here, it is important that the bullets have a consistent bearing surface.

=== Load tuning ===
Tuning load to a gun can also yield great increases in accuracy, especially for standard, non-accurized rifles. Different rifles, even of the same make and model, will often react to the same ammunition in different ways. The handloader is afforded a wider selection of bullet weights than can readily be found in commercially loaded ammunition, and there are many different powders that can be used for any given cartridge. Trying a range of bullets and a variety of powders will determine what combination of bullet and powder gives the most consistent velocities and accuracies. Careful adjustment of the amount of powder can give the velocity that best fits the natural harmonics of the barrel (see accurize and internal ballistics). For ultimate accuracy and performance, the handloader also has the option of using a wildcat cartridge; wildcats are the result of shaping the cartridge and chamber themselves to a specific end, and the results push the envelope of velocity, energy, and accuracy. Most, but not all, reloads perform best when the powder selected fills 95% or more of the case (by volume).

== Cost considerations ==
Those who reload with the primary goal of maximizing accuracy or terminal performance may end up paying more per reloaded round than for commercial ammunition—this is especially true for military calibers which are commonly available as surplus. Maximum performance, however, requires the highest quality components, which are usually the most expensive. Reloaders who reload with the primary goal of saving money on ammunition, however, can make a few tradeoffs to realize significant cost savings with a minimal sacrifice in quality.

=== Case life maximization ===
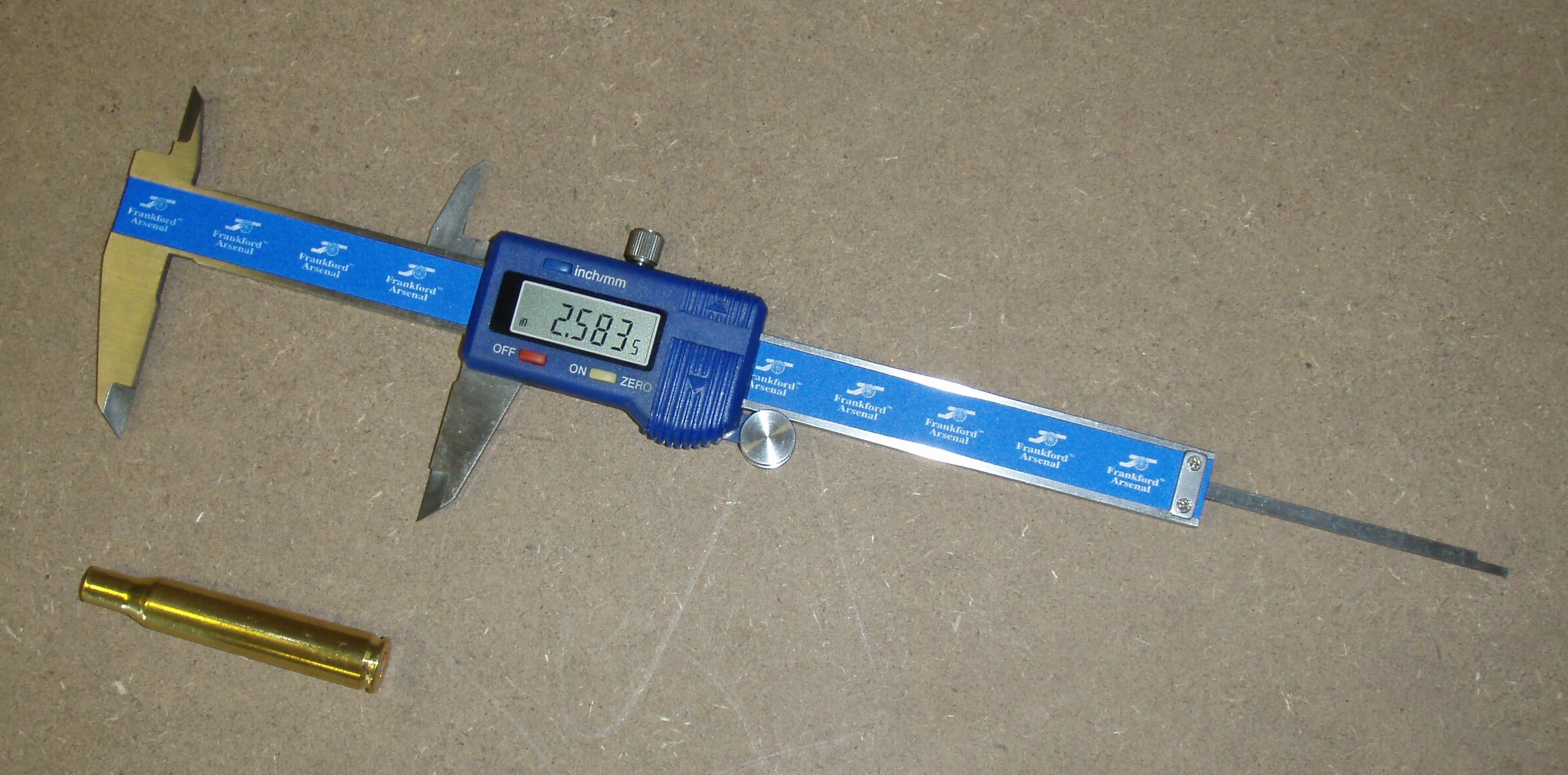
Digital calipers for measuring case length

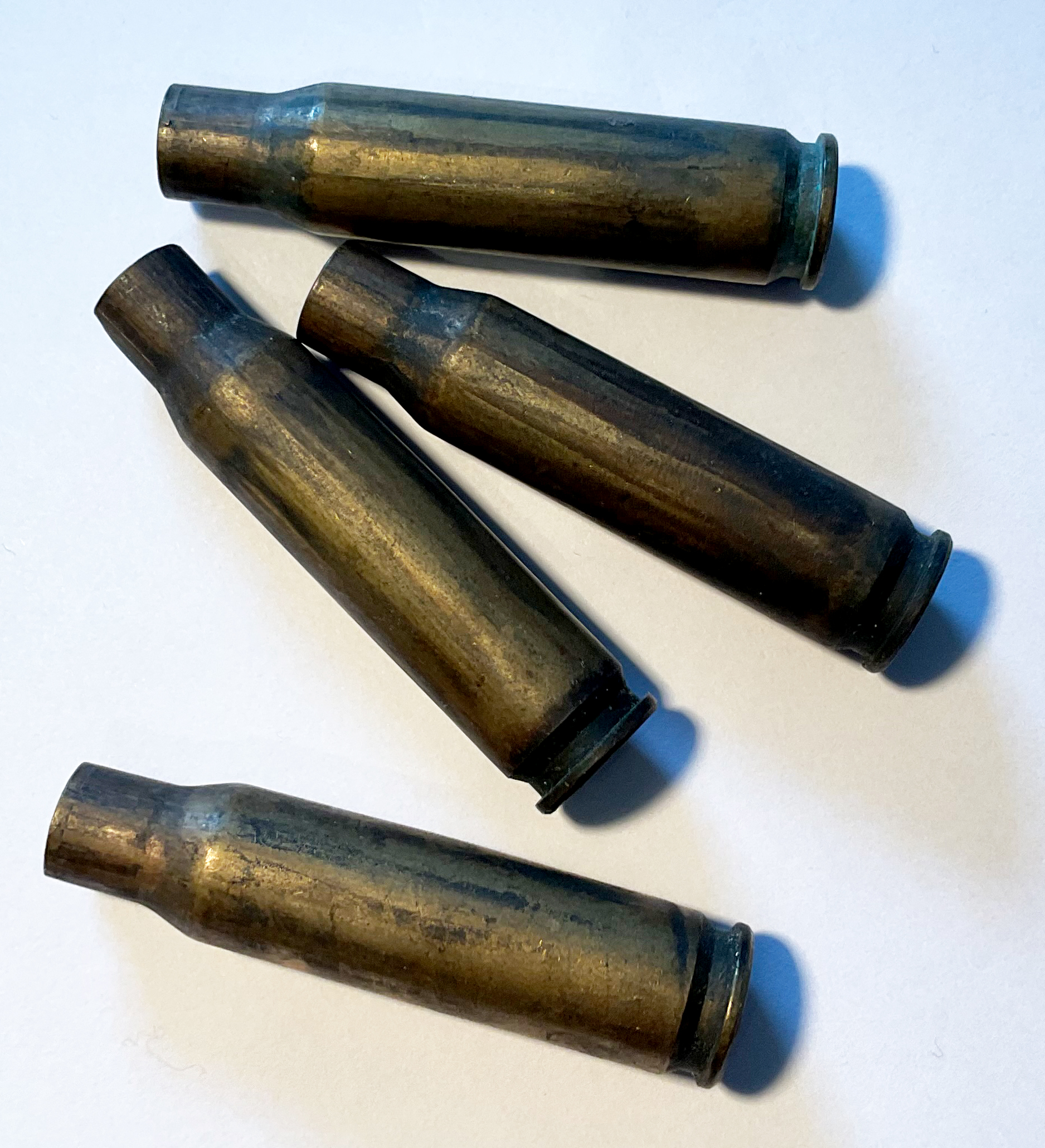
Fired G3 cartridge cases with typical scorch marks at the front outer surface caused by intentional propellant gas ingress at the longitudinal gas relief flutes that are cut in the chamber wall. The "flute stripes" can be ironed out with a full-length sizing die

Since the case is the single most expensive part of a loaded round, the more times a case can be re-used, the better. Cases that are loaded to a moderate pressure will generally last longer, as they will not be work hardened or flow under pressure as much as cases loaded to higher pressures. Use of moderate pressure loads extends the life of the case significantly, not to mention saving quite a bit of wear and tear on the barrel. Work hardening can cause cracks to occur in the neck as the hardened brass loses its malleability, and is unable to survive swaging back into shape during the resizing operation. Rifle brass tends to flow towards the neck (this is why rifle brass must be trimmed periodically) and this takes brass away from the rear of the case. Eventually, this will show as a bright ring near the base of the cartridge, just in front of the thick web of brass at the base. If brass is used after this ring appears, it risks a crack, or worse, a complete head separation, which will leave the forward portion of the brass lodged in the chamber of the gun. This generally requires a special stuck case removal tool to extract, so it is very undesirable to have a head separation.

With bottlenecked cartridge cases, choosing the right sizing die can also be important. Full-length sizing of cartridges is often thought to greatly shorten case life by work hardening the full length of the case, which can cause the case neck to split, although some studies show that the number of reloads possible with a case is essentially the same for either full length sizing as for neck sizing only if the issue is one of neck hardening. If the reloaded cartridges are going to be used in the same firearm in which they were previously fired, though, and if that firearm has a bolt action or other action with a strong camming action on closing, then full-length resizing may not be needed. A collet neck sizing die can be used to size just the case neck enough to hold the bullet and leave the rest of the case unsized. The resulting cartridge will chamber into the specific rifle that previously fired it, though the fit might be tight and require more force to chamber than a full-length resized case. The use of a neck-sizing die in conjunction with moderate pressure loads may extend the life of the case significantly by minimizing the amount of case that is work hardened or stretched. This is especially true for reloads intended for military rifles with intentionally large chambers such as the Lee–Enfield in .303 British. The use of partial length or neck sizing for cartridges used in such large chambers permits effectively switching the headspacing from relying on the rim of a rimmed cartridge to the shoulder of the bottleneck transition instead, increasing the number of times a rimmed military cartridge can be reloaded from once to perhaps 5 or more times, all while avoiding dangerous incipient head separations. One final form of limiting case wear is limited strictly to benchrest shooters with custom-cut chambers. The chamber of these rifles is cut so that there is just enough room, typically just a few thousandths of an inch, in the neck area. The result of using this type of chamber is that fired rounds do not require any resizing whatsoever once the case is fired. The brass will 'spring back' a bit after firing, and will properly hold a new bullet without further manipulation. Some refer to this as a 'fitted' neck, however, it is a function of both the carefully cut precision neck and the case adjusted to fit with very little clearance.

Work hardening happens to all cases, even low-pressure handgun cases. The sudden increase in pressure upon firing hits the brass like a hammer, changing its crystalline structure and making it more brittle. The neck of the case, if it becomes too brittle, will be incapable of standing the strain of resizing, expanding, crimping, and firing, and will split during loading or firing. Since the case neck remains in tension while holding the bullet in place, aging ammunition may develop split necks in storage. While a neck split during firing is not a significant danger, a split neck will render the case incapable of holding the bullet in place, so the case must be discarded or recycled as a wildcat cartridge of shorter overall length, allowing the split section to be removed. The simplest way to decrease the effects of work hardening is to decrease the pressure in the case. Loading to the minimum power level listed in the reloading manual, instead of the maximum, can significantly increase case life. Slower powders generally also have lower pressure peaks and may be a good choice.

Annealing brass to make it softer and less brittle is fairly easy, but annealing cartridge cases is a more complex matter. Since the base of the case must be hard, it cannot be annealed. What is needed is a form of heat treatment called differential hardening, where heat is carefully applied to part of the case until the desired softness is reached, and then the heat treatment process is halted by rapidly cooling the case. Since annealing brass requires heating it to about 660 °F (350 °C), the heating must be done in such a way as to heat the neck to that temperature, while preventing the base of the case from being heated and losing its hardness. The traditional way is to stand the cases in a shallow pan full of water, then heat the necks of the cases with a torch, but this method makes it difficult to get an even heating of the entire case neck. A temperature-sensitive crayon can be used at the point to which it is to be annealed, which is just behind the shoulder for bottlenecked cartridges, or at the bottom of the bullet seating depth for straight-wall cartridges. The neck of the case is placed in a propane torch flame and heated it until the crayon mark changes color, indicating the correct temperature. Once the correct temperature is reached the case is completely quenched in water to stop the annealing process at the desired hardness. Failing to keep the base of the case cool can anneal the case near the head, where it must remain hard to function properly. Another approach is to immerse the case mouth in a molten alloy of lead that is at the desired annealing temperature for a few seconds, then quickly shake off the lead and quench the case.

Cases that have small cracks at the neck may not be a complete loss. Many cartridges, both commercial and wildcats, can be made by shortening a longer cartridge. For example, a 223 Remington can be shortened to become a .222 Remington, which can further be shortened to become a .221 Fireball. Similarly, .30-06 Springfield can become .308 Winchester, which can become any number of specialized benchrest shooting cartridges. Since the cracking is likely due to a brittle neck, the cases should be annealed before attempting to reform them, or the crack may propagate and ruin the newly formed shorter case as well.

=== Powder cost minimization ===
Powder is another significant cost of reloading, and one over which the handloader has significant control. In addition to the obvious step of using a minimum charge, rather than a full power one, significant cost savings may be obtained through careful powder choice. Given the same bullet and cartridge, a faster burning powder will generally use a smaller charge of powder than required with a slower powder. For example, a 44 Magnum firing a 240-grain lead semi-wadcutter could be loaded with either Accurate Arms #2, a very fast pistol powder, or #9, a very slow pistol powder. When using the minimum loads, 9.0 grains (0.58 g) of AA #2 yield a velocity of 1126 ft/s (343 m/s), and 19.5 grains (1.26 g) of #9 yield 1364 ft/s (416 m/s). For the same amount of powder, AA #2 can produce approximately twice as many rounds, yet both powders cost the same per weight.

The tradeoff comes in terms of power and accuracy; AA #2 is designed for small cases and will burn inconsistently in the large 44 Magnum case. AA #9, however, will fill the case much better, and the slow burn rate of AA #9 is ideal for magnum handgun rounds, producing 20% higher velocities (at maximum levels) while still producing less pressure than the fast-burning AA #2. A medium-burning powder might actually be a better choice, as it could split the difference in powder weights while delivering more power and accuracy than the fastest powder.

One solution that is applicable to revolvers, in particular, is the possibility of using a reduced-volume case. Cartridges such as 357 Magnum and 44 Magnum are just longer versions of their parent rounds of .38 Special and .44 Special, and the shorter rounds will fire in the longer chambers with no problems. The reduced case capacity allows greater accuracy with even lighter loads. A 44 Special loaded with a minimum load of AA #2 uses only 4.2 grains (0.27 g) of powder, and produces a modest 771 ft/s (235 m/s).

When reloading .38 Special and .44 Special, extreme care must be exercised to not exceed maximum powder specifications - i.e. a 357 Magnum load must never be used in a .38 special case, as even though the powder charge may fit, the difference in case volumes will likely create an overpressure scenario resulting in unsafe conditions.

== Bullets ==
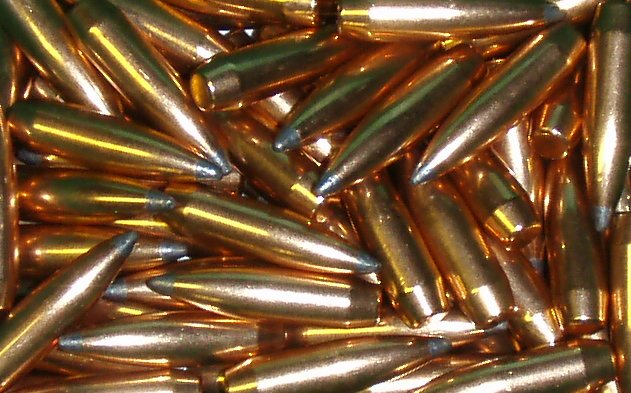
27-Caliber Sierra Bullets

While the case is usually the most expensive component of a cartridge, the bullet is usually the most expensive part of the reloaded round, especially with handgun ammunition. It is also the best place to save money with handgun ammunition. This is because the bullets are used one time, and the case lasts for many reloadings.

Other advantages of casting or swaging bullets from lead wire (which is pricier but avoids many quality-control issues of casting) is the ability to precisely control many attributes of the resulting bullet. Custom bullet molds are available from a number of sources, allowing the handloader to pick the exact weight, shape, and diameter of the bullet to fit the cartridge, firearm, and intended use. A good example of where this is useful is for shooters of older military surplus firearms, which often exhibit widely varying bore and groove diameters; by making bullets specifically intended for the firearm in question, the accuracy of the resulting cartridges can be significantly increased.

=== Casting ===
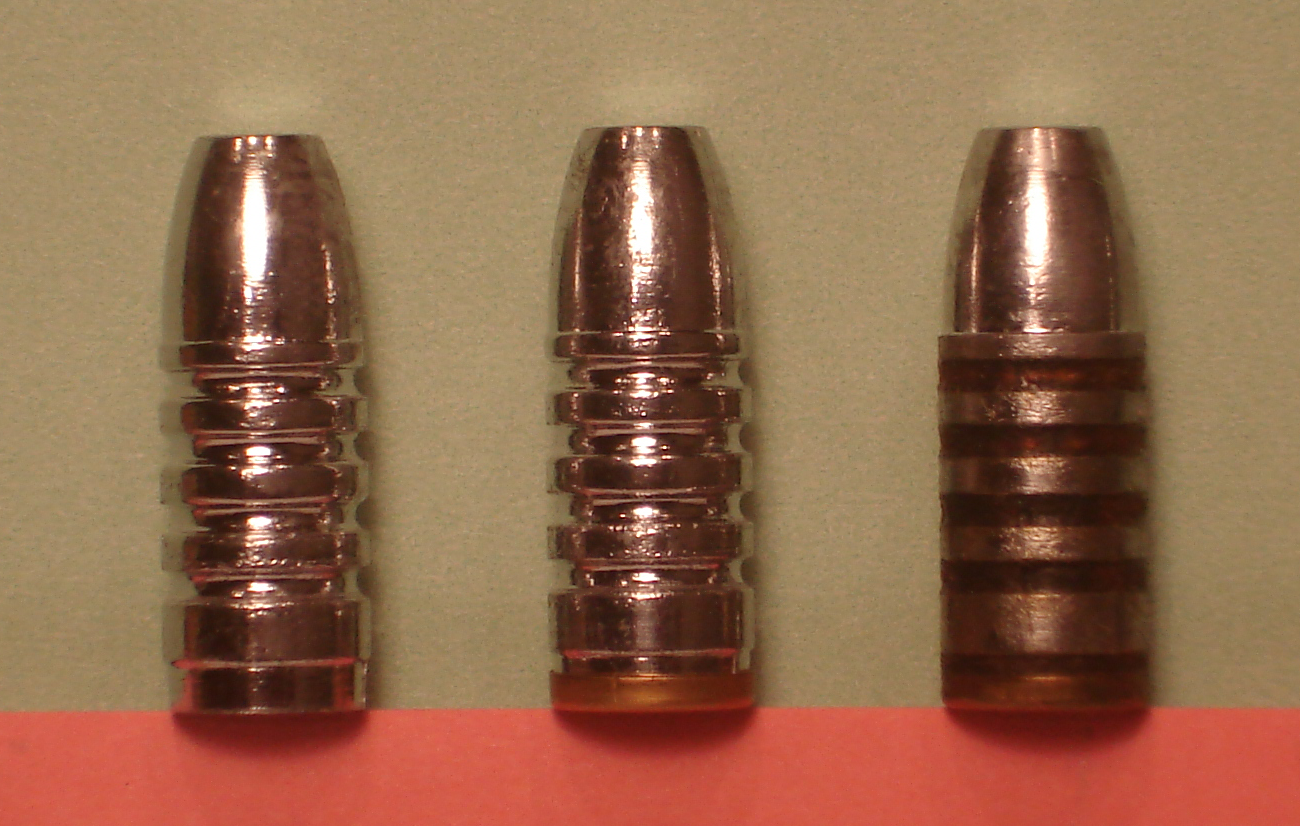
Cast bullets as cast (left), with gas check (center) and lubricated (right).

The cheapest method of obtaining bullets, buckshot, and slugs intended for reloading use at low to moderate velocities is casting them. This requires a set of bullet, buckshot, or slug molds, which are available from a number of sources, and a source of known quality lead. Linotype and automotive wheelweights are often used as sources of lead that are blended together in a molten state to achieve the desired Brinell hardness. Other sources of scrap lead, such as recovered bullets, lead cable sheathing, lead pipe, or even lead–acid battery plates (EXTREME caution should be used as modern battery components, when melted, can yield hazardous, even deadly gases), can yield usable lead with some degree of effort, including purification and measuring of hardness.

Cast bullets are also the cheapest bullets to buy, though generally only handgun bullets are available in this form. Some firearms manufacturers, such as those using polygonal rifling like Glock and H&K, advise against the use of cast bullets. For shooters who would like to shoot cast bullets, aftermarket barrels are generally available for these models with conventional rifling, and the cost of the barrel can generally be recouped in ammunition savings after a few thousand rounds.

Soft lead bullets are generally used in handguns with velocities of 1000 ft/s (300 m/s) or lower, while harder cast bullets may be used, with careful powder selection, in rifles with velocities of 2000 ft/s (600 m/s) or slightly more. A modern solution to velocity limitations of cast projectiles is to powder coat the projectile, encasing it in a protective skin allowing higher velocities to be achieved with softer lead alloys with no lead build up in the firearm. The limit is the point at which the powder gas temperature and pressure starts to melt the base of the bullet, and leave a thin coating of molten and re-solidified lead in the bore of the gun—a process called leading the bore. Cast lead bullets may also be fired in full power magnum handgun rounds like the 44 Magnum with the addition of a gas check, which is a thin aluminum, zinc or copper washer or cup that is crimped over a tiny heel on the base of appropriate cast bullets. This provides protection for the base of the bullet, and allows velocities of over 1500 ft/s (450 m/s) in handguns, with little or no leading of the bore.

Such cast lead bullets, intended for use with a gas check, will have a reduced diameter at the rear of the cast lead bullet, onto which the gas check can be swaged using a lubricating/resizing press. All cast lead bullets, whether with or without a gas check, must still be lubricated, to prevent leading of the rifling of the barrel. A lubricating/resizing press, which is a special purpose bullet processing press, can be either a standalone press dedicated to lubricating and resizing bullets, or can be an add-on to a reloading press, at the option of the handloader. Not all handloaders resize cast lead bullets, although all handloaders do lubricate cast lead bullets. An option to using a lubricating press is simply to coat the bullets with bullet lube, which can be done either with a spray, in a tumbler, in a plastic bowel with a liquid lube, in a tray with melted bullet lube, or even with a manual lubricating process.

Slugs for shotgun shells are also commonly cast from pure lead by handloaders, for subsequent reloading into shotgun shells. Although roll crimps of shotgun hull cases are commonly used for handloading these cast lead slugs, in place of the fold crimps that are used when reloading shot into shotgun shells, some published recipes specifically do include fold crimps. For published recipes using fold crimps and shot wads used as sabots, slugs can be easily reloaded using standard shotshell presses and techniques, without requiring any roll crimp tools. Whether roll crimps or fold crimps are used, cast lead slugs are commonly used in jurisdictions where rifles are banned for hunting, under the reasoning that fired slugs will not travel but over short distances, unlike rifle bullets which can travel up to several miles when fired. Use of cast lead slugs is therefore very common when hunting large game near populated areas.

Similarly, cast lead buckshot is often cast by handloaders, for reloading into shotgun shells for hunting larger game animals. Such buckshot is then placed by hand into shotgun shells when handloaded, due to the necessity of having to stack the buckshot balls into specific configurations depending on the gauge of shotgun shell being reloaded, the choice of wad, the volume of powder, and the size of the buckshot (e.g., 00, 000, 0000 buckshot). Such cast lead buckshot is never simply dropped from a shotshell press charge bar into a shotgun shell when reloading.

=== Swaging ===
Most shooters prefer jacketed bullets, especially in rifles and pistols. The hard jacket material, generally copper or brass, resists deformation and handles far higher pressures and temperatures than lead. Several companies offer swaging presses (both manual and hydraulic) that will manufacture on a small scale jacketed bullets that can rival or surpass the quality of commercial jacketed bullets. Two swaging equipment manufacturers offer equipment and dies designed to turn 22 Long Rifle cases into brass jackets for 22 caliber (5.56 mm) bullets.

Example variants of swage dies include:

- R dies, used for bullet swaging in the reloading press. No expensive special press is needed; however, the reloading press cannot swage all calibers and variants of bullets.
- S dies, steel dies for a manual press. They have a maximum caliber of .458 inches (11.6 mm) and a maximum jacket length of 1.3 inches (33 mm).
- H dies, dies designed for hydraulic presses and are offered in calibers up to 25 millimetres (0.98 in) and jacket lengths of more than 1.3". In a hydraulic press, bullets from powdered metal can be swaged.

Every bullet diameter and most bullet types require specific dies. Because of this, starting a bullet swaging operation requires a significant cost for equipment.

=== Purchased Bullets ===
Handloaders have the choice to swage but most choose to purchase pre-made jacketed bullets, due to the obscure nature of swaging and the specialized, expensive equipment. The process of manufacturing a jacketed bullet is far more complex than for a cast bullet; first, the jacket must be punched from a metal sheet of precise thickness, filled with a premeasured lead core, and then swaged into shape with a high pressure press in multiple steps. This involved process makes jacketed bullets far more expensive on average than cast bullets. Further complicating this are the requirements for controlled expansion bullets (see terminal ballistics), which require a tight bond between the jacket and the core. Premium expanding bullets are, with match grade bullets, at the top tier in expense.

=== Plated Bullets ===
A more economical alternative was made available to the handloader in the 1980s, the copper-plated bullet. Copper-plated bullets are lead bullets that are electroplated with a copper jacket. While thinner than a swaged bullet jacket, the plated jacket is far thicker than normal electroplate, and provides significant structural integrity to the bullet. Since the jacket provides the strength, soft lead can be used, which allows bullets to be swaged or cast into shape before plating. While not strong enough for most rifle cartridges, plated bullets work well in many handgun rounds, with a recommended maximum velocity of 1250 ft/s (375 m/s). Plated bullets fall between cast and traditional jacketed bullets in price.

While originally sold only to handloaders as an inexpensive substitute for jacketed bullets, the plated bullet has come far. The ammunition manufacturer Speer now offers the Gold Dot line, commercially loaded premium handgun ammunition using copper-plated hollow point bullets. The strong bond between jacket and core created by the electroplating process makes expanding bullets hold together very well, and the Gold Dot line is now in use by many police departments.

== See also ==
- Pacific Tool Company
- Table of handgun and rifle cartridges

== Citations ==
- Nonte Jr., George C. (1978). Basic Handloading. New York: Outdoor Life. LCCN 77026482.
