= Firearm propellant =

Type of propellant

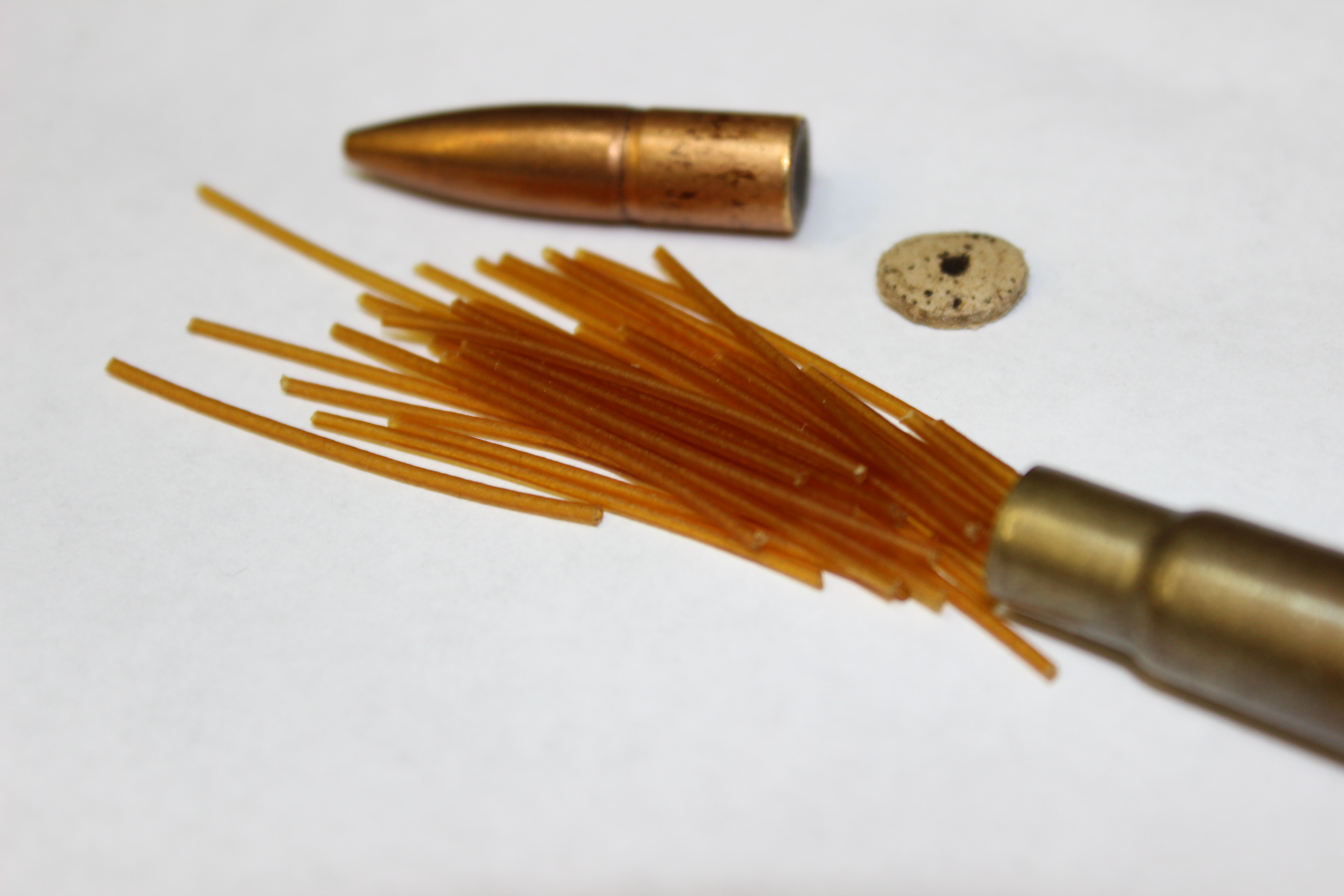
Cordite is a type of firearm propellant using shaped pieces rather than a powder form.

Firearm propellants are a specialized type of propellant used to discharge a projectile (typically a bullet, slug, or pellets) through the barrel of a firearm. Mixtures of different chemical substances are often used to control the rate of gas release, or prevent decomposition of the propellant prior to use. Short-barrel firearms such as handguns necessitate faster-burning propellants to obtain sufficient muzzle energy, while long guns typically use slower-burning propellants. The pressure relationships between propellant chemical reactions and bullet response are described as internal ballistics.

== Powder ==
Although all firearm propellants are generally called powder, the term gunpowder originally described mixtures of charcoal and sulfur with potassium nitrate as an oxidizing agent. By the 20th century these early propellants were largely replaced by smokeless powder of nitrocellulose or similarly nitrated organic compounds.

=== Black powder ===
The oldest gun propellant was black powder, a low explosive made from a mixture of sulfur, charcoal, and potassium nitrate. It was invented in China during the 9th century as one of Four Great Inventions, and still remains in occasional use as a solid propellant for antique firearms. Availability of black powder allowed invention of firearms about 1300 AD. While a mixture of charcoal and potassium nitrate will react without sulfur, sulfur makes the mixture easier to ignite. Early difficulties obtaining pure potassium nitrate caused historical variation in the relative proportions of the three ingredients. Similar propellants have been formulated mixing sulfur and carbonaceous materials with other oxidizing chemicals including sodium nitrate, ammonium nitrate, or various chlorates; but they proved less satisfactory for use in firearms.

=== Smokeless powder ===
Modern firearm propellants tend to be smokeless powders based on nitrocellulose or similarly nitrated organic compounds, first invented in the late 19th century as a cleaner and better-performing replacement for black powder. Modern smokeless powder may be corned into small spherical balls, or extruded into cylinders or strips with many cross-sectional shapes using solvents such as ether, which can be cut into short ("flakes") or long pieces ("cords").

=== Bulk powder ===
Black powder produces gas at a predictable rate unaffected by pressure, while the gas production rate of smokeless powder increases with increasing pressure. The possibility of runaway pressures caused smokeless powder to destroy many firearms designed for black powder and required much more precise measurement of propellant charges. Bulk powders were intended to offer advantages of smokeless powder for use in firearms designed for black powder. Charges of bulk powder are loaded in the same volume appropriate for black powder. Early formulations including partially nitrated cellulose with potassium nitrate or barium nitrate were more successful in shotguns than in rifles. Nitrocellulose produces greater volumes of gas per volume of solid than black powder does, so nitrocellulose bulk powders were less dense than later smokeless powders. Nitrocellulose bulk powders designed for early straight-sided black powder rifle cartridges like the .32-40 and .38-55 were friable and easily crumbled. The increased surface area of crumbled grains could produce unsafe pressures through faster gas production. Nitrocellulose bulk powders have been discontinued in favor of bulk powder formulations like Pyrodex.

== Characteristics ==
The performance characteristics of a propellant are greatly influenced by its grain size and shape, because the specific surface area influences the burn rate, which in turn influences the rate of pressurization. While other powders may be formed by crushing or pulverizing solids into very small pieces, firearm propellants are typically manufactured in grains of geometric shapes to physically control rate of gas production in accordance with Piobert's law. Shotgun and handgun propellants may be flakes, while Improved Military Rifle propellants were extruded as short cylindrical tubes, and ball propellants are small spheres.

== Mechanism ==
Many propellants use exothermic reactions to generate gaseous carbon monoxide, nitrogen and steam while raising temperatures to increase pressure. The propellant reaction is initiated by a primer. Pressure initially increases as the propellant is converted to gas, but starts to decrease as the bullet accelerates down the barrel to create a larger volume for the expanding gas. The accelerating force difference between chamber pressure behind the bullet and exterior pressure is initially reduced by static friction to move the bullet out of the cartridge casing into the barrel and then by sliding friction as the bullet moves down the barrel. Pressure in small arms typically peaks between one-half and one millisecond after ignition. Handgun propellants may reach peak pressure before the bullet leaves the cartridge case, while rifle propellants may move a bullet several inches before reaching peak pressure. The motion and behavior characteristics of projectiles while under the influence of the gases produced by the propellant is known as internal ballistics.

Due to the relatively short distance a gun barrel can offer, the sealed acceleration time is very limited and only a small proportion of the total energy generated by the propellant combustion will get transferred to the projectile. The residual energy in the propellant gases gets dissipated to the surrounding in the form of heat, vibration/deformation, light (in the form of muzzle flash) and a prominent muzzle blast (which is responsible for the loud sound/concussive shock perceivable to bystanders and most of the recoil felt by the shooter, as well as potentially deflecting the bullet), or as unusable kinetic energy transferred to other ejecta byproducts (e.g. unburnt powders, dislodged foulings).

== Types of propellant ==
- Black powder
- Smokeless powder
- Cordite
- Brown powder
- Shimose powder
