= High brass =

High brass may refer to:

- High brass, a categorization of brass instruments
- a firearms term for a shotgun shell for more powerful loads
