= Glossary of firearms terms =

The following are terms related to firearms and ammunition topics.

== A ==
accurize
accurizing

The process of altering a stock firearm to improve its accuracy.
Ackley Improved

A type of firearm cartridge that underwent a process of fireforming to contain more propellant to improve the performance of the round. The term may also refer to cutting down the cartridge to contain a different caliber of projectile.
action

The physical mechanism that manipulates cartridges and/or seals the breech. The term refers to the method in which cartridges are loaded, locked, and extracted from the mechanism. Actions are generally categorized by the type of mechanism used. A firearm action is technically not present on muzzleloaders as all loading is done by hand. The mechanism that fires a muzzleloader is called the lock.
adjustable sight
Any aiming mechanism, usually iron sights, that allow the user to move the reticle up or down (elevation), and left or right (windage), in order to compensate for wind and distance.
ammo
ammunition

Can be described as anything that can be launched or thrown. In the case of modern firearms, usually refers to the assembly that is made up of a brass, steel, aluminum, or (rarely) a polymer case. The case contains the priming compound, usually in its own removable assembly called a primer. The case will also contain the charge of smokeless gunpowder, or sometimes black powder, and will be topped off by the projectile.
ammo belt
ammunition belt

anti-glare
A grooved/textured surface detail found above the barrel to deflect light from affecting target acquisition.
anti-reflection device
A scope cap mounted on optical sights with a hexagonal gauze to deflect light that can signal the snipers position away to the enemy and affect camouflage.
arm gun
An arm gun is a type of firearm in which the stock or butt of the weapon is designed to rest along or even strapped to the user's forearm rather than against their shoulder. Such guns are usually built in a bullpup configuration and are designed to be lightweight and compact.
assault rifle

A service rifle capable of select fire, that fires intermediate cartridges.
assault weapon

A term used in some jurisdictions within the United States, usually used to describe semi-automatic rifles that fire from a detachable magazine.
automatic
automatic fire

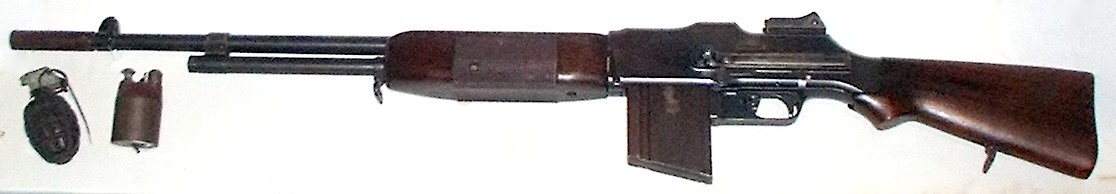
The M1918 BAR, a type of automatic rifle

A weapon capable of automatic fire is one that will continually expend ammunition for as long as the trigger is held.
automatic pistol

A pistol that is capable of automatic fire; a machine pistol.
automatic rifle

A self-loading rifle that is capable of automatic fire.

== B ==
back bore
backbored barrel
A shotgun barrel whose internal diameter is greater than nominal for the gauge, but less than the SAAMI maximum. Done in an attempt to reduce felt recoil, improve patterning, or change the balance of the shotgun.
ballistic coefficient (BC)

A measure of a projectile's ability to overcome air resistance in flight. It is inversely proportional to the deceleration – a high ballistic coefficient indicates a low deceleration. BC is a function of mass, diameter, and drag coefficient.
ballistics

a field of mechanics concerned with the launching, flight behavior and impact effects of projectiles. Often broken down into internal ballistics, transitional ballistics, external ballistics and terminal ballistics.
bandoleer
bandolier
bando

A pocketed belt for holding ammunition and cartridges, usually slung across the chest. Bandoliers are now rare because most military arms use magazines, which are not well-suited to being stored in a bandolier. However, they are still commonly used with shotguns, as a traditional bandolier conveniently stores individual shells.
barrel

A tube, usually metal, through which a controlled explosion or rapid expansion of gases are released to propel a projectile out of the end at high velocity.
barrel nut
A firearm component used on barrels. On handguards, a barrel nut may refer to the component that holds the handguards to the barrel. On machine guns, a barrel nut is a screw on component at the rear of the barrel that has locking lugs and a notch for quick barrel change and helps install it in the trunnion.
battle rattle
Although associated with soldiers personal equipment, the term is used on loosely fitted parts/accessories on the weapon that "rattle" around during movement.
battle rifle

A service rifle capable of semi-automatic or fully automatic fire of a full-power rifle cartridge.
bayonet lug

An attachment point at the muzzle end of a long gun for a bayonet.
belt

An ammunition belt is a device used to retain and feed cartridges into some machine guns in place of a magazine.
belted magnum

Any caliber cartridge, generally rifles, using a shell casing with a pronounced "belt" around its base that continues 2 to 4 mm past the extractor groove. This design originated with the British gunmaker Holland & Holland for the purpose of headspacing certain of their more powerful cartridges. Especially the non-shouldered (non-"bottlenecked") magnum rifle cartridges could be pushed too far into the chamber and thus cause catastrophic failure of the gun when fired with excessive headspace; the addition of the belt to the casing prevented this over-insertion.
bipod

A support device that is similar to a tripod or monopod, but with two legs. On firearms, bipods are commonly used on rifles and machine guns to provide a forward rest and reduce motion. The bipod permits the operator to rest the weapon on the ground, a low wall, or other object, reducing fatigue and permitting increased accuracy.
black powder

black powder substitute

A firearm propellant that is designed to reproduce the burning rate and propellant properties of black powder (making it safe for use in black-powder firearms), while providing advantages in one or more areas such as reduced smoke, reduced corrosion, reduced cost, or decreased sensitivity to unintentional ignition.
blank

A type of cartridge for a firearm that contains gunpowder but no bullet or shot. When fired, the blank makes a flash and an explosive sound (report). Blanks are often used for simulation (such as in historical reenactments, theatre and movie special effects), training, and for signaling (see starting pistol). Blank cartridges differ from dummy cartidges, which are used for training or function testing firearms; these contain no primer or gunpowder, and are inert.
blank-firing adapter

Some weapons use an adapter fitted to the muzzle when firing blanks.
blowback

A system of operation for self-loading firearms that obtains power from the motion of the cartridge case as it is pushed to the rear by expanding gases created by the ignition of the powder charge.
blow-forward

A system of operation that pushes the weapon's bolt forwards to eject the bullet and cycle the action.
bluing

A passivation process in which steel is partially protected against rust, and is named after the blue-black appearance of the resulting protective finish. True gun bluing is an electrochemical conversion coating resulting from an oxidizing chemical reaction with iron on the surface selectively forming magnetite (Fe_{3}O_{4}), the black oxide of iron, which occupies the same volume as metallic iron. Bluing is most commonly used by gun manufacturers, gunsmiths, and gun owners to improve the cosmetic appearance of, and provide a measure of corrosion resistance to, their firearms.
bolt

The part of a repeating, breech-loading firearm that blocks the rear opening (breech) of the barrel chamber while the propellant burns, and moves back and forward to facilitate loading/unloading of cartridges from the magazine. The extractor and firing pin are often integral parts of the bolt.
bolt hold-open

A device/method of holding the bolt open, usually for inspection/reloading/barrel cooling/safety purposes.
bolt action

A type of firearm action in which the firearm's bolt is operated manually by the opening and closing of the breech (barrel) with a small handle. As the handle is operated, the bolt is unlocked, the breech is opened, the spent shell casing is withdrawn and ejected, the firing pin is cocked, and a new round/shell (if available) is placed into the breech and the bolt closed.
bolt thrust

The amount of rearward force exerted by the propellant gases on the bolt or breech of a firearm action or breech when a projectile is fired. The applied force has both magnitude and direction, making it a vector quantity.
bore rope

A tool used to clean the barrel of a gun.
boresight

Crude adjustments made to a firearms optical sight, or iron sights, to align the firearm barrel and sights. This method is usually used to pre-align the sights, which makes zeroing (zero drop at XX distance) much faster.
box magazine

A standard magazine that is generally rectangular in shape and used for loading ammunition.
brass
The empty cartridge case.
break-action

A firearm whose barrels are hinged, and rotate perpendicular to the bore axis to expose the breech and allow the loading and/or unloading of ammunition.
breech

The part of a breechloader that is opened for the insertion of ammunition.
breech pressure

buffer

A component that reduces the velocity of recoiling parts (such as the bolt).
bullpup

A firearm configuration in which both the action and magazine are located behind the trigger.
burst mode

A firing mode enabling the shooter to fire a predetermined number of rounds, with a single pull of the trigger.
Browning
1. John Moses Browning, an American firearms designer.
2. Reference to John Moses Browning's firearms designs, some of which include the M2 Browning, Browning Auto-5, and Browning Hi-Power.
bullet

The small metal projectile that is part of a cartridge and is fired through the barrel. Sometimes, but incorrectly, used to refer to a cartridge.
butterknife bolt handle
A term for an ergonomically flat/smooth bolt handle that blends into the receiver of the weapon.
button rifling

A style of rifling that is formed by pulling a manufacturing die made with reverse image of the rifling (the 'button') down the pre-drilled bore of a firearm barrel.

== C ==
caliber (American English)
calibre (British English)

1. (small arms) The internal diameter of a firearm's barrel or a cartridge's bullet, usually expressed in millimeters or hundredths of an inch; in measuring rifled barrels this may be measured across the lands (.303 British) or grooves (.308 Winchester) or; a specific cartridge for which a firearm is chambered, such as .45 ACP or .357 Magnum.
2. (artillery) The length of the barrel expressed in multiples of the barrel's internal bore diameter.
caplock

An obsolete mechanism for discharging a firearm.
captive-piston ammunition
A silenced cartridge that uses a fully cased projectile with a piston behind used to suppress the noise to an extent.
carbine

1. A shortened version of a service rifle, often chambered in a less potent cartridge.
2. A shortened version of the infantryman's musket or rifle suited for use by cavalry.
cartridge

The assembly consisting of a bullet, gunpowder, shell casing, and primer. When counting, it is referred to as a 'round'.
Cartidge Overall Length (COL)

Factory ammunition is loaded to a standard, SAAMI specified, Cartridge Overall Length so that the ammunition will reliably function in all firearms and action types. This specified overall length has nothing to do with optimizing accuracy, and is typically much shorter than the overall length used by handloaders for the same cartridge. For the last several decades, the rule of thumb was the closer you seated the bullet to the lands, the better the accuracy. Currently, it is understood that this is not always true. It is true that some bullets and some rifles perform best when bullets are seated out long enough to touch the lands, but other bullets perform best when they have a certain amount of "jump" to the lands.
caseless ammunition

A type of small arms ammunition that eliminates the cartridge case that typically holds the primer, propellant, and projectile together as a unit.
casket magazine

A quad stack box magazine.
centerfire, center-fire (American English)
centrefire, centre-fire (British English)

A cartridge in which the primer is located in the center of the cartridge case head. Unlike rimfire cartridges, the primer is a separate and replaceable component. The centerfire cartridge has replaced the rimfire in all but the smallest cartridge sizes. Except for low-powered .22 and .17-caliber cartridges and a handful of antiques, all modern pistol, rifle, and shotgun ammunition are centerfire.
chain gun

A type of single-barrelled machine gun or autocannon that uses an external source of power to cycle the weapon.
chamber

The portion of the barrel or firing cylinder in which the cartridge is inserted prior to being fired. Rifles and pistols generally have a single chamber in their barrels, while revolvers have multiple chambers in their cylinders and no chamber in their barrel.
chambering, chambered

Inserting a round into the chamber, either manually or through the action of the weapon.
charger

Commonwealth parlance for a stripper clip, a speedloader that holds several cartridges together in a single unit for easier loading of a firearm's magazine.
charging handle

Device on a firearm which, when operated, results in the hammer or striker being cocked or moved to the ready position.
cheek weld
The section of a (sniper) rifle stock used for the consistent placement of your cheek on the rifle's stock, creating a stable, repeatable head position that aligns your eye perfectly with the sights or scope for clear, accurate shots, preventing neck strain and ensuring fast target acquisition by building muscle memory. On various firearms, a cheek weld can be used as a shield to prevent the recoiling bolt/weapon from accidents such as striking the shooters face (similar to recoil guards on artillery platforms). Most modern designs stand in for using cheek welds as recoil guards using inline as possible ergonomics, receivers/buffer tubes etc to contain moving components preventing such accidents.
choke

A tapered constriction of a shotgun barrel's bore at the muzzle end. Chokes are almost always used with modern hunting and target shotguns, to improve performance.
clip

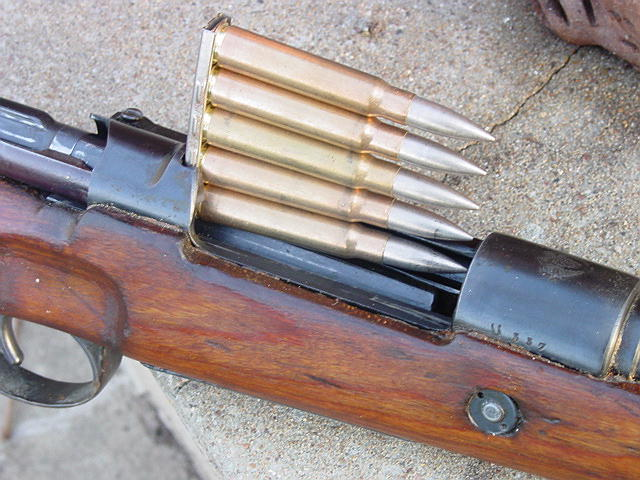
A clip being inserted into a Karabiner 98k

A device that is used to store multiple rounds of ammunition together as a unit, ready for insertion into the magazine of a repeating firearm. This speeds up the process of loading and reloading the firearm as several rounds can be loaded at once, rather than one round being loaded at a time.
close-quarters battle (CQB)
close-quarters combat (CQC)

Close-quarters combat (CQC) or close-quarters battle (CQB) is a type of fighting in which small units engage the enemy with personal weapons at very short range, potentially to the point of hand-to-hand combat or fighting with hand weapons such as swords or knives.
collateral damage

Damage that is unintended or incidental to the intended outcome. The term originated in the United States military, but it has since expanded into broader use.
collimator/collimating sight

A type of optical "blind" sight that allows the user looking into it to see an illuminated aiming point aligned with the device the sight is attached to regardless of eye position (parallax-free). The user can not see through the sight so it is used with both eyes open while one looks into the sight, with one eye open and moving the head to alternately see the sight and then at the target, or using one eye to partially see the sight and target at the same time.
combination gun

A shoulder-held firearm that has two or more barrels; and at least one rifle barrel and one shotgun barrel. Most combination guns are of an over-under design (O/U), in which the two barrels are stacked vertically on top of each other; side-by-side (SxS), in which the two barrels are parallel to one another, are also made.
cooking off

The premature explosion of ammunition, for example when a gun is hot from sustained firing the heat can ignite the propellant and make the weapon fire.
cordite

A family of smokeless propellants developed and produced in the United Kingdom from 1889 to replace gunpowder as a military propellant. Like gunpowder, cordite is classified as a low explosive because of its slow burning rates and consequently low brisance. The hot gases produced by burning gunpowder or cordite generate sufficient pressure to propel a bullet or shell to its target, but not enough to destroy the barrel of the firearm.
cylindro-conoidal bullet

A hollow base bullet, shaped so that when fired, the bullet expands and seals the bore. It was invented by Captain John Norton of the British 34th Regiment in 1832, after he examined the blow pipe arrows used by the natives in India and found that their base was formed of elastic lotus pith, which by its expansion against the inner surface of the blow pipe prevented the escape of air past it.

== D ==
Damascus barrel
Damascus twist
An obsolete method of manufacturing a firearm barrel made by twisting strips of metal around a mandrel and forge welding it into shape. See also Damascus steel.
delayed blowback

A type of blowback operation when fired uses an operation to delay the opening until the gas pressure drops to a safe level to extract.
derringer, deringer

A generic-use term describing a breechloading handgun that typically has one to four barrels. Because of their construction, derringers are much smaller and more concealable than many other types of handguns. The name comes from a misspelling of the original Philadelphia Deringer introduced by Henry Deringer in 1825.
direct impingement

A type of gas operation for a firearm that directs gas from a fired cartridge directly to the bolt carrier or slide assembly to cycle the action.
disassembly
The removal of parts of a firearm, usually as part of a field strip.
discharge
Firing a weapon.
doglock

The lock that preceded the 'true' flintlock in both rifles and pistols in the 17th century. Commonly used throughout Europe in the 1600s, it gained popular favor in the British and Dutch militaries. A doglock carbine was the principal weapon of the harquebusier, the most numerous type of cavalry in the armies of the Thirty Years War and the English Civil War era.
double-barreled shotgun

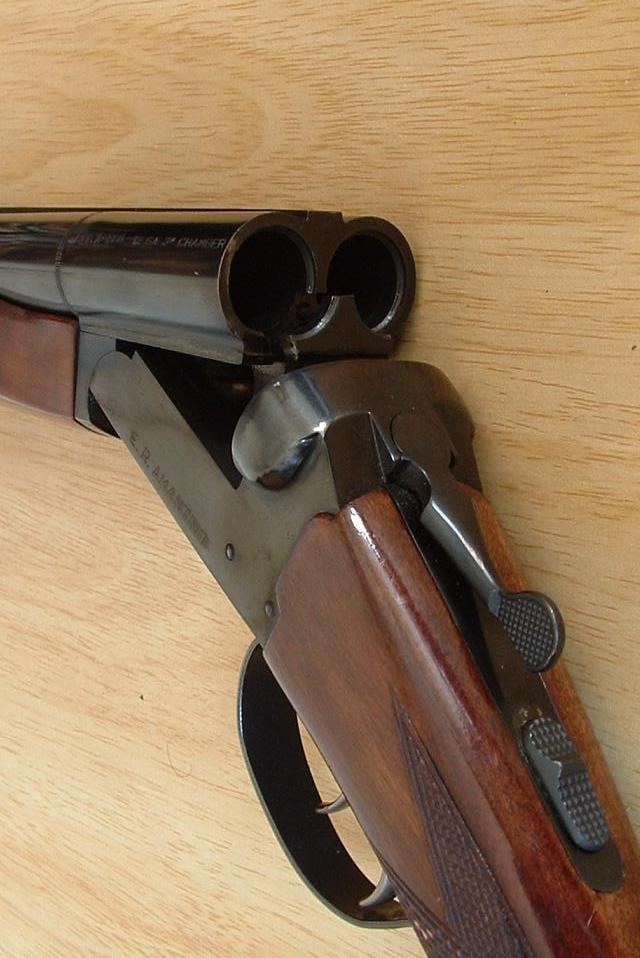
A view of the break-action of a side-by-side double-barreled shotgun.

A shotgun with two barrels that are usually of the same gauge or bore. The two types of double-barreled shotguns are over/under (O/U), in which the two barrels are stacked on top of each other, and side-by-side (SxS), in which the two barrels sit parallel to each other. Combination guns are double-barreled guns that use one shotgun barrel and one rifle barrel.
double action revolver
A revolver whose trigger performs two actions, firing the round, and cocking the hammer.
double rifle

A rifle that has two barrels, usually of the same caliber. Like shotguns, they are configured either in over-and-under or side-by-side.
drilling

A firearm with three barrels (from the German: drei, lit. 'three'). Typically it has two shotgun barrels in a side-by-side configuration on the top, with a single rifle barrel underneath.
drum magazine

A type of firearms magazine that is cylindrical in shape, similar to a drum.
dry fire

The practice of "firing" a firearm without ammunition. That is, to pull the trigger and allow the hammer or striker to drop on an empty chamber.
dum-dum

A bullet designed to expand on impact, increasing in diameter to limit penetration and/or produce a larger diameter wound. The two typical designs are the hollow-point bullet and the soft-point bullet.
dummy

A round of ammunition that is completely inert, i.e., contains no primer, propellant, or explosive charge. It is used to check weapon function, and for crew training. Unlike a blank, it contains no charge at all.
dust cover
A seal for the ejection port (which allows spent brass to exit the upper receiver after firing) from allowing contaminants such as sand, dirt, or other debris from entering the mechanism.

== E ==
Ear protection

Devices used to help reduce the sound of a firearm, to prevent hearing damage. Most commonly earplugs or ear defenders.
Effective range
The maximum range at which a particular firearm can accurately hit a target.
Ejection port
The ejection port is an opening in the receiver of a firearm (in most semi-automatic pistols in the slide) through which the cartridges/shotgun shells, or in some cases an opening on the actual bolts of primer actuated firearms where the primers are expended after firing.
Electronic firing

The use of an electric current to fire a cartridge, instead of a percussion cap. In an electronic-fired firearm an electric current is used instead to ignite the propellant, which fires the cartridge as soon as the trigger is pulled.
Eye relief

For optics such as binoculars or a rifle scope, eye relief is the distance from the eyepiece to the viewer's eye that matches the eyepiece exit pupil to the eye's entrance pupil. Short eye relief requires the observer to press their eye close to the eyepiece in order to see an un-vignetted image. For a shooter, eye relief is an important safety consideration. An optic with too short an eye relief can cut skin at the contact point between the optic and the shooter's eyebrow due to recoil.
Expanding bullet

An expanding bullet is a bullet designed to expand on impact, increasing in diameter to limit penetration and/or produce a larger diameter wound. The two typical designs are the hollow-point bullet and the soft-point bullet.
Extractor

A part in a firearm that serves to remove brass cases of fired ammunition after the ammunition has been fired. When the gun's action cycles, the extractor lifts or removes the spent brass casing from the firing chamber.

== F ==
Fail-to-fire
A firearm malfunction in which a firearm is incapable of discharging a round.
Falling block action
sliding-block action

A single-shot firearm action in which a solid metal breechblock slides vertically in grooves cut into the breech of the rifle and actuated by a lever. In the top position, it locks and resists recoil while sealing the chamber. In the lower position, it leaves the chamber open so the shooter can load a cartridge from the rear.
Ferritic nitrocarburizing

A case hardening processes that diffuse nitrogen and carbon into ferrous metals at sub-critical temperatures to improve scuffing resistance, fatigue properties and corrosion resistance of metal surfaces. Also called nitriding.
Feed ramp

A detail which leads the cartridge from the magazine into the chamber.
Field strip

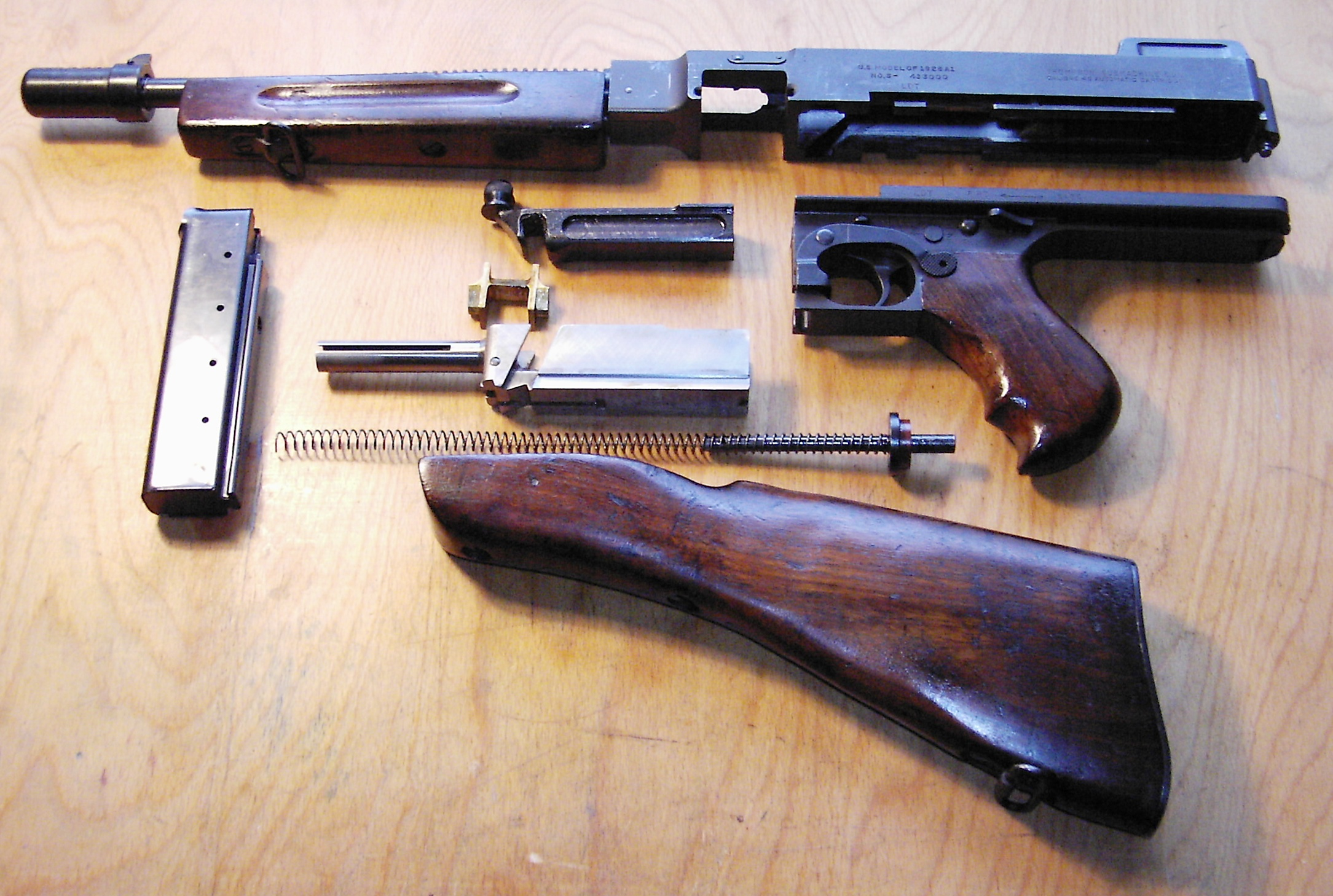
A field stripped Thompson submachine gun

Disassembling a firearm for the purpose of repair or cleaning, without tools. When using tools, this is called a detail strip.
Firearm

A weapon that fires bullets, and of such a size that is designed for usage by one individual.
Fire forming

The process of reshaping a metallic cartridge case to fit a new chamber by firing it within that chamber.
Firing pin

The part of a firearm that strikes the primer, discharging the round.
Flash suppressor
flash hider

A device that is attached to the muzzle of a firearm, that lowers the temperature at which gases disperse upon firing.
Flintlock

An obsolete mechanism for discharging a firearm.
Fluted barrel
Removal of material from a cylindrical surface, usually creating grooves. This is most often the barrel of a rifle, though it may also refer to the cylinder of a revolver or the bolt of a bolt action rifle. In contrast to rifle barrels and revolver cylinders, rifle bolts are normally helically fluted, though helical fluting is sometimes also applied to rifle barrels.
Fluted chamber
A barrel chamber that allows gas to leak around the cartridge during extraction. Fluted chambers are often found in Delayed Blowback firearms.
Fouling shot
A fouling shot is a shot fired through a clean bore, intended to leave some residue of firing and prepare the bore for more consistent performance in subsequent shots. The first shot through a clean bore behaves differently from subsequent shots through a bore with traces of powder residue, resulting in a different point of impact. Also, the Fouling Shot Journal, a publication of the Cast Bullet Association
Forcing cone
The tapered section at the rear of the barrel of a revolver that eases the entry of the bullet into the bore, similar to that of a feed ramp.
Forward assist

A button, found on firearms firing from closed bolt only and with non-reciprocating cocking handles, commonly on AR-10/AR-15-styled rifles, usually located near the bolt closure, that when hit, pushes the bolt carrier forward, ensuring that the bolt is locked in-battery position.
Fouling

The accumulation of unwanted material on solid surfaces. The fouling material can consist of either powder, lubrication residue, or bullet material such as lead or copper.
Frangible

A bullet that is designed to disintegrate into tiny particles upon impact to minimize their penetration for reasons of range safety, to limit environmental impact, or to limit the danger behind the intended target. Examples are the Glaser Safety Slug and the breaching round.
Free gun

A term for a General Purpose Machine Gun used by Door gunners that is not installed on a weapon mount but a bungee/sling allowing more free movement.
Frizzen

An L-shaped piece of steel hinged at the rear used in flintlock firearms. The flint scraping the steel throws a shower of sparks into the flash pan.

== G ==
Gas bleed
A device used on a firearm for various purposes. One example found on bolt action rifles to prevent ruptured cartridges. The other used on gas operated firearms, usually a small hole on the barrel/gas block that is used to push back a gas piston to unlock the bolt.
Gas check

A device used in some types of firearms ammunition when non-jacketed bullets are used in high pressure cartridges, to prevent the buildup of lead in the barrel and aid in accuracy.
Gas-operated reloading

A system of operation used to provide energy to operate autoloading firearms.
Gatling gun

A hand-crank operated cannon named after its inventor, Richard Gatling. In modern usage, a Gatling often refers to a rotary machine gun.
Gauge

The gauge of a firearm is a unit of measurement used to express the diameter of the barrel.
General purpose machine gun

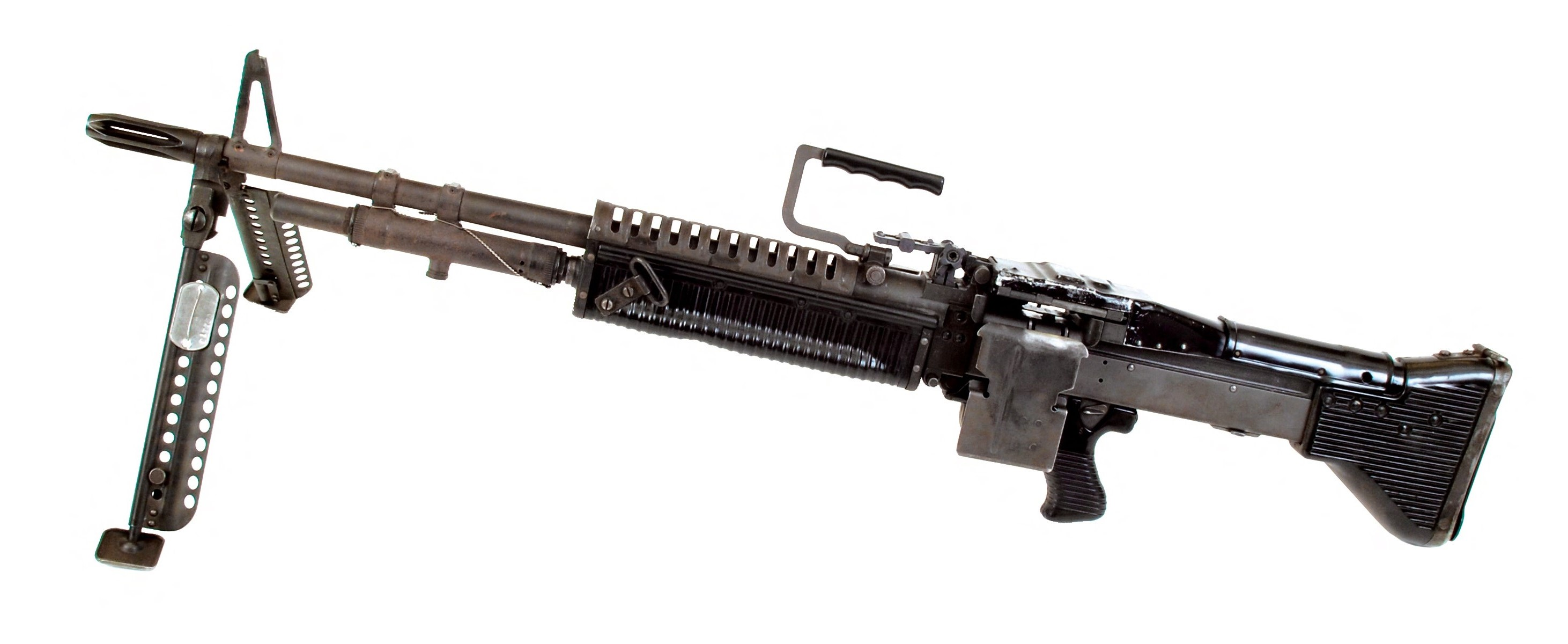
The M60, a general purpose machine gun

A machine gun intended to fill the role of either a light machine gun or medium machine gun, while at the same time being man-portable.
Grain

A unit of measurement of mass that is based upon the mass of a single seed of a typical cereal. Used in firearms to denote the amount of powder in a cartridge or the weight of a bullet. Traditionally it was based on the weight of a grain of wheat or barley, but since 1958, the grain (gr) measure has been redefined using the International System of Units as precisely 64.79891 mg. There are 7,000 grains per avoirdupois pound in the Imperial and U.S. customary units.
Grenading
An unintended breech explosion causing damage/injury.
Grip safety

A safety mechanism, usually a lever on the rear of a pistol grip, that automatically unlocks the trigger mechanism of a firearm as pressure is applied by the shooter's hand.
gunpowder
1.

A mixture of sulfur, charcoal, and potassium nitrate. It burns rapidly, producing a volume of hot gas made up of carbon dioxide, water, and nitrogen, and a solid residue of potassium sulfide. Because of its burning properties and the amount of heat and gas volume that it generates, gunpowder has been widely used as a propellant in firearms and as a pyrotechnic composition in fireworks.
2. Also refers broadly to any propellant powder. Modern firearms (since 1886) do not use the traditional gunpowder (black powder) described above, but instead use smokeless powder. Guncotton replaced black powder as a propellant, and was in turn replaced by smokeless powder.
Gun serial number

A unique identifier given to a specific firearm.

== H ==
Hammer bite
The action of an external hammer pinching or poking the web of the operator's shooting hand between the thumb and fore-finger when the gun is fired. Some handguns prone to this are the M1911 pistol and the Browning Hi-Power.
Hammer retarder / Rate reducer

A device used to slow the rate of fire in order to increase handling/accuracy, ammo consumption, overheating etc.
Hang fire

An unexpected delay between the triggering of a firearm and the ignition of the propellant. This failure was common in firearm actions that relied on open primer pans, due to the poor or inconsistent quality of the powder. Modern weapons are susceptible, particularly if the ammunition has been stored in an environment outside of the design specifications.
Half-cock

The position of the hammer where the hammer is partially but not completely cocked. Many firearms, particularly older firearms, had a notch cut into the hammer allowing half-cock, as this position would neither allow the gun to fire nor permit the hammer-mounted firing pin to rest on a live percussion cap or cartridge. The purpose of the half-cock position has variously been used both for loading a firearm, and as a safety-mechanism.
Hammer

The function of the hammer is to strike the firing pin in a firearm, which in turn detonates the impact-sensitive cartridge primer. The hammer of a firearm was given its name for both resemblance and functional similarity to the common tool.
Hammer/striker cocker
A device used on various pistols with single-action triggers used to cock the hammer/striker as an alternative to pistols with double-action triggers.
Handgun

A type of firearm that is compact enough that it can be held and used with only a single hand.
Hatcher hole

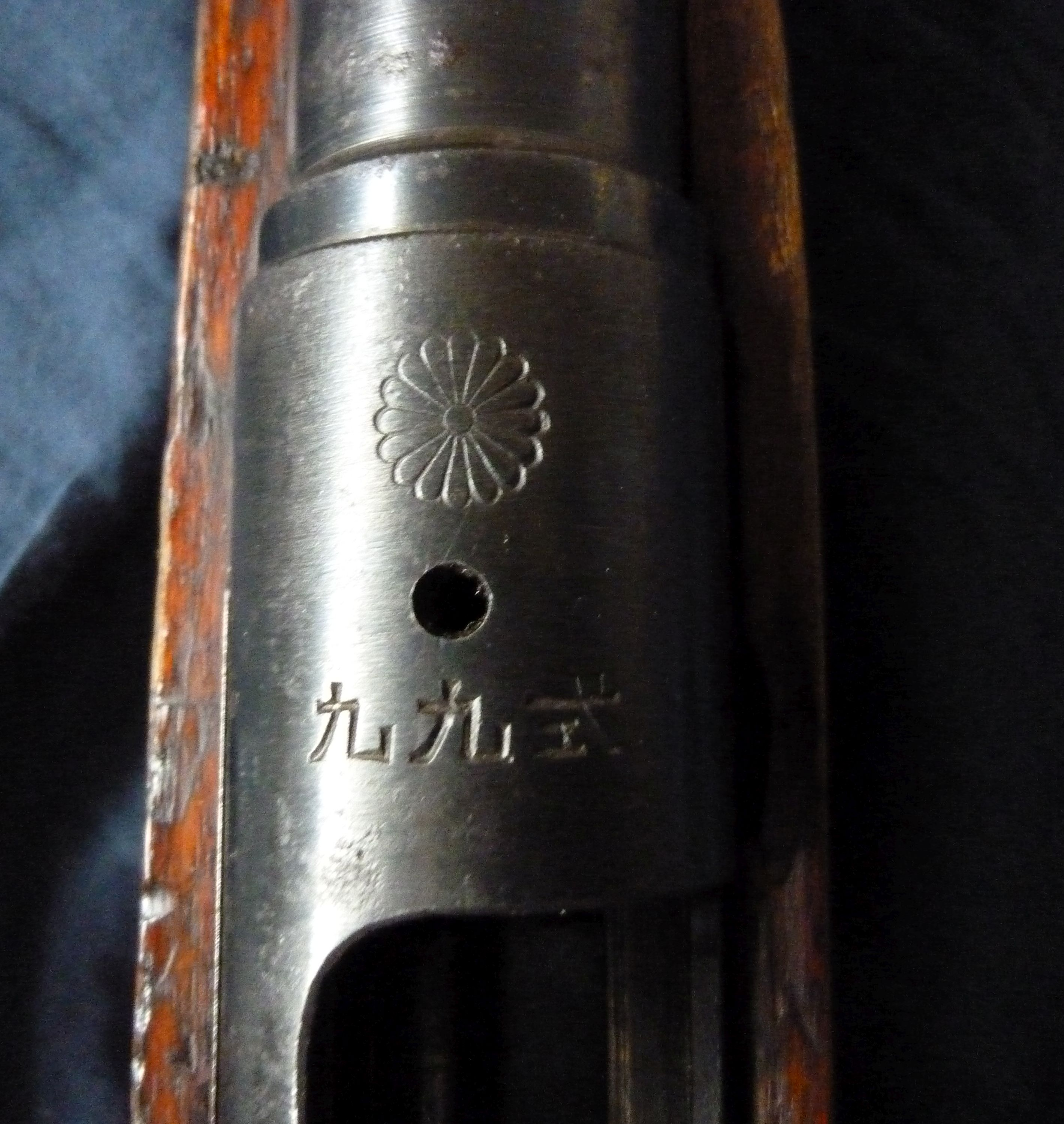
Hatcher hole

A device used on a bolt action rifle to prevent ruptured cartridges/pierced primers and to ensure particles of brass do not escape to the rear through the bolt mechanism but escape through the gas escape hole. This prevents the pressure from building up and potentially causing the receiver to rupture, venting it to the side/top of the rifle instead of building up pressure and causing a dangerous blowout. Hatcher holes are typically located in the bolt and/or receiver.
headspace
headspacing

The distance measured from the part of the chamber that stops forward motion of the cartridge (the datum reference) to the face of the bolt. Used as a verb, headspace refers to the interference created between this part of the chamber and the feature of the cartridge that achieves the correct positioning.
Headstamp

A headstamp is the markings on the bottom of a cartridge case designed for a firearm. It usually tells who manufactured the case. If it is a civilian case it often also tells the caliber, if it is military, the year of manufacture is often added.
Heavy machine gun

A machine gun firing large diameter rifle cartridges, considerably larger than a medium or light machine gun. Most heavy machine guns fire larger rounds, such as the .50 BMG or 12.7×108mm.
High brass
A shotgun shell for more powerful loads with the brass extended up further along the sides of the shell, while light loads use "low brass" shells. The brass does not provide significantly more strength, but the difference in appearance helps shooters quickly differentiate between higher and lower powered ammunition.
Holographic weapon sight

a non-magnifying gun sight that allows the user to look through a glass optical window and see a cross hair reticle image superimposed at a distance on the field of view. The hologram of the reticle is built into the window and is illuminated by a laser diode.
Honeycomb
When the surface of the bore of a gun has cavities, or holes in it, caused by corrosion or casting defects.

== I ==
Improved cartridge

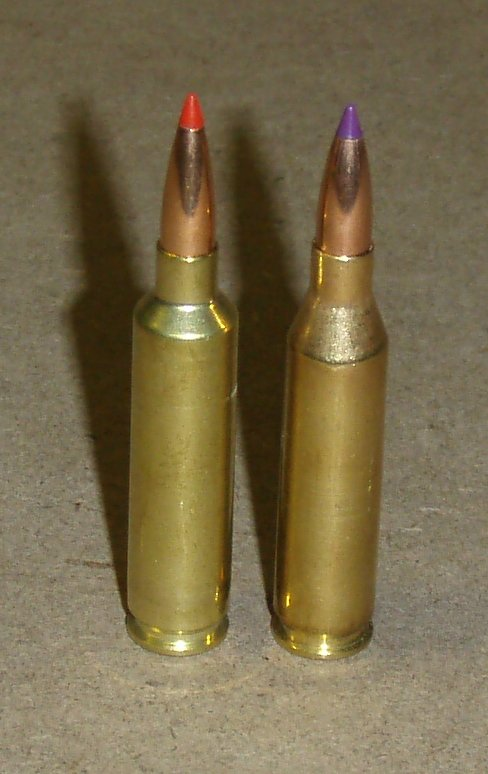
.243 Winchester Ackley Improved (left) and .243 Winchester (right)

A wildcat cartridge that is created by straightening out the sides of an existing case and making a sharper shoulder to maximize powder space. Frequently the neck length and shoulder position are altered as well. The caliber is NOT changed in the process.
IMR powder
Improved Military Rifle

A series of tubular nitrocellulose smokeless powders evolved from World War I through World War II for loading military and commercial ammunition and sold to private citizens for reloading rifle ammunition for hunting and target shooting.
Improvised firearm

A firearm manufactured by someone who is not a regular maker of firearms, often as part of an insurgency.
Internal ballistics

A subfield of ballistics, that is the study of a projectile's behavior from the time its propellant's igniter is initiated until it exits the gun barrel. The study of internal ballistics is important to designers and users of firearms of all types, from small-bore Olympic rifles and pistols, to high-tech artillery.
Iron sights

A system of aligned markers used to assist in the aiming of a device such as a firearm, crossbow, or telescope, and exclude the use of optics as in a scope. Iron sights are typically composed of two component sights, formed by metal blades: a rear sight mounted perpendicular to the line of sight and consisting of some form of notch (open sight) or aperture (closed sight); and a front sight that is a post, bead, or ring.

== J ==
Jacket

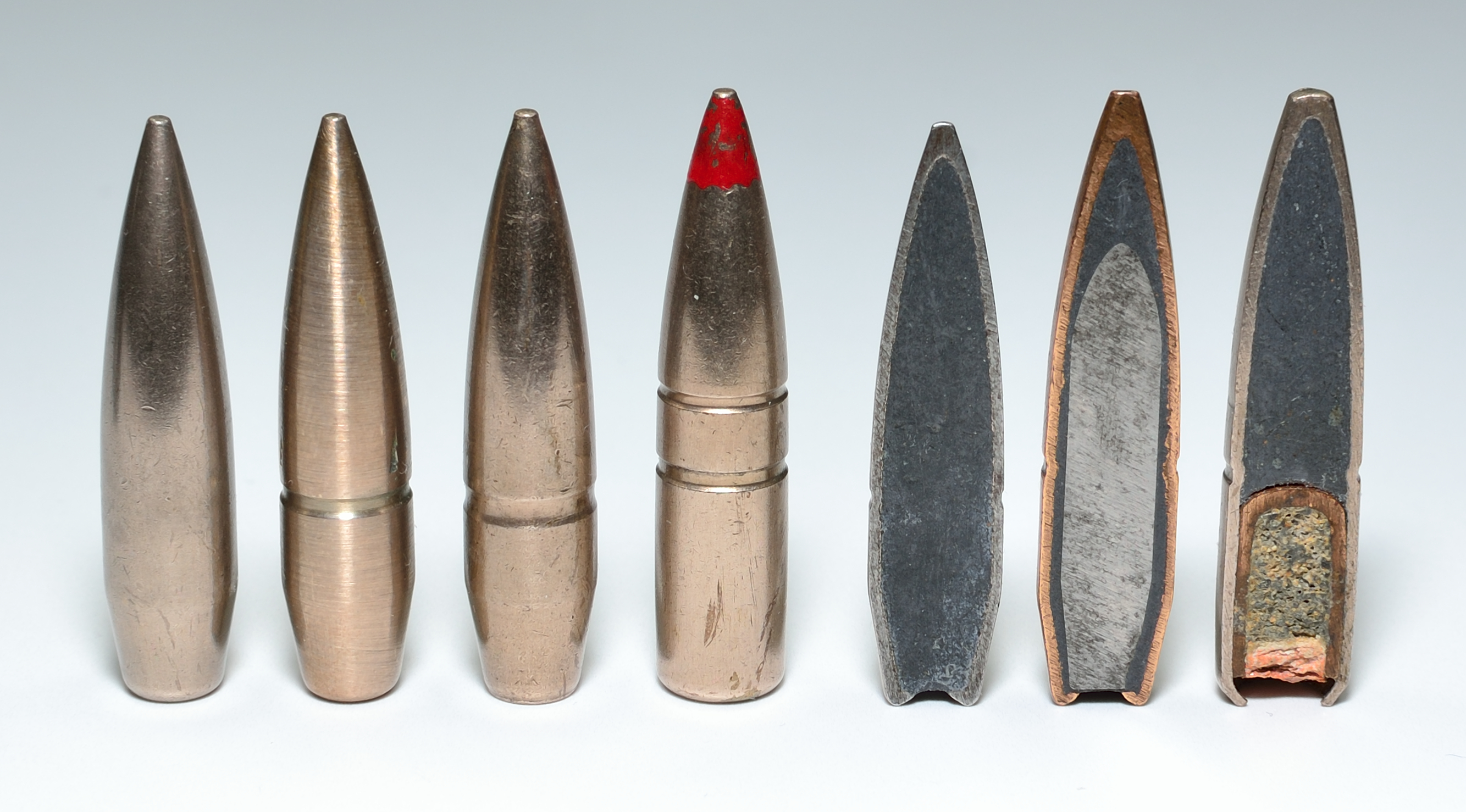
Jacketed bullets

A metal, usually copper, wrapped around a lead core to form a bullet.
Jam
A type of firearm malfunction, in which a cartridge does not load correctly and needs to be resolved by the user to maintain proper functioning.
Jeweling
A cosmetic process to enhance the looks of firearm parts, such as the bolt. The look is created with an abrasive brush and compound that roughs the surface of the metal in a circular pattern. Asides aesthetics, it can be used as an anti-glare on the barrel and hold lubricants on components.

== K ==
Keyhole
keyholing
Refers to the end-over-end tumbling of the bullet which will often leave an elongated or keyhole shaped hole in a paper target. This occurs when the bullet is insufficiently stabilised by the firearm's rifling, either because the rifling is too slow or long for a given bullet, also meaning that the bullet is too long or tail heavy for said rifling. Or else due to poor fit of an undersize bullet in the gun barrel. In these cases the bullet has a natural tendency to wobble, and may start to tumble end-over-end just encountering the resistance of the air. Keyholing can also occur in wounding (human or animal), when the bullet is sufficiently stabilised for penetrating the air only, but not for penetrating denser media such as bone or flesh. In these cases tumbling starts at some point inside the victim's body, subsequently causing massive wounding. When using a bullet/rifling combination which is just sufficiently stabilised for normal flight though free air, and so to easily produce massive keyhole wounds in the victim, then keyholing may occur quite easily in flight if any obstacle is encountered, be it a twig, leaf, even a blade of grass or a large rain-drop.
Khyber Pass copy

A firearm manufactured by cottage gunsmiths in the Khyber Pass region between Pakistan and Afghanistan.
kick
kickback

== L ==
Laser sight

an attachment that projects a laser beam onto the target, providing a rough point of impact.
Leading
The act of aiming a firearm in front of a moving target, to compensate for the bullet's travel time.
Length of pull

The distance between the trigger and the butt end of the shoulder stock of a rifle or shotgun.
Lever-action

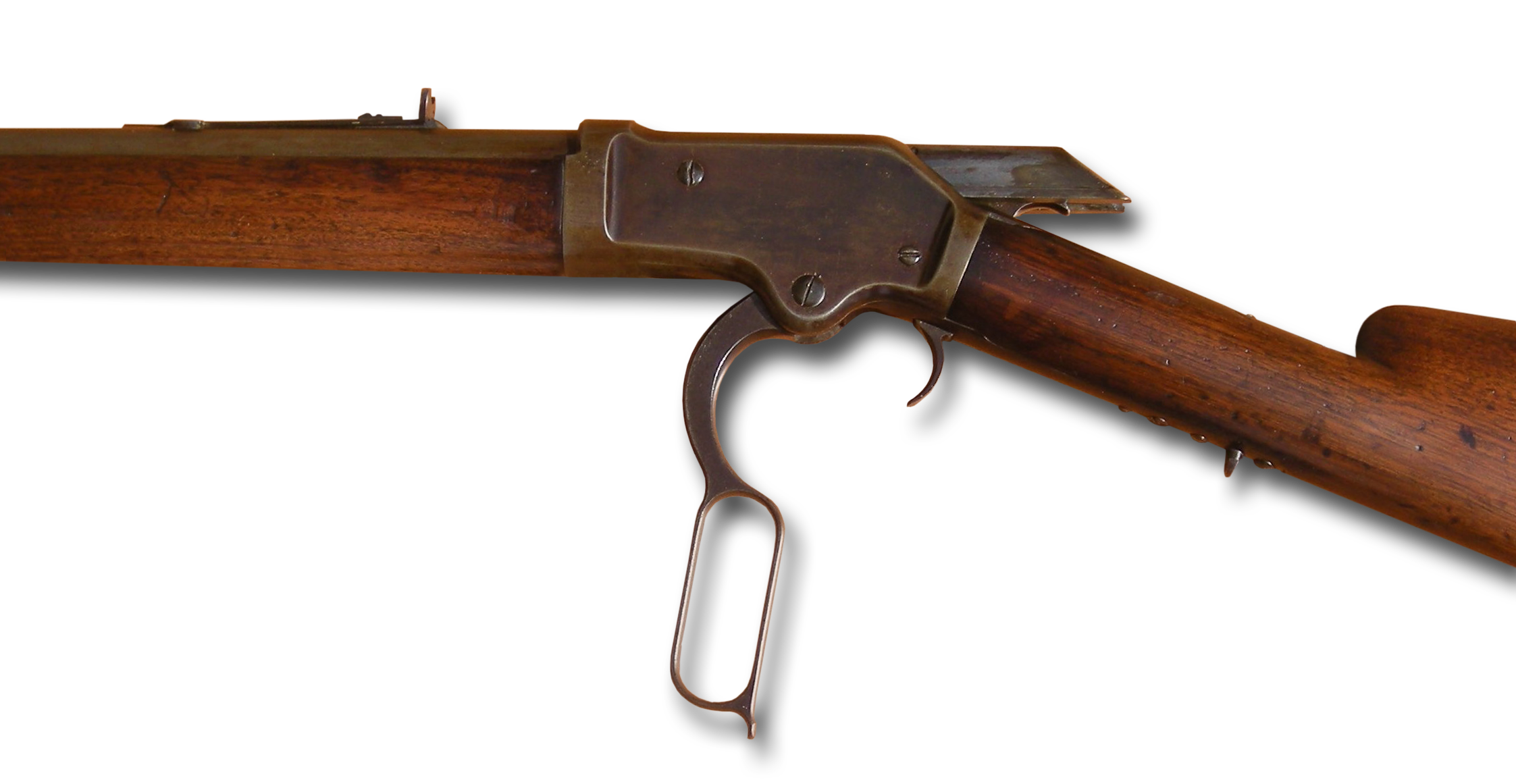
Lever-action rifle

A type of firearm action with a lever that encircles the trigger guard area, (often including the trigger guard itself) to load fresh cartridges into the chamber of the barrel when the lever is worked.
Light machine gun

a class of machine gun often defined as being designed for carry and use by a single operator and firing the same intermediate-power cartridge as other soldiers in a unit.
Linkless feed system
a magazine device that works similar to a conveyor belt but without using links.
Live fire exercise
LFX

Any exercise that simulates a realistic scenario for the use of specific equipment. In the popular lexicon this applies primarily to tests of weapons or weapon systems associated with a branch of a nation's armed forces, though the term can also apply to civilian activity.
Lock

the mechanism of a firearm that is used to initiate the ignition and propel the projectile down the barrel.
Lug
any piece that projects from a firearm for the purpose of attaching something to it. For example, barrel lugs are used to attach a break-action shotgun barrel to the action itself. If the firearm is a revolver, the term may also refer to a protrusion under the barrel that adds weight, thereby stabilizing the gun during aiming, mitigating recoil, and reducing muzzle flip. A full lug extends all the way to the muzzle, while a half lug extends only partially down the barrel. On a swing-out-cylinder revolver, the lug is slotted to accommodate the ejector rod.

== M ==
Machine gun

A fully automatic weapon capable of sustained fire over a long period of time.
Machine pistol

A pistol capable of automatic fire. Also used interchangeably with submachine gun.
Magazine

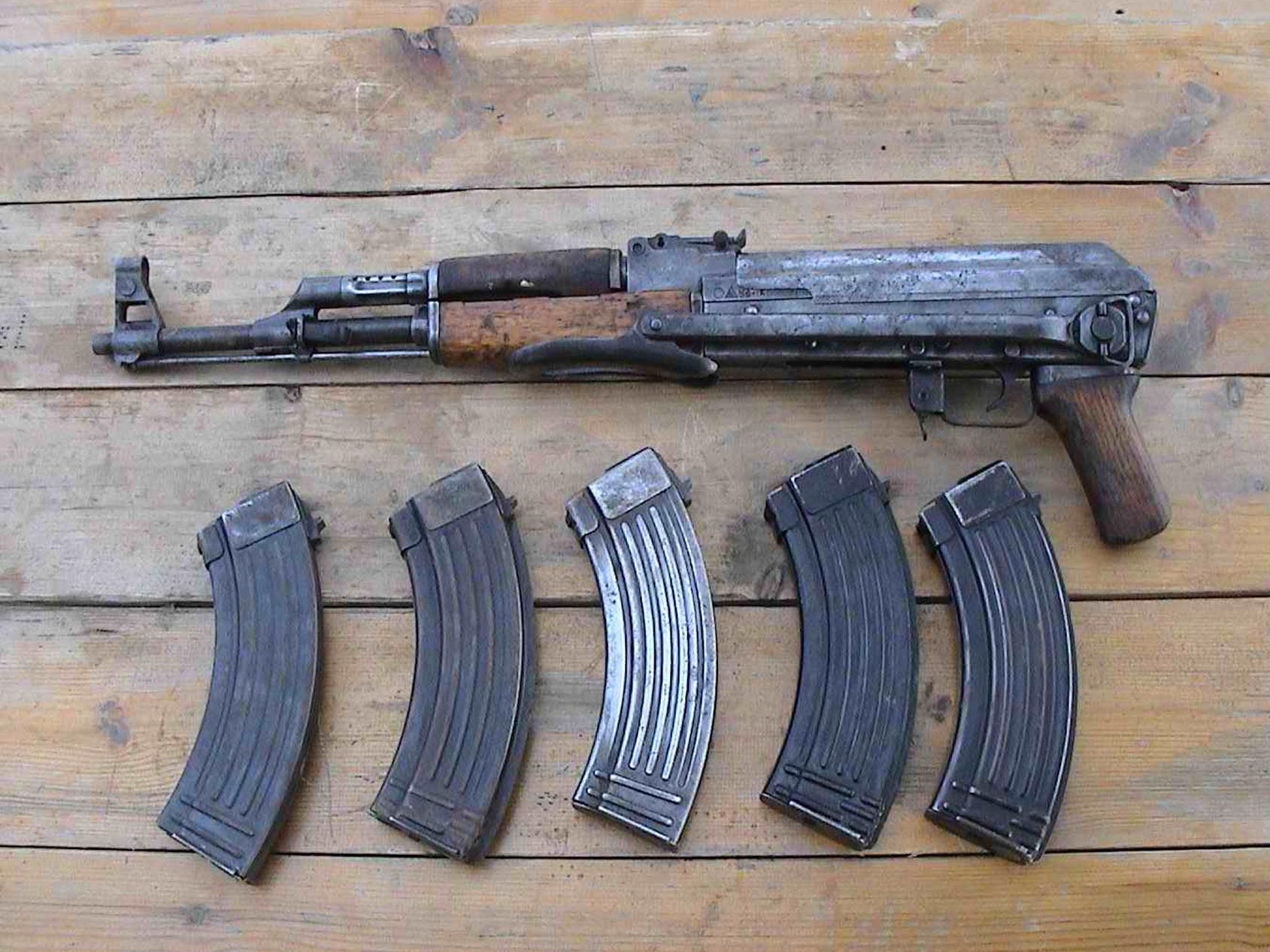
Type 56-1 assault rifle with magazines

A magazine is an ammunition storage and feeding device within or attached to a repeating firearm. Magazines may be integral to the firearm (fixed) or removable (detachable). The magazine functions by moving the cartridges stored in the magazine into a position where they may be loaded into the chamber by the action of the firearm.
Match grade

Firearm parts and ammunition that are suitable for a competitive match. This refers to parts that are designed and manufactured such that they have a relatively tight-tolerances and high level of accuracy.
Matchlock

An obsolete mechanism for discharging a firearm.
Medium machine gun

A class of machine gun often defined as being designed for carry and use by multiple operators, firing a full-power rifle cartridge.
Mine shell

A high explosive round used for armour piercing etc.
Muzzle

The part of a firearm at the end of the barrel from which the projectile exits.
Muzzle brakes and recoil compensators

Devices that are fitted to the muzzle of a firearm to redirect propellant gases with the effect of countering both recoil of the gun and unwanted rising of the barrel during rapid fire.
Muzzle energy

the kinetic energy of a bullet as it is expelled from the muzzle of a firearm. It is often used as a rough indication of the destructive potential of a given firearm or load. The heavier the bullet and the faster it moves, the higher its muzzle energy and the more damage it does.
Muzzle velocity

The speed at which a projectile leaves the muzzle of the gun. Muzzle velocities range from approximately 800 ft/s (240 m/s) for some pistols and older cartridges to more than 4,000 ft/s (1,200 m/s) in modern cartridges such as the .220 Swift and .204 Ruger. In conventional guns, muzzle velocity is determined by the quality (burn speed, expansion) and quantity of the propellant, the mass of the projectile, and the length of the barrel.

== N ==
Necking down
necking up
Shrinking or expanding the neck of an existing cartridge to make it use a bullet of a different caliber. A typical process used in the creation of wildcat cartridges.
National Rifle Association (NRA)
1.

American organization that lists its goals as the protection of the Second Amendment of the United States Bill of Rights and the promotion of firearm ownership rights as well as marksmanship, firearm safety, and the protection of hunting and self-defense in the United States. The NRA is also the sanctioning body for most marksmanship competition in the United States, from the local to international level (particularly bullseye style events).
2.

A National Rifle Association of a non-US country or state.

== O ==
occluded eye gunsight (OEG)

Out-of-battery

The status of a weapon before the action has returned to the normal firing position. The term originates from artillery, referring to a gun that fires before it has been pulled back into its firing position in a gun battery. In firearms where there is an automatic loading mechanism, a condition in which a live round is at least partially in the firing chamber and capable of being fired, but is not properly secured by the usual mechanism of that particular weapon can occur.
Over and Under
O/U
A configuration for double-barreled shotguns, in which the barrels are arranged vertically.
Over-bore
Small caliber bullets being used in very large cases. It is the relationship between the volume of powder that can fit in a case and the diameter of the inside of the barrel or bore.
Obturate

An ordnance word; to close (a hole or cavity) so as to prevent a flow of gas through it, especially the escape of explosive gas from a gun tube during firing. The process of obturation is where a recess in the base of a bullet allows for expanding gases to press against the base and inside skirt of the bullet creating a gas tight seal to the bore. See also swage.
Offset mount

A situation wherein it may not be practical to mount a telescopic sight directly above the receiver and barrel of a firearm. This was noted with many military and service arms where new ammunition was fed from above along a similar path, in reverse, to the spent cartridge cases being ejected clear. Not often seen or used today, although complete or partial sets of offset mounts attract keen interest from restorers and collectors.
Open bolt

Open-bolt weapons have the bolt to the rear of the receiver when ready to fire. This means that when the trigger is pulled the bolt moves forward, feeds a cartridge into the chamber and fires that cartridge in one movement.
Open sight
A type of iron sight that has an open notch.
Open Tip Match

A type of bullet. The open tip design employs a precision deep drawn jacket with lead inserted from the front tip and ogival forming from the open tip mouth, and originated strictly for competitive match.

== P ==
Paramilitary ammunition
Firearm ammunition not used by the armed forces but retains combat capabilities and sold commercially to civilians or used by various law enforcement/government organisations.
Paramilitary firearm
Firearms not used by the armed forces but retains military capabilities (IE: Design layout, ergonomics, field strip ability, modularity etc). The term may refer to semi automatic only variants of military firearms sold to civilians/law enforcement agencies/government paramilitary organisations or privately-owned military firearms (semi- or full-auto) chambered in civilian rounds.
Parkerizing

A method of protecting a steel surface from corrosion and increasing its resistance to wear through the application of an electrochemical phosphate conversion coating. Also called phosphating and phosphatizing.
Parts kit

A kit of firearm parts minus the receiver. Used to build a complete firearm with the purchase or manufacture of a receiver (regulated in the US).
PCC

Short for Pistol Caliber Carbine. A class of firearms that typically refers to rifle-length firearms that are chambered for common pistol cartridges.
Peak pressure reservoir
An array of annular chambers within the barrel that conserves pressure without increased barrel length.
Percussion cap

a small cylinder of copper or brass that was the crucial invention that enabled muzzle-loading firearms to fire reliably in any weather. The cap has one closed end. Inside the closed end is a small amount of a shock-sensitive explosive material such as fulminate of mercury. The percussion cap is placed over a hollow metal "nipple" at the rear end of the gun barrel. Pulling the trigger releases a hammer, which strikes the percussion cap and ignites the explosive primer. The flame travels through the hollow nipple to ignite the main powder charge.
Picatinny rail

A bracket used on some firearms to provide a standardized mounting platform.
Pinfire

An obsolete type of brass cartridge in which the priming compound is ignited by striking a small pin that protrudes radially from just above the base of the cartridge.
Plinking

Informal target shooting done at non-traditional targets such as tin cans, glass bottles, and balloons filled with water.
POA
point of aim.
Pocket mortar
A flare pistol modified as an ad-hoc grenade launcher or capable of firing high explosive armor piercing rounds, in particular as an anti-tank weapon.
Point of impact
The exact place at which a bullet hits its target.
Ported chamber
A barrel chamber with pressure relief ports that allows gas to leak around the cartridge during extraction. Basically the opposite of a fluted chamber as it is intended for the cartridge to stick to the chamber wall making a slight delay of extraction. This requires a welded-on sleeve with an annular groove to contain the pressure.
Pistol

A type of firearm that can be held and fired with one hand. The word pistol is usually used to refer specifically to a semi-automatic pistol.
Pistol grip

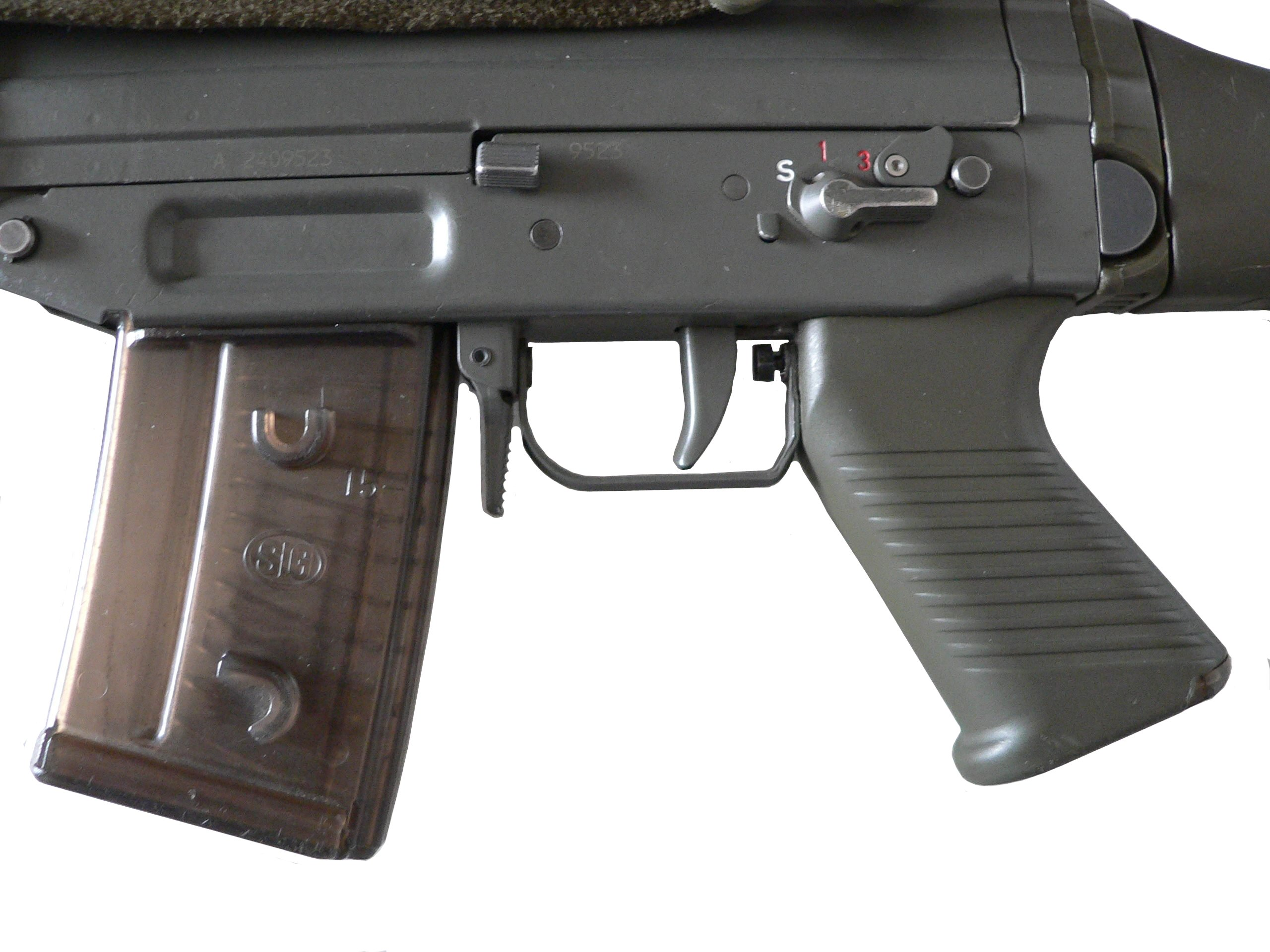
Pistol grip on a SIG SG 550

A feature on some firearms that gives the user a slightly curved area to grip, just rear of the trigger.
Powerhead
bang stick

A specialized firearm used underwater that is fired when in direct contact with the target.
Propellant
The substance in a cartridge that burns to create pressure that propels the projectile. Examples are cordite and gunpowder.
Pump-action

A rifle or shotgun in which the handgrip can be pumped back and forth to eject a spent round of ammunition and to chamber a fresh one. It is much faster than a bolt-action and somewhat faster than a lever-action, as it does not require that the shooter remove their trigger hand during reloading. In rifles, this action is also commonly called a slide action.

== R ==
Ramrod

A device used with early firearms to push the projectile up against the propellant (mainly gunpowder).
Rate of fire

The frequency at which a firearm can fire its projectiles. Usually measured in RPM (rounds per minute).
Receiver

the part of a firearm that houses the operating parts.
recoil

The backward momentum of a firearm when it is discharged. In technical terms, the recoil caused by the gun exactly balances the forward momentum of the projectile, according to Newton's third law.
Recoil operation

An operating mechanism used in locked-breech, autoloading firearms. As the name implies, these actions use the force of recoil to provide energy to cycle the action.
Red dot magnifier

An optical telescope that can be paired with a non-magnifying optical sight turning the combination into a telescopic sight.
Red dot sight

A type of reflector (reflex) sight for firearms that gives the uses a red light-emitting diode as a reticle to create an aim point.
Reflector (reflex) sight

A generally non-magnifying optical device that has an optically collimated reticle, allowing the user to look through a partially reflecting glass element and see a parallax free cross hair or other projected aiming point superimposed on the field of view. Invented in 1900 but not generally used on firearms until reliably illuminated versions were invented in the late 1970s (usually referred to by the abbreviation "reflex sight").
Reversed bullet

A bullet placed in the cartridge backwards as an ad-hoc way of armour piercing.
Revolver

A repeating firearm that has a cylinder containing multiple chambers and at least one barrel for firing.
Rib
A grooved/textured surface found above the receiver/barrel to improve target acquisition.
Ricochet

A rebound, bounce or skip off a surface, particularly in the case of a projectile.
Rifle bedding

A process of filling gaps between the action and the stock of a rifle with an epoxy based material.
Rifling

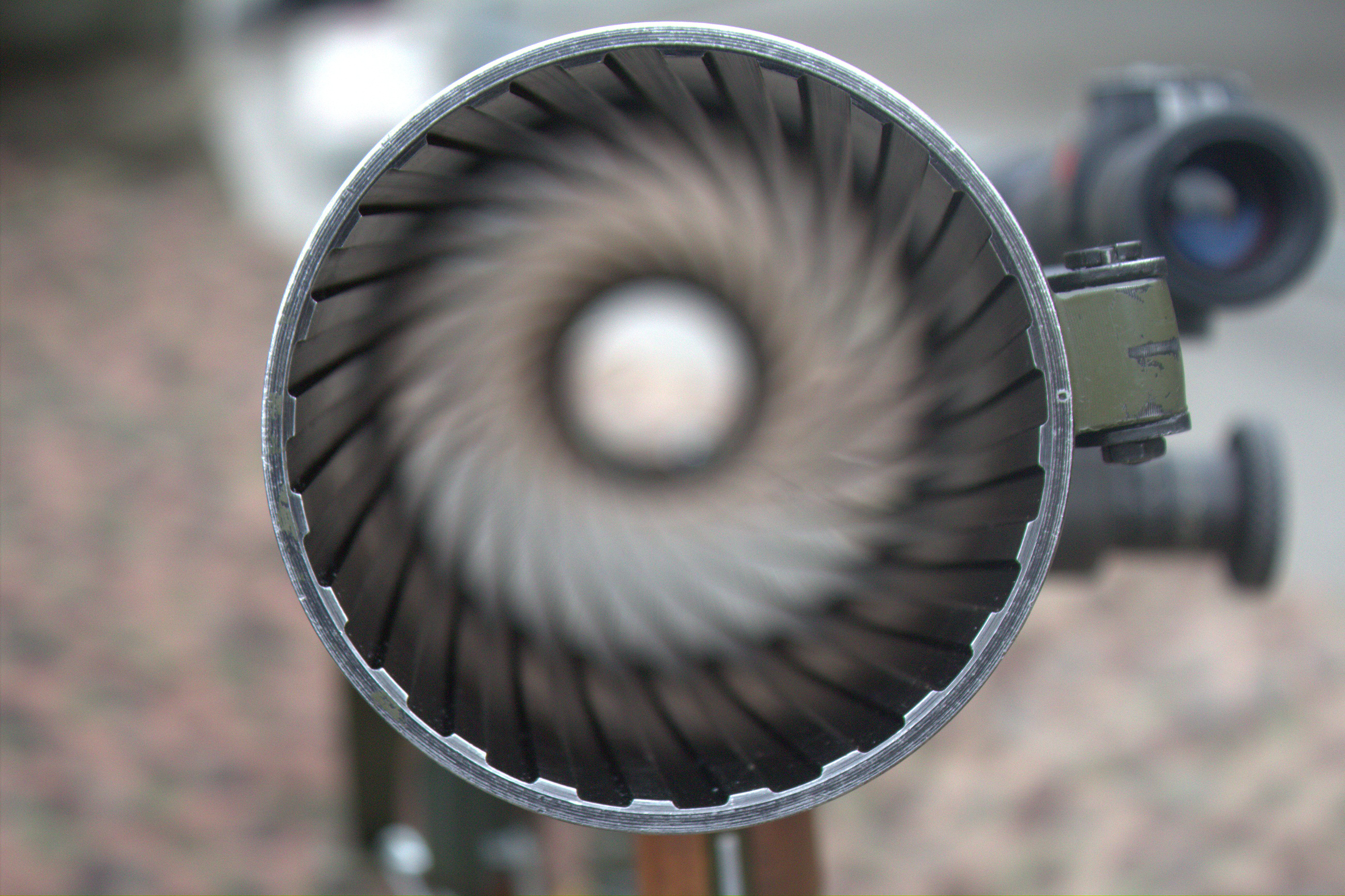
Rifled barrel on a Carl Gustaf 8.4cm recoilless rifle

Helical grooves in the barrel of a firearm, which imparts a spin to a projectile around its long axis. This spin serves to gyroscopically stabilize the projectile, improving its aerodynamic stability and accuracy.
Rimfire

A type of firearm cartridge that used a firing pin to strike the base's rim, instead of striking the primer cap at the center of the base of the cartridge to ignite it (as in a centerfire cartridge). The rim of the rimfire cartridge is essentially an extended and widened percussion cap that contains the priming compound, while the cartridge case itself contains the propellant powder and the projectile (bullet).
Riot gun

A gun that has been loaded for rubber bullets, smoke grenades, or any other projectile that is not designed to kill its target.
Rolling block

A form of firearm action where the sealing of the breech is done with a circular shaped breechblock able to rotate on a pin. The breechblock is locked into place by the hammer, thus preventing the cartridge from moving backwards at the moment of firing. By cocking the hammer, the breechblock can be rotated freely to reload the weapon.
Rotary cannon

A type of autocannon that contains multiple rotating barrels. If in a machine gun caliber it is referred to as a rotary machine gun.
Round

A single cartridge.
RPM
Rounds per minute.

== S ==
Sabot

A device used in a firearm to fire a projectile, such as a bullet, that is smaller than the bore diameter.
Safety

A mechanism used to help prevent the accidental discharge of a firearm in case of unsafe handling. Safeties can generally be divided into sub-types such as internal safeties (which typically do not receive input from the user) and external safeties (which typically allow the user to give input, for example, toggling a lever from "on" to "off" or something similar). Sometimes these are called "passive" and "active" safeties (or "automatic" and "manual"), respectively.
Sand cuts

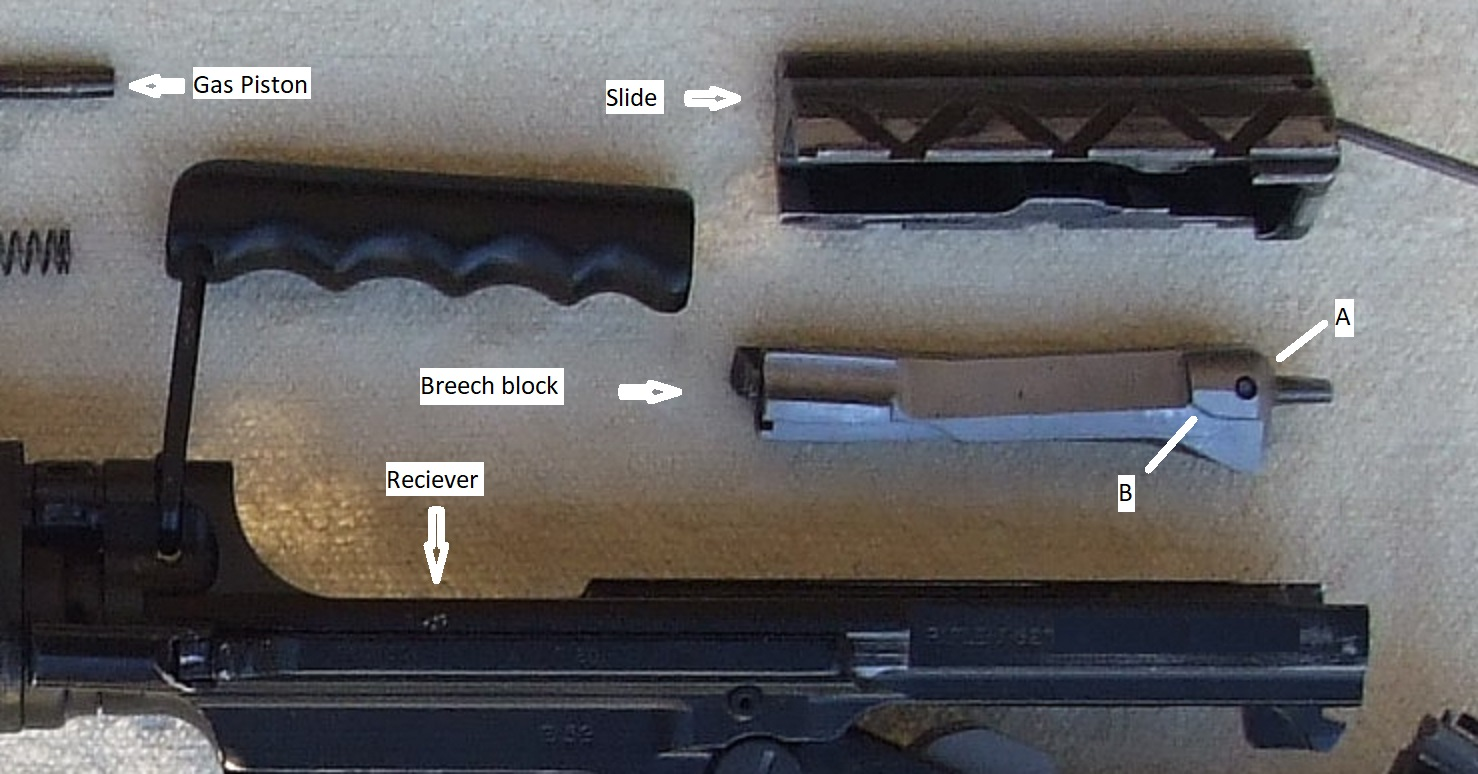
Sand cuts on a bolt carrier slide

Surface details and contours on firearm components that operate as a self-cleaning device, or to channel away residue from the main moving parts for a reliable operation.
Sawed-off shotgun
Sawn off shotgun
Short-barreled shotgun
SBS

A type of shotgun with a shorter gun barrel and often a shorter or deleted stock.
Sealed round

A sealed round is a munition which is typically stored in some kind of container (usually a cylinder or box, but the container may in fact be the outside of the munition), so that the munition does not require any sort of maintenance and is stored in this container until use.
Selective fire

A firearm that fires semi–automatically and at least one automatic mode by means of a selector depending on the weapon's design. Some selective fire weapons utilize burst fire mechanisms to limit the maximum or total number of shots fired automatically in this mode. The most common limits are two or three rounds per pull of the trigger.
Selector
The part of a selective fire weapon that allows the user to choose their desired mode of firing.
Semi-automatic

Firing a single round of ammunition each time the trigger is pulled.
Semi-automatic pistol

A pistol that has a single chamber, and is capable of semi-automatic fire.
Semi-wadcutter
SWC

A type of all-purpose bullet commonly used in revolvers that combines features of the wadcutter target bullet and traditional round nosed revolver bullets, and is used in both revolver and pistol cartridges for hunting, target shooting, and plinking. The basic SWC design consists of a roughly conical nose, truncated with a flat point, sitting on a cylinder. The flat nose punches a clean hole in the target, rather than tearing it like a round nose bullet would, and the sharp shoulder enlarges the hole neatly, allowing easy and accurate scoring of the target. The SWC design offers better external ballistics than the wadcutter, as its conical nose produces less drag than the flat cylinder.
Shooting butt

Mounds of earth used at shooting ranges to place the targets and weapons clearing stations to 'absorb' the bullets.
Shooting range

Specialized facility designed for firearms practice.
Shooting sticks

Portable weapon mounts.
Short-barreled rifle (SBR)

A legal designation in the United States, referring to a shoulder-fired, rifled firearm with a barrel length of less than 16" (40.6 cm) or overall length of less than 26" (66.0 cm).
Shotgun

A type of firearm designed to fire shotshell, which releases a large number of small projectiles (shot) or a single large projectile (slug) upon firing.
Side by side (SxS)
A configuration for double-barreled shotguns, in which the barrels are arranged horizontally
Sighting in
sighting
The act of setting up a telescopic or other sighting system so that the point of impact of a bullet matches the sights at a specified distance.
Silencer
suppressor
sound suppressor
sound moderator
hush puppy

A device attached to or part of the barrel of a firearm to reduce the amount of noise and flash generated by firing the weapon.
Single-action

Usually referring to a pistol or revolver, single-action is when the hammer is pulled back manually by the shooter (cocking it), after which the trigger is operated to fire the shot. See also double-action.
Single-shot

A firearm that holds only a single round of ammunition and must be reloaded after each shot.
Slamfire

A premature, unintended discharge of a firearm that occurs as a round is being loaded into the chamber.
Sleeving
A method of using new tubes to replace a worn-out gun barrel.
Slide bite
Snake bite
A phenomenon often grouped with hammer bite, in this case the web of the shooting hand is cut or abraded by the rearward motion of the semi-automatic pistol's slide, not by the gun's hammer. This most often occurs with small pistols like the Walther PPK and Walther TPH that have an abbreviated grip tang. This problem is exacerbated by the sharp machining found on many firearms.
Sling

A type of strap or harness designed to allow an operator carry a firearm (usually a long gun such as a rifle, carbine, shotgun, or submachine gun) on his/her person and/or aid in greater hit probability with that firearm.
Snap cap

An inert device shaped like a cartridge or shotshell used for function checks or training, such as dry firing.
Snubnosed revolver

A revolver with a very short barrel.
Solvent trap adaptor
A muzzle device used to attach an automobile oil filter for use as an ersatz silencer.
Sound moderator
A muzzle device used to dampen sound, although similar it differs to a Supressor.
Speedloader

A device used for loading a firearm or firearm magazine with loose ammunition very quickly. Generally, speedloaders are used for loading all chambers of a revolver simultaneously, although speedloaders of different designs are also used for the loading of fixed tubular magazines of shotguns and rifles, or the loading of box or drum magazines. Revolver speedloaders are used for revolvers having either swing-out cylinders or top-break cylinders.
Spin cocking

A quick reloading technique for lever-action firearms using a full rotation of the weapon with one hand. A similar example exists, flip cocking but this differs as the previously mentioned full rotation is not used.
Spitzer bullet

An aerodynamic bullet design.
Sporterising
sporterisation
sporterization

The practice of modifying military-type firearms either to make them suitable for civilian sporting use or to make them legal under the law.
Squib load
squib round
pop and no kick
squib

A firearms malfunction in which a fired projectile does not have enough force behind it to exit the barrel, and thus becomes stuck. Squib loads make the firearm unsafe to shoot, unless the projectile can be removed.
Stock

The part of a rifle or other firearm, to which the barrel and firing mechanism are attached, that is held against one's shoulder when firing the gun. The stock provides a means for the shooter to firmly support the device and easily aim it.
Stopping power

The ability of a firearm or other weapon to cause a penetrating ballistic injury to a target, human or animal, sufficient to incapacitate the target where it stands.
Stripper clip

A speedloader that holds several cartridges together in a single unit for easier loading of a firearm's magazine.
Submachine gun

A type of automatic, magazine-fed weapon that fires pistol cartridges.
Swage

To reduce an item in size by forcing through a die. In internal ballistics, swaging refers to the process where bullets are swaged into the rifling of the barrel by the force of the expanding powder gases.
Swaged bullet
A bullet that is formed by forcing the bullet into a die to assume its final form.
Swaged choke
A constriction or choke in a shotgun barrel formed by a swaging process that compresses the outside of the barrel.
Swaged rifling
Rifling in a firearm barrel formed by a swaging process, such as button rifling.
Synchronization gear

A device usually used on aircraft for the weapon to shoot through the propeller without damaging the rotating blades. The term can be used to describe a rate of fire moderator.

== T ==
Tack driver

A term used in the firearms industry to a firearm regardless of form one is trying to promote.
Tapering

Firearm components that narrow down to a conical fashion hence the name taper, notably with barrels and cartridges.
Taylor KO Factor

Mathematical approach for evaluating the stopping power of hunting cartridges, which favors cartridges with a high momentum and a large bullet diameter.
Telescoping stock
collapsing stock

A stock on a firearm that can telescope or fold in on itself to become more compact. Telescoping stocks are useful for storing a rifle or weapon in a space that it would not normally fit in.
Terminal ballistics

A sub-field of ballistics, the study of the behavior of a projectile when it hits its target.
Thermal dissipator
A radiator/heat sink device found on the barrel for cooling. This differs from a handguard/cooling jacket. A similar device used on tank guns exists as a thermal sleeve.
Third arm

A stabilizing device used to redistribute the weight of heavy firearms to make them easier to wield.
Throat Erosion (firearms)
The wearing of the portion of the barrel where the gas pressure and heat is highest as the projectile leaves the chamber. The greater the chamber pressure, the more rapid throat erosion occurs. This is compounded by rapid firing, which heats and weakens the steel.
Tip-up barrel

A type of firearm barrel arrangement to ease maintainability. Mostly found on handguns.
Traveling charge

A traveling charge is an additional explosive charge attached to the bottom of the projectile so that it travels with the projectile inside the gun barrel while burning.
Trigger

A mechanism that actuates the firing sequence of a firearm. Triggers almost universally consist of levers or buttons actuated by the index finger.
Trigger pull restrictor (TPR)
A quasi-selector device intended for automatic firearms using a staged trigger.
Trunnion

a cylindrical protrusion used as a mounting and/or pivoting point. On firearms, the barrel is sometimes mounted in a trunnion, which in turn is mounted to the receiver.
Turn bolt

A turn bolt refers to a firearm component that where the whole bolt without using a bolt carrier turns to lock/unlock. This is mostly used to describe manually operated bolt action firearms, but also on some automatic firearms.

== U ==
Upset forging

A process that increases the diameter of a workpiece by compressing its length.
Underlug
1. The locking lugs on a break-action firearm that extend from the bottom of the barrels under the chamber(s) and connect into the receiver bottom.
2. The metal shroud underneath the barrel of a revolver that surrounds and protects the extractor rod. The two types of underlugs include half-lug, meaning the shroud does not run the entire length of the barrel but instead is only as long as the extractor rod, and full-lug, meaning the shroud runs the full length of the barrel.
Underwater firearm

A firearm specially designed for use underwater.

== V ==
Varmint rifle

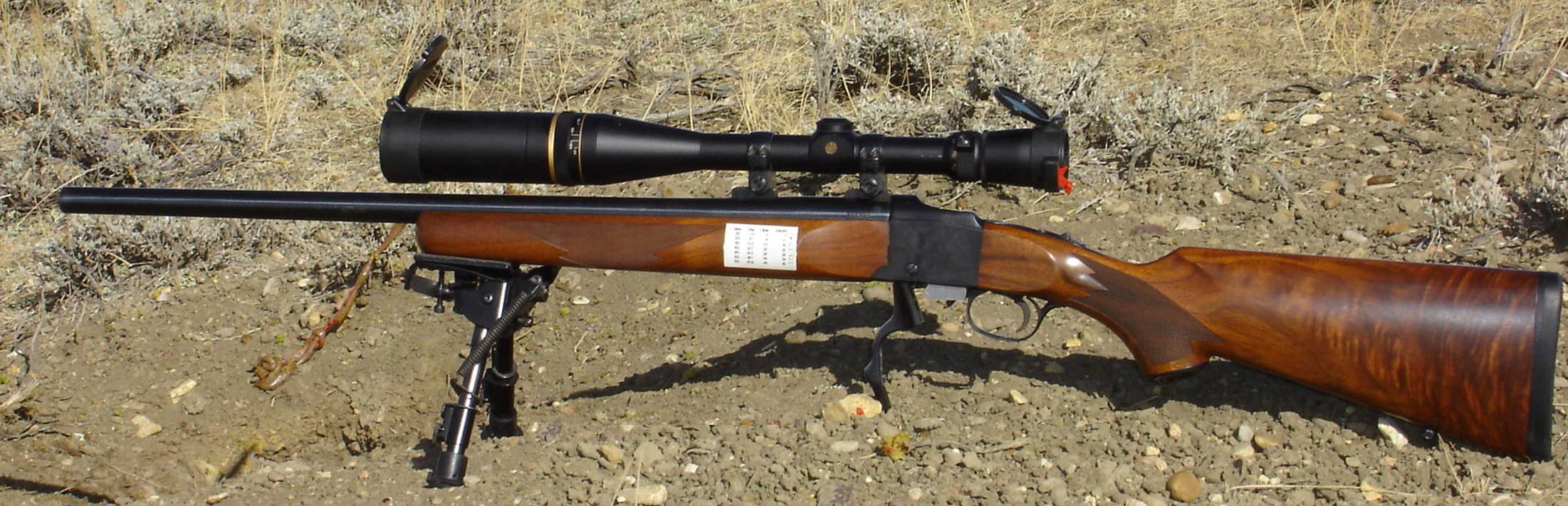
A Ruger No. 1 varmint rifle

A small-caliber firearm or high-powered air gun primarily used for varmint hunting—killing non-native or non-game animals such as rats, house sparrows, starling, crows, ground squirrels, gophers, jackrabbits, marmots, groundhogs, porcupine, opossum, coyote, skunks, weasels, or feral cats, dogs, goats, pigs, and other animals considered a nuisance vermin destructive to native or domestic plants and animals.
Velocity

The speed at which a projectile travels.

== W ==
Wadcutter

A special-purpose bullet specially designed for shooting paper targets, usually at close range and at subsonic velocities typically under 800 ft/s (240 m/s). They are often used in handgun and airgun competitions. A wadcutter has a flat or nearly flat front that cuts a very clean hole through the paper target, making it easier to score and ideally reducing errors in scoring the target to the favor of the shooter.
WCF

An acronym for a family of cartridges designed by Winchester Repeating Arms Company, called Winchester Center Fire, as in the .30–30 WCF or .32-20 WCF.
Wheellock

An obsolete mechanism for discharging a firearm.
Wildcat cartridge
wildcat

A custom cartridge for which ammunition and firearms are not mass-produced. These cartridges are often created to optimize a certain performance characteristic (such as the power, size or efficiency) of an existing commercial cartridge. See improved cartridge.
Windage

The side-to-side adjustment of a sight, used to change the horizontal component of the aiming point. See also Kentucky windage.

== X ==
X-ring
A circle in the middle of a shooting target bullseye used to determine winners in event of a tie.

== Y ==
Yaw

The heading of a bullet, used in external ballistics that refers to how the Magnus effect causes bullets to move out of a straight line based on their spin.

== Z ==
Zero-in
zeroing

The act of setting up a telescopic or other sighting system so that the point of impact of a bullet matches the sights at a specified distance.
Zero stop
A stopping mechanism found on some scope sights letting the user easily dial back their sight to the zeroing distance after having adjusted their sight to shoot at other distances.

== See also ==
- Firearm components
- Firearm terminology
- Glossary of military abbreviations
- List of established military terms
- List of military tactics
