= Internal ballistics =

Study of the propulsion of a projectile

Internal ballistics (also interior ballistics), a subfield of ballistics, is the study of the propulsion of a projectile.

In guns, internal ballistics covers the time from the propellant's ignition until the projectile exits the gun barrel. The study of internal ballistics is important to designers and users of firearms of all types, from small-bore rifles and pistols, to artillery.

For rocket-propelled projectiles, internal ballistics covers the period during which a rocket motor is providing thrust.

== General concepts ==
Interior ballistics can be considered in three time periods:

- Lock time - the time from sear release until the primer is struck
- Ignition time - the time from when the primer is struck until the projectile starts to move
- Barrel time - the time from when the projectile starts to move until it exits the barrel.

Diagram of internal ballistic phases

The burning firearm propellant produces energy in the form of hot gases that raise the chamber pressure which applies a force on the base of the projectile, causing it to accelerate. The chamber pressure depends on the amount of propellant that has burned, the temperature of the gases, and the volume of the chamber. The burn rate of the propellant depends on the chemical make up and shape of the propellant grains. The temperature depends on the energy released and the heat loss to the sides of the barrel and chamber.

As the projectile travels down the barrel, the volume the gas occupies behind the projectile increases. Some energy is lost in deforming the projectile and causing it to spin. There are also frictional losses between the projectile and the barrel. The projectile, as it travels down the barrel, compresses the air in front of it, which adds resistance to its forward motion.

The breech and the barrel must resist the high-pressure gases without damage. Although the pressure initially rises to a high value, the pressure starts dropping when the projectile has traveled some distance down the barrel. Consequently, the muzzle end of the barrel does not need to be as strong as the chamber end.

Mathematical models have been developed for these processes. The four general concepts which are calculated in interior ballistics are:

1. Energy - released by the propellant
2. Motion - the relation between the projectile acceleration and the pressure on its base.
3. Burning rate - a function of the propellant surface area and an empirically derived burning rate coefficient which is unique to the propellant.
4. Form function - a burning rate modifying coefficient that includes the shape of the propellant.

== History ==
Internal ballistics was not scientifically based prior to the mid-1800s. Barrels and actions were built strong enough to survive a known overload (Proof test). Muzzle velocity was surmised from the distance the projectile traveled.

In the 1800s test barrels began to be instrumented. Holes were drilled in the barrel and fitted with standardized steel pistons which exerted pressure which compressed standardized copper cylinders when the firearm discharged. The reduction in the copper cylinder length is used as an indication of peak pressure, known as "Copper Units of Pressure", or "CUP" for high pressure firearms. Similar standards were applied to firearms with lower peak pressures, typically common handguns, with test cylinder pellets made of more easily deformed lead cylinders, hence "Lead Units of Pressure", or "LUP". The measurement only indicated the maximum pressure that was reached at that point in the barrel. Piezoelectric strain gauges were introduced in the 1960's, allowing instantaneous pressures to be measured without destructive pressure ports. Instrumented projectiles were developed by the Army Research Laboratory that measures the pressure at the base of the projectile and acceleration.

== Priming methods ==
Methods of igniting the propellant evolved over time. A small hole (a touch hole) was drilled into the breech, into which a propellant was then poured, and an external flame or spark applied (see matchlock and flintlock). Percussion caps and self-contained cartridges have primers that detonate after mechanical deformation, igniting the propellant.

== Propellants ==
=== Black powder ===
Gunpowder (Black powder) is a finely ground, pressed and granulated mechanical pyrotechnic mixture of sulfur, charcoal, and potassium nitrate or sodium nitrate. It can be produced in a range of grain sizes. The size and shape of the grains can increase or decrease the relative surface area, and change the burning rate significantly. The burning rate of black powder is relatively insensitive to pressure, meaning it will burn quickly and predictably even without confinement, making it also suitable for use as a low explosive. It has a very slow decomposition rate, and therefore a very low brisance. It is not, in the strictest sense of the term, an explosive, but a "deflagrant", as it does not detonate but decomposes by deflagration due to its subsonic mechanism of flame-front propagation.

=== Nitrocellulose (single-base propellants) ===
Nitrocellulose or "guncotton" is formed by the action of nitric acid on cellulose fibers. It is a highly combustible fibrous material that deflagrates rapidly when heat is applied. It also burns very cleanly, burning almost entirely to gaseous components at high temperatures with little smoke or solid residue. Gelatinised nitrocellulose is a plastic, which can be formed into cylinders, tubes, balls, or flakes known as single-base propellants. The size and shape of the propellant grains can increase or decrease the relative surface area, and change the burn rate significantly. Additives and coatings can be added to the propellant to further modify the burn rate. Normally, very fast powders are used for light-bullet or low-velocity pistols and shotguns, medium-rate powders for magnum pistols and light rifle rounds, and slow powders for large-bore heavy rifle rounds.

=== Double-base propellants ===
Nitroglycerin can be added to nitrocellulose to form "double-base propellants". Nitrocellulose desensitizes nitroglycerin to prevent detonation in propellant-sized grains, (see dynamite), and the nitroglycerin gelatinises the nitrocellulose and increases the energy. Double-base powders burn faster than single-base powders of the same shape, though not as cleanly, and burn rate increases with nitroglycerin content.

In artillery, Ballistite or Cordite has been used in the form of rods, tubes, slotted-tube, perforated-cylinder or multi-tubular; the geometry being chosen to provide the required burning characteristics. (Round balls or rods, for example, are "degressive-burning" because their production of gas decreases with their surface area as the balls or rods burn smaller; thin flakes are "neutral-burning," since they burn on their flat surfaces until the flake is completely consumed. The longitudally perforated or multi-perforated cylinders used in large, long-barreled rifles or cannon are "progressive-burning;" the burning surface increases as the inside diameter of the holes enlarges, giving sustained burning and a long, continuous push on the projectile to produce higher velocity without increasing the peak pressure unduly. Progressive-burning powder compensates somewhat for the pressure drop as the projectile accelerates down the bore and increases the volume behind it.)

=== Solid propellants (caseless ammunition) ===
"Caseless ammunition" incorporates propellant cast as a single solid grain with the priming compound placed in a hollow at the base and the bullet attached to the front. Since the single propellant grain is so large (most smokeless powders have grain sizes around 1 mm, but a caseless grain will be perhaps 7 mm diameter and 15 mm long), the relative burn rate must be much higher. To reach this rate of burning, caseless propellants often use moderated explosives, such as RDX.

The major advantages of a successful caseless round would be elimination of the need to extract and eject the spent cartridge case, permitting higher rates of fire and a simpler mechanism, and also reduced ammunition weight by eliminating the weight (and cost) of the brass or steel case.

While there is at least one experimental military rifle (the H&K G11), and one commercial rifle (the Voere VEC-91), that use caseless rounds, they have met with little success. One other commercial rifle was the Daisy VL rifle made by the Daisy Air Rifle Co. and chambered for .22 caliber caseless ammunition that was ignited by a hot blast of compressed air from the lever used to compress a strong spring like for an air rifle. The caseless ammunition is of course not reloadable, since there is no casing left after firing the bullet, and the exposed propellant makes the rounds less durable. Also, the case in a standard cartridge serves as a seal, keeping gas from escaping the breech. Caseless arms must use a more complex self-sealing breech, which increases the design and manufacturing complexity. Another unpleasant problem, common to all rapid-firing arms but particularly problematic for those firing caseless rounds, is the problem of rounds "cooking off". This problem is caused by residual heat from the chamber heating the round in the chamber to the point where it ignites, causing an unintentional discharge.

To minimize the risk of cartridge cook-off, machineguns can be designed to fire from an open bolt, with the round not chambered until the trigger is pulled, and so there is no chance for the round to cook off before the operator is ready. Such weapons could use caseless ammunition effectively. Open-bolt designs are generally undesirable for anything but machine guns; the mass of the bolt moving forward causes the gun to lurch in reaction, which significantly reduces the accuracy of the gun, which is generally not an issue for machinegun fire.

== Propellant charge ==
=== Load density and consistency ===
Load density is the percentage of the space in the cartridge case that is filled with powder. In general, loads close to 100% density (or even loads where seating the bullet in the case compresses the powder) ignite and burn more consistently than lower-density loads. In cartridges surviving from the black-powder era (examples being .45 Colt, .45-70 Government), the case is much larger than is needed to hold the maximum charge of high-density smokeless powder. This extra room allows the powder to shift in the case, piling up near the front or back of the case and potentially causing significant variations in burning rate, as powder near the rear of the case will ignite rapidly but powder near the front of the case will ignite later. This change has less impact with fast powders. Such high-capacity, low-density cartridges generally deliver best accuracy with the fastest appropriate powder, although this keeps the total energy low due to the sharp high-pressure peak.

Magnum pistol cartridges reverse this power/accuracy tradeoff by using lower-density, slower-burning powders that give high load density and a broad pressure curve. The downside is the increased recoil and muzzle blast from the high powder mass, and high muzzle pressure.

Most rifle cartridges have a high load density with the appropriate powders. Rifle cartridges tend to be bottlenecked, with a wide base narrowing down to a smaller diameter, to hold a light, high-velocity bullet. These cases are designed to hold a large charge of low-density powder, for an even broader pressure curve than a magnum pistol cartridge. These cases require the use of a long rifle barrel to extract their full efficiency, although they are also chambered in rifle-like pistols (single-shot or bolt-action) with barrels of 10 to 15 inches (25 to 38 cm).

== Chamber ==
=== Straight vs bottleneck ===
Straight walled cases were the standard from the beginnings of cartridge arms. With the low burning speed of black powder, the best efficiency was achieved with large, heavy bullets, so the bullet was the largest practical diameter. The large diameter allowed a short, stable bullet with high weight, and the maximum practical bore volume to extract the most energy possible in a given length barrel. There were a few cartridges that had long, shallow tapers, but these were generally an attempt to use an existing cartridge to fire a smaller bullet with a higher velocity and lower recoil. With the advent of smokeless powders, it was possible to generate far higher velocities by using a slow smokeless powder in a large volume case, pushing a small, light bullet. The odd, highly tapered 8 mm Lebel, made by necking down an older 11 mm black-powder cartridge, was introduced in 1886, and it was soon followed by the 7.92×57mm Mauser and 7×57mm Mauser military rounds, and the commercial .30-30 Winchester, all of which were new designs built to use smokeless powder. All of these have a distinct shoulder that closely resembles modern cartridges, and with the exception of the Lebel they are still chambered in modern firearms even though the cartridges are over a century old.

=== Aspect ratio and consistency ===
When selecting a rifle cartridge for maximum accuracy, a short, fat cartridge with very little case taper may yield higher efficiency and more consistent velocity than a long, thin cartridge with a lot of case taper (part of the reason for a bottle-necked design). Given current trends towards shorter and fatter cases, such as the new Winchester Super Short Magnum cartridges, it appears the ideal might be a case approaching spherical inside. Target and vermin hunting rounds require the greatest accuracy, so their cases tend to be short, fat, and nearly untapered with sharp shoulders on the case. Short, fat cases also allow short-action weapons to be made lighter and stronger for the same level of performance. The trade-off for this performance is fat rounds which take up more space in a magazine, sharp shoulders that do not feed as easily out of a magazine, and less reliable extraction of the spent round. For these reasons, when reliable feeding is more important than accuracy, such as with military rifles, longer cases with shallower shoulder angles are favored. There has been a long-term trend however, even among military weapons, towards shorter, fatter cases. The current 7.62×51mm NATO case replacing the longer .30-06 Springfield is a good example, as is the new 6.5 Grendel cartridge designed to increase the performance of the AR-15 family of rifles and carbines. Nevertheless, there is significantly more to accuracy and cartridge lethality than the length and diameter of the case, and the 7.62×51mm NATO has a smaller case capacity than the .30-06 Springfield, reducing the amount of propellant that can be used, directly reducing the bullet weight and muzzle velocity combination that contributes to lethality, (as detailed in the published cartridge specifications linked herein for comparison). The 6.5 Grendel, on the other hand, is capable of firing a significantly heavier bullet (see link) than the 5.56 NATO out of the AR-15 family of weapons, with only a slight decrease in muzzle velocity, perhaps providing a more advantageous performance tradeoff.

== Friction and inertia ==
=== Static friction and ignition ===
Since the burning rate of smokeless powder varies directly with the pressure, the initial pressure buildup,(i.e. "the shot-start pressure"), has a significant effect on the final velocity, especially in large cartridges with very fast powders and relatively light weight projectiles. In small caliber firearms, the friction holding the bullet in the case, determines how soon after ignition the bullet moves, and since the motion of the bullet increases the volume and drops the pressure, a difference in friction can change the slope of the pressure curve. In general, a tight fit is desired, to the extent of crimping the bullet into the case. In straight-walled rimless cases, such as the .45 ACP, an aggressive crimp is not possible, since the case is held in the chamber by the mouth of the case, but sizing the case to allow a tight interference fit with the bullet, can give the desired result. In larger caliber firearms, the shot start pressure is often determined by the force required to initially engrave the projectile driving band into the start of the barrel rifling; smoothbore guns, which do not have rifling, achieve shot start pressure by initially driving the projectile into a "forcing cone" that provides resistance as it compresses the projectile obturation ring.

=== Kinetic friction ===
The bullet must tightly fit the bore to seal the high pressure of the burning gunpowder. This tight fit results in a large frictional force. The friction of the bullet in the bore does have a slight impact on the final velocity, but that is generally not much of a concern. Of greater concern is the heat that is generated due to the friction. At velocities of about 300 m/s (980 ft/s), lead begins to melt, and deposit in the bore. This lead build-up constricts the bore, increasing the pressure and decreasing the accuracy of subsequent rounds, and is difficult to scrub out without damaging the bore. Rounds, used at velocities up to 460 m/s (1,500 ft/s), can use wax lubricants on the bullet to reduce lead build-up. At velocities over 460 m/s (1,500 ft/s), nearly all bullets are jacketed in copper, or a similar alloy that is soft enough not to wear on the barrel, but melts at a high enough temperature to reduce build-up in the bore. Copper build-up does begin to occur in rounds that exceed 760 m/s (2,500 ft/s), and a common solution is to impregnate the surface of the bullet with molybdenum disulfide lubricant. This reduces copper build-up in the bore, and results in better long-term accuracy. Large caliber projectiles also employ copper driving bands for rifled barrels for spin-stabilized projectiles; however, fin-stabilized projectiles fired from both rifle and smoothbore barrels, such as the APFSDS anti-armor projectiles, employ nylon obturation rings that are sufficient to seal high pressure propellant gasses and also minimize in-bore friction, providing a small boost to muzzle velocity.

=== The role of inertia ===
In the first few centimeters of travel down the bore, the bullet reaches a significant percentage of its final velocity, even for high-capacity rifles, with slow burning powder. The acceleration is on the order of tens of thousands of gravities, so even a projectile as light as 40 grains (2.6 g) can provide over 1,000 newtons (220 lbf) of resistance due to inertia. Changes in bullet mass, therefore, have a huge impact on the pressure curves of smokeless powder cartridges, unlike black-powder cartridges. The loading or reloading of smokeless cartridges thus requires high-precision equipment, and carefully measured tables of load data for given cartridges, powders, and bullet weights.

== Pressure-velocity relationships ==
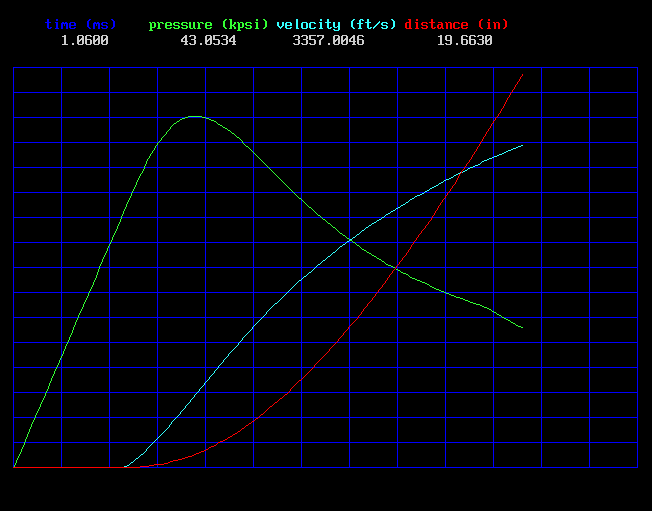
This is a graph of a simulation of the 5.56 mm NATO round, being fired from a 20-inch (510 mm) barrel. The horizontal axis represents time, the vertical axis represents pressure (green line), bullet travel (red line), and bullet velocity (light blue line). The values shown at top are peak values

Energy is imparted to the bullet in a firearm by the pressure of gases produced by burning propellant. While higher pressures produce higher velocities, pressure duration is also important. Peak pressure may represent only a small fraction of the time the bullet is accelerating. The entire duration of the bullet's travel through the barrel must be considered.

=== Peak vs area ===
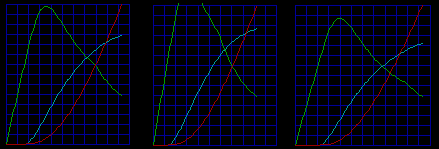
This graph shows different pressure curves for powders with different burn rates. The leftmost graph is the same as the large graph above. The middle graph shows a powder with a 25% faster burn rate, and the rightmost graph shows a powder with a 20% slower burn rate.

Energy is the ability to do work on an object. Work is force applied over a distance. The total energy imparted to a bullet is indicated by the area under a curve with the y-axis being force (i.e., the pressure exerted on the base of the bullet multiplied by the area of the base of the bullet) and the x-axis being distance. Increasing the energy of the bullet requires increasing the area under that curve, either by raising the pressure, or increasing the distance the bullet travels under pressure. Pressure is limited by the strength of the firearm, and duration is limited by barrel length.

== Propellant design ==
Propellants are matched to firearm strength, chamber volume and barrel length; and bullet material, weight and dimensions. The rate of gas generation is proportional to the surface area of burning propellant grains in accordance with Piobert's Law. Smokeless propellant reactions occur in a series of zones or phases as the reaction proceeds from the surface into the solid. The deepest portion of the solid experiencing heat transfer melts and begins phase transition from solid to gas in a foam zone. The gaseous propellant decomposes into simpler molecules in a surrounding fizz zone. Endothermic transformations in the foam zone and fizz zone require energy initially provided by the primer and subsequently released in a luminous outer flame zone where the simpler gas molecules react to form conventional combustion products like steam and carbon monoxide.

The heat transfer rate of smokeless propellants increases with pressure, resulting in the rate of gas generation from a given grain surface area increased at higher pressures. Accelerating gas generation from fast burning propellants may rapidly create a destructively high pressure spike before bullet movement increases reaction volume. Conversely, propellants designed for a minimum heat transfer pressure may cease decomposition into gaseous reactants if bullet movement decreases pressure before a slow burning propellant has been consumed. Unburned propellant grains may remain in the barrel if the energy-releasing flame zone cannot be sustained in the resultant absence of gaseous reactants from the inner zones.

=== Propellant burnout ===
Another issue to consider, when choosing a powder burn rate, is the time the powder takes to completely burn vs. the time the bullet spends in the barrel. Looking carefully at the left graph, there is a change in the curve, at about 0.8 ms. This is the point at which the powder is completely burned, and no new gas is created. With a faster powder, burnout occurs earlier, and with the slower powder, it occurs later. Propellant that is unburned when the bullet reaches the muzzle is wasted — it adds no energy to the bullet, but it does add to the recoil and muzzle blast. For maximum power, the powder should burn until the bullet is just short of the muzzle.

Since smokeless powders burn, not detonate, the reaction can only take place on the surface of the powder. Smokeless powders come in a variety of shapes, which serve to determine how fast they burn, and also how the burn rate changes as the powder burns. The simplest shape is a ball powder, which is in the form of round or slightly flattened spheres. Ball powder has a comparatively small surface-area-to-volume ratio, so it burns comparatively slowly, and as it burns, its surface area decreases. This means as the powder burns, the burn rate slows down.

To some degree, this can be offset by the use of a retardant coating on the surface of the powder, which slows the initial burn rate and flattens out the rate of change. Ball powders are generally formulated as slow pistol powders, or fast rifle powders.

Flake powders are in the form of flat, round flakes which have a relatively high surface-area-to-volume ratio. Flake powders have a nearly constant rate of burn, and are usually formulated as fast pistol or shotgun powders. The last common shape is an extruded powder, which is in the form of a cylinder, sometimes hollow. Extruded powders generally have a lower ratio of nitroglycerin to nitrocellulose, and are often progressive burning — that is, they burn at a faster rate as they burn. Extruded powders are generally medium to slow rifle powders.

== General concerns ==
=== Bore diameter and energy transfer ===
A firearm, in many ways, is like a piston engine on the power stroke. There is a certain amount of high-pressure gas available, and energy is extracted from it by making the gas move a piston — in this case, the projectile is the piston. The swept volume of the piston determines how much energy can be extracted from the given gas. The more volume that is swept by the piston, the lower is the exhaust pressure (in this case, the muzzle pressure). Any remaining pressure at the muzzle or at the end of the engine's power stroke represents lost energy.

To extract the maximum amount of energy, then, the swept volume is maximized. This can be done in one of two ways — increasing the length of the barrel or increasing the diameter of the projectile. Increasing the barrel length will increase the swept volume linearly, while increasing the diameter will increase the swept volume as the square of the diameter. Since barrel length is limited by practical concerns to about arm's length for a rifle and much shorter for a handgun, increasing bore diameter is the normal way to increase the efficiency of a cartridge. The limit to bore diameter is generally the sectional density of the projectile (see external ballistics). Larger-diameter bullets of the same weight have much more drag, and so they lose energy more quickly after exiting the barrel. In general, most handguns use bullets between .355 (9 mm) and .45 (11.5 mm) caliber, while most rifles generally range from .223 (5.56 mm) to .32 (8 mm) caliber. There are many exceptions, of course, but bullets in the given ranges provide the best general-purpose performance. Handguns use the larger-diameter bullets for greater efficiency in short barrels, and tolerate the long-range velocity loss since handguns are seldom used for long-range shooting. Handguns designed for long-range shooting are generally closer to shortened rifles than to other handguns.

=== Ratio of propellant to projectile mass ===
Another issue, when choosing or developing a cartridge, is the issue of recoil. The recoil is not just the reaction from the projectile being launched, but also from the powder gas, which will exit the barrel with a velocity even higher than that of the bullet. For handgun cartridges, with heavy bullets and light powder charges (a 9×19mm, for example, might use 5 grains (320 mg) of powder, and a 115 grains (7.5 g) bullet), the powder recoil is not a significant force; for a rifle cartridge (a .22-250 Remington, using 40 grains (2.6 g) of powder and a 40 grains (2.6 g) bullet), the powder can be the majority of the recoil force.

There is a solution to the recoil issue, though it is not without cost. A muzzle brake or recoil compensator is a device which redirects the powder gas at the muzzle, usually up and back. This acts like a rocket, pushing the muzzle down and forward. The forward push helps negate the feel of the projectile recoil by pulling the firearm forwards. The downward push, on the other hand, helps counteract the rotation imparted by the fact that most firearms have the barrel mounted above the center of gravity. Overt combat guns, large-bore high-powered rifles, long-range handguns chambered for rifle ammunition, and action-shooting handguns designed for accurate rapid fire, all benefit from muzzle brakes.

The high-powered firearms use the muzzle brake mainly for recoil reduction, which reduces the battering of the shooter by the severe recoil. The action-shooting handguns redirect all the energy up to counteract the rotation of the recoil, and make following shots faster by leaving the gun on target. The disadvantage of the muzzle brake is a longer, heavier barrel, and a large increase in sound levels and flash behind the muzzle of the rifle. Shooting firearms without muzzle brakes and without hearing protection can eventually damage the operator's hearing; however, shooting rifles with muzzle brakes - with or without hearing protection - causes permanent ear damage. (See muzzle brake for more on the disadvantages of muzzle brakes.)

Powder-to-projectile-weight ratio also touches on the subject of efficiency. In the case of the .22-250 Remington, more energy goes into propelling the powder gas than goes into propelling the bullet. The .22-250 pays for this by requiring a large case, with much powder, all for a fairly small gain in velocity and energy over other .22 caliber cartridges.

=== Accuracy and bore characteristics ===
Nearly all small bore firearms, with the exception of shotguns, have rifled barrels. The rifling imparts a spin on the bullet, which keeps it from tumbling in flight. The rifling is usually in the form of sharp edged grooves cut as helices along the axis of the bore, anywhere from 2 to 16 in number. The areas between the grooves are known as lands.

Another system, polygonal rifling, gives the bore a polygonal cross section. Polygonal rifling is not very common, used by only a few European manufacturers as well as the American gun manufacturer Kahr Arms. The companies that use polygonal rifling claim greater accuracy, lower friction, and less lead and/or copper buildup in the barrel. Traditional land and groove rifling is used in most competition firearms, however, so the advantages of polygonal rifling are unproven.

There are four methods of rifling a barrel:

- A single point cutter is drawn down the bore by a machine that controls the rotation of the cutting head relative to the barrel. This is the slowest process, but requires the simplest equipment. It is often used by custom gunsmiths as it can result in very accurate barrels.
- Button rifling uses a die with a negative image of the rifling cut on it which is drawn down the barrel while rotated, swaging the inside of the barrel. This creates all the grooves at once by deformation, and is faster than cut rifling.
- Hammer forging is a process in which a slightly oversized, bored barrel is placed around a mandrel that contains a negative image of the length of the rifled barrel. The barrel and mandrel are rotated and hammered by power hammers, which forms the inside of the barrel. This is the fastest and often cheapest method of making a barrel, but the equipment is expensive. Hammer-forged barrels are generally not capable of the accuracy attainable with the first two methods mentioned.
- Electrical discharge machining (EDM) or Electro chemical machining (ECM) processes use electricity to erode away material, a process which produces a highly consistent diameter and very smooth finish, with less stress than other rifling methods. EDM is very costly and primarily used in large bore, long barrel cannon where traditional methods are very difficult, while ECM is used by some smaller barrel makers.

The purpose of the barrel is to provide a consistent seal, allowing the bullet to accelerate to a consistent velocity. It must also impart the right spin, and release the bullet consistently, perfectly concentric to the bore. The residual pressure in the bore must be released symmetrically, so that no side of the bullet receives any more or less push than the rest.

To maintain a good pressure seal, the bore must be a precise constant diameter, or have a slight decrease in diameter from breech to muzzle. Any increase in bore diameter will allow the bullet to shift, allowing gas to leak past the bullet, decreasing velocity, or cause the bullet to tip so that it is no longer perfectly coaxial with the bore. High quality barrels are lapped to remove any constrictions in the bore which will cause a change in diameter.

A lapping process known as "fire lapping" uses a lead "slug" that is slightly larger than the bore and covered in fine abrasive compound to cut out the constrictions. The slug is passed from breech to muzzle to remove obstructions. Many passes are made, and as the bore becomes more uniform, finer grades of abrasive compound are used. The final result is a barrel that is mirror-smooth, and with a consistent or slightly tapering bore. The hand-lapping technique uses a wooden or soft metal rod to pull or push the slug through the bore, while the newer fire-lapping technique uses specially loaded, low-power cartridges to push abrasive-covered soft-lead bullets down the barrel.

Another issue that has an effect on the barrel's hold on the bullet is the rifling. When the bullet is fired, it is forced into the rifling, which cuts or "engraves" the surface of the bullet. If the rifling is a constant twist, then the rifling rides in the grooves engraved in the bullet, and everything is secure and sealed. If the rifling has a decreasing twist, then the changing angle of the rifling in the engraved grooves of the bullet causes the rifling to become narrower than the grooves. This allows gas to blow by, and loosens the hold of the bullet on the barrel. An increasing twist, however, will make the rifling become wider than the grooves in the bullet, maintaining the seal. When a rifled-barrel blank is selected for a gun, the higher-twist end is located at the muzzle.

The muzzle of the barrel is the last thing to touch the bullet before it goes into ballistic flight, and as such has the greatest potential to disrupt the bullet's flight. The muzzle must allow the gas to escape the barrel symmetrically; any asymmetry will cause an uneven pressure on the base of the bullet, which will disrupt its flight. The muzzle end of the barrel is called the "crown", and it is usually either beveled or recessed to protect it from bumps or scratches that might affect accuracy.

Before the barrel can release the bullet in a consistent manner, it must grip the bullet in a consistent manner. The part of the barrel between where the bullet exits the cartridge, and engages the rifling, is called the "throat", and the length of the throat is the freebore. In some firearms, the freebore is zero as the act of chambering the cartridge forces the bullet into the rifling. This is common in low-powered rimfire target rifles. The placement of the bullet in the rifling ensures that the transition between cartridge and rifling is quick and stable. The downside is that the cartridge is firmly held in place, and attempting to extract the unfired round can be difficult, to the point of even pulling the bullet from the cartridge in extreme cases.

With high-powered cartridges, a significant amount of force is required to engrave the bullet which can raise the pressure in the chamber above the maximum design pressure. Higher-powered rifles usually have a longer freebore so that the bullet is allowed to gain some momentum, allowing the and the chamber pressure to drop slightly before the bullet engages the rifling. However, any slight misalignment can cause the bullet to tip as it engages the rifling, resulting in the bullet does not entering the barrel coaxially.

=== Revolver-specific issues ===
The defining characteristic of a revolver is the revolving cylinder, separate from the barrel, that contains the chambers. Revolvers typically have 5 to 10 chambers, and the first issue is ensuring consistency among the chambers, because if they aren't consistent then the point of impact will vary from chamber to chamber. The chambers must also align consistently with the barrel, so the bullet enters the barrel the same way from each chamber.

The throat in a revolver is composed of two separate parts, the cylinder throat and the barrel throat, and sized so that it is concentric to the chamber and slightly greater circumference than the bullet diameter. The cylinder gap - the space between the cylinder throat and barrel - must be wide enough to allow free rotation of the cylinder even when it becomes fouled with powder residue, but not so large that excessive gas is released. The forcing cone - where the bullet is guided from the cylinder into the bore of the barrel - should be deep enough to force the bullet into the bore without significant deformation. Unlike rifles, where the threaded portion of the barrel is in the chamber, revolver barrels threads surround the breech end of the bore. It is possible that the bore is compressed when the barrel is screwed into the frame. Cutting a longer forcing cone can relieve this "choke" point, as can lapping of the barrel after it is fitted to the frame.

== See also ==
- External ballistics
- Percussion cap, for an early history of priming powder and percussion caps
- Terminal ballistics
- Transitional ballistics
- Physics of firearms
- Table of handgun and rifle cartridges
