= Black powder substitute =

Substitute for black powder

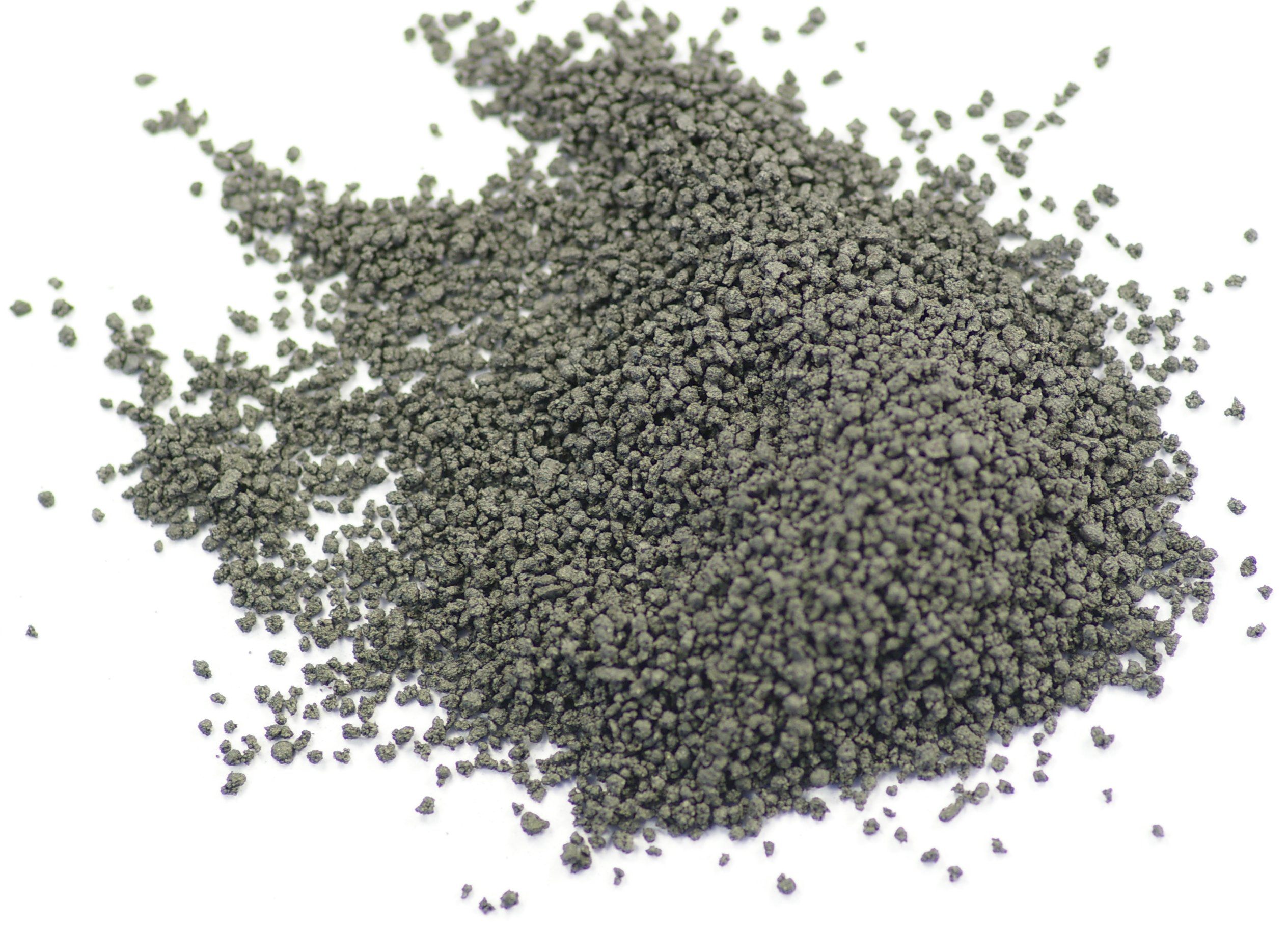
Pyrodex, a modern black powder substitute for muzzleloaders, in FFG RS (Rifle/Shotgun) size

A black powder substitute is a replacement for black powder (gunpowder), primarily used in muzzleloading firearms. Substitutes may have slightly different properties from gunpowder such as: reduced sensitivity as an explosive, increased efficiency as a propellant powder, different density, and/or reduced ignition efficiency. This also means that substitutes are subject to different restrictions than gunpowder.

== Uses ==
Black powder was the first explosive ever invented, and was the primary propellant used firearms around the world for many centuries. However, in modern times, smokeless powder has largely replaced black powder as the most common firearm propellant. Still, black powder remains in use for certain types of firearms, including historical weapons from before the invention of smokeless powder, such as muzzleloaders. Black powder substitutes are propellants designed to provide explosive force similar to that of black powder, primarily for use in such firearms, despite being legally classified as "smokeless propellant".

In the United States, many states mandate the use of black powder or "equivalent" black powder substitutes during the portion of deer hunting season in which only muzzleloading firearms can be used, and many outright prohibit the use of smokeless powders during this time.

== Types ==
Hodgdon's Pyrodex is a widely available substitute for black powder. Pyrodex is less sensitive to ignition than black powder. It also contains more energy per unit of mass than black powder, but is less dense. Therefore, it is often substituted at a 1:1 ratio by volume for black powder. Pyrodex is similar in composition to black powder (which consists of potassium nitrate, charcoal, and sulfur) but incorporates several other compounds:

- 45% potassium nitrate
- 9% charcoal
- 6% sulfur
- 19% potassium perchlorate
- 11% sodium benzoate
- 6% dicyandiamide
- 4% dextrin
- 1% water

Pyrodex has a slower combustion and produces a lower maximum pressure than black powder yet provides the same amount of work and a higher projectile velocity. It is often used for shooting historical weapons. It was originally available as loose powder in two granularities, RS (Rifle/Shotgun) and P (Pistol), where RS (Rifle/Shotgun) is equivalent to FFg black powder and P (Pistol) is equivalent to FFFg black powder on the Fg (coarsest) to FFFFg (finest) granularity scale. While Pyrodex offers improved safety and increased efficiency (in terms of shots per pound of powder) over black powder, the level of fouling is similar to black powder as Pyrodex is caustic and corrosive. Therefore, the same cleaning regimen used on black powder fouling must be employed when Pyrodex has been used.

Hodgdon also makes "Triple Seven", a sulfur-free black powder substitute containing potassium perchlorate and 3-Nitrobenzoic acid, and "Black Mag3". These are both more energetic by mass than black powder and can produce higher velocities and pressures. Triple Seven is a volumetric substitute for black powder, and due to its higher velocity, it is recommended to reduce the load by 15%. The carbon-based fuel burned in this case is from the sugar family, not from charcoal.

== Measurement ==
The grain is the traditional measurement of the weight of bullets, black powder and smokeless powder in English-speaking countries. It is the unit measured by the scales used in handloading; commonly, bullets are measured in increments of one grain, gunpowder in increments of 0.1 grains. There are 7,000 grains in one pound.

Black powder substitutes are formulated to be a volume-for-volume equivalent of black powder, not an equivalent mass-for-mass (weight-for-weight). Black powder substitutes are measured by volumetric measurement techniques, not in grains on a scale, due to the difference in density compared to black powder. For example, to measure a "60 grain equivalent" of black powder substitute suitable for use in a muzzleloader rifle, one uses a volumetric measure that produces a volume of black powder equivalent equal to the volume of a mass of 60 grains of black powder. For example, because Pyrodex, a common black powder substitute, is less dense than black powder, a measurement by weight on a scale of 60 grains of mass of Pyrodex would be near a 30 percent overload.

Volume equivalence is a benefit in loading muzzleloading firearms, traditionally loaded using volumetric measures. This becomes an issue when fabricating black-powder cartridges through handloading using a black-powder substitute in place of black powder, since it is common practice to measure by weight when loading cartridges (there are published conversion tables).

== Disadvantages ==
With the increased safety of the black powder substitutes often comes a reduced sensitivity to ignition. Flintlocks in particular need very sensitive, finely granulated powder for use in the flash pan, and black powder tends to perform more reliably in these and traditional caplock guns than substitutes. Modern in-line muzzleloaders provide a stronger ignition than traditional designs and this helps to increase reliability with less flame-sensitive substitutes. In addition, magnum percussion caps are often recommended for use with black powder substitutes for both inline and traditional caplock guns, in place of the #11 percussion caps traditionally used with black powder in these guns, to achieve the best ignition reliability.

When used for recovery system ejection charges in high-power rocketry, black powder substitutes need a greater degree of confinement to ensure a complete burn and generation of sufficient ejection pressure. This can be achieved by wrapping 2–3 layers of electrical tape over the ejection charge canister before installation.

== Legality ==
=== United States ===
Black powder substitutes can be transported and stored in interstate commerce in the United States using the smokeless powder regulations instead of the more restrictive black powder regulations. As a result, black powder substitutes are becoming more commonly available than traditional black powder.

=== United Kingdom ===
Prior to July 2024, Pyrodex was classified as UN0161 and therefore benefited for an exemption under the Explosives Regulations 2014, meaning that it did not require a certificate to buy or store in the United Kingdom; an RCA (recipient competent authority) document was also not needed for transportation.

In 2024, the manufacturer of Pyrodex changed the product's classification, resulting in the exemption previously afforded to it no longer applying and it can now only be purchased and possessed with an Explosives Certificate covering UN0499 and UN0501. It must also be stored in the same fashion as black powder, namely in a locked wooden box with adequate separation distance and internal volume.

There are varying opinions as to whether Pyrodex bought prior to the reclassification and having the previous UN0161 number can be possessed without a certificate, with some English police forces considering one necessary while other organisations take a different position, namely that the applicable UN classification is the one that applied when the product was manufactured and packaged.

== See also ==
- Black powder
- Smokeless powder
- Firearm propellant
- Muzzleloader
- Handloading

== Citations ==
- Pyrodex MSDS Material safety data sheet
- Triple Seven MSDS
