= Piobert's law =

Chemical law

Piobert's law applies to the reaction of solid propellant grains to generate hot gas. It is stated: "Burning takes place by parallel layers where the surface of the grain regresses, layer by layer, normal to the surface at every point."

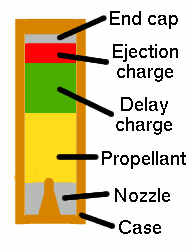
The propellant grain of this model rocket engine is designed to function in accordance with Piobert's law.

== History ==
The law was devised by French general Guillaume Piobert (in French) in 1839 to explain the behavior of gunpowder, but it has subsequently been applied to other solid propellants. Description of the reaction as burning may cause confusion with simple atmospheric combustion of solid materials where a similar reaction progression may be attributed to availability of the oxygen reactant only at the surface of the solid being consumed by the reaction. In the case of single-phase propellant grains, the progression is attributed to heat transfer from the surface of the solid of energy necessary to initiate the reaction. The heat transfer rate increases with pressure; and smokeless powder reaction rates vary with pressure as described by Paul Vieille in 1893.

== Mechanism ==
Studies of solid single- and double-base propellant reactions suggest a series of zones or phases as the reaction proceeds from the surface into the solid. The deepest portion of the solid experiencing heat transfer melts and begins phase transition from solid to gas in a foam zone. The gaseous propellant decomposes into simpler molecules in a surrounding fizz zone. Energy is released in a luminous outer flame zone where the simpler gas molecules react to form conventional combustion products like steam and carbon monoxide. Propellants designed for a minimum heat transfer pressure may fail to sustain the flame zone at lower pressures.

== Bibliography ==
G. Piobert, Mémoire sur les poudres de guerre, des différents procédés de frabrication (1844)
