= Transitional ballistics =

Schlieren High-Speed Video Of Shotshell Transitional Intermediate Ballistics.

Transitional ballistics, also known as intermediate ballistics, is the study of a projectile's behavior from the time it leaves the muzzle until the pressure behind the projectile is equalized, so it lies between internal ballistics and external ballistics.

== The transitional period ==
Transitional ballistics is a complex field that involves a number of variables that are not fully understood; therefore, it is not an exact science. When the bullet reaches the muzzle of the barrel, the escaping gases are still, in many cases, at hundreds of atmospheres of pressure. Once the bullet exits the barrel, breaking the seal, the gases are free to move past the bullet and expand in all directions. This expansion is what gives gunfire its explosive sound (in conjunction with the sonic boom of the projectile), and is often accompanied by a bright flash as the gases combine with the oxygen in the air and finish combusting.

The propellant gases continue to exert force on the bullet and firearm for a short while after the bullet leaves the barrel. One of the essential elements of accurizing a firearm is to make sure that this force does not disrupt the bullet from its path. The worst case is a muzzle or muzzle device such as a flash-hider that is cut at a non-square angle, so that one side of the bullet leaves the barrel early; this will cause the gas to escape in an asymmetric pattern, and will push the bullet away from that side, causing shots to form a "string", where the shots cluster along a line rather than forming a normal Gaussian pattern.

Most firearms have muzzle velocities in excess of the ambient speed of sound, and even in subsonic cartridges the escaping gases will exceed the speed of sound, forming a shock wave. This wave will quickly slow as the expanding gas cools, dropping the speed of sound within the expanding gas, but at close range this shockwave can be very damaging. The muzzle blast from a high powered cartridge can literally shred soft objects in its vicinity, as careless benchrest pistol shooters occasionally find out when the muzzle slips back onto their sandbag and the muzzle blast sends sand flying.

== Initial velocity calculation ==
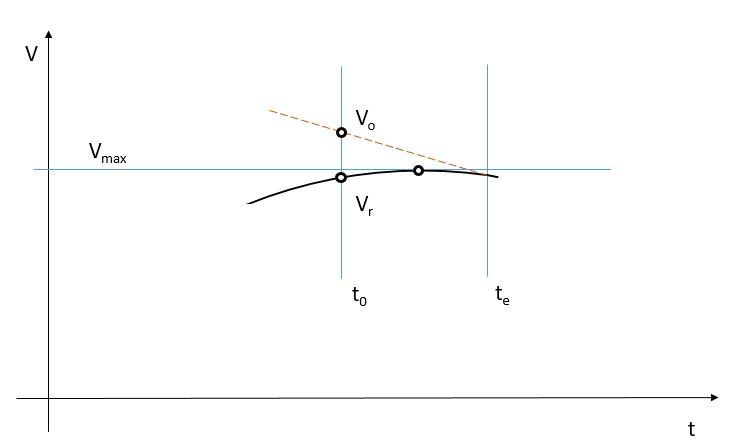
The initial velocity (Vo) and real muzzle velocity (Vr) difference

During the first part of the intermediate ballistics period the real velocity of the projectile increases. It is caused by the propellant gases exiting the muzzle. For that reason the real maximum projectile velocity (Vmax) is higher than the real muzzle velocity (Vr). The external ballistics uses so-called initial velocity Vo, which is not the same as the real muzzle velocity. The initial velocity Vo is calculated via an extrapolation of the decaying part of velocity curve to the position of the muzzle (to). The difference between these two velocities is visible in the chart.

== Altering transitional ballistics ==
In addition to the process of "crowning" a barrel to ensure a clean and accurate exit of the bullet, there are a number of devices that attempt to harness the muzzle blast for various reasons.

=== Suppressing the blast ===
Flash suppressors and sound suppressors are the most obvious devices that operate in the transitional ballistics realm. These both alter the flow of the escaping gas to reduce the effects of the muzzle blast. Flash suppressors introduce turbulence into the mixing of fuel-laden hot gases escaping from the muzzle and the surrounding oxygen-rich air, reducing combustion efficiency and thus reducing the size and brightness of the flash. Sound suppressors slow the expansion of gases, allowing it to cool and reducing the rate at which it escapes to prevent a shockwave from forming.

A recoil compensator is designed to direct the gases upwards at roughly a right angle to the bore, in essence making it a small rocket that pushes the muzzle downwards, and counters the "flip", or rise of the muzzle caused by the high bore line of most firearms. These are often found on "raceguns" used for action shooting and in heavy, rifle caliber handguns used in metallic silhouette shooting. In the former case, the compensator serves to keep the sights down on target for a quick follow-up shot, while in the latter case they keep the heavy recoil directed backwards, preventing the pistol from trying to twist out of the shooter's grip.

A muzzle brake is designed to redirect the muzzle blast backwards, and therefore counter the recoil of the bullet. Muzzle brakes tend to be found on larger firearms, such as magnum rifles and artillery. A well designed muzzle brake can significantly reduce recoil, turning a rifle that would otherwise be punishing to shoot into a far more tolerable experience. A good example may be seen on the M82 Barrett sniper rifle.

There are downsides to both recoil compensators and muzzle brakes. They direct more of the muzzle flash to the sides or back towards the shooter—this is especially true of muzzle brakes. While eye and ear protection should always be used when shooting, this is even more essential with the muzzle blast directed back towards the shooter. Brakes and compensators are often quite bulky, adding length, diameter, and mass to the muzzle end of the firearm where it will affect the firearm's handling worst. While a simple slot milled in the barrel, such as those used in Magna-Porting, will provide some benefit, efficient redirection of the gas flow requires large ports and baffles to deflect as much gas as possible. It is also highly inadvisable to fire sabot rounds like shotgun slugs or APDS rounds through a muzzle brake not designed for them.
