= IMR Legendary Powders =

- Industry: Firearms
- Predecessor: E.I. DuPont
- Founded: 1892, Carney, New Jersey, United States
- Founder: E.I. DuPont
- Area served: World Wide
- Owner: Hodgdon, Shawnee, Kansas, United States
- Website: http://www.imrpowder.com/

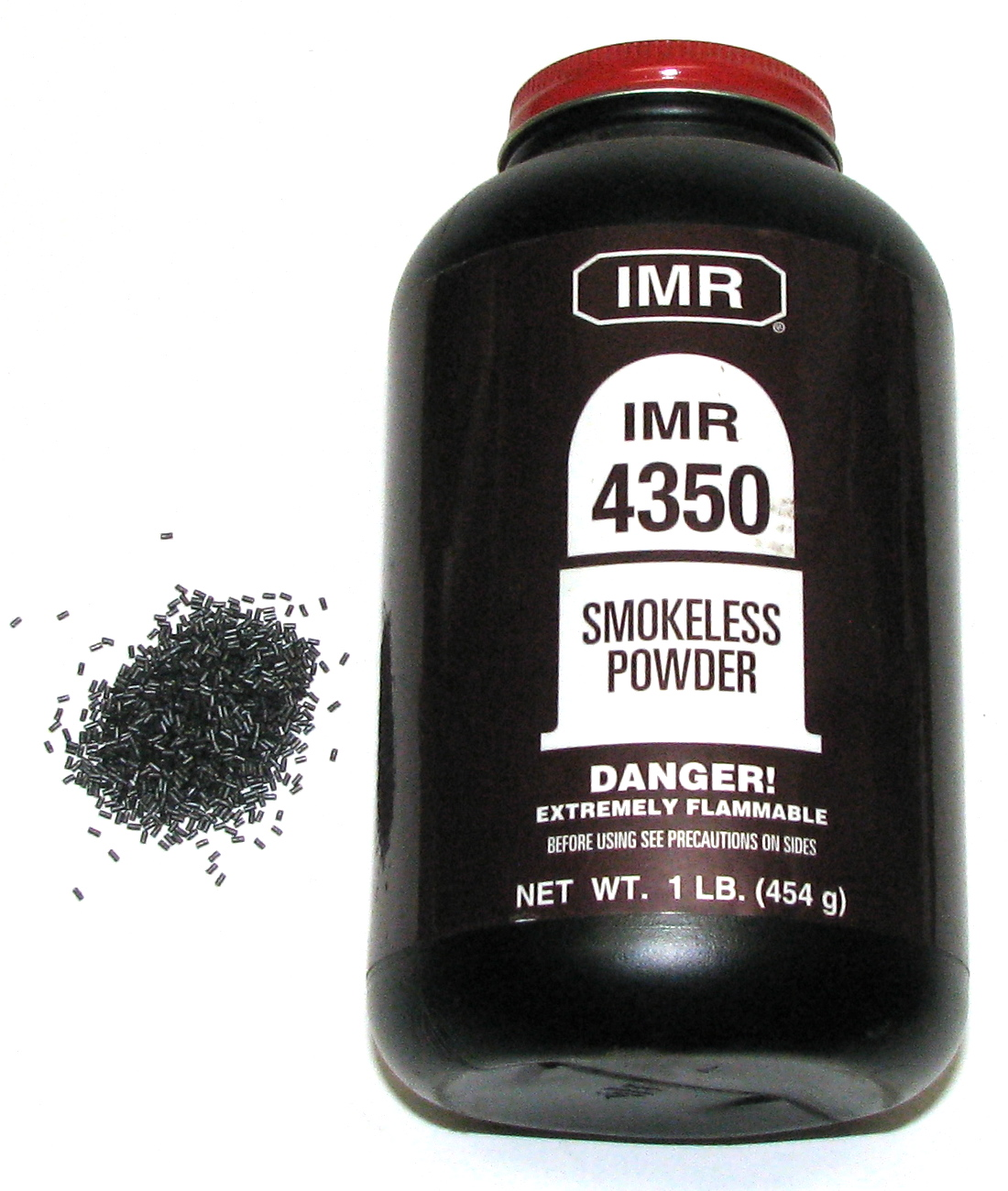
An IMR smokeless powder for reloading

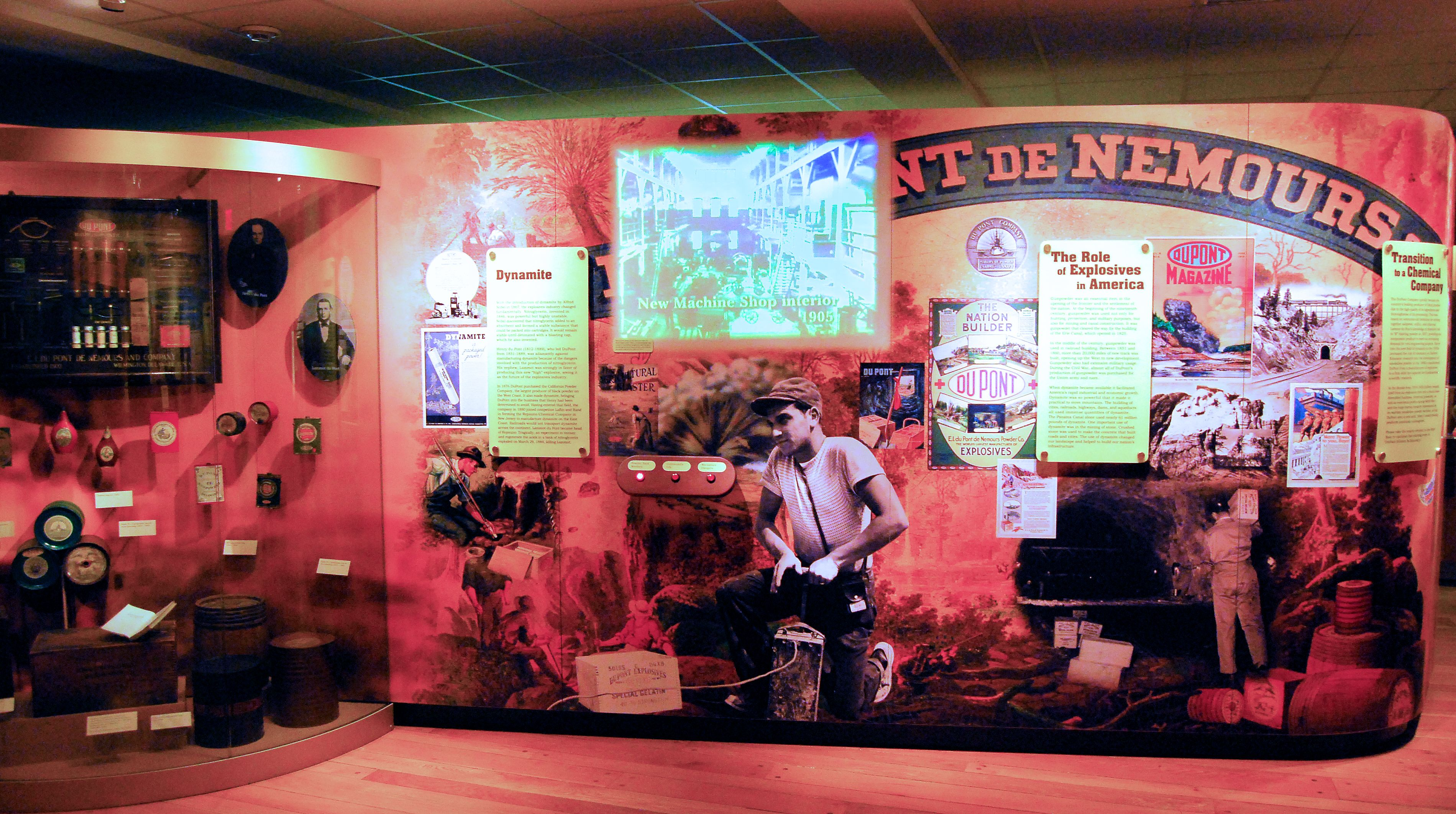
The Hagley Museum in Wilmington, Delaware

IMR Legendary Powders is a line of smokeless powders which are popularly used in sporting and military/police firearm cartridges. The initials 'IMR' stand for Improved Military Rifle powder. IMR powders makes a line of various types of smokeless powder suitable for loading many cartridges for rifles, handguns, and shotguns.

== History ==
=== First powder plant ===
The French Revolution caused E.I. DuPont de Nemours and Company to migrate to the United States in 1802. He built a factory to produce gunpowder near the site of Eleutherian Mills in Newark, Delaware. Today that site has been repurposed as the Hagley Museum and Library. DuPont's first product at the site was blackpowder. DuPont powders were instrumental in helping to build the infrastructure of nations worldwide. They were vital to the mining and construction industries until replaced by more modern explosives. DuPont became a major producer of Dynamite and eventually developed many other products lines.

The line of improved military rifle powder came into existence in the 1920s. It consisted of nitrocellulose, dinitrotoluene (DNT), graphite, and a small amount (0.6%) of diphenylamine (stabilizer). Potassium sulfate is added to decrease the amount of muzzle flash. Cartridges loaded with this powder include .30-06 Springfield and 7.92×57mm Mauser.

=== Plant expansion ===
DuPont began production of the IMR line of smokeless powders across the river from the Wilmington Plant at Carney's Point, New Jersey, in 1892. The first powders were called "MR" for military rifle powder. In the 1920s these powders were improved and the name was changed to IMR. Various different powder are produced and are given numbers to distinguish them. The different types of powder typically have different burning rates. Due to the construction of metallic cartridges, different amounts of powder of different burning speeds are used to obtain optimum performance and accuracy.

Due to the increased demand for these powders, which resulted from World War I, an additional plant was constructed in Valleyfield, Canada, which remains the primary source of IMR powders today. During World War II up to 1,000,000 pounds of powder was being shipped per day.

== Product detail ==
DuPont released their first handloading guide in the 1950s which was aimed at reloading of shot shell. IMR Legendary Powders includes powder lines for rifle, handgun, and shotgun reloading.

=== IMR Legendary Powders ===
- Rifle powders
  - 3031
  - 4007 SSC
  - 4064
  - 4166
  - 4198
  - 4227
  - 4320
  - 4350
  - 4831
  - 4895
  - 7828
  - 8208 XBR
- Handgun powders
  - PB
  - SR-7625
  - SR-4756
  - SR-4759
  - Trail Boss
- Shotgun powders
  - 700-X
  - 800-X
  - Blue
  - Green
  - Red
  - Target
  - Unequal

== Current ownership ==
In 2003 the Hodgdon Powder Company purchased IMR powders.

IMR powders (not all inclusive)
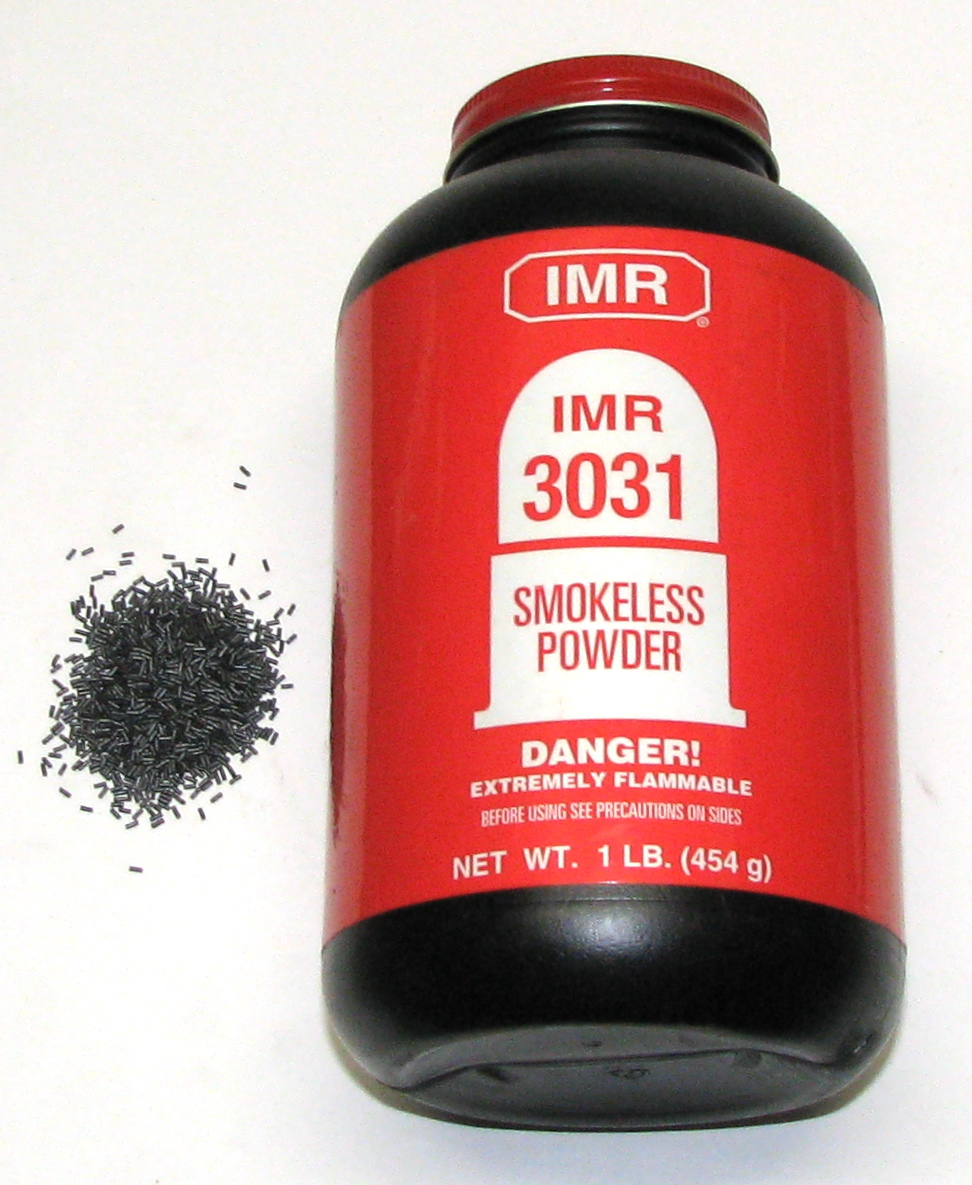
3031

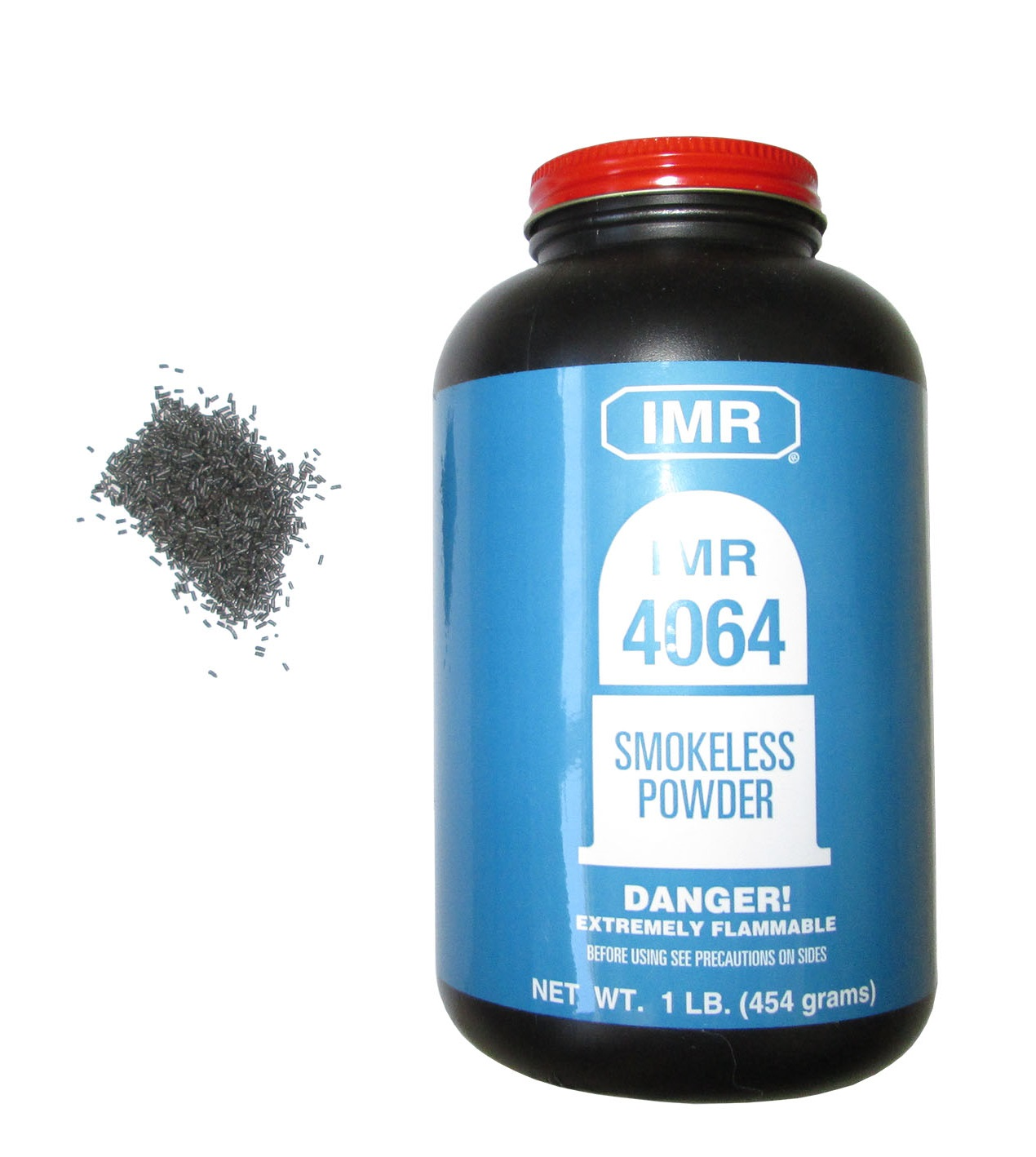
4064

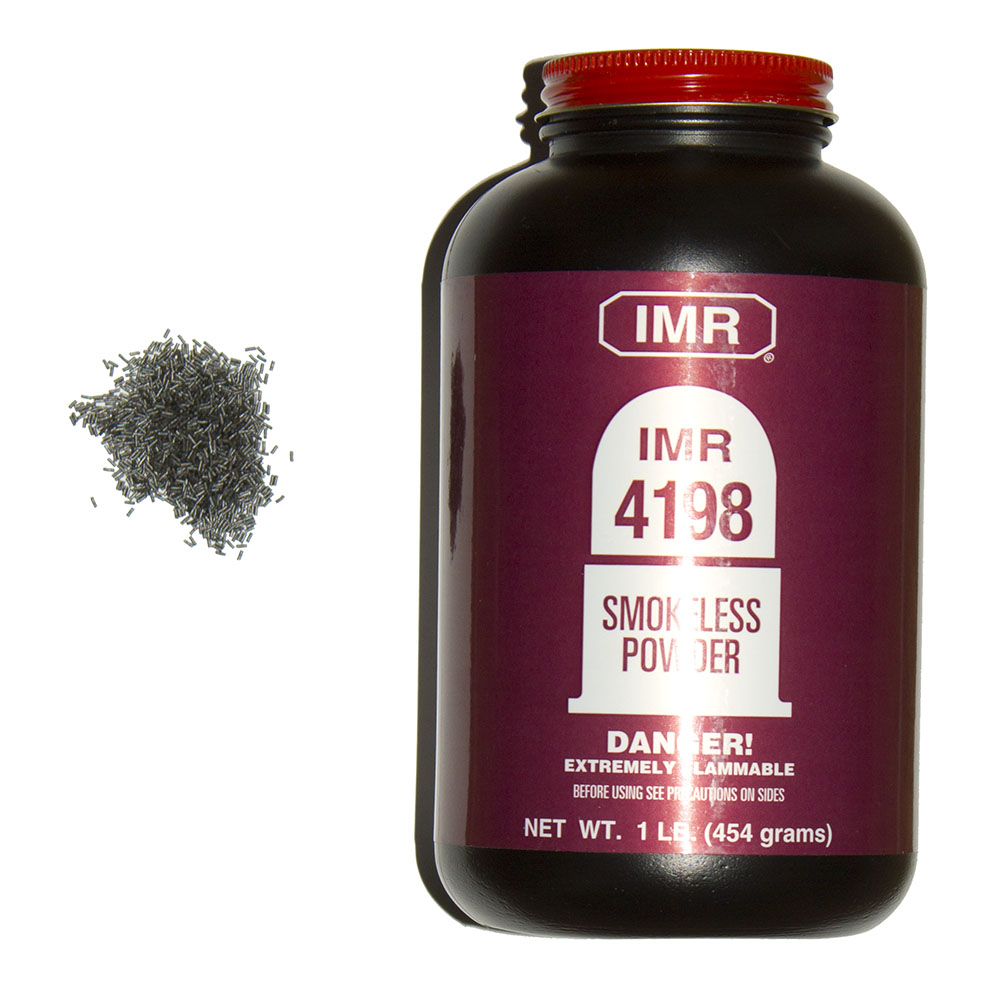
4198

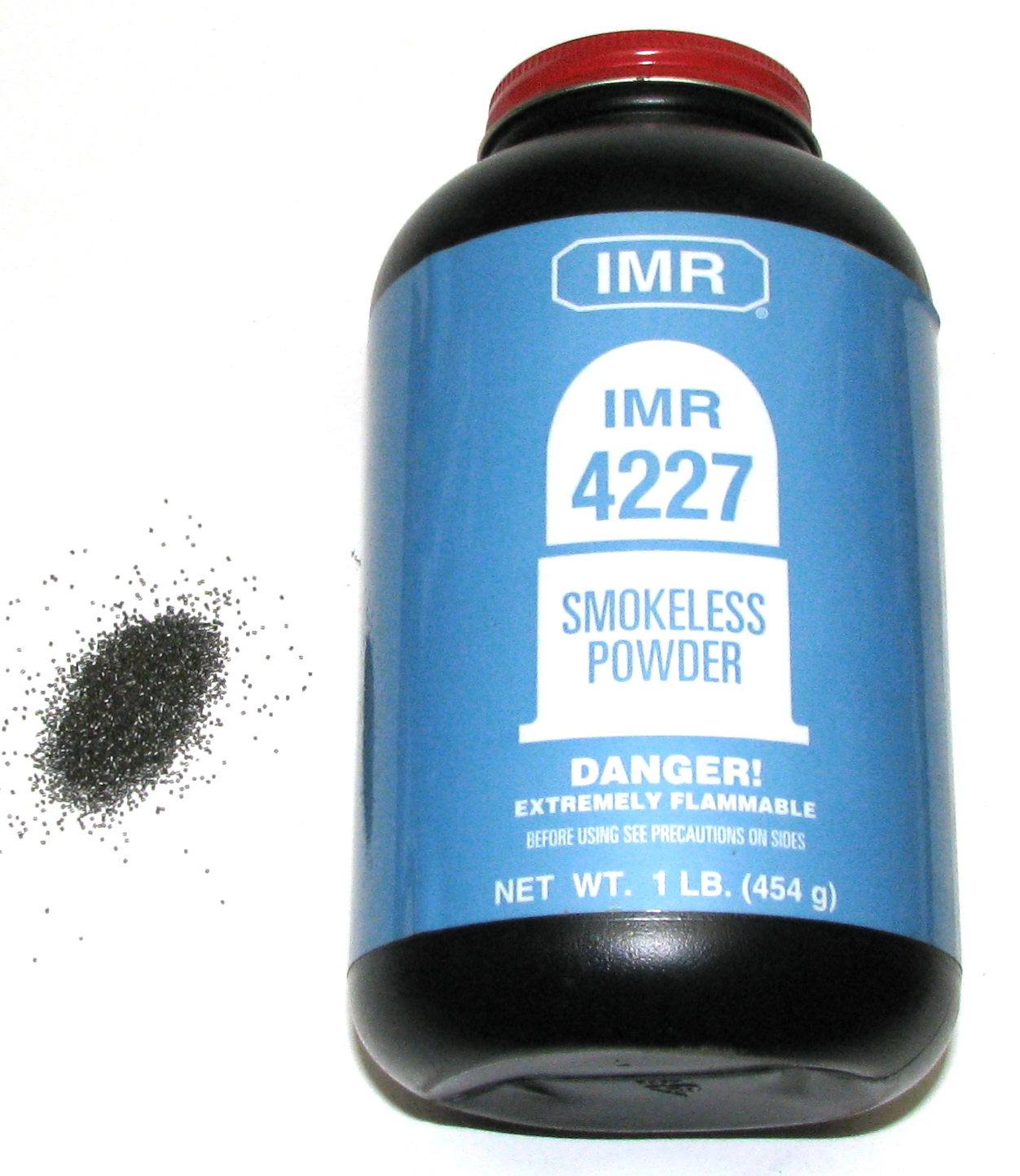
4227

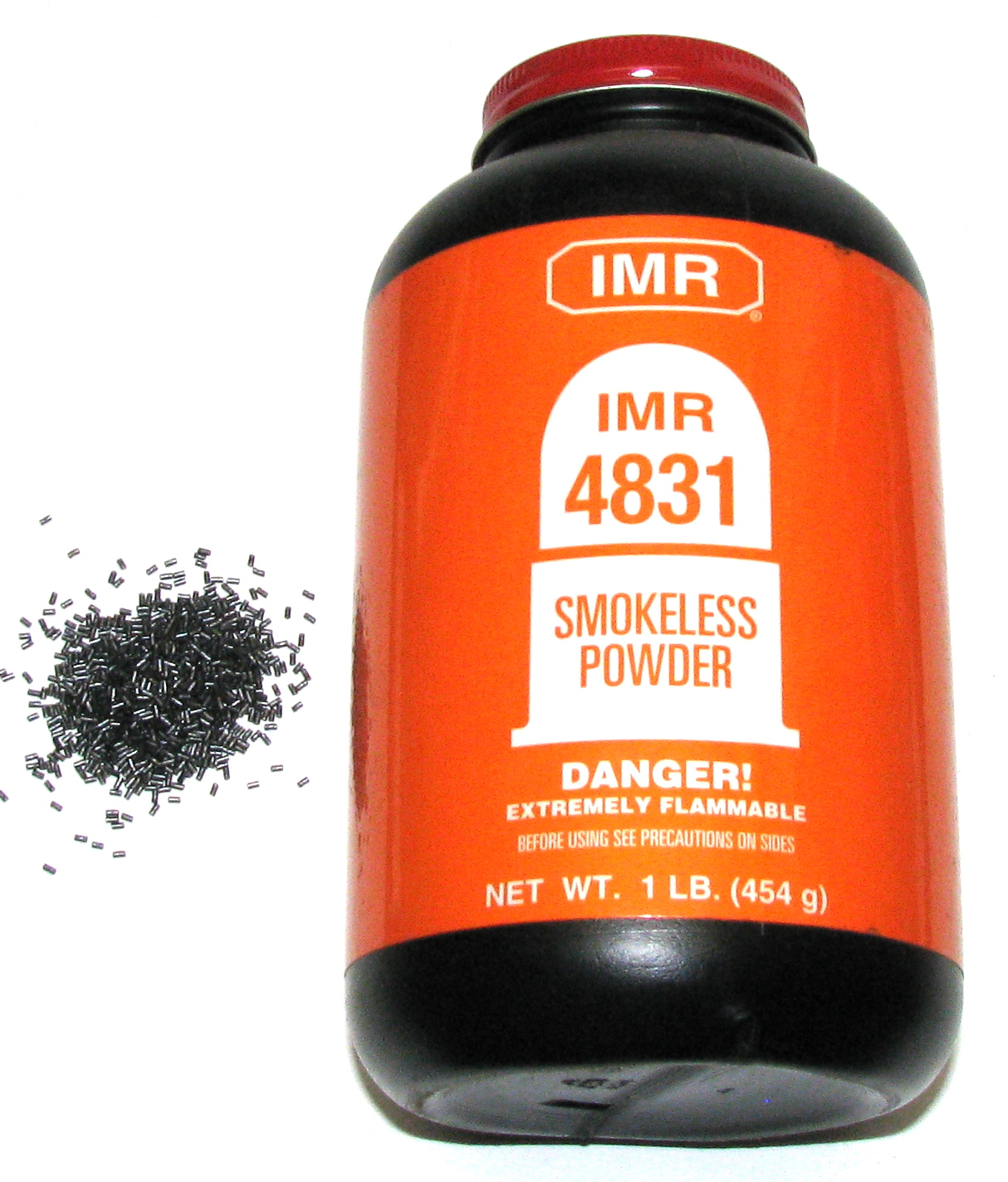
4831

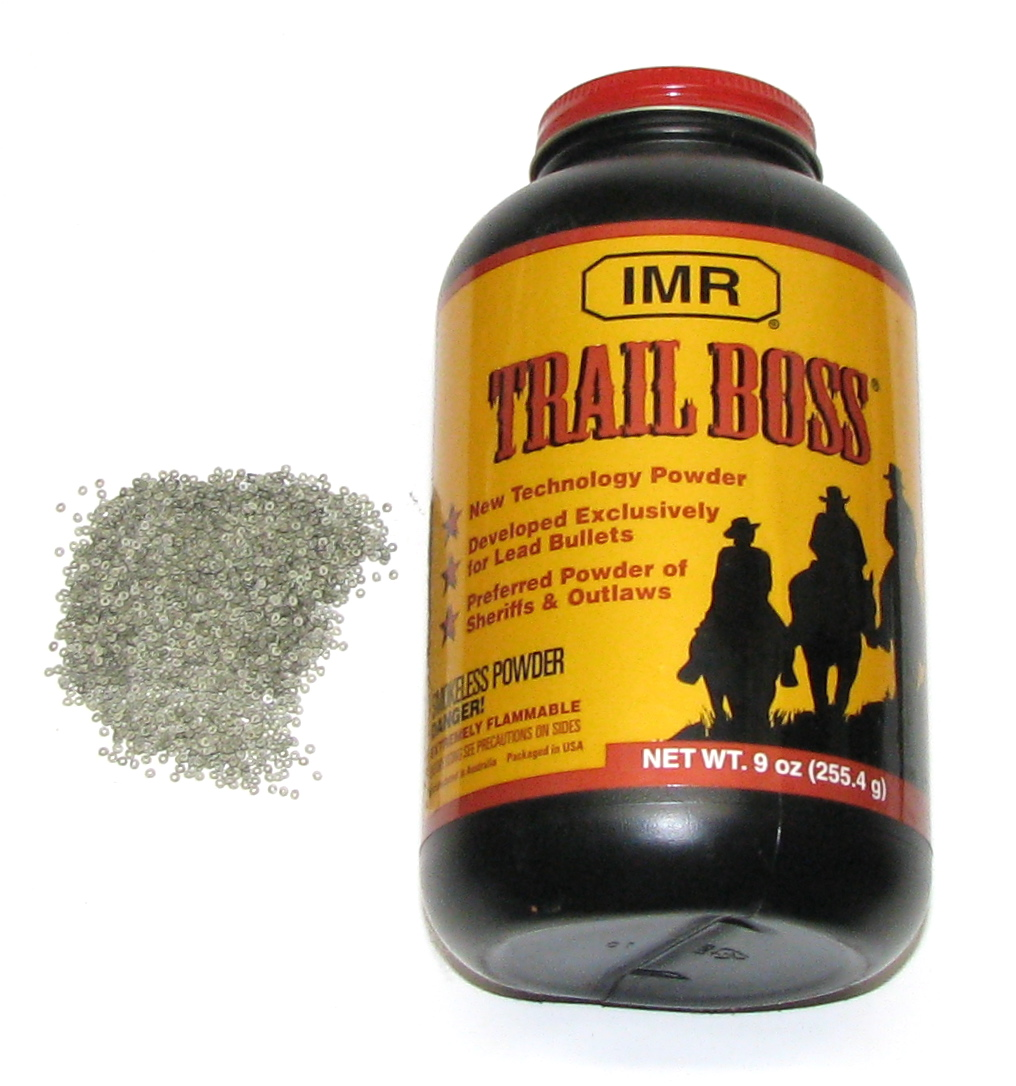
TrailBoss
