= W231 =

Firearm propellant

W231 is a smokeless powder manufactured by General Dynamics at the St. Marks plant in Florida. It is packaged, distributed, and marketed by Hodgdon Powder Company and marketed under the Winchester trade name. Hodgdon licensed the Winchester brand in January 2006, assuming all packaging and support responsibilities. Prior to this Winchester brand powders were manufactured by the Olin Corporation.

W231 is commonly used in metallic cartridge reloading and handloading. It is used primarily for pistol cartridges. While the product label states "ball" powder, W231 is a flattened-ball powder.
