= Rock Chuck Bullet Swage =

American ammunition handloading equipment manufacturer, based in Oroville, California

Rock Chuck Bullet Swage (later abbreviated RCBS) is a handloading equipment manufacturer operating in Oroville, California. The company originated during the sporting ammunition shortage caused by World War II, became a widely recognized manufacturer of handloading equipment, and has subsequently been purchased by Hodgdon Powder Company. The name came from the rock chuck variety of varmint found in the Oroville foothills.

== History ==
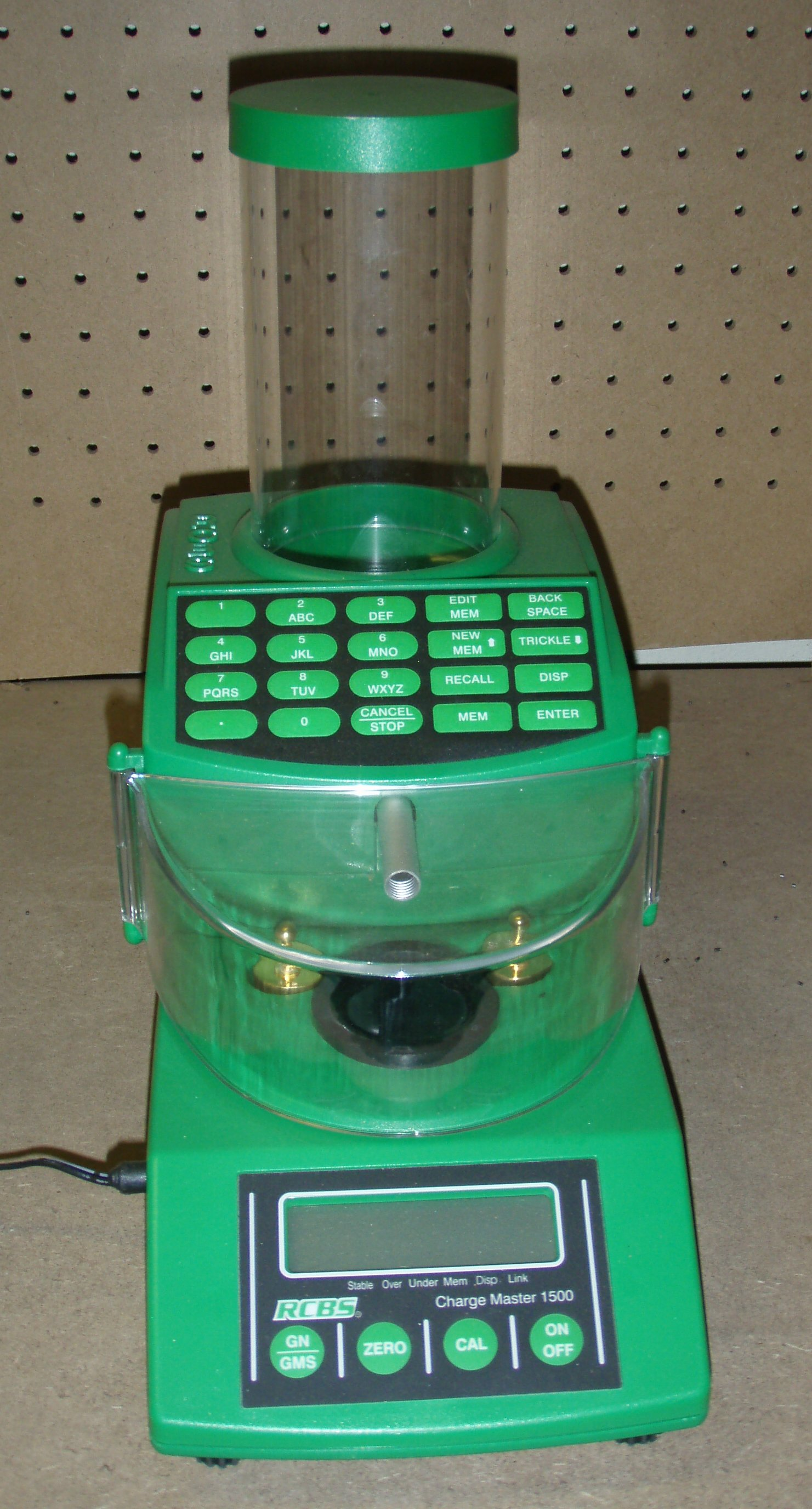
This powder dispenser is an example of the wide variety of handloading equipment manufactured by RCBS.

As U.S. factories prioritized military ammunition production during the Second World War, hunting ammunition became scarce. In 1943 Fred Huntington was unable to find suitable varmint hunting ammunition for shooting rock chucks. Working in the boiler room of his father's Oroville laundromat, Huntington devised a swaging machine converting spent .22 rim-fire cartridge cases into jackets for soft-point bullets. Huntington's swaging dies became popular after the war as returning soldiers used their firearm skills for hunting. Huntington opened a small machine shop in Oroville in 1948. A larger building was required by 1954, and the factory had grown to 7,500 ft^{2} (700 m^{2}) by 1958.

The Oroville factory expanded to 50,000 ft^{2} (4,600 m^{2}) with over 150 employees producing bullet casting equipment, powder measures, and reloading presses with dies for removing spent primers and resizing fired centerfire ammunition cartridge cases before seating new primers and bullets. RCBS became part of the Sporting Equipment Division of Omark Industries in 1976. Omark published the RCBS Cast Bullet Manual in 1986. Blount sold RCBS to Alliant Technosystems in 2001, which spun off RCBS as part of Vista Outdoor in 2015. Hodgdon Powder Company purchased RCBS in 2024.
