= Lee Precision =

Lee Precision is a handloading equipment manufacturer operating in Hartford, Wisconsin. In 1958 Richard (“Dick”) Lee invented the Lee Loader for shotgun shells in his home workshop in Wisconsin, creating Lee Custom Engineering (the firm’s original name).

Many shooters regard the inexpensive Lee presses and dies as inferior compared with those from Dillon, RCBS, or Hornady. Their reloading equipment is the cheapest on the market.
