= Decoppering =

Removing copper (usually from a weapon barrel)

Decoppering is the act of removing copper and it is most commonly used in the context of the removal of copper residues from the rifling of gun barrels.

Decoppering agents are frequently added to smokeless powder propellants. Decoppering is most important for large guns (especially naval guns), but the additives are used even in medium and small caliber guns.

The most common decoppering additives are:

- Tin metal and compounds, e.g. tin dioxide
- Bismuth metal and compounds, e.g. bismuth trioxide, bismuth subcarbonate, bismuth nitrate, bismuth antimonide; the bismuth compounds are favored as copper dissolves in molten bismuth, forming brittle and easily removable alloy
- Lead foil and lead compounds, although concerns have been raised about lead toxicity
