= Ball propellant =

Form of nitrocellulose used in small arms cartridges

This magnified image of H110 illustrates propellant spheres passed between rollers to produce a uniform minimum dimension.

Ball propellant (trademarked as Ball Powder by Olin Corporation and marketed as spherical powder by Hodgdon Powder Company) is a form of nitrocellulose used in small arms cartridges. Ball propellant can be manufactured more rapidly with greater safety and less expense than extruded propellants.

Ball propellant was first used to load military small arms cartridges during World War II and has been manufactured for sale to handloading civilians since 1960.

== History ==
The United States military replaced black powder during the first decade of the 20th century with smokeless powders formulated from nitrocellulose colloided with ether and alcohol. Large quantities were manufactured for World War I and significant amounts remained unused after the war. Nitrocellulose deteriorates in storage, but military quantities of old smokeless propellant were sometimes reworked into new lots of propellants.

Through the 1920s Dr. Fred Olsen worked at Picatinny Arsenal experimenting with ways to salvage tons of cannon powder manufactured for World War I. Olsen was employed by Western Cartridge Company in 1929 and developed a process for manufacturing ball propellant by 1933. Reworked powder was dissolved in ethyl acetate containing small quantities of desired stabilizers and other additives. The resultant syrupy fluid, combined with water and surfactants, is heated and agitated in a pressurized container until it forms an emulsion of small spherical globules of the desired size. Ethyl acetate distills off as pressure is slowly reduced to leave small spheres of nitrocellulose and additives. The spheres can be subsequently modified by adding nitroglycerin to increase energy, flattening between rollers to a uniform minimum dimension, coating with deterrents to retard ignition, and/or glazing with graphite to improve flow characteristics during blending.

This manufacturing process also worked with newly manufactured nitrocellulose. Manufacturing time was reduced from approximately two weeks for extruded propellants to 40 hours for ball propellants. Rate of burning is controlled by deterrent coatings eliminating precision forming and cutting machines required for surface area control of extruded propellants. Safety was improved by performing most of the manufacturing process in water. Olin subsidiaries began manufacturing ball powder specification WC846 for .303 British ammunition during World War II. Hodgdon Powder Company salvaged 80 tons of WC846 propellant from disassembled .303 British military rifle cartridges in 1949 and sold the propellant to handloading civilians as BL type C. The C was to indicate the propellant burned "cooler" than traditional Improved Military Rifle propellants. Olin continued manufacturing WC846 for both civilian ammunition and 7.62×51mm NATO cartridges after the war. Manufacturing operations moved in 1969 from East Alton, Illinois, to the St. Marks Powder plant in Crawfordville, Florida.

== Composition ==
Olin's safety data sheet indicates the following composition of ball propellant:

- 40 to 70 percent nitrocellulose
- 10 to 60 percent nitroglycerin
- 3 to 7 percent ethyl centralite
- 1 to 5 percent dibutyl phthalate
- 1 to 5 percent polyester adipate
- 1 to 5 percent rosin
- 1 percent diphenylamine
- 1 percent ethyl acetate
- 1 percent potassium nitrate
- 1 percent potassium sulfate
- less than 1 percent graphite
- less than 1 percent N-Nitrosodiphenylamine

== Comparison with extruded (stick) propellants ==
Aside from the manufacturing advantages, ball propellants metered more uniformly through powder measures used to load cartridges, had a longer storage life in loaded cartridges, and reduced erosion of rifle barrels when those cartridges were fired. On the other hand, ball propellant loadings were more difficult to ignite, produced brighter muzzle flash, and left heavier fouling in rifle barrels than had been common with extruded propellants. Some ball propellants burned satisfactorily over a narrower pressure range than extruded propellants. Some handloaders accustomed to extruded propellants had difficulty determining appropriate charges for the unique components they were assembling. Light loads might fail to ignite and burn properly while heavier loads might cause abrupt pressure increases to dangerous levels.

Fouling difficulties increased as military loadings shifted from the .303 British and 7.62 NATO to the 5.56×45mm NATO. Some propellant lots clogged the gas tube of M16 rifles until concentrations of calcium carbonate stabilizers were reduced in 1970 as reformulated WC844 for the 5.56mm NATO cartridge. Civilian handloaders experienced similar fouling problems with smaller bore diameters. Some attributed the problem to residues of unburned deterrent coatings and suggested using magnum primers to improve ignition and burning at lower pressures. Ignition was ultimately improved by blending in a small percentage of uncoated propellant granules to improve the performance of standard primers.

== Expanded handloading options ==
Hodgdon's original 80 tons of surplus BL-C introduced ball propellants to handloaders. Handloaders were ready to pay for newly manufactured ball propellants when the surplus supply was exhausted about 1960.

Hodgdon

- BL-C (Lot 2) for full-charge loads in the .308 Winchester and .223 Remington was newly manufactured by Olin in 1961 with 10 percent nitroglycerin, 10 percent diphenylamine stabilizer, and 5.75 percent dibutyl phthalate deterrent, but without the flash suppressant used in the surplus military propellant.
- H110 was surplus .30 carbine powder introduced in 1962 for loading the .30 carbine and magnum revolver cartridges.
- H335 was surplus Olin WC844 for full-charge loads in the .223 Remington and .308 Winchester.
- H380 was Olin WC852 for full-charge loads in the .30-06 Springfield.
- H414 was introduced in 1967 for full-charge loads in the .270 Winchester and .30-06 Springfield
- H450 was for large capacity and magnum rifle cartridges.
- H870 was surplus M61 Vulcan propellant introduced in 1959 for loading very large capacity magnum cartridges with bore diameter of 0.3 inches (7.6 mm) or less.
- HS5 was introduced in 1963 with 13.5 percent nitroglycerin for shotgun field loads.
- HS6 was introduced in 1963 with 18 percent nitroglycerin for heavy shotgun loads.
- HS7 was introduced in 1973 with 18 percent nitroglycerine for magnum shotgun loads.
- Trap 100 was introduced in 1973 with 13.5 percent nitroglycerin for shotgun target loads.
- HP38 was introduced in 1975 (similar to Olin 230) for target loads in handguns.

Olin

- 230P Pistol propellant with 40 percent nitroglycerin introduced in 1960 and replaced by 230 in 1973 for handgun target loads.
- 231 reformulated 230 with 22.5 percent nitroglycerine and no deterrent coating so grain size and shape could be changed to minimize bridging in loading machines.
- 295P Pistol propellant introduced and discontinued in early 1960s.
- 296 reformulated 295P introduced in 1973 with 10 percent nitroglycerin for magnum revolver loads.
- 450SL Shotgun Loading propellant introduced in 1960 and discontinued in 1972.
- 452AA replaced 450SL and AA12S in 1973.
- 473AA replaced 500HS and AA20S in 1973.
- 500HS High-velocity Shotgun propellant introduced in 1960 and discontinued in 1972.
- 540MS Magnum Shotgun propellant introduced in 1960 and replaced by 540 in 1973.
- 571 magnum shotgun propellant introduced in 1973.
- 630P Pistol propellant introduced in 1968 and replaced in 1973 by 630 with 35 percent nitroglycerin and no deterrent coating for magnum revolver loads.
- 680BR Ball Rifle propellant introduced in 1968 and replaced by 680 in 1973 for .22 Hornet, .218 Bee and .256 Winchester Magnum.
- 748BR Ball Rifle propellant introduced in 1968 and replaced by 748 in 1973.
- 760BR Ball Rifle propellant (similar to H414) introduced in 1968 and replaced by 760 in 1973.
- 780BR Ball Rifle propellant introduced in 1968 and discontinued in 1972.
- 785 (similar to H450) introduced in 1973 for the .243 Winchester.
- AA12S introduced in 1968 for standard 12 gauge shotgun loads and discontinued in 1972.
- AA20S introduced in 1968 for standard 20 gauge shotgun loads and discontinued in 1972.
