= Powder measure =

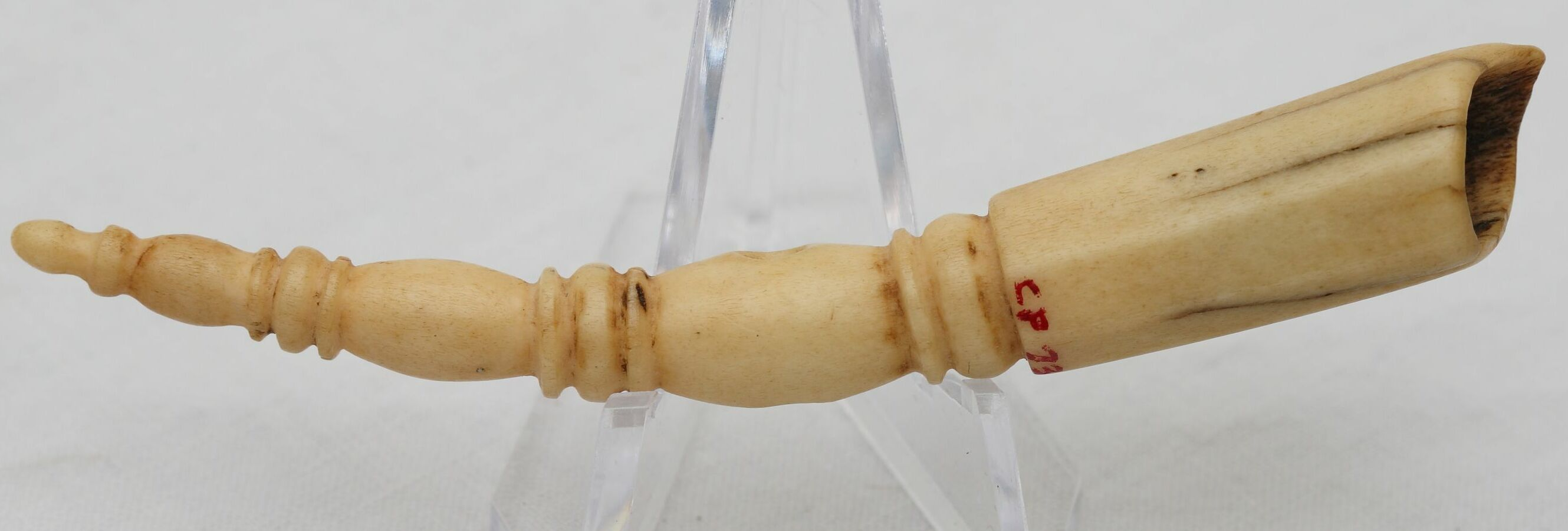
Ivory powder measure used to provide a uniform amount of gunpowder for a muzzle-loading firearm before cartridges were available

A powder measure is a device for dispensing consistent amounts of smokeless powder or black powder as charges for handloading cartridges used as small arms ammunition.

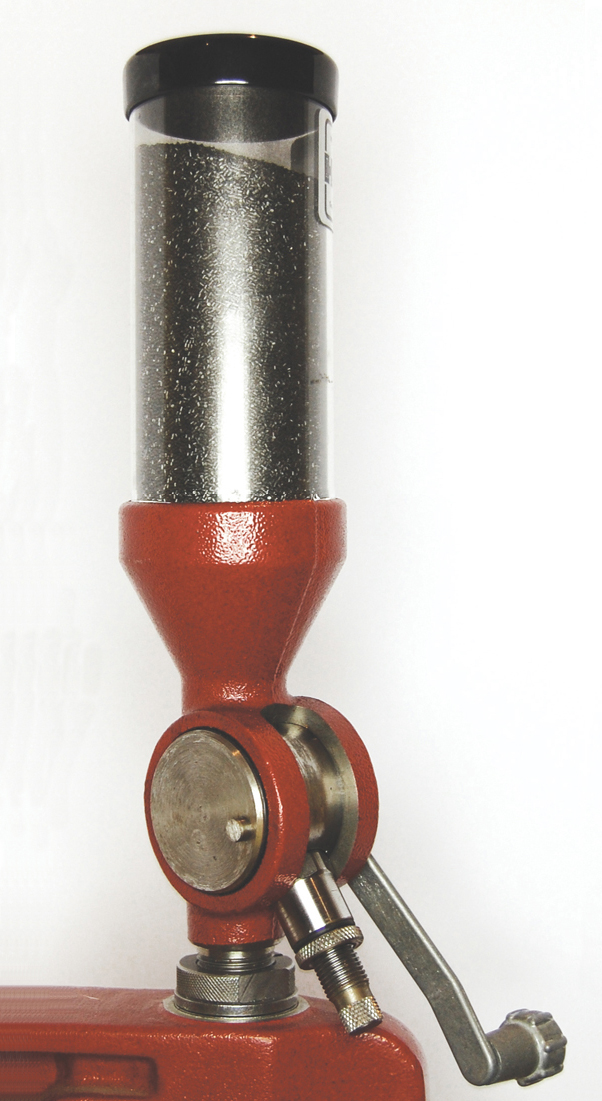
a typical volumetric powder measure

== Propellant evolution ==
Firearms using gunpowder could be loaded using a small scoop or charge cup to determine the correct amount for each shot. Some early smokeless propellants called bulk propellants were designed for a similar volume and reaction rate as gunpowder, but most modern smokeless powders have improved efficiency offering more energy from smaller charges. This improved efficiency allows smaller cartridges for increased ammunition capacity. Modern smokeless propellants come in a wide variety of shapes, density, reaction rates, and energy to weight relationships. Similar volumes of different smokeless propellants may produce dangerously different pressures in the same cartridge.

== Dispenser design ==
Adjustable powder measures became available in the 1880s. One of the earliest was designed by John M. Barlow for the Ideal Manufacturing Company of Connecticut. These powder measures typically use gravity feed from a hopper of powder above an adjustable cavity in a rotating cylinder. A lever rotates the cylinder so the cavity moves between an upward position where powder can drain from the hopper into the cavity, and a lower position where the powder can drain from the cavity into an empty cartridge case.

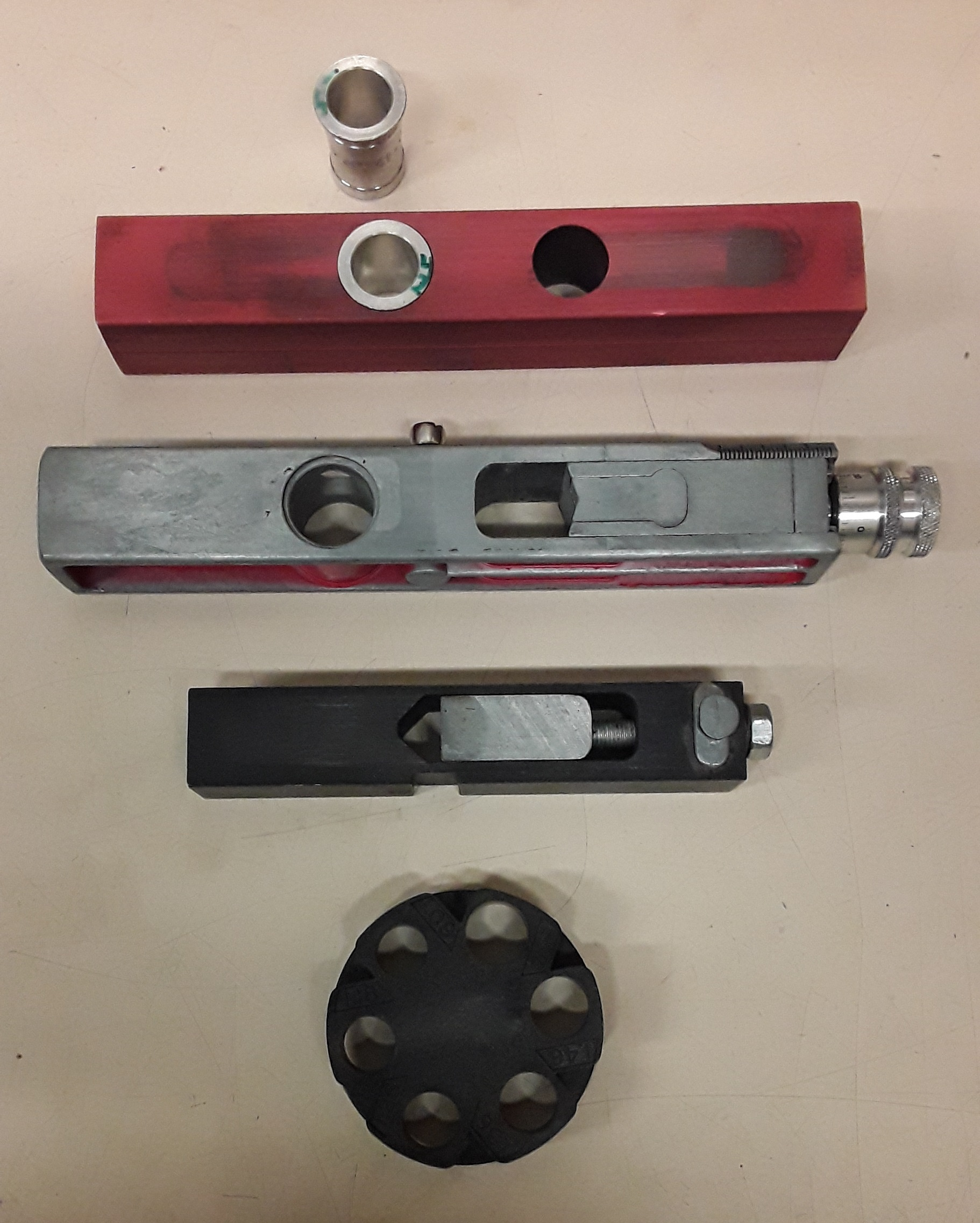
Top: Powder bushing 2nd: MEC charge bar 3rd: Universal charge bar 4th: Dillon charge bar Bottom: Lee AutoDisc

A newer type from the above rotor type uses a sliding "charge bar" that can have either changeable powder bushings or a method of adjusting the size of the powder cavity.

== Dispenser operation ==
Modern smokeless propellant charges are specified by weight rather than volume, so the correct adjustment of the charge cavity is determined by weighing the charge dispensed by that adjustment. Some weight variation may be detected in sequential charges dispensed from the same volumetric adjustment.

Bridging or compaction of granular propellants may cause these volumetric dispensers to produce dissimilar charges. Uniformity is enhanced by maintaining a similar level of propellant in the feeding hopper and by avoiding non-uniform vibrations while dispensing charges. Powder measures may dispense more uniform charges of ball propellants than cylindrical extruded Improved Military Rifle propellants.

== Bibliography ==
- Hatcher, Julian S.; Barr, Al; Neumann (1951). Handloading. Vol. 1. Washington, D.C.: National Rifle Association of America.
- Jones, Allan (1995). Reloading Manual (12th ed.). Lewiston, Idaho: Speer.
- Matunas, E.A. (1978). Ball Powder Loading Data. New Haven, Connecticut: Olin Corporation.
- Root, Gail (1993). Nosler Reloading Manual. Vol. 3. Bend, Oregon: Nosler.
- Sharpe, Philip B. (1953). Complete Guide to Handloading (3rd ed.). New York: Funk & Wagnalls.
