= Blue Poles =

1952 painting by Jackson Pollock

- Artist: Jackson Pollock
- Year: 1952
- Medium: Enamel and aluminum paint with glass on canvas
- Movement: Abstract expressionism
- Dimensions: 212.1 cm × 488.9 cm (83.5 in × 192.5 in)
- Location: National Gallery of Australia, Canberra

Blue Poles, also known as Number 11, 1952, is an abstract expressionist painting by the American artist Jackson Pollock. It was purchased amid controversy by the National Gallery of Australia in 1973 and today remains one of the gallery's major paintings.

== Title ==
At the time of the painting's creation, Pollock preferred not to assign names to his works, but rather numbers; hence, the original title of the painting was simply Number 11 or No. 11 for the year 1952. In 1954, the new title Blue Poles was first seen at an exhibition at the Sidney Janis Gallery; it reportedly originated from Pollock himself.

According to art historian Dennis Phillips, the specific rather than ambiguous title "limits our field of comprehension and does the painting a singular disservice. Because we look for the poles and miss much of the rest, the name is simply too distracting."

== History ==
=== 1955–1957: Fred Olsen ===
Fred and Florence Olsen were the original purchasers of Blue Poles from Jackson Pollock when they purchased it for $8,000, the highest price paid for a Pollock at that time. It hung in their New York apartment.

=== 1957–1973: New York art collector Ben Heller ===
Renowned art collector and abstract expressionism supporter Ben Heller acquired the painting in 1957, a year after Jackson Pollock died, for a reported $32,000. Heller was friends with Pollock and patronized him and many other American artists during his lifetime.

Blue Poles hung in the living room of Heller's 10th floor New York apartment on Central Park West. During this time he frequently had guests view the art and loaned it to various museums for additional viewing. The painting was so large that it required the removal of apartment windows to lower it onto the street below, a feat accomplished with the support of the "Seven Santini Brothers" moving team. The Heller family had a special relationship with the artwork and it was difficult to see it go.

According to Heller's daughter, "He was very involved with this art movement from its early years, and there was a struggle among these American artists to gain recognition. Even in America, the European painters were getting all the attention and prestige. So, he worked very hard with the dealers and the painters and the museums to try to establish Abstract Expressionism as an important movement. It was very, very important to him that these major works land in major museums." This desire to have the work shared was one of the contributing factors to the sale of Blue Poles to the National Gallery of Australia in 1973.

=== 1973: National Gallery of Australia purchase ===
The National Gallery of Australia (NGA) purchased Blue Poles in 1973 for A$1.3 million, then US$2 million. The gallery's director at the time, James Mollison, was not able to authorise purchases over $1 million, so the acquisition was approved by Prime Minister Gough Whitlam, who decided that the price should be made public.

The purchase elicited a great deal of public discussion; according to art historian Patrick McCaughey, "never had such a picture moved and disturbed the Australian public". The debate centred on the painting's record selling price, at the time a world record for a contemporary American painting, as well as the perceived financial ineptitude of Whitlam's Labor Party government and debate over the relative value of abstract art. In the conservative climate of the time, the purchase created a political and media scandal.

=== 1998–1999: Museum of Modern Art retrospective ===
In 1998, Blue Poles left Australia for the first time since its purchase for inclusion in a Pollock retrospective at the Museum of Modern Art in New York which ran from 1 November 1998 to 2 February 1999. The painting was the signature work of the exhibition, and as described in a review, it "dominated" the last gallery of the show, ending it "not with a whimper, but a bang".

=== 2016–2017: Royal Academy of Arts Abstract Expressionism exhibition ===
While rarely loaned, the work was displayed as part of the Royal Academy's Abstract Expressionism exhibition from 24 September 2016 to 2 January 2017 in London, before returning to the NGA and being rehung in level 3.

=== 2020 conservation project ===
As a result of the gallery's temporary closure due to the COVID-19 pandemic, it became possible to undertake an extensive conservation project of Blue Poles, a work that has rarely been off display since its purchase in 1973.

== Legacy ==
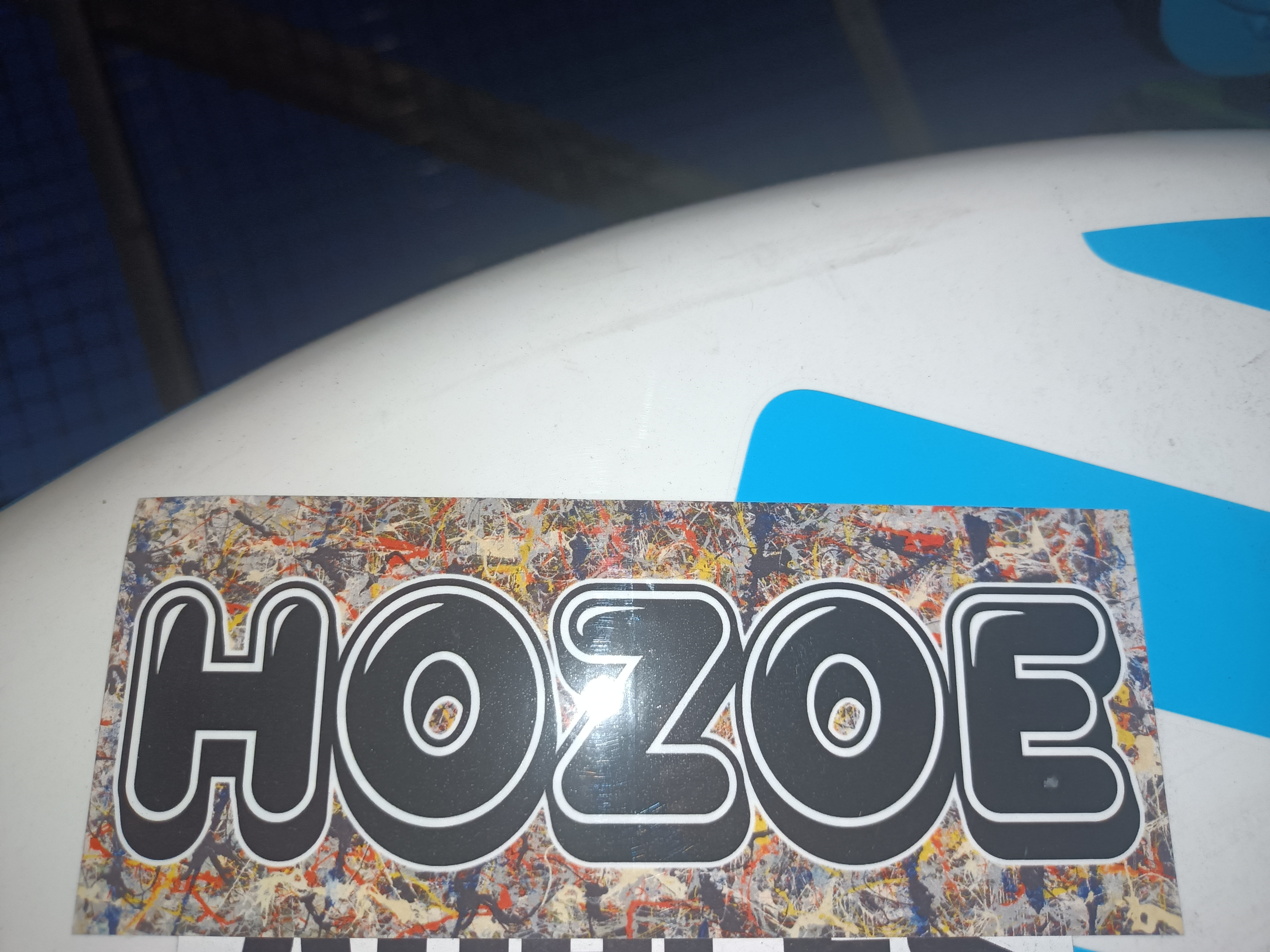
"Blue Poles" on sticker art in Sydney. 2025

The painting has become one of the most popular exhibits in the gallery, for both its value as a major work of 1950s abstract expressionism, and its significance in Australian politics and history. Estimates of the painting's present value vary widely, from $100 million to $350 million, but its increased value has at least shown it to have been a worthwhile purchase from a financial point of view.
