= Fred Huntington =

Entrepreneur and cartridge wildcatter

- Born: December 12, 1912
- Died: August 10, 1998 (aged 85)
- Occupation: Entrepreneur; Cartridge wildcatter
- Known for: Founder of RCBS

Fred Huntington (December 12, 1912 – August 10, 1998) was an entrepreneur and cartridge wildcatter involved in the shooting industry. Huntington founded RCBS which is today one of the leading manufacturers of cartridge handloading equipment. He also developed the .243 Rock Chucker cartridge which lead to the development of the .244 Remington (later renamed 6mm Remington).
