= Ben Heller (art collector) =

American art collector (1925–2019)

Ben Heller (1925 – April 24, 2019) was an American real estate magnate, textile mogul, and art collector primarily of Abstract Expressionist who is most noted for having been the party who sold Jackson Pollock's 1952 mixed-media painting Blue Poles to the Australian government, which set a new record for the highest price ever paid for an American painting at that juncture ($1.3 million US).

Heller and his first wife, Judith Ann Goldhill Heller (died 1970), were early patrons of Jackson Pollock, Barnett Newman, and Franz Kline and in addition had works by Robert Motherwell, Arshile Gorky, Willem de Kooning, Ad Reinhardt, and Clyfford Still in their collection.

Heller exhibited the crux of his art collection in his tenth-floor apartment on Central Park West on Manhattan's Upper West Side. Often when the large pieces (including Blue Poles) were moved in or out the apartment, be it for acquisition, museum loan, or sale, they had to be extracted from or introduced into the abode through the front windows, requiring the use of a crane.

== Book ==
Heller is the author of the volume Towards a New Abstraction which served as the main catalogue essay for the 1963 exhibition of the same name mounted at the Jewish Museum in Manhattan, which published the tome.
