= Fred Olsen =

British-born American art collector and chemist (1891–1986)

Fredrich Olsen
- Born: 28 February 1891; Newcastle upon Tyne
- Died: 2 November 1986 (aged 95); Guilford, Connecticut
- Citizenship: United States
- Education: Washington University in St. Louis (PhD)
- Known for: ball propellant
- Scientific career
- Fields: chemistry
- Workplaces: Picatinny Arsenal; Western Cartridge Company; Olin Corporation

Fredrich Olsen (1891–1986) was a British-born American chemist remembered as the inventor of ball propellant and as a donor or seller to the art antiquities collections of Yale University, the University of Illinois, and the Massachusetts Institute of Technology.

== Professional chemist ==
Olsen was born on 28 February 1891, in Newcastle upon Tyne, England. Following education in Canada, he began his professional career in 1917 as chief chemist for the Aetna Explosives Company of Gary, Indiana. When Aetna went out of business following World War I, Olsen worked at Picatinny Arsenal from 1919 to 1929 devising a remanufacturing process to preserve deteriorating military inventories of smokeless powder in artillery ammunition manufactured during World War I. He was then employed by the Western Cartridge Company of East Alton, Illinois, where he patented the Ball Powder manufacturing process in 1933. Western Cartridge Company became an Olin Corporation subsidiary in 1944, and Olsen was appointed Olin's vice president for Research and Development in 1952.

== Art antiquities ==
Olsen and his wife, the former Florence Quittenton, were collectors of Coptic art, Pre-Columbian art, African Art, Modern Art and early Chinese art. He was also the original purchaser of Jackson Pollock's "Blue Poles." Being friends with Pollock, Isamu Noguchi, Mark Rothko and other artists, Olsen bought many of their works. Following his retirement from Olin Corporation in 1956, Olsen and his wife purchased a winter home in Antigua from which they explored the ancient Arawak realm. They traveled the rivers of Suriname, Guyana and Venezuela in dugout canoes. They also found Arawak artifacts on 22 of 27 Caribbean islands they visited.

== Olsen House ==
He commissioned a house designed by Tony Smith in Guilford, Connecticut, on a pink granite outcrop above Long Island Sound, that was completed in 1953; Olsen's needs were a gallery to display his art, guest accommodations for visiting artists and their living quarters. Olsen found the house as Smith envisaged it, in some ways unlivable, but liked it enough to make it his principal home. Within a year, Olsen made modifications which devastated Smith, who built only one more house in his lifetime. Smith later devoted himself to sculpture, his main claim to fame. In 1998, the artistic couple Jeff Preiss and Rebecca Quaytman stumbled on the house when it was for sale. Threatened with destruction by a developer, a campaign by Marjorie Olsen, the collector's daughter-in-law, enabled Preiss and Quaytman to purchase the house. Terence Riley, the chief architecture and design curator at the Museum of Modern Art (MoMA) ranked the house "among the best examples of post-World War II American domestic architecture". Renovations were made to restore the sculptural clarity of Smith's vision. It is less than a mile away from another Smith house built for Fred Olsen Jr.

Olsen received an Honorary Doctorate from Heriot-Watt University in 1985.

Olsen died in Guilford, Connecticut, on 2 November 1986, leaving most of his art and artifact collection to American universities.
