= St. Marks Powder =

Ammunition manufacturer in the United States of America

St. Marks Powder, Inc.

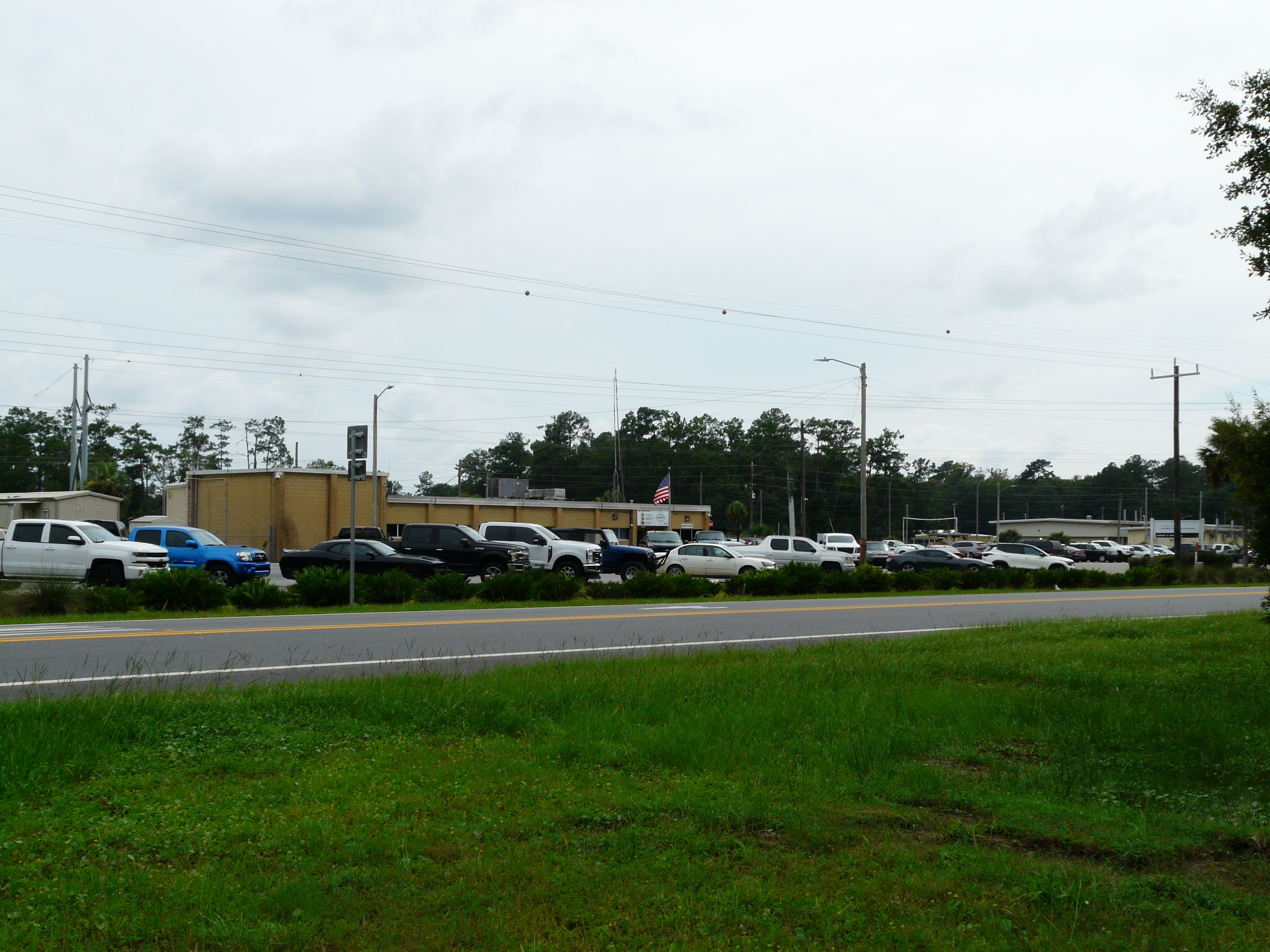
- Main plant entrance
- Industry: Manufacturer of ammunition components
- Founded: 1998
- Headquarters: 7121 Coastal Hwy, Crawfordville, Fla. 32327
- Products: ball propellants
- Parent: General Dynamics
- Website: https://www.gdots.com/wp-content/uploads/2024/01/400002982-BALL-POWDER-Propellants-4.pdf

St. Marks Powder is a subsidiary of General Dynamics Ordnance and Tactical Systems manufacturing ball propellant in Crawfordville, Florida. St. Marks makes about 15,000 tons per year, making it the world's largest producer of propellant. The company is a member of the Sporting Arms and Ammunition Manufacturers' Institute (SAAMI).

== History ==
Large-scale ball propellant manufacture began during World War II at the Olin Corporation plant in East Alton, Illinois. Population growth of the St. Louis, Missouri, metropolitan area encouraged finding a more remote location for a modern production plant. The St. Marks manufacturing facility was built in 1969 on a large plot of undeveloped swampland south of Tallahassee, Florida, at near sea-level elevation between the St. Marks River and the Gulf Coast. Plant operation was transferred to St. Marks Powder in 1998.

== Products ==
St. Marks Powder supplies nearly 100 percent of the propellant used in 5.56×45mm NATO, 7.62×51mm NATO, 9×19mm NATO, and .50 BMG ammunition for United States military small arms and 20mm ammunition for the M61 Vulcan aircraft cannon. Similar propellants are sold to commercial manufacturers of rimfire and centerfire ammunition or marketed by Alliant Powder, Winchester, and Hodgdon Powder Company for civilian handloading. Other propellants are used for military 60mm and 81mm mortar rounds, rocket-assisted projectiles, or dispersing non-lethal agents used for crowd control, marking, or area denial.
