= Bismuth antimonide =

Identifiers
CAS Number	12323-19-2
3D model (JSmol)	Interactive image
ChemSpider	11201349
ECHA InfoCard	100.204.020
PubChem CID	69145232.1.1InChI
- InChI: InChI=1S/2Bi.2Sb; Key: AEMQIQQWIVNHAU-UHFFFAOYSA-N
- SMILES: [Sb].[Sb].[Bi].[Bi]

Properties
Chemical formula	BiSb
Molar mass	330.74 g/mol
Appearance	Faint-grey to dark-grey powder
Density	8.31 g/cm^{3}
Solubility	insoluble

Structure
Crystal structure	Hexagonal, A7, SpaceGroup = R-3m, No. 166
Lattice constant	a = 4.546A, c = 11.860A

Hazards
- GHS labelling
Pictograms	(GHS07: Exclamation mark) (GHS09: Environmental hazard)
Signal word	Warning
Hazard statements	H302, H332, H411
NFPA 704 (fire diamond)	2 0 0
- Safety data sheet (SDS)
- Except where otherwise noted, data are given for materials in their standard state (at 25 °C [77 °F], 100 kPa). Infobox references

Bismuth antimonides, Bismuth-antimonys, or Bismuth-antimony alloys, (Bi_{1−x}Sb_{x}) are binary alloys of bismuth and antimony in various ratios.

Some, in particular Bi_{0.9}Sb_{0.1}, were the first experimentally-observed three-dimensional topological insulators, materials that have conducting surface states but have an insulating interior.

Various BiSb alloys also superconduct at low temperatures, are semiconductors, and are used in thermoelectric devices.

Bismuth antimonide itself (see box to right) is sometimes described as Bi_{2}Sb_{2}.

== Synthesis ==
Crystals of bismuth antimonides are synthesized by melting bismuth and antimony together under inert gas or vacuum. Zone melting is used to decrease the concentration of impurities. When synthesizing single crystals of bismuth antimonides, it is important that impurities are removed from the samples, as oxidation occurring at the impurities leads to polycrystalline growth.

== Properties ==
=== Topological insulator ===
Pure bismuth is a semimetal, containing a small band gap, which leads to it having a relatively high conductivity (7.7×10^{5} S/m at 20 °C). When the bismuth is doped with antimony, the conduction band decreases in energy and the valence band increases in energy. At an antimony concentration of 4%, the two bands intersect, forming a Dirac point (which is defined as a point where the conduction and valence bands intersect). Further increases in the concentration of antimony result in a band inversion, in which the energy of the valence band becomes greater than that of the conduction band at specific momenta. Between Sb concentrations of 7 and 22%, the bands no longer intersect, and the Bi_{1−x}Sb_{x} becomes an inverted-band insulator. It is at these higher concentrations of Sb that the band gap in the surface states vanishes, and the material thus conducts at its surface.

=== Superconductor ===
The highest temperatures at which Bi_{0.4}Sb_{0.6}, as a thin film of thicknesses 150–1350 Å, superconducts (the critical temperature T_{c}) is approximately 2 K. Single crystal Bi_{0.935}Sb_{0.065} can superconduct at slightly higher temperatures, and at 4.2 K, its critical magnetic field B_{c} (the maximum magnetic field that the superconductor can expel) of 1.6 T at 4.2 K.

=== Semiconductor ===
Electron mobility is one important parameter describing semiconductors because it describes the rate at which electrons can travel through the semiconductor. At 40 K, electron mobility ranged from 4.9×10^{5} cm^{2}/V·s at an antimony concentration of 0 to 2.4×10^{5} cm^{2}/V·s at an antimony concentration of 7.2%. This is much greater than the electron mobility of other common semiconductors like silicon, which is 1400 cm^{2}/V·s at room temperature.

Another important parameter of Bi_{1−x}Sb_{x} is the effective electron mass (EEM), a measure of the ratio of the acceleration of an electron to the force applied to an electron. The effective electron mass is 2×10^{−3} m_{e} for x = 0.11 and 9×10^{−4} m_{e} at x = 0.06. This is much less than the electron effective mass in many common semiconductors (1.09 in Si at 300 K, 0.55 in Ge, and 0.067 in GaAs). A low EEM is good for Thermophotovoltaic applications.

=== Thermoelectric ===
Bismuth antimonides are used as the n-type legs in many thermoelectric devices below room temperature. The thermoelectric efficiency, given by its figure of merit z_{T} = σS^{2}T/λ, where S is the Seebeck coefficient, λ is the thermal conductivity, and σ is the electrical conductivity, describes the ratio of the energy provided by the thermoelectric to the heat absorbed by the device. At 80 K, the figure of merit (z_{T}) for Bi_{1−x}Sb_{x} peaks at 6.5×10^{−3} K^{−1} when x = 0.15. Also, the Seebeck coefficient (the ratio of the potential difference between ends of a material to the temperature difference between the sides) at 80 K of Bi_{0.9}Sb_{0.1} is −140 μV/K, much lower than the Seebeck coefficient of pure bismuth, −50 μV/K.
