= Smokeless powder =

Type of firearm propellant

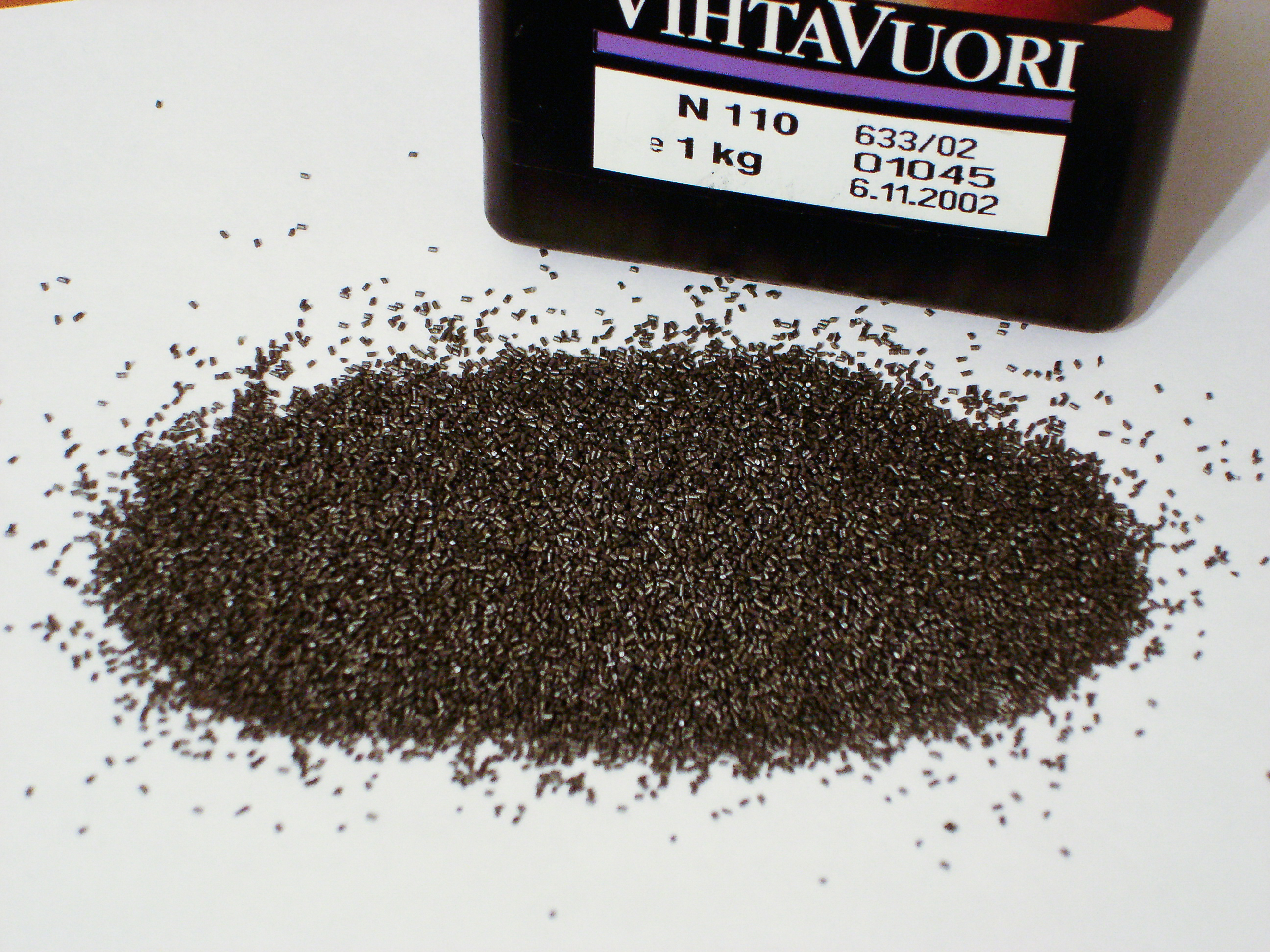
Finnish smokeless powder

Smokeless powder is a type of propellant used in firearms and artillery that produces less smoke and less fouling when fired compared to black powder. Because of their similar use, both the original black powder formulation and the smokeless propellant which replaced it are commonly described as gunpowder. The combustion products of smokeless powder are mainly gaseous, compared to around 55% solid products (mostly potassium carbonate, potassium sulfate, and potassium sulfide) for black powder. In addition, smokeless powder does not leave the thick, heavy fouling of hygroscopic material associated with black powder that causes rusting of the barrel.

Despite its name, smokeless powder is not completely free of smoke; while there may be little noticeable smoke from small-arms ammunition, smoke from artillery fire can be substantial.

Invented in 1884 by Paul Vieille, the most common formulations are based on nitrocellulose, but the term was also used to describe various picrate mixtures with nitrate, chlorate, or dichromate oxidizers during the late 19th century, before the advantages of nitrocellulose became evident.

Smokeless powders are typically classified as division 1.3 explosives under the UN Recommendations on the Transport of Dangerous Goods – Model Regulations, regional regulations (such as ADR) and national regulations. However, they are used as solid propellants; in normal use, they undergo deflagration rather than detonation.

Smokeless powder made autoloading firearms with many moving parts feasible (which would otherwise jam or seize under heavy black powder fouling). Smokeless powder allowed the development of modern semi- and fully automatic firearms and lighter breeches and barrels for artillery.

== History ==
Before the widespread introduction of smokeless powder, the use of gunpowder or black powder caused many problems on the battlefield. Military commanders since the Napoleonic Wars reported difficulty with giving orders on a battlefield obscured by the smoke of firing. Visual signals could not be seen through the thick smoke from the gunpowder used by the guns. Unless there was a strong wind, after a few shots, soldiers using gunpowder ammunition would have their view obscured by a huge cloud of smoke, and this problem became worse with increasing rate of fire. In 1884 during the Battle of Tamai Sudanese troops were able to break the square of British infantry armed with Martini–Henries because of that. Sharpshooters firing from concealed positions risked revealing their locations with a cloud of smoke.

Black powder burns in a relatively inefficient process that produces lower pressures, making it about one-third as powerful as the same amount of smokeless powder. Until the introduction of smokeless powder in the 1880s, the caliber used in military rifle cartridges tended to fall between 10.5 mm–12.5 mm with the lowest practical limit at 9.5 mm; According to author Peter Labbett, the average muzzle velocity for a 11 mm black powder rifle cartridge was approximately 430 m/s (1,400 ft/s), considerably lower in comparison to the military rifle cartridges in use in 1939, with calibers ranging from 6.5 mm–8 mm generating a muzzle velocity around 670–760 m/s (2,200–2,500 ft/s).

A significant portion of the combustion products from gunpowder are solids that are hygroscopic, i.e. they attract moisture from the air and make cleaning mandatory after every use, in order to prevent water accumulation in the barrel that can lead to corrosion and premature failure. These solids are also behind gunpowder's tendency to produce severe fouling that causes breech-loading actions to jam and can make reloading difficult.

=== Nitroglycerine and guncotton ===
Nitroglycerine was synthesized by the Italian chemist Ascanio Sobrero in 1847. It was subsequently developed and manufactured by Alfred Nobel as an industrial explosive under the trademark "Dynamite", but even then it was unsuitable as a propellant: despite its energetic and smokeless qualities, it detonates at supersonic speed, as opposed to deflagrating smoothly at subsonic speeds, making it more liable to shatter a gun barrel rather than propel a projectile out of it. Nitroglycerine is also highly shock-sensitive, making it unfit to be carried in battlefield conditions.

A major step forward was the invention of guncotton, a nitrocellulose-based material, by German chemist Christian Friedrich Schönbein in 1846. He promoted its use as a blasting explosive and sold manufacturing rights to the Austrian Empire. Guncotton was more powerful than gunpowder, but also was somewhat more unstable. John Taylor obtained an English patent for guncotton; and John Hall & Sons began manufacture in Faversham.

English interest languished after an explosion destroyed the Faversham factory in 1847. Austrian Baron Wilhelm Lenk von Wolfsberg built two guncotton plants producing artillery propellent, but it too was dangerous under field conditions, and guns that could fire thousands of rounds using black powder would reach the end of their service life after only a few hundred shots with the more powerful guncotton. Small arms could not withstand the pressures generated by guncotton.

After one of the Austrian factories blew up in 1862, Thomas Prentice & Company began manufacturing guncotton in Stowmarket in 1863; and British War Office chemist Sir Frederick Abel began thorough research at Waltham Abbey Royal Gunpowder Mills leading to a manufacturing process that eliminated the impurities in nitrocellulose making it a more stable product that was both safer to produce and safer to handle. Abel patented this process in 1865 when the second Austrian guncotton factory exploded. After the Stowmarket factory exploded in 1871, Waltham Abbey began production of guncotton for torpedo and mine warheads.

=== Improvements ===
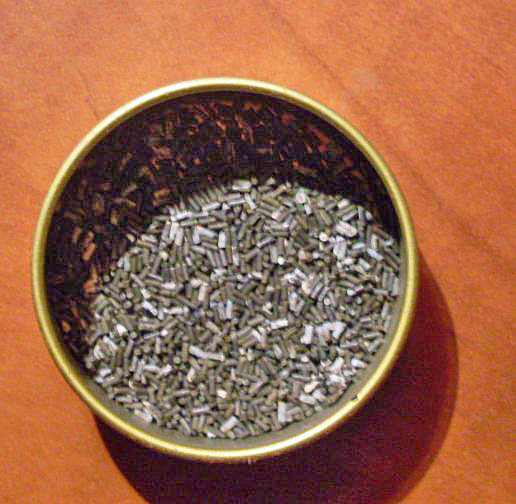
An extruded stick powder

In 1863, Prussian artillery captain Johann F. E. Schultze patented a small-arms propellant of nitrated hardwood impregnated with saltpeter or barium nitrate. Prentice received an 1866 patent for a sporting powder of nitrated paper manufactured at Stowmarket, but ballistic uniformity suffered as the paper absorbed atmospheric moisture. In 1871, Frederick Volkmann received an Austrian patent for a colloided version of Schultze powder called Collodin, which he manufactured near Vienna for use in sporting firearms. Austrian patents were not published at the time, and the Austrian Empire considered the operation a violation of the government monopoly on explosives manufacture and closed the Volkmann factory in 1875.

In 1882, the Explosives Company at Stowmarket patented an improved formulation of nitrated cotton gelatinised by ether-alcohol with potassium and/or barium nitrates. These propellants were not suitable for rifles, because rifling results in resistance to a smooth expansion of the gas, but worked well in shotguns which have no rifling.

In 1884, Paul Vieille invented a smokeless powder called Poudre B (short for poudre blanche, white powder, as distinguished from black powder) made from 68.2% insoluble nitrocellulose, 29.8% soluble nitrocellulose gelatinized with ether and 2% paraffin. This was adopted for the Lebel rifle chambered in 8×50mmR Lebel. It was passed through rollers to form paper-thin sheets, which were cut into flakes of the desired size. The resulting propellant, known as pyrocellulose, contains somewhat less nitrogen than guncotton does, and is less volatile. A particularly good feature of the propellant is that it will not detonate unless it is compressed, making it very safe to handle under normal conditions. Vieille's powder revolutionized the effectiveness of small guns because it gave off almost no smoke and was three times more powerful than black powder.

Higher muzzle velocity meant a flatter trajectory and less wind drift and bullet drop, making 1,000 m (1,094 yd) shots practicable. Since less powder was needed to propel a bullet, the cartridge could be made smaller and lighter. This allowed troops to carry more ammunition for the same weight. Also, it would burn even when wet. Black powder ammunition had to be kept dry and was almost always stored and transported in watertight cartridges. Other European countries swiftly followed and started using their own versions of Poudre B, the first being Germany and Austria, which introduced new weapons in 1888. Subsequently, Poudre B was modified several times with various compounds being added and removed. Krupp began adding diphenylamine as a stabilizer in 1888.

Meanwhile, in 1887, Alfred Nobel obtained an English patent for a smokeless gunpowder he called ballistite. In this propellant, the fibrous structure of cotton (in nitrocellulose) was destroyed by a nitroglycerine solution instead of a solvent. In England in 1889, a similar powder was patented by Hiram Maxim, and in the United States in 1890 by Hudson Maxim. Ballistite was patented in the United States in 1891. The Germans adopted ballistite for naval use in 1898, calling it WPC/98. The Italians adopted it as filite, in cord instead of flake form—but, realising its drawbacks, changed to a formulation with nitroglycerine that they called solenite. In 1891 the Russians tasked the chemist Mendeleev with finding a suitable propellant. He created nitrocellulose gelatinised by ether-alcohol, which produced more nitrogen and more uniform colloidal structure than the French use of nitro-cottons (smokeless powder) in Poudre B. He called it pyrocollodion.

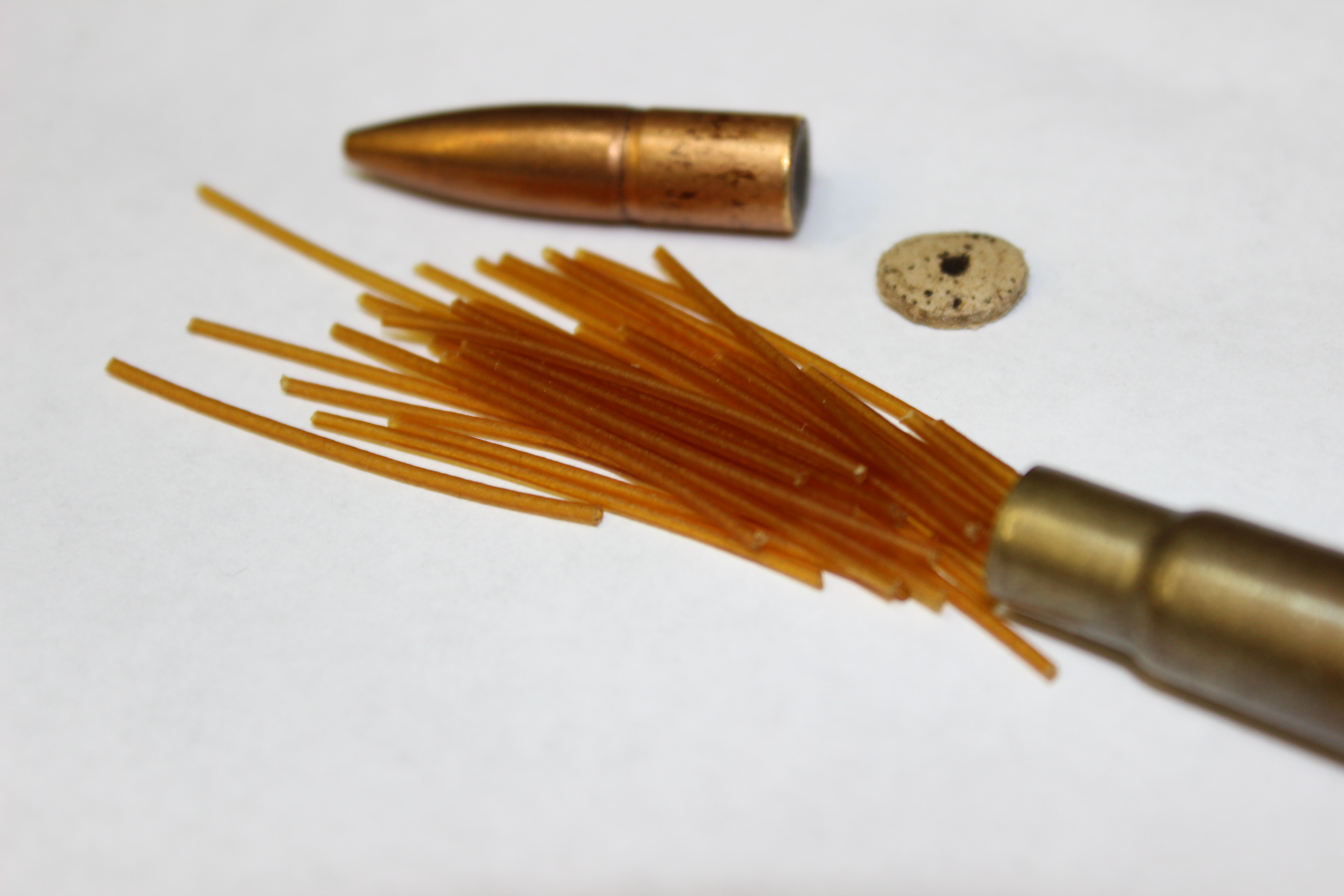
Close-up of Cordite filaments in a .303 British rifle cartridge (manufactured in 1964)

Britain conducted trials on all the various types of propellant brought to its attention, but was dissatisfied with them all and sought something superior to all existing types. In 1889, Sir Frederick Abel, James Dewar and Dr W Kellner patented (Nos 5614 and 11,664 in the names of Abel and Dewar) a new formulation that was manufactured at the Royal Gunpowder Factory at Waltham Abbey. It entered British service in 1891 as Cordite Mark 1. Its main composition was 58% nitroglycerine, 37% guncotton and 3% petroleum jelly.

A modified version, Cordite MD, entered service in 1901, with the guncotton percentage increased to 65% and nitroglycerine reduced to 30%. This change reduced the combustion temperature and hence erosion and barrel wear. Cordite's advantages over gunpowder were reduced maximum pressure in the chamber (hence lighter breeches, etc.) but longer high pressure. Cordite could be made in any desired shape or size. The creation of cordite led to a lengthy court battle between Nobel, Maxim, and another inventor over alleged British patent infringement.

The Anglo-American Explosives Company began manufacturing its shotgun powder in Oakland, New Jersey, in 1890. DuPont began producing guncotton at Carneys Point Township, New Jersey, in 1891. Charles E. Munroe of the Naval Torpedo Station in Newport, Rhode Island, patented a formulation of guncotton colloided with nitrobenzene, called Indurite, in 1891. Several United States firms began producing smokeless powder when Winchester Repeating Arms Company started loading sporting cartridges with Explosives Company powder in 1893. California Powder Works began producing a mixture of nitroglycerine and nitrocellulose with ammonium picrate as Peyton Powder, Leonard Smokeless Powder Company began producing nitroglycerine–nitrocellulose Ruby powders, Laflin & Rand negotiated a license to produce Ballistite, and DuPont started producing smokeless shotgun powder.

The United States Army evaluated 25 varieties of smokeless powder and selected Ruby and Peyton Powders as the most suitable for use in the Krag–Jørgensen service rifle. Ruby was preferred, because tin-plating was required to protect brass cartridge cases from picric acid in the Peyton Powder. Rather than paying the required royalties for Ballistite, Laflin & Rand financed Leonard's reorganization as the American Smokeless Powder Company. United States Army Lieutenant Whistler assisted American Smokeless Powder Company factory superintendent Aspinwall in formulating an improved powder named W.A. for their efforts. W.A. smokeless powder was the standard for United States military service rifles from 1897 until 1908.

In 1897, United States Navy Lieutenant John Bernadou patented a nitrocellulose powder colloided with ether-alcohol. The Navy licensed or sold patents for this formulation to DuPont and the California Powder Works while retaining manufacturing rights for the Naval Powder Factory, Indian Head, Maryland constructed in 1900. The United States Army adopted the Navy single-base formulation in 1908 and began manufacture at Picatinny Arsenal. By that time Laflin & Rand had taken over the American Powder Company to protect their investment, and Laflin & Rand had been purchased by DuPont in 1902.

Upon securing a 99-year lease of the Explosives Company in 1903, DuPont enjoyed use of all significant smokeless powder patents in the United States, and was able to optimize production of smokeless powder. When government anti-trust action forced divestiture in 1912, DuPont retained the nitrocellulose smokeless powder formulations used by the United States military and released the double-base formulations used in sporting ammunition to the reorganized Hercules Powder Company. These newer and more powerful propellants were more stable and thus safer to handle than Poudre B.

== Characteristics ==
Hodgdon H110 smokeless pistol powder

The properties of the propellant are greatly influenced by the size and shape of its pieces. The specific surface area of the propellant influences the speed of burning, and the size and shape of the particles determine the specific surface area. By manipulation of the shape it is possible to influence the burning rate and hence the rate at which pressure builds during combustion. Smokeless powder burns only on the surfaces of the pieces. Larger pieces burn more slowly, and the burn rate is further controlled by flame-deterrent coatings that retard burning slightly. The intent is to regulate the burn rate so that a more or less constant pressure is exerted on the propelled projectile as long as it is in the barrel so as to obtain the highest velocity. Large pieces may be perforated with small diameter holes to stabilize the burn rate because as the outside burns inward (thus shrinking the burning surface area) perforation surfaces are burning outward (thus increasing the burning surface area, but faster, so as to fill up the increasing volume of barrel presented by the departing projectile). Fast-burning pistol powders are made by producing flatter pieces to increase surface area - flakes may be directly extruded, or spherical granules may be flattened. Drying is usually performed under a vacuum. The solvents are condensed and recycled. The granules are also coated with graphite to prevent static electricity sparks from causing undesired ignition.

Smokeless powder does not leave the thick, heavy fouling of hygroscopic material associated with black powder that causes rusting of the barrel (though some primer compounds can leave hygroscopic salts that have a similar effect; non-corrosive primer compounds were introduced in the 1920s).)

Faster-burning propellants generate higher temperatures and higher pressures, however they also increase wear on gun barrels.

Nitrocellulose deteriorates with time, yielding acidic byproducts. Those byproducts catalyze the further deterioration, increasing its rate. The released heat, in case of bulk storage of the powder, or too large blocks of solid propellant, can cause self-ignition of the material. Single-base nitrocellulose propellants are hygroscopic and most susceptible to degradation; double-base and triple-base propellants tend to deteriorate more slowly. To neutralize the decomposition products, which could otherwise cause corrosion of metals of the cartridges and gun barrels, calcium carbonate is added to some formulations.

To prevent buildup of the deterioration products, stabilizers are added. Diphenylamine is one of the most common stabilizers used. Nitrated analogs of diphenylamine formed in the process of stabilizing decomposing powder are sometimes used as stabilizers themselves. The stabilizers are added in the amount of 0.5–2% of the total amount of the formulation; higher amounts tend to degrade its ballistic properties. The amount of the stabilizer is depleted with time with substantial changes of ballistic properties. Propellants in storage should be periodically tested for the amount of stabilizer remaining, as its depletion may lead to auto-ignition of the propellant. Moisture changes the stabilizers consumption over time.

== Composition ==
Propellants using nitrocellulose (detonation velocity 7,300 m/s (23,950 ft/s), RE factor 1.10) (typically an ether-alcohol colloid of nitrocellulose) as the sole explosive propellant ingredient are described as single-base powder.

Propellants mixtures containing nitrocellulose and nitroglycerin (detonation velocity 7,700 m/s (25,260 ft/s), RE factor 1.54) as explosive propellant ingredients are known as double-base powder. Alternatively, diethylene glycol dinitrate (detonation velocity 6,610 m/s (21,690 ft/s), RE factor 1.17) can be used as a nitroglycerin replacement when reduced flame temperatures without sacrificing chamber pressure are of importance. Reduction of flame temperature significantly reduces barrel erosion and hence wear.

During the 1930s, triple-base propellants containing nitrocellulose, nitroglycerin or diethylene glycol dinitrate, and a substantial quantity of nitroguanidine (detonation velocity 8,200 m/s (26,900 ft/s), RE factor 0.95) as explosive propellant ingredients were commercialized. The first triple-base propellant, featuring 20-25% of nitroguanidine and 30-45% nitroglycerine, was developed at the Dynamit Nobel factory at Avigliana by its director Dr. Modesto Abelli (1859-1911) and patented in 1905. These "cold propellant" mixtures have reduced flash and flame temperature without sacrificing chamber pressure compared to single- and double-base propellants, albeit at the cost of more smoke. In practice, triple-base propellants are, due to their higher price, reserved mainly for high-velocity large caliber ammunition such as used in (naval) artillery and tank guns, which suffer from bore erosion the most. During WWII they had some use by British and German artillery, and after the war they became the standard propellants in all British large-caliber ammunition designs except small arms. Most Western nations, except the United States, followed a similar path.

In the late 20th century new propellant formulations started to appear. These are based on nitroguanidine and high explosives of the RDX type (detonation velocity 8,750 m/s (28,710 ft/s), RE factor 1.60).

Detonation velocities are of limited value in assessing the reaction rates of nitrocellulose propellants formulated to avoid detonation. Although the slower reaction is often described as burning because of similar gaseous end products at elevated temperatures, the decomposition differs from combustion in an oxygen atmosphere. Conversion of nitrocellulose propellants to high-pressure gas proceeds from the exposed surface to the interior of each solid particle in accordance with Piobert's law. Studies of solid single- and double-base propellant reactions suggest reaction rate is controlled by heat transfer through the temperature gradient across a series of zones or phases as the reaction proceeds from the surface into the solid. The deepest portion of the solid experiencing heat transfer melts and begins phase transition from solid to gas in a foam zone. The gaseous propellant decomposes into simpler molecules in a surrounding fizz zone. Energy is released in a luminous outer flame zone where the simpler gas molecules react to form conventional combustion products like steam and carbon monoxide. The foam zone acts as an insulator slowing the rate of heat transfer from the flame zone into the unreacted solid. Reaction rates vary with pressure; because the foam allows less effective heat transfer at low pressure, with greater heat transfer as higher pressures compress the gas volume of that foam. Propellants designed for a minimum heat transfer pressure may fail to sustain the flame zone at lower pressures.

The energetic components used in smokeless propellants include nitrocellulose (the most common), nitroglycerin, nitroguanidine, DINA (bis-nitroxyethylnitramine; diethanolamine dinitrate, DEADN; DHE), Fivonite (2,2,5,5-tetramethylol-cyclopentanone tetranitrate, CyP), DGN (diethylene glycol dinitrate), and acetyl cellulose.

Deterrents (or moderants) are used to slow the burning rate. Deterrents include centralites (symmetrical diphenyl urea—primarily diethyl or dimethyl), dibutyl phthalate, dinitrotoluene (toxic and carcinogenic), akardite (asymmetrical diphenyl urea), ortho-Tolyl urethane, and polyester adipate. Camphor was formerly used but is now obsolete.

Stabilizers prevent or slow down self-decomposition. These include diphenylamine, petroleum jelly, calcium carbonate, magnesium oxide, sodium bicarbonate, and beta-Naphthol methyl ether. Obsolete stabilizers include amyl alcohol and aniline.

Decoppering additives hinder the buildup of copper residues from the gun barrel rifling. These include tin and compounds of it (e.g. tin dioxide), as well as bismuth and compounds of it (e.g. bismuth trioxide, bismuth subcarbonate, bismuth nitrate, and bismuth antimonide); the bismuth compounds are favored as copper dissolves in molten bismuth, forming a brittle and easily removable alloy. Lead foil and lead compounds have been phased out due to toxicity.

Wear reduction materials including wax, talc, and titanium dioxide are added to lower the wear of the gun barrel liners. Large guns use polyurethane jackets over the powder bags.

Other additives include ethyl acetate (a solvent for manufacture of spherical powder), rosin (a surfactant to hold the grain shape of spherical powder), and graphite (a lubricant to cover the grains and prevent them from sticking together, and to dissipate static electricity).

=== Flash reduction ===
Flash reducers dim muzzle flash, the light emitted in the vicinity of the muzzle by the hot propellant gases and the chemical reactions that follow as the gases mix with the surrounding air. Before projectiles exit, a slight pre-flash may occur from gases leaking past the projectiles. Following muzzle exit, the heat of gases is usually sufficient to emit visible radiation: the primary flash. The gases expand but as they pass through the Mach disc, they are re-compressed to produce an intermediate flash. Hot, combustible gases (e.g. hydrogen and carbon-monoxide) may follow when they mix with oxygen in the surrounding air to produce the secondary flash, the brightest. The secondary flash does not usually occur with small arms.

Nitrocellulose contains insufficient oxygen to completely oxidize its carbon and hydrogen. The oxygen deficit is increased by addition of graphite and organic stabilizers. Products of combustion within the gun barrel include flammable gasses like hydrogen and carbon monoxide. At high temperature, these flammable gasses will ignite when turbulently mixed with atmospheric oxygen beyond the muzzle of the gun. During night engagements, the flash produced by ignition can reveal the location of the gun to enemy forces and cause temporary night-blindness among the gun crew by photo-bleaching visual purple.

Flash suppressors are commonly used on small arms to reduce the flash signature, but this approach is not practical for artillery. Artillery muzzle flash up to 150 feet (46 m) from the muzzle has been observed, and can be reflected off clouds and be visible for distances up to 30 miles (48 km). For artillery, the most effective method is a propellant that produces a large proportion of inert nitrogen at relatively low temperatures that dilutes the combustible gases. Triple-base propellants are used for this because of the nitrogen in the nitroguanidine.

Flash reducers include potassium chloride, potassium nitrate, potassium sulfate, and potassium bitartrate (potassium hydrogen tartrate: a byproduct of wine production formerly used by French artillery). Before the use of triple-base propellants, the usual method of flash reduction was to add inorganic salts like potassium chloride so their specific heat capacity might reduce the temperature of combustion gasses and their finely divided particulate smoke might block visible wavelengths of radiant energy of combustion.

All flash reducers have a disadvantage: the production of smoke.

== Manufacturing ==
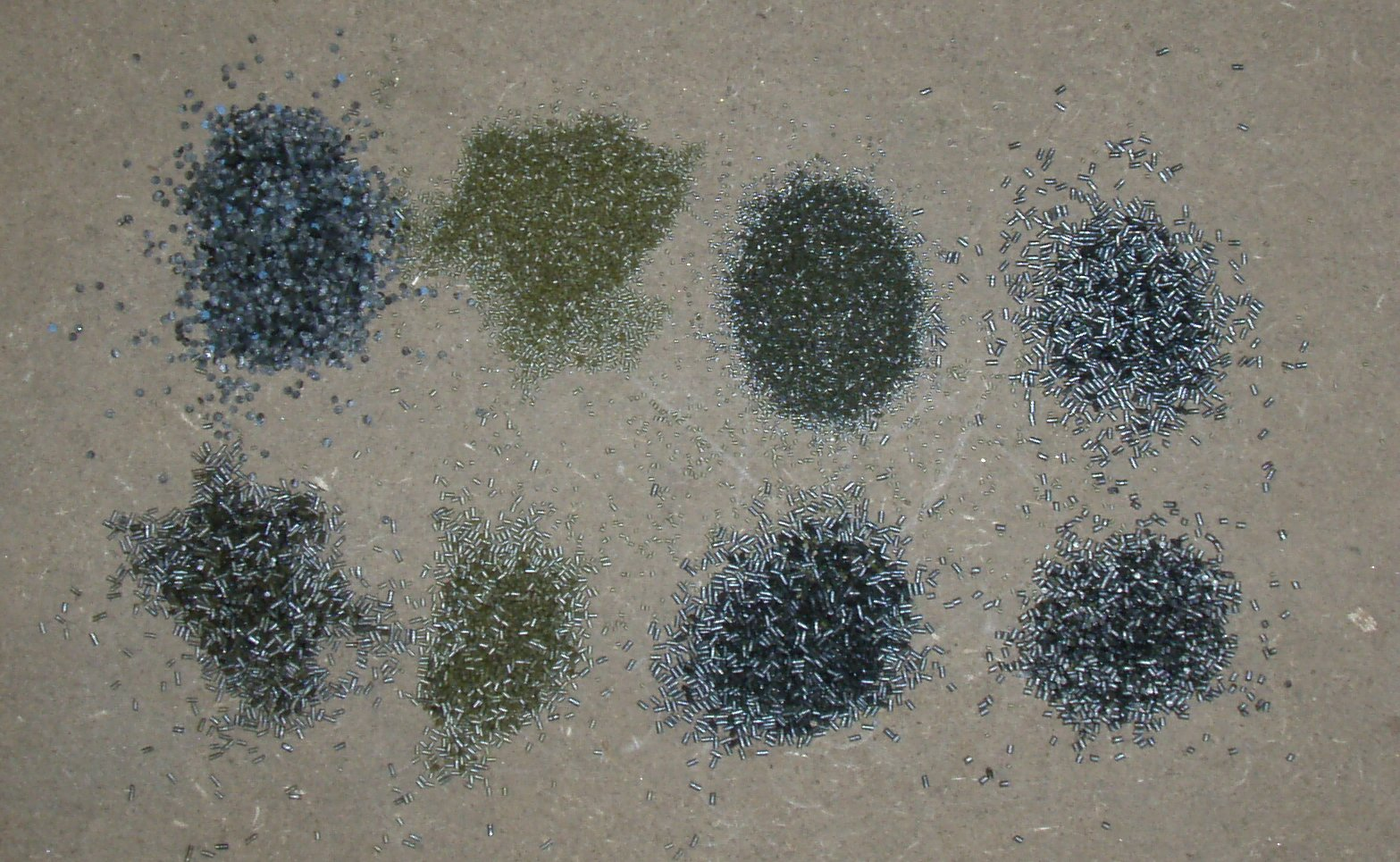
Ammunition handloading powders

Smokeless powder may be corned into small spherical balls or extruded into cylinders or strips with many cross-sectional shapes (strips with various rectangular proportions, single or multi-hole cylinders, slotted cylinders) using solvents such as ether. These extrusions can be cut into short ("flakes") or long pieces ("cords" many inches long). Cannon powder has the largest pieces.

The United States Navy manufactured single-base tubular powder for naval artillery at Indian Head, Maryland, beginning in 1900. Similar procedures were used for United States Army production at Picatinny Arsenal beginning in 1907 and for manufacture of smaller grained Improved Military Rifle (IMR) powders after 1914. Short-fiber cotton linter was boiled in a solution of sodium hydroxide to remove vegetable waxes, and then dried before conversion to nitrocellulose by mixing with concentrated nitric and sulfuric acids. Nitrocellulose still resembles fibrous cotton at this point in the manufacturing process, and was typically identified as pyrocellulose because it would spontaneously ignite in air until unreacted acid was removed. The term guncotton was also used; although some references identify guncotton as a more extensively nitrated and refined product used in torpedo and mine warheads prior to use of TNT.

Unreacted acid was removed from pyrocellulose pulp by a multistage draining and water washing process similar to that used in paper mills during production of chemical woodpulp. Pressurized alcohol removed remaining water from drained pyrocellulose prior to mixing with ether and diphenylamine. The mixture was then fed through a press extruding a long tubular cord form to be cut into grains of the desired length.

Alcohol and ether were then evaporated from "green" powder grains to a remaining solvent concentration between 3 percent for rifle powders and 7 percent for large artillery powder grains. Burning rate is inversely proportional to solvent concentration. Grains were coated with electrically conductive graphite to minimize generation of static electricity during subsequent blending. "Lots" containing more than ten tonnes of powder grains were mixed through a tower arrangement of blending hoppers to minimize ballistic differences. Each blended lot was then subjected to testing to determine the correct loading charge for the desired performance.

Military quantities of old smokeless powder were sometimes reworked into new lots of propellants. Through the 1920s Fred Olsen worked at Picatinny Arsenal experimenting with ways to salvage tons of single-base cannon powder manufactured for World War I. Olsen was employed by Western Cartridge Company in 1929 and developed a process for manufacturing spherical smokeless powder by 1933. Reworked powder or washed pyrocellulose can be dissolved in ethyl acetate containing small quantities of desired stabilizers and other additives. The resultant syrup, combined with water and surfactants, can be heated and agitated in a pressurized container until the syrup forms an emulsion of small spherical globules of the desired size. Ethyl acetate distills off as pressure is slowly reduced to leave small spheres of nitrocellulose and additives. The spheres can be subsequently modified by adding nitroglycerine to increase energy, flattening between rollers to a uniform minimum dimension, coating with phthalate deterrents to slow ignition, and/or glazing with graphite to improve flow characteristics during blending.

In the United States modern smokeless powder is produced by St. Marks Powder, Inc. owned by General Dynamics.

== See also ==
- Shimose powder
- Antique firearms
- Brown-brown

== Bibliography ==
- Campbell, John (1985). Naval Weapons of World War Two. Naval Institute Press. ISBN 0-87021-459-4.
- Davis, Tenney L. (1943). The Chemistry of Powder & Explosives (Angriff Press [1992] ed.). John Wiley & Sons Inc. ISBN 0-913022-00-4.
- Dallman, John (2006). "Question 27/05: "Flashless" Propellant". Warship International. XLIII (3): 246. ISSN 0043-0374.
- Davis, William C. Jr. (1981). Handloading. National Rifle Association of America. ISBN 0-935998-34-9.
- Fairfield, A. P., CDR USN (1921). Naval Ordnance. Lord Baltimore Press.
- Gibbs, Jay (2010). "Question 27/05: "Flashless" Propellant". Warship International. XLVII (3): 217. ISSN 0043-0374.
- Grobmeier, A.H. (2006). "Question 27/05: "Flashless" Propellant". Warship International. XLIII (3): 245. ISSN 0043-0374.
- Grulich, Fred (2006). "Question 27/05: "Flashless" Propellant". Warship International. XLIII (3): 245–246. ISSN 0043-0374.
- Hatcher, Julian S. & Barr, Al (1951). Handloading. Hennage Lithograph Company.
- Matunas, E.A. (1978). Winchester-Western Ball Powder Loading Data. Olin Corporation.
- Wolfe, Dave (1982). Propellant Profiles Volume 1. Wolfe Publishing Company. ISBN 0-935632-10-7.
