= Improved military rifle powder =

Propellants

Improved military rifle propellants are tubular nitrocellulose propellants evolved from World War I through World War II for loading military and commercial ammunition and sold to civilians for reloading rifle ammunition for hunting and target shooting. These propellants were DuPont modifications of United States artillery propellants. DuPont miniaturized the large artillery grains to form military rifle propellants suitable for use in small arms. These were improved during the First World War to be more efficient in rimless military cartridges replacing earlier rimmed rifle cartridges. Four-digit numbers identified experimental propellants, and a few successful varieties warranted extensive production by several manufacturers. Some were used almost exclusively for military contracts, or commercial ammunition production, but a few have been distributed for civilian use in handloading. Improved military rifle propellants are coated with dinitrotoluene (DNT) to slow initial burning and graphite to minimize static electricity during blending and loading. They contain 0.6% diphenylamine as a stabilizer and 1% potassium sulfate to reduce muzzle flash.

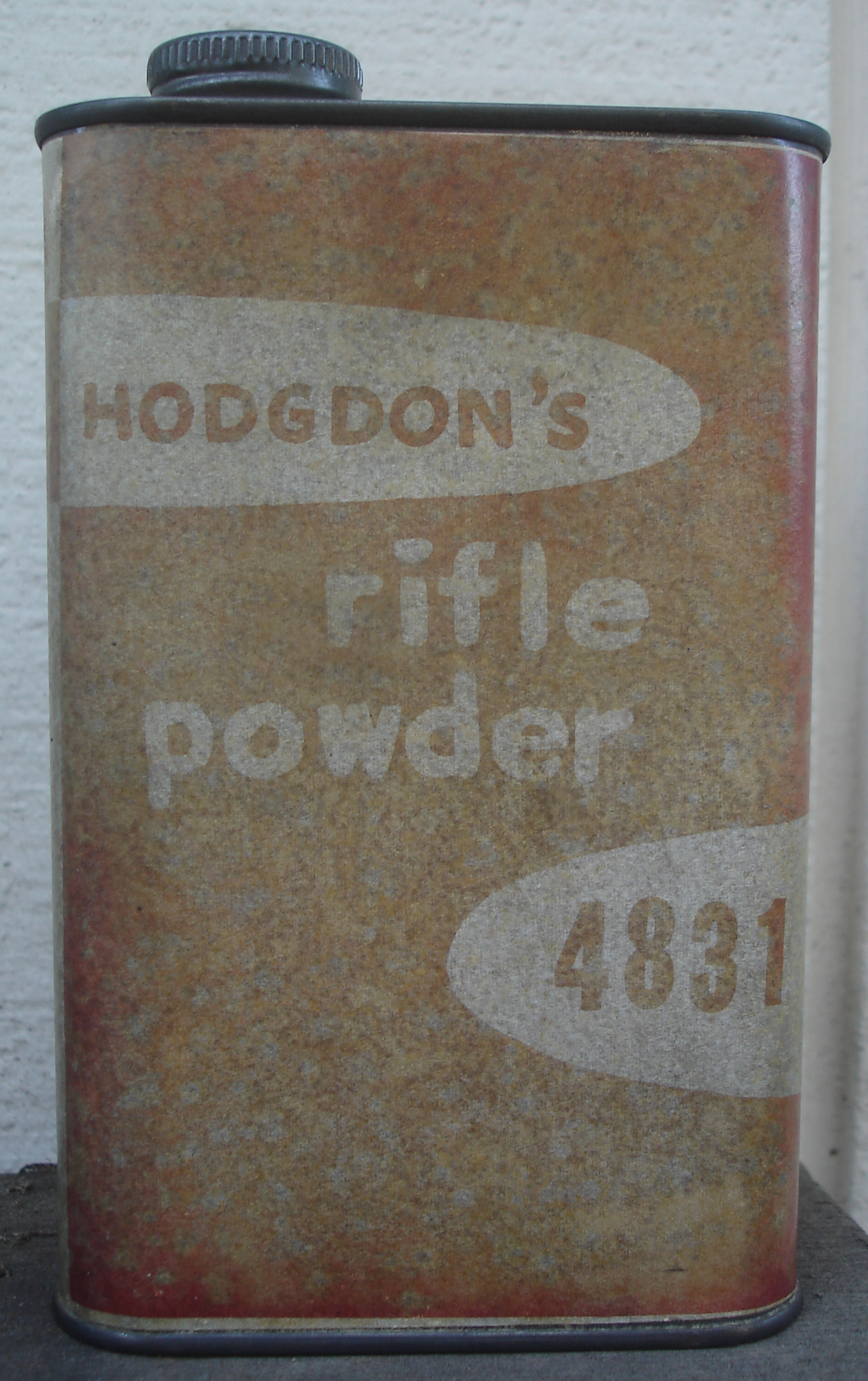
Specification 4831 packaged for retail distribution circa 1960

== Reaction mechanism ==
John Bernadou patented a single-base propellant while working at the Naval Torpedo Station in 1897. Bernadou's colloid of nitrocellulose with ether and alcohol was formulated for the reaction pressures generated within naval artillery. The colloid was extruded in dense cylinders with longitudinal perforations to decompose in accordance with Piobert's law. If all external surfaces of the grain are ignited simultaneously, the grain reacts inward from the outside of the cylinder (creating a reaction area of decreasing size), and outward from each perforation (creating a reaction area of increasing size.) Propellant decomposition is initiated by heat causing the colloid to melt and form bubbles of reactive gas which decompose in a luminous exothermic reaction after the bubbles burst. Rate of reaction is controlled by heat transfer through the temperature gradient from the luminous reacting gas through the bubbles to the intact colloid. Heat transfer (and rate of reaction) is faster if the bubbles are under pressure, because heat transfer is more efficient through smaller bubbles. These propellants may not react satisfactorily at low pressures within the oxygen-deficient atmosphere of a gun barrel.

== Adaptation for use in military rifles ==
The United States Navy licensed use of the patent to DuPont for production of artillery propellant for ships operating in the Atlantic, and to California Powder Works for ships operating in the Pacific. The United States Army also used Bernadou's propellant for artillery and for the new M1903 Springfield service rifle in 1909 with the 150-grain (9.7 g) M1906 bullet. Grain size varied with bore diameter. While artillery grain dimensions might be several inches or centimeters, the standard grains of military rifle propellant were 0.085 inches (2.2 mm) long and 0.03 inches (0.76 mm) in diameter. The Army identified this military rifle propellant as Pyro DG (for diphenylamine, graphited), and 500 tons per day were manufactured by various plants through the first world war.

== Package labeling ==
Military rifle propellant was manufactured in batches in a procedure taking about two weeks from treating cotton linters with nitric acid, through curing the extruded grains to evaporate excess ether and alcohol, and finally coating the dried grains with DNT and graphite. Each batch had somewhat different reaction rates, so testing was required to determine the appropriate charge to generate required reaction pressure in the intended cartridge. Test results were forwarded to the factory or arsenal assembling cartridges. Propellants packaged in small sheet metal canisters for sale to civilians were labeled Military Rifle Powder to distinguish the product from low-density "bulk" propellants intended to react at lower pressures in shotguns or pistols and from Sporting Rifle Powder for early lever-action rifles unable to withstand the pressures of 20th-century service rifle cartridges. Charges of low-density "bulk" propellants were often similar to the volumes of gunpowder used in older firearms and reaction rates were less variable at low pressures appropriate for those cartridges; but each batch of military rifle propellant required a different canister label specifying the batch or lot number with the tested charge weight to generate appropriate reaction pressure in intended cartridges.

== Improvements ==
Orders from countries fighting World War I required determining charges for different European military rifle cartridges, and production volume supported research for improvements. Improved military rifle propellants included a longitudinal perforation converting each grain to a tube with a progressive burning interior surface allowing a more consistent gas generation rate through the reaction period. Early propellants were identified by a two-digit number. As the number of experimental variations increased, each improved military rifle propellant was identified by a four-digit number. In addition to the canisters available from DuPont, the Director of Civilian Marksmanship (DCM) sold surplus improved military rifle propellants to members of the National Rifle Association of America. By 1936 improved DuPont process control produced batches conforming to published reloading data rather than requiring different charge specifications for each batch; and those propellants have remained in production. Non-conforming batches were used to load commercial and military cartridges following traditional testing procedures.

== World War II ==
Wartime temporarily interrupted production of civilian specification propellants, as major quantities of new specifications were manufactured. Number 4831 was used to load navy anti-aircraft machine gun ammunition, and number 4895 was used to load United States service rifle ammunition. As these propellants became military surplus after the war, large quantities of different batches were blended together to make products with uniform average performance for sale to civilians. Manufacture of these specifications for civilian use resumed after military surplus had been exhausted; but reaction characteristics were slightly different from the products distributed from military surplus supplies.

== Specification numbers ==
Number	Date Released	Date Discontinued	Grain Size	Notes
15	1914	~1917	standard	designed for .276 Enfield; replaced by 1015
16	1916	~1927	standard	identified as NCZ when used for loading British machine gun ammunition; production for civilian sales continued after World War I
17	1915	1925	standard	used to load various European service rifle cartridges and distributed as military surplus after World War I
17 1/2	1923	1933	standard	added tin to specification 16 to reduce fouling from cupronickel-jacketed bullets; replaced by 3031
18	1915	1930	short	
1015	1919	1934	standard	labeled 15 1/2; added tin to specification 15 to reduce fouling from cupronickel-jacketed bullets; replaced by 4064
1147	1923	1935	short	for military cartridges like the .30-06 Springfield and the 7.92×57mm Mauser; replaced by 4320
1185	1926	1938	standard	used to load the 173-grain (11.2 g) .30-06 Springfield M1 bullet; sold as military surplus by DCM
1204	1925	1935	thin & short	replaced by 4227
3031	1934		standard	replaced 17 1/2; for mid-range loads and medium sporting and military cartridges like the .257 Roberts, .30-30 and .348 Winchester
4064	1935		standard	replaced 1015; for magnum capacity cartridges like the .250-3000 Savage, .35 Whelen and .375 H&H Magnum
4198	1935		thin	intended for short range loads and medium capacity cartridges like the .300 Savage, .32 Remington, and .32 Winchester Special
4227	1935		thin & short	replaced 1204; for small capacity cartridges like the .22 Hornet, .25-20, and .32-20
4320	1935		short	replaced 1147 for large capacity sporting and military cartridges like the .220 Swift, .270 Winchester and .30-06
4350	1940		standard	
4475	1936			used to load military 7.62×51mm NATO and 5.56×45mm NATO cartridges during the Cold War
4814				used to load .50 machine gun cartridges
4831	1973		standard	used to load Oerlikon 20 mm cannon cartridges through World War II; salvaged propellant became available to civilians about 1949; contains 1.1% diphenylamine (0.5% more than other improved military rifle propellants.)
4895	1962		shortened	used to load the 152-grain (9.8 g) .30-06 Springfield M2 bullet through World War II; sold as military surplus after World War II.

IMR® is a registered trademark of the IMR Powder Company assigned to the Hodgdon Powder Company, which markets powders under that name.

== See also ==
- Hodgdon Powder Company
- Smokeless powder
- Handloading

== Sources ==
- Davis, Tenney L. (1943). The Chemistry of Powder & Explosives (Angriff Press [1992] ed.). John Wiley & Sons Inc. ISBN 0-913022-00-4.
- Fairfield, A. P., CDR USN (1921). Naval Ordnance. Lord Baltimore Press.
- Sharpe, Philip B. (1953). Complete Guide to Handloading (Third ed.). New York: Funk & Wagnalls.
