= Hodgdon Powder Company =

American firearm propellant company

- Industry: Arms
- Founded: 1966
- Headquarters: Shawnee, Kansas, U.S.
- Key people: Bruce E. Hodgdon, founder; J.B. Hodgdon; Bob Hodgdon
- Products: Smokeless powders
- Website: hodgdonpowderco.com

The Hodgdon Powder Company began in 1952 as B.E. Hodgdon, Inc., and has become a major distributor of smokeless powder for the ammunition industry, as well as for individuals who load their own ammunition by hand. The company's corporate office and manufacturing facilities are located in Kansas, United States. Hodgdon acquired IMR Powder Company in 2003. Winchester branded reloading powders have been distributed in the United States by Hodgdon since March 2006.

== Background ==
In the opening days of World War II, a chemist friend of Bruce E. Hodgdon was casually reminiscing about World War I. He mentioned the quantities of surplus smokeless powder the military had dumped at sea after the war; and speculated how useful that would have been to handloaders struggling through the Great Depression. He anticipated a similar surplus powder situation might occur after World War II. Hodgdon began investigating availability of surplus powder when the war ended; and sales to handloaders began in 1946. One of the first powders he found was 4895 used for loading .30-06 Springfield service ammunition. He purchased 25 tons of government surplus 4895 for $2000 and then purchased two boxcars to store it in preparation for resale at 75 cents per pound. His family initially packaged the powder for resale in the basement of their home. In 1947, he began acquisition of 80 tons of spherical powder salvaged from disassembled .303 British military rifle cartridges manufactured in the United States. By 1949, he was marketing the powder as BL type C. The C was to indicate the powder burned "cooler" than traditional Improved Military Rifle (IMR) powders. In 1949, he began acquisition of powder salvaged from disassembled Oerlikon 20mm cannon cartridges. This powder resembled IMR 4350 in appearance, and with a slower burning rate, was initially marketed as "4350 Data", and later as 4831.

United States powder manufacturers had discontinued production of sporting ammunition during World War II; and after the war attempted to exercise greater product safety control by emphasizing sales of loaded ammunition rather than resuming production of handloading components. A common approach to product safety involved offering ammunition safe for use in the oldest or weakest firearm chambered for that cartridge. Owners of stronger firearms found and experimented with Hodgdon's previously unknown powders to achieve ballistics superior to available factory ammunition for older cartridges like the 7.92×57mm Mauser. Long-range shooters found 4831 was superior to previously available powders for high-capacity bottle-necked cases.

== History ==
United States powder manufacturers resumed powder sales of one-pound (454 gram) canisters after observing Hodgdon's successful sales to handloaders. DuPont resumed retail distribution of their pre-war nitrocellulose Improved Military Rifle (IMR) series; and Hercules Powder Company resumed production of six of their pre-war double-base powders. Hodgdon Powder Company began using an H-prefix to differentiate powders distributed by Hodgdon from competitors. Surplus Vulcan cannon spherical powder was distributed as H870 beginning in 1959.

All of the surplus BL type C had been sold by 1961. Olin Corporation had manufactured the powder as 846, and continued production for loading 7.62×51mm NATO cartridges. Hodgdon began marketing post-war production as spherical BL-C lot no. 2, or BL-C(2). Olin began retail distribution of Winchester-Western ball powders for pistol and shotgun loading in 1960; and Winchester-Western rifle ball powders followed in 1968. Hodgdon distributed spherical powders HS-5 and HS-6 for shotguns and H110, H335, H380, H414, and H450 for rifles.

DuPont added IMR 4895 to their retail distribution line in 1962, and added IMR 4831 in 1973 when supplies of surplus H4831 were exhausted. Hodgdon then acquired newly manufactured H4831 from Nobel Enterprises in Scotland. The Nobel formulations offer similar ballistic performance, but substitute centralite deterrent coatings for dinitrotoluene used in United States formulations. Handloaders were advised H-prefix powders were not the same as IMR-prefix powders of the same number. Hodgdon distributed H4198 and H4227 similar to IMR powders distributed by DuPont.

== Modern black powder substitutes ==
Hodgdon's product line includes Pyrodex and Triple Seven, which are modern substitutes for black powder and intended for use in muzzleloaders and certain antique firearms. Consequences of black powder's easy ignition by sparks or static electricity make manufacture and storage hazardous. The sole factory of the United States' largest 20th-century black powder manufacturer was closed by an accidental explosion as 1970 legislation established new regulations discouraging merchants from stocking black powder for sale. Future historical re-enactments with replica firearms appeared doubtful until Hodgdon introduced black powder substitute Pyrodex in 1975 with black powder combustion characteristics and smokeless powder safety.
